= List of statutes of New Zealand (1960–1972) =

This is a partial list of statutes of New Zealand for the period of the Second National Government of New Zealand up to and including part of the first year of the Third Labour Government of New Zealand.

== 1960s ==
=== 1961 ===
- Beachlands Domain Board Empowering Act
- Borough of Port Chalmers Leasing Empowering Act
- Broadcasting Corporation Act Amended: 1965/67/68/70/71
- Carter Trust Act
- Cook County Council Empowering Act
- Crimes Act Amended: 1910/15/20/22/41/50/52/54/55/63/66/69/73/77/78/79/80/82/85/86/87/88/89/91/93/94/95/97/98/2000/01/02/03/05/06
- Dairy Production and Marketing Board Act Amended: 1962/63/65
- Engineering Associates Act Amended: 1964/68/76/88/96/2007
- International Finance Agreements Act Amended: 1966/68/75/76/92/98/2007
- Lincoln College Act Amended: 1966/70/77/87
- Maori Education Foundation Act Amended: 1962/63/65/70/72/75/77/92
- Massey College Act
- Monetary and Economic Council Act
- Motor Spirits Duty Act
- National Military Service Act Amended: 1964/68/69
- Nelson Harbour Board and Nelson City Empowering Act
- Republic of Cyprus Act
- Tariff and Development Board Act Amended: 1964/65/67/69/70/71
- Thomas Adoption Discharge Act
- Universities Act Amended: 1962/66/70/71/77/78/80/88
- University of Auckland Act Amended: 1957/66/70/77/87
- University of Canterbury Act Amended: 1957/66/68/70/77/87
- Victoria University of Wellington Act Amended: 1957/66/69/70/77/78/87
- Western Samoa Act Amended: 1970
- Whakatane Board Mills Limited Water Supply Act

Plus 103 acts amended

=== 1962 ===
- Akaroa County Council Empowering Act
- Central Canterbury Electric Power Board Empowering Act
- Church of England Children's Trust Act
- Civil Defence Act Amended: 1965/67/68/71/75/79/88/89
- Commonwealth Fabric Corporation Act
- Coromandel County Council Ambulance Levy Act
- East Coast Permanent Trustees Limited Act Amended: 1972
- Electricity Advisory Council Act
- Farm Forestry Act Amended: 1964
- Gore Borough Empowering Act
- Historic Articles Act
- Innkeepers Act Amended: 1980
- Maori Welfare Act Amended: 1963
- Massey University College of Manawatu Act
- Masterton Borough Council Staff Retiring Fund Act
- Mining Tenures Registration Act Amended: 1983
- Napier Harbour Board Loan and Empowering Act
- Nature Conservation Council Act Amended: 1971
- Occupiers' Liability Act
- Public Bodies Meetings Act Amended: 1963/74/75
- Religious Instruction and Observances in Public Schools Act
- Sale of Liquor Act Amended: 1963/64/65/67/68/69/70/71/72/74/75/76/77/79/80/81/82/83/85/86/88/89/91/93/94/96/97/99/2001/02/04/05
- Shearers Act Amended: 1983
- State Services Act Amended: 1964/65/66/73/74/78/81/82/85/87
- Taumaranui District Services' Memorial Fund Act
- Te Aroha Borough Water-Supply Empowering Act
- Timaru Harbour Board and Timaru Council Empowering Act
- Whangarei Borough Council Empowering Act

Plus 110 acts amended

=== 1963 ===
- Architects Act Amended: 1979/82/88/97
- Auckland Regional Authority Act Amended: 1964/65/66/68/69/70/71/72/73/75/78/87
- Auckland Regional Planning Authority Act
- Criminal Injuries Compensation Act Amended: 1966/67/69/71
- Dental Act Amended: 1966/68/71/89/94/99
- Fishing Industry Board Act Amended: 1965/75/78/81/85/87/94 Repealed: 2001
- Hutt Valley Underground Water Authority Empowering Act
- Indecent Publications Act 1963
- Liddle Adoption Discharge Act
- Malaysia Act
- Manukau County Urban Farm Land Rating Act
- Massey University of Manawatu Act
- Matrimonial Proceedings Act Amended: 1966/68/70
- Matrimonial Property Act Amended: 1966/67/68/80/83/85/86/87/94/98
- National Research Advisory Council Act Amended: 1976/86
- North Short Drainage Act
- Queen Elizabeth the Second Arts Council of New Zealand Act Amended: 1968/77/78/83/90
- Queen Elizabeth the Second Postgraduate Fellowship of New Zealand Act
- Real Estate Agents Act Amended: 1967/68/77/78/81/82/83/87/89/92/94/2005
- Republic of Nigeria Act
- Republic of Tanganyika Act
- Rotorua Maori Arts and Crafts Institute Act
- Secondhand Dealers Act Amended: 1952/64/67/68/75
- State Insurance Act Amended: 1983/86
- Telford Farm Training Institute Act
- Tourist and Publicity Department Act Amended: 1967/89
- University of Waikato Act Amended: 1966/70/77/78/87
- Waipawa County Council Empowering Act
- Whangarei Harbour Board Vesting Empowering Act

Plus 121 acts amended

=== 1964 ===
- Burial and Cremation Act Amended: 1968/75/76/79/83/97/2000/03
- Christchurch City Reclamation and Empowering Act
- Continental Shelf Act Amended: 1996/2005
- Cook Islands Constitution Act Amended: 1965
- Decimal Currency Act Amended: 1965/67/73
- Development Finance Corporation Act Amended: 1970/71/76/77
- Export Guarantee Act Amended: 1979/89/90
- Featherston County Council Empowering Act
- Human Tissue Act Amended: 1968/89
- Oamaru Harbour Board Loan and Empowering Act
- Perpetuities Act Amended: 1966/74
- Plumbers and Gasfitters Registration Act Amended: 1967
- Private Savings Banks Act Amended: 1970/72/77/78
- Rock Oyster Farming Act Amended: 1965
- Turangi Township Act Amended: 1973
- Uganda Act
- Wool Testing Authority Act Amended: 1973/80/87

Plus 100 acts amended

=== 1965 ===
- Auckland Harbour Board Central Area Properties Redevelopment Act Amended: 1968
- East Coast Bays Borough Empowering Act
- Extradition Act Amended: 1924/67/69/98/2002
- Hamilton Domain Endowment Act Amended: 1981
- Marlborough County Council Empowering Act Amended: 1980/83
- Narcotics Act Amended: 1970
- National Library Act Amended: 1971/73/76/77/85/87/89/91
- New Zealand - Australia Free Trade Agreement Act
- News Media Ownership Act
- Northland Harbour Board Act
- Oil in Navigable Waters Act
- Radiation Protection Act Amended: 1973/74/77/81/86/97
- Republic of Kenya Act
- Republic of Zambia Act
- Rotorua County Urban Farm Land Rating Act
- Taranaki Harbours Act Amended: 1968/70
- Taranaki Harbours Board Empowering Act
- Tauranga City Council and Tauranga Electric Power Board Empowering Act
- Territorial Sea and Fishing Zone Act
- Waikato Show Trust Act
- Waikohu County Council Empowering Act
- Wanganui Masonic Hall Trust Board Act
- Whangarei City Constitution Act
- Wheat Board Act Amended: 1969/70/76/77/80/81/86
- Winston Churchill Memorial Trust Act Amended: 1985/88

Plus 107 acts amended

=== 1966 ===
- Airport Authorities Act Amended: 1968/82/86/88/93/96/97/2000
- Alcoholism and Drug Addiction Act Amended: 1970/75/87
- Consumer Council Act Amended: 1969/80/82/85
- Hawke's Bay Catchment Board Rating Act
- Industrial Design Act Amended: 1974/79/82/87
- Inventions Development Act
- Levin Borough Empowering Act Amended: 1968
- Mangawai Lands Empowering Act
- Medical and Dental Auxiliaries Act Amended: 1968/69/72/74/78/81/88
- New Plymouth City Electricity and Gas Empowering Act
- Niue Act Amended: 1968/70/71/73/74/2007
- Northland Harbour Board Vesting and Empowering Act
- Palmerston North Reserves Empowering Act Amended: 1988/93/2003
- Republic of Malawi Act
- Republic of Singapore Act
- Republic of Tanzania Act
- Royal Antediluvian Order of Buffaloes Trust Act
- South Auckland Local Authorities Empowering Act
- Submarine Cables and Pipelines Protection Act Amended: 1977
- Tokoroa Town Empowering Act Amended: 1970

Plus 93 acts amended

=== 1967 ===
- Agricultural Pests Destruction Act Amended: 1968/71/72/74/75/77/79/80/82/86/88
- Animal Remedies Act Amended: 1968/69/71/72/76/81/82/94
- Animals Act Amended: 1969/74/76/77/80/81/82/83/90/91
- Auckland Harbour Board and Waitemata County Council Empowering Act
- Berryfruit Levy Act Amended: 1970/74/83/88
- Costs in Criminal Cases Act Amended: 1968
- Door to Door Sales Act Amended: 1973
- Electoral Poll Act
- Electricity Distribution Commission Act Amended: 1968/69
- Hauraki Gulf Maritime Park Act
- Insolvency Act Amended: 1972/76/78/81/85/86/87/90/93/94/98/99/2001/04
- Lesotho Act
- Natural Gas Corporation Act Amended: 1973/76
- Republic of Botswana Act
- Rotorua City Geothermal Energy Empowering Act
- Sale of Liquor Poll Act
- Tarawera Forest Act
- Technicians Training Act Amended: 1985
- The Nurse Maude District Nursing Association Act
- Water and Soil Conservation Act Amended: 1968/69/71/72/73/74/76/77/80/81/83/87/88/90

Plus 138 acts amended

=== 1968 ===
- Broadcasting Authority Act Amended: 1971
- Bryant Nursery Trust Board Enabling Act
- Christchurch Town Hall Empowering Act
- Customs Orders Confirmation Act
- Diplomatic Privileges and Immunities Act Amended: 1971/85/94/96/97/98/2004
- Guardianship Act Amended: 1969/70/71/73/77/79/80/82/83/85/88/91/94/95/96/98
- Litter Act Amended: 1970/85/90/2006
- Maori and Island Affairs Department Act
- Marine Farming Act Amended: 1975/76/77/83/87/90/92/93
- Maternal Mortality Research Act Amended: 1979
- Ministry of Transport Act Amended: 1971/72/73/75/79/83/88
- New Zealand Ports Authority Act Amended: 1969/70/78
- Protection of Depositors Act Amended: 1972
- Quantity Surveyors Act Amended: 1969/79/83/87/88
- Slack Adoption Act
- Swaziland Act
- Tawa Borough Empowering Act
- Tokoroa Agricultural and Pastoral Association Empowering Act
- Trespass Act Amended: 1981/87
- Vocational Training Council Act Amended: 1972/75/76/79/81/85/88
- Warkworth Anglican Burial Ground Act

Plus 125 acts amended

=== 1969 ===
- Administration Act 1969
- Building Research Levy Act Amended: 1975/82
- Clarke Adoption Act
- Consumer Information Act
- Food and Drug Act Amended: 1977
- Foote Adoption Act
- General Wage Orders Act
- Hotel Association of New Zealand Act Amended: 1994
- Manawatu Patriotic Society Act
- Mental Health Act Amended: 1954/57/58/59/61/72/75/76/77/79/82/85
- Minors' Contracts Act 1969 Amended: 1970/71/74/85/2005
- New Zealand Security Intelligence Service Act Amended: 1977/96/99/2003
- Public Bodies Leases Act Amended: 1971/76/80
- Republic of Nauru Act
- State Services Remuneration and Conditions of Employment Act Amended: 1970/71/73/75
- Status of Children Act Amended: 1971/78/79/83/87/90/94/2004/07
- Tauranga City Council Empowering Act Repealed: 1979
- Wairarapa Cadet Training Farm Act Amended: 1975

Plus 105 acts amended

== 1970s ==
=== 1970 ===
- Age of Majority Act
- Australia and New Zealand Banking Group Act
- Bay of Plenty Harbour Board Act
- Gisborne Harbour Board Loan and Empowering Act Amended: 1972
- Hutt County Special Rates Amalgamation Act
- Illegal Contracts Act Amended: 1985/2002
- Industrial Research and Development Grants Act
- Kapuni Petroleum Act Amended: 1976
- Marlborough Forestry Corporation Act Amended: 1983
- Mataura Borough Council Empowering Act
- National Heart Foundation of New Zealand Empowering Act
- Payroll Tax Act Repealed: 1973
- Plants Act
- Queen Elizabeth the Second Technicians' Study Award Act Amended: 1987/88/91
- Republic of Guyana Act
- Republic of The Gambia Act
- Te Aroha Borough Endowment Empowering Act
- Tonga Act

Plus 139 acts amended

=== 1971 ===
- Aircrew Industrial Tribunal Act Amended: 1977/78/79/82/84/85
- Armed Forces Discipline Act Amended: 1976/80/81/85/88/97/98/99/2001/03/05/07
- Auckland Improvement Trust Act Amended: 1973/86/2001
- Bank of New Zealand Officers' Provident Association Act Amended: 1957
- Consular Privileges and Immunities Act
- Department of Social Welfare Act Amended: 1981/88
- Franklin-Manukau Pests Destruction Act
- Gaming Duties Act Amended: 1976/86/91/92/95/96
- Hawke's Bay Hospital Board Empowering Act Amended: 1986
- Hire Purchase Act Amended: 1972/74/85/99
- Hovercraft Act
- Invercargill City Aluminium Smelter Water Supply Act
- Lake Waikaremoana Act
- Layby Sales Act Amended: 2000
- Marine Reserves Act Amended: 1975/77/80
- Northland Harbour Board Vesting Act
- Nurses Act Amended: 1975/80/83/85/90/94/99
- Primary Products Marketing Regulations Validation and Confirmation Act
- Queenstown Reserves Vesting and Empowering Act
- Race Relations Act Amended: 1980/89
- Racing Act Amended: 1974/77/79/80/83/86/88/89/92/95/2000/05/06/07
- Republic of Sierra Leone Act
- Seamen's Union Funds Act
- Stabilisation of Remuneration Act Amended: 1971
- Stamp and Cheque Duties Act Amended: 1972/74/75/76/77/78/80/81/82/83/88/89/91/92/93/94/95/96
- Unclaimed Money Act Amended: 1988/90

Plus 122 acts amended

=== 1972 ===
- Accident Compensation Act Amended: 1972/73/74/75/77/78/79/80/81/83/84/85/87/88/89/90/91/92
- Auckland Agricultural Pastoral and Industrial Shows Board Act
- Auckland Regional Authority Empowering Act
- Aviation Crimes Act Amended: 1973/99/2007
- Children's Health Camps Act Amended: 1979/83/85/88/91
- Clean Air Act Amended: 1982/86/87/88
- Equal Pay Act Amended: 1973/76/90/91
- Minister of Local Government Act
- Ministry of Energy Resources Act Amended: 1973
- National Art Gallery, Museum, and War Memorial Act Amended: 1978
- National Housing Commission Act Amended: 1977/86
- New Zealand Anglican Church Pension Fund Act
- Pacific Islands Polynesian Education Foundation Act Amended: 1975/81/87
- R O Bradley Estate Act Amended: 1994
- Republic of Bangladesh Act
- Republic of Sri Lanka Act
- St John's College Trusts Act
- Testing Laboratory Registration Act Amended: 1981/83/88/2006
- Unit Titles Act Amended: 1973/79/80/81/93/2003
- University of Albany Act Amended: 1973
- Wanganui Harbour Board Empowering Act
- Wellington Regional Water Board Act Amended: 1975/76/83
- Wool Marketing Corporation Act Amended: 1974/75/76

Plus 124 acts amended

== See also ==
The above list may not be current and will contain errors and omissions. For more accurate information try:

- Walter Monro Wilson, The Practical Statutes of New Zealand, Auckland: Wayte and Batger 1867
- The Knowledge Basket: Legislation NZ
- New Zealand Legislation Includes some imperial and provincial acts. Only includes acts currently in force, and as amended.
- Legislation Direct List of statutes from 2003 to order
