= List of statutes of New Zealand (1935–1949) =

This is a partial list of statutes of New Zealand for the period of the First Labour Government of New Zealand up to and including part of the first year of the First National Government of New Zealand.

== 1930s ==
=== 1936 ===
- Agricultural Workers Act Amended: 1937/77/79/80/81/82/83/84/85/87
- Ashburton Rivers Act
- Chatham Islands County Council Empowering Act Amended: 1963
- Employment Promotion Act
- Fair Rents Act Amended: 1937/39/41/42/47
- Geneva Convention Act
- Industrial Efficiency Act
- Law Reform Act 1936 Amended: 1955/57/96
- League of Nations Sanctions Regulations Confirmation Act
- Michael Connelly Appointment Validation Act
- Mortgagors and Lessees Rehabilitation Act Amended: 1937/61
- Political Disabilities Removal Act Amended: 1950
- Prevention of Profiteering Act
- Primary Products Marketing Act Amended: 1937/54/63/72/74/75/77/81/82/83/85/87/93/97
- Protection of British Shipping Act
- Regulations Act Amended: 1959/62/66/70
- Southland Electric-power Supply Act
- State Advances Corporation Act Amended: 1937/51/53/59/61/64/68/70/72
- Sumner Borough Empowering Act
- Taupiri Drainage and River Board Empowering Act
- United Wheatgrowers Act
- Whakatane Paper Mills, Limited, Water-supply Empowering Act
- William George David Brown Trust Act
- Wool Industry Promotion Act

Plus 33 acts amended

=== 1937 ===
- Air Department Act
- Air Force Act Amended: 1947
- Army Board Act
- Cawthron Institute Trust Board Rating Exemption Act
- Christchurch Tramway Board Empowering Act
- Greymouth Harbour Board Reconstitution Act
- Iron and Steel Industry Act Amended: 1965/88
- Motueka Borough Council Empowering Act
- Nelson Diocesan Trust Board Empowering Act
- Ngaruawahia Borough Council Empowering Act
- Petroleum Act Amended: 1953/55/62/65/67/74/75/80/82/85/88
- Physical Welfare and Recreation Act
- Sale of Wool Act
- School of Agriculture Act
- Share-milking Agreements Act
- Sovereign's Birthday Observance Act
- Thames Valley Drainage Board Empowering Act Amended: 1979
- Whangarei Airport Act

Plus 29 acts amended

=== 1938 ===
- Carter Observatory Act Amended: 1972/77/81/88
- Cornwall Park Trustees Rating Exemption Act
- Dunedin Drainage and Sewerage Board Empowering Act
- Joint Council of the Order of St John and The New Zealand Red Cross Society In Act
- King George the Fifth Memorial Fund Act
- Lower Clutha River Improvement Act Amended: 1939/43
- Nelson City Empowering Act
- New Zealand Centennial Act
- New Zealand Council of Law Reporting Act Amended: 1964/97/2006
- Palmerston North City Council Empowering Act
- Paritutu Centennial Park Act
- Social Security Act Amended: 1939/40/41/43/45/46/47/49/50/51/53/54/55/56/57/58/59/60/61/62/63/64/66/67/68/69/70/71/72/73/74/75/76/77/78/79/80/81/82/83/84/85/86/87/88/89/90/91/92/93/94/96/97/98/2000/01/05/06/07
- Stallions Act
- Surveyors Act Amended: 1960/62/71/72/76
- Tauranga Borough Council Empowering Act
- Wellington City Housing Act

Plus 12 acts amended

=== 1939 ===
- Adhesive Stamps Act
- Bluff Borough Empowering Act
- Domestic Proceedings Act Amended: 1958/70/71/72/74/75/76/78
- Emergency Regulations Act Amended: 1940/41/42/43/44/45/46/48/49/50/51/52/53/54/55/56/57/58/59/60/61/62/63
- Hire-purchase Agreements Act
- Legal Aid Act Amended: 1970/71/74/76/80/83/86
- Meat Act Amended: 1947/53/57/61/62/63/66/68/72/73/74/75/76/78/79/80/82/83/85/87/88/91/92/99
- New Zealand Library Association Act
- Papanui Memorial Hall Enabling Act
- Reserves and Other Lands Disposal Act Amended: 2000
- Rural Housing Act Amended: 1940/56/68/70
- Summary Penalties Act
- Visiting Forces Act Amended: 1957/61/81/97
- Wages Protection and Contractors' Liens Act Amended: 1914/52/58/61
- Waikato Airport Act
- War Expenses Act Amended: 1942

Plus 22 acts amended

== 1940s ==
=== 1940 ===
- Carriage by Air Act Amended: 1961/90/96
- Excess Profits Tax Act
- Insurance Companies Act
- Invercargill City Council Tramway Depreciation Fund Empowering Act
- Mokau Harbour Act
- National Savings Act Amended: 1956/59/60
- Termites Act Amended: 1963/64
- Waitara Borough Empowering Act
- Waitara Harbour Act
- War Pensions Extension Act

Plus 14 acts amended

=== 1941 ===
- Auckland Centennial Memorial Park Act Amended: 1947/52/62/83
- Auckland Community Welfare Centre and Auckland City Empowering Act Amended: 1948
- Awatere County Empowering Act
- Christchurch City Empowering and Special Rates Consolidation Act
- Counties Insurance Empowering Act Amended: 1980
- Kitchener Memorial Scholarship Trust Act Amended: 1983
- Lower Hutt City Empowering and Rates Consolidation Act
- Manaukau County Council Empowering Act
- National Development Loans Act
- Prolongation of Parliament Act
- Rehabilitation Act (New Zealand)|Rehabilitation Act Amended: 1944/47/52/53/55/57/59/63/69/86
- Soil Conservation and Rivers Control Act Amended: 1946/48/52/54/57/58/59/60/61/62/63/64/65/67/68/69/70/71/72/73/77/79/80/82/83/87/88
- Standards Act Amended: 1950/69/72/81/2003/06
- War Damage Act Amended: 1942
- Wellington Free Ambulance Act

Plus nine acts amended

=== 1942 ===
- Auckland City Housing Act
- Auckland City Market Empowering Act
- Homewood Trust Act Amended: 1952/79
- Invercargill City Special Rate Empowering Act
- Makerua Drainage Board Empowering Act
- Medical Advertisements Act
- Mina Tait Horton Estate Act Amended: 1955/57
- Overseas Representatives Act
- Women Jurors Act

Plus 10 acts amended

=== 1943 ===
- By-elections Postponement Act
- Canterbury Jewish Cemetery Empowering Act
- Commercial Gardens Registration Act
- Island Territories Act
- Ministry of Works Act
- Morris Divorce and Marriage Validation Act
- Napier Borough Empowering Act
- Otaki and Porirua Trusts Act Amended: 1946/69/77
- Papawai and Kaikokirikiri Trusts Act Amended: 1946/72
- Servicemen's Settlement and Land Sales Act Amended: 1945/46/48

Plus 13 acts amended

=== 1944 ===
- Annual Holidays Act Amended: 1945/50/62/74/76
- Auckland Metropolitan Drainage Act Amended: 1947/48/51/55/63
- Carterton Borough Empowering Act
- Clerks of Works Act Amended: 1961/63/66/74/76/80/87/88
- Earthquake and War Damage Act Amended: 1951/64/67/79/83/85/86/87/88/91
- Frustrated Contracts Act 1944 Amended: 2002
- Hawke's Bay Crematorium Act Amended: 1967
- Invercargill Licensing Committee Act
- Invercargill Licensing Trust Act Amended: 1954/67/69/74/78/85/86/88
- Lower Hutt City Empowering and Vesting Act
- Milk Act Amended: 1947/51/53/55/56/58/62/70/71/73/78/80/82/87
- Ngaitahu Claim Settlement Act
- Petone and Lower Hutt Gas-lighting Empowering Act
- Quarries Act Amended: 1951/54/61/72/73/75/77/80
- Taranaki Maori Claims Settlement Act
- United Nations Relief and Rehabilitation Administration Act
- Wool Industry Act Amended: 1950/52/61/64/66/78/81/83/88

Plus 14 acts amended

=== 1945 ===
- Ashburton Borough Special Rates Consolidation Act
- Atomic Energy Act Amended: 1957/59
- Balclutha Housing Act
- Bush Workers Act Amended: 1967/78/79/81/83
- Criminal Appeal Act
- Diplomatic Privileges Extension Act
- Electricity Act Amended: 1948/55/56/58/59/61/64/65/66/67/69/72/73/75/76/80/82/83/86/87/90/93/97/2000/01/03/04/05/06/07
- Employment Act
- Housing Improvement Act Amended: 1955
- Invercargill City Housing Act
- John Duncan McGruer Estate Act
- Linen Flax Corporation Act Amended: 1956/74
- Maori Social and Economic Advancement Act Amended: 1951/61
- Marianne Caughey Preston Estate Act
- Masterton Borough Housing Act
- Minimum Wage Act Amended: 1947/49/50/51/52/68/74/87/90/91/2003/07
- New Zealand Council for Educational Research Act Amended: 1976/91/2001
- New Zealand National Airways Act Amended: 1948/56/57/58/60/64/65/73/75
- Nurses and Midwives Act Amended: 1957/60/62/63/65/67
- Standard Time Act Amended: 1956
- Waimairi County Electrical Supply and Christchurch City Empowering Act
- Wool Disposal Act

Plus 24 acts amended

=== 1946 ===
- Dilworth Trust Board Act
- Land Subdivision in Counties Act Amended: 1953/54/55/58/59
- Local Government Commission Act Amended: 1962/63/64/69
- Lyttelton Borough Empowering Act
- Nassella Tussock Act Amended: 1948/53/59/65/68/70/72/74
- New Zealand Geographic Board Act Amended: 1988
- Ngaitahu Trust Board Act
- South Canterbury Catchment Board Act
- Stock-foods Act
- Tahunanui Town Board Empowering Act
- United Nations Act Amended: 1990
- Veterinary Services Act Amended: 1948/54/55/59/62/79/80/81
- Waikato-Maniapoto Maori Claims Settlement Act
- Waimakariri Harbour Act
- Wairoa Harbour Act

Plus 21 acts amended

=== 1947 ===
- Adult Education Act
- Canterbury Museum Trust Board Act
- Central Waikato Electric-power Board Empowering Act
- Contributory Negligence Act
- Control of Prices Act Amended: 1953/56/58/69/70/71
- Dairy Products Marketing Commission Act Amended: 1948/50/51/53/56/57/58/60
- Emergency Regulations Continuance Act
- Food and Drugs Act Amended: 1956/57/62
- Forest and Rural Fires Act Amended: 1948/51/52/62/63/87/89/90/96/2000/05
- International Air Services Licensing Act Amended: 1951/65
- J R McKenzie Trust Act Amended: 1970
- Lake Taupo Compensation Claims Act Amended: 1976
- Maori Purposes Act
- Masteron Licensing Trust Act
- Masterton Licensing Restoration Act
- Paeroa Borough Water-supply Empowering Act
- Patriotic and Canteen Funds Act Amended: 1948/49/50/51/52/53/56/60/64/67/70/73/79/87/2005
- Reporoa Drainage Board Empowering Act
- Riverton Borough Empowering Act
- Royal Titles Act
- Statute of Westminster Adoption Act
- Superannuation Act 1947 Amended: 1945/46/48/50/51/53/54/55/57/58/59/60/61/62/63/64/65/66/67/68/69/70/71/72/73/74
- Supply Regulations Act Amended: 1948/49/50/51/52
- Waerenga-a-hika Trust Act

Plus 38 acts amended

=== 1948 ===
- Apple and Pear Marketing Act Amended: 1950/51/54/59/60/62/67/68/74/77/79/80/81/82/86/87/88/93
- Armed Forces Canteens Act Amended: 1956/62/67/72/88
- Auckland Baptist Tabernacle Act
- Auckland City Council and Auckland Harbour Board Empowering Act
- British Nationality and New Zealand Citizenship Act Amended: 1959/62/65/69/73
- Bryant House Trust Board Enabling Act
- Civil Aviation Act Amended: 1955/58/60/61/62/63/69/70/71/75/76/77/82/87/88/89/91/92/93/96/99/2002/04/05/07
- Coal Act
- Economic Stabilization Act
- Gaming Poll Act
- General Agreement on Tariffs and Trade Act
- Government Service Tribunal Act Amended: 1949/50/52/55
- Hutt Valley Drainage Act Amended: 1949/52/53/58/64/71/74/78
- Invercargill City Gasworks and Electricity Empowering Act
- Land Valuation Court Act Amended: 1956/60/61/64/65/66/67
- Sutton Adoption Act
- Tenancy Act Amended: 1950/53/57/58/61/64/68/77
- Tokelau Islands Act Amended: 1963/67/69/70/71/74
- Trades Certification Act Amended: 1972/78/82/87/88
- Trustee Savings Banks Act Amended: 1956/57/58/61/62/64/66/68/69/70/72/75/76/77/78/79/82
- Tuberculosis Act Amended: 1950/57/58/73
- Valuers Act Amended: 1959/68/70/74/77/80/81/83/91/94/97/2005
- Westport Coal Company Act

Plus 51 acts amended and two acts repealed.

=== 1949 ===
- Auckland Harbour Development Act
- Balclutha Borough Council Empowering Act
- Deckston Hebrew Trust Act
- Education Lands Act Amended: 1950/56/60/67/75/79/91
- Fire Services Act Amended: 1952/53/56/57/58/59/61/62/63/65/66/67/68/69/70/71/74/75
- George and Annie Troup Trust Act
- Industrial Relations Act Amended: 1963/74/75/76/77/78/79/80/81/82/83/84/85
- Licensing Trusts Act Amended: 1950/51/53/55/59/61/62/64/67/68/69/70/71/72/74/75/76/77/78/80/85/86/88
- Military Training Act Amended: 1951/52/53/54/56
- Military Training Poll Act
- New Zealand Counties Association Act Amended: 1956/67/73/76/80
- Occupational Therapy Act Amended: 1954/59/64/72/80/94/99
- Physiotherapy Act Amended: 1953/61/64/69/72/74/82/94/99/2000
- Radioactive Substances Act
- Thames Borough Council Empowering Act
- Transport Act Amended: 1950/53/54/55/58/59/60/61/63/64/65/66/67/68/69/70/71/72/73/74/75/76/77/78/79/80/82/83/84/85/86/87/88/89/90/92/95/97/2000
- Whaingaroa Domain Disposal Act
- Whangarei Milk Authority Empowering Act
- Wool Labelling Act Amended: 1957/69/75

Plus 27 acts amended

== See also ==
The above list may not be current and will contain errors and omissions. For more accurate information try:

- Walter Monro Wilson, The Practical Statutes of New Zealand, Auckland: Wayte and Batger 1867
- The Knowledge Basket: Legislation NZ
- New Zealand Legislation Includes some imperial and provincial acts. Only includes acts currently in force, and as amended.
- Legislation Direct List of statutes from 2003 to order
