= List of statutes of New Zealand (1931–1935) =

This is a partial list of statutes of New Zealand for the period of the Liberal–Reform coalition Government of New Zealand up to and including part of the first year of the First Labour Government of New Zealand.

== 1930s ==
=== 1932 ===
- Auckland Transport Board Empowering Act
- Carterton and District Memorial Square Act
- Local Authorities Interest Reduction and Loans Conversion Act Amended: 1933/34
- Local Authorities' Sinking Funds Act
- Mortgagors and Tenants Further Relief Act
- Mortgagors and Tenants Relief Act Amended: 1932
- Municipal Association Act Amended: 1956/67/73/76/80
- National Expenditure Adjustment Act Amended: 1932/60/63
- New Zealand Debt Conversion Act
- Ohai Railway Board Act Amended: 1934/35/38/43/47/71/73/75
- Okarito Harbour Act
- Public Safety Conservation Act Amended: 1960
- Sales Tax Act Amended: 1933/68/74/85/86
- Thames Borough Commissioner Act Amended: 1934/37/40
- Thames Harbour Board Loans Adjustment Act
- Urban Farm Land Rating Act Amended: 1935/55
- Waitangi Endowment Act
- Waitangi National Trust Board Act Amended: 1958/68/79/82

Plus 28 acts amended

=== 1933 ===
- Auckland Metropolitan Milk Act Amended: 1935
- Bay of Plenty Licensing Committee Enabling Act
- Bluff Harbour Board and Bluff Borough Council Empowering Act Amended: 1934/39
- Canterbury University College Act Amended: 1953/56
- Card Tournaments Regulation Act
- Co-operative Pig-marketing Companies Act
- Coinage Act
- Greymouth Borough Relief of Unemployment Loan Validation Act
- New Plymouth Airport Act
- New Plymouth Borough Council and New Plymouth Harbour Board Empowering Act Amended: 1948
- New Zealand Branch of the British Red Cross and Order of St John Empowering Act
- Poor Prisoners' Defence Act
- Poultry-runs Registration Act
- Reserve Bank of New Zealand Act Amended: 1936/39/50/58/60/64/67/68/70/71/73/74/75/77/80/82/86/88/90/92/93/95/99/2003/06/07
- Royal Society of New Zealand Act Amended: 1964
- Victoria University College Act Amended: 1947
- Whakatane Harbour Board Vesting Act

Plus 29 acts amended

=== 1934 ===
- Agricultural Emergency Regulations Confirmation Act
- Board of Native Affairs Act
- Christchurch City Empowering Act Repealed: 1948
- Greymouth United Borough Rating Empowering Act
- Maori Purposes Fund Act Amended: 2001
- Mortgage Corporation of New Zealand Act Amended: 1935
- Native Plants Protection Act
- New Plymouth Borough Land Exchange and Empowering Act
- Oamaru Harbour Board Empowering Act
- Passports Act Amended: 1987/91/94/2002/03/05
- Poisons Act Amended: 1952/62/64/67/69
- Reciprocal Enforcement of Judgments Act Amended: 1990/92
- Rural Mortgagors Final Adjustment Act Amended: 1935
- Stock-remedies Act Amended: 1946/47
- Te Ore Ore River Board Rating Act
- Trustee Companies Protection Act
- Wairau River Board Empowering Act

Plus 31 acts amended

=== 1935 ===
- Colonial Light Dues Act
- District Grand Lodge of English Freemasons of Auckland Trustees Act
- Dunedin City Empowering Act
- Featherston County Water-race Districts Validation Act
- Hamilton Borough Council Empowering Act Amended: 1937
- Hauraki Plains County Eastern Water-supply Empowering Act
- Housing Survey Act
- Napier Airport Act Amended: 1938
- Napier Foreshore Extension Act
- Native Housing Act Amended: 1938
- Nelson Waterworks Extension Act Amended: 1936
- The New Zealand Institute for the Blind Rating Exemption Act
- Tobacco-growing Industry Act
- War Veterans' Allowances Act
- Whaling Industry Act Amended: 1974
- Will's Road Hall Act

Plus 27 acts amended

== See also ==
The above list may not be current and will contain errors and omissions. For more accurate information try:

- Walter Monro Wilson, The Practical Statutes of New Zealand, Auckland: Wayte and Batger 1867
- The Knowledge Basket: Legislation NZ
- New Zealand Legislation Includes some imperial and provincial acts. Only includes acts currently in force, and as amended.
- Legislation Direct List of statutes from 2003 to order
