= List of statutes of New Zealand (1972–1975) =

This is a partial list of statutes of New Zealand for the period of the Third Labour Government of New Zealand up to and including part of the first year of the Third National Government of New Zealand.

== 1973 ==
- Admiralty Act Amended: 1975
- Lake Wanaka Preservation Act Amended: 1988
- New Zealand Day Act
- Northland Harbour Board Administration Act
- Overseas Investment Act Amended: 1977/86/95/98
- Plant Varieties Act Amended: 1979
- Property Speculation Tax Act Repealed: 1979
- Rates Rebate Act Amended: 1974/76/78/79/94/2006
- Recreation and Sport Act Amended: 1987
- Rent Appeal Act Amended: 1977
- Services Export Development Grants Act Amended: 1976
- Shipping Corporation of New Zealand Act
- Syndicates Act
- Wellington City Council Empowering Act

Plus 103 acts amended and one act repealed.

== 1974 ==
- Children and Young Persons Act 1974 Amended: 1977/80/82/83
- Commonwealth Games Symbol Protection Act
- Cornish Companies Management Act Amended: 1978/80
- Farm Ownership Savings Act Amended: 1976/78/80/81/85/87
- Harbour Pilotage Emergency Act
- Hawke's Bay Harbour Board Act
- Home Ownership Savings Act Amended: 1976/81/86/87
- Housing Corporation Act Amended: 1986/87/89/91/92/2001
- Local Government Act Amended: 1975/76/77/78/79/80/81/82/83/84/85/86/87/88/89/91/92/93/94/95/96/97/98/99
- Macdonald Adoption Act
- Marine and Power Engineers' Institute Industrial Disputes Act
- Marine Pollution Act Amended: 1974/75/77/80/88/90
- Marlborough Agricultural and Pastoral Association Empowering Act
- Melanesian Trusts Act
- New Zealand Export-Import Corporation Act Amended: 1985/87
- New Zealand Superannuation Act Amended: 2005
- Niue Constitution Act
- Palmerston North Showgrounds Act
- Pork Industry Act
- Private Investigators and Security Guards Act Amended: 1978/95/2000/03
- Rural Banking and Finance Corporation Act Amended: 1976/82/87/88/89
- Time Act Amended: 1987
- Tobacco Growing Industry Act Amended: 1951/65/67/76/80/81 Repealed: 1987
- Wanganui Harbour Board Land Development Act
- Wheat Research Levy Act Amended: 1981/83

Plus 108 acts amended

== 1975 ==
- Antiquities Act
- Carterton Borough Council Forestry Empowering Act
- Christchurch City Forestry Empowering Act
- Commerce Act Amended: 1976/79/80/83/85/90/94/96/2001/03/04/05
- Disabled Persons Community Welfare Act Amended: 1979/80/82/84/88/91/97
- Domestic Actions Act
- Eastwoodhill Trust Act Amended: 1994
- Fire Service Act Amended: 1976/78/79/81/82/83/85/86/87/88/90/92/93/94/95/96/98/2000/02/05
- Misuse of Drugs Act Amended: 1978/79/80/82/85/86/87/92/95/96/97/98/2000/03/05/06
- Motor Vehicle Dealers Act Amended: 1976/79/82/85/86/89/94/99
- Mount Maunganui Borough Reclamation and Empowering Act
- New Zealand Walkways Act Amended: 1976/77/78/80/82/85/88/94
- Ombudsmen Act Amended: 1982/88/91/92/93/96/97/99/2003/05
- Private Schools Conditional Integration Act Amended: 1977/86/91/98
- Treaty of Waitangi Act Amended: 1977/85/88/93/98/2003/06
- Trustee Companies Management Act Amended: 1976/78/87
- Unsolicited Goods and Services Act
- Waitemata City Council Empowering Act

Plus 114 acts amended

== See also ==
The above list may not be current and will contain errors and omissions. For more accurate information try:

- Walter Monro Wilson, The Practical Statutes of New Zealand, Auckland: Wayte and Batger 1867
- The Knowledge Basket: Legislation NZ
- New Zealand Legislation Includes some imperial and provincial acts. Only includes acts currently in force, and as amended.
- Legislation Direct List of statutes from 2003 to order
