= List of statutes of New Zealand (1957–1960) =

This is a partial list of statutes of New Zealand for the period of the Second National Government of New Zealand up to and including part of the first year of the Second Labour Government of New Zealand.

== 1950s ==
=== 1958 ===
- Bluff Water Supply Act
- Companies Special Investigations Act Amended: 1959/63/80
- Gas Industry Act Amended: 1960/61/65/70/79/81
- Geneva Conventions Act Amended: 1987/2005
- Hastings Gas Company Act
- Kaikohe Borough Empowering Act
- Kawerau Borough Act
- Mackelvie Trust Act
- Marlborough Harbour Act Amended: 1959/60/62/77
- Motor-Vehicle Dealers Act Amended: 1959/64/66/67
- National Service Registration Act
- Police Act Amended: 1961/64/65/68/69/72/73/76/78/79/80/81/83/85/87/88/89/91/92/94/95/96/98/2000/03
- Putaruru Borough Empowering Act
- Simultaneous Deaths Act
- South Canterbury Electric Power Board Validation Act
- Southland Harbour Board Act
- Technicians Certification Act Amended: 1962/65/66/72
- Thomson Adoption Discharge Act
- Trade Practices Act Amended: 1961/64/65/71
- Warkworth Town Council Empowering Act

Plus 85 acts amended

=== 1959 ===
- Agricultural Chemicals Act Amended: 1963/67/68/70
- Bauxite Act Amended: 1960/64
- Blenheim Borough Special Rates Consolidation Act
- Construction Act Amended: 1966/67/68/69/70/71/72/73/75/76/77/78/81/83/87/89
- Electric Linemen Act Amended: 1966/70/75/85
- Hydatids Act Amended: 1960/61/63/65/71/72/73/75/80
- New Plymouth City Special Rates Consolidation Act
- Otago Central Electric Power Board Empowering Act
- Plunket Society Rules Act
- Public Bodies Contracts Act Amended: 1965/74/75/76
- Taumarunui Borough Special Rates Consolidation Act
- Tawa Borough Special Rates Consolidation Act
- Timaru Harbour Board Loan and Empowering Act
- Volunteers Employment Protection Act Amended: 1985/87/90/2004/07

Plus 89 acts amended

== 1960s ==
=== 1960 ===
- Antarctica Act Amended: 1970
- Auckland Regional Authority Establishment Act
- Cheques Act
- Chiropractors Act Amended: 1961/66/70/94/99
- Cooperative Freezing Companies Act
- Disabled Persons Employment Promotion Act Amended: 1985 Repealed: 2007
- Government Service Equal Pay Act
- Manapouri - Te Anau Development Act Amended: 1961
- Municipal Insurance Act Amended: 1965/66/67/68/70/72/73/75/81
- Nelson Railway Authorisation Act
- Republic of Ghana Act
- Southland Harbour Board Empowering Act
- Tamaki River Reclamation Act
- Te Kauwhata Town Council Empowering Act
- Trustee Companies Act Amended: 1968/72/74/75/79/83/90/2002
- Unit Trusts Act Amended: 1972/74/87/96/98/2001/04
- University Grants Committee Act
- University of Hawke's Bay Trust Act
- Waitangi Day Act Amended: 1963
- Wanganui Orphanage Trust Extension Act

Plus 95 acts amended

== See also ==
The above list may not be current and will contain errors and omissions. For more accurate information try:

- Walter Monro Wilson, The Practical Statutes of New Zealand, Auckland: Wayte and Batger 1867
- The Knowledge Basket: Legislation NZ
- New Zealand Legislation Includes some imperial and provincial acts. Only includes acts currently in force, and as amended.
- Legislation Direct List of statutes from 2003 to order
