= List of acts of the 54th New Zealand Parliament =

This is a list of acts passed during the 54th New Zealand Parliament (27 November 2023 onwards), the first parliament of the Sixth National Government of New Zealand (2023–present). For lists of earlier acts, see Lists of acts of the New Zealand Parliament.

== 2023 ==
This is a list of acts passed during the 54th New Zealand Parliament in 2023.

Title	Number	Date of Royal assent	Notes
Reserve Bank of New Zealand (Economic Objective) Amendment Act 2023	2023/64	19 December 2023	Urgent legislation repealing the dual mandate of the Reserve Bank of New Zealand.
Fair Pay Agreements Act Repeal Act 2023	2023/65	19 December 2023	Repeals the Fair Pay Agreements Act 2022.
Land Transport (Clean Vehicle Discount Scheme Repeal) Amendment Act 2023	2023/66	19 December 2023	Repeals the Clean Car Discount programme.
Secondary Legislation Confirmation Act 2023	2023/67	22 December 2023	
Resource Management (Natural and Built Environment and Spatial Planning Repeal and Interim Fast-track Consenting) Act 2023	2023/68	22 December 2023	Repeals the Natural and Built Environment Act 2023 and the Spatial Planning Act 2023.
Employment Relations (Trial Periods) Amendment Act 2023	2023/69	22 December 2023	Reinstates 90-day work trials.
Taxation Principles Reporting Act Repeal Act 2023	2023/70	22 December 2023	

== 2024 ==
This is a list of acts passed during the 54th New Zealand Parliament in 2024.

Title	Number	Date of Royal assent	Notes
New Zealand Productivity Commission Act Repeal Act 2024	2024/1	5 February 2024	Disestablishes the New Zealand Productivity Commission.
Water Services Acts Repeal Act 2024	2024/2	16 February 2024	Repeals the previous Labour Government's Three Waters reform programme.
Social Security (Benefits Adjustment) and Income Tax (Minimum Family Tax Credit) Amendment Act 2024	2024/3	21 February 2024	
Social Workers Registration Legislation Amendment Act 2024	2024/4	21 February 2024	
Pae Ora (Disestablishment of Māori Health Authority) Amendment Act 2024	2024/5	5 March 2024	Disestablishes the Māori Health Authority.
Smokefree Environments and Regulated Products Amendment Act 2024	2024/6	5 March 2024	Repeals the Smokefree Environments and Regulated Products (Smoked Tobacco) Amendment Act 2022.
Legal Services Amendment Act 2024	2024/7	7 March 2024	
Land Transport Management (Repeal of Regional Fuel Tax) Amendment Act 2024	2024/8	7 March 2024	
European Union Free Trade Agreement Legislation Amendment Act 2024	2024/10	7 March 2024	
Taxation (Annual Rates for 2023–24, Multinational Tax, and Remedial Matters) Act 2024	2024/11	28 March 2024	
Road User Charges (Light Electric RUC Vehicles) Amendment Act 2024	2024/12	28 March 2024	
Misuse of Drugs (Pseudoephedrine) Amendment Act 2024	2024/13	11 April 2024	Reversal on Pseudoephedrine ban.
Appropriation (2022/23 Confirmation and Validation) Act 2024	2024/14	27 May 2024	
New Zealand Superannuation and Retirement Income (Controlling Interests) Amendment Act 2024	2024/16	4 June 2024	
Immigration (Mass Arrivals) Amendment Act 2024	2024/17	28 March 2024	
Accident Compensation (Interest on Instalment Plans) Amendment Act 2024	2024/24	29 June 2024	
Forests (Log Traders and Forestry Advisers Repeal) Amendment Act 2024	2024/40-1	29 June 2024	
Land Transport (Clean Vehicle Standard) Amendment Act 2024	2024/59-1	29 June 2024	
Appropriation (2023/24 Supplementary Estimates) Act 2024	2024/58-1	29 June 2024	
Child Protection (Child Sex Offender Government Agency Registration) (Overseas Travel Reporting) Amendment Act 2024	2024/90-2	4 June 2024	
Waste Minimisation (Waste Disposal Levy) Amendment Act 2024	2024/54-4	4 June 2024	
Public Finance (Fines Collection Costs—Budget Measures) Amendment Act 2024	2024/51-1	4 June 2024	
Taxation (Budget Measures) Act 2024	2024/53-1	4 June 2024	
Whakatōhea Claims Settlement Act 2024	2024/261-2	4 June 2024	Legally entrenches some elements of the Whakatōhea deed of settlement, which was signed by Whakatōhea and the Crown in May 2023.
Imprest Supply (First for 2024/25) Act 2024	2024/64-1	29 June 2024	
Local Government (Electoral Legislation and Māori Wards and Māori Constituencies) Amendment Act 2024	2024/46-3	30 July 2024	Reinstates the poll requirement for Māori wards and constituencies
Sale and Supply of Alcohol (Winery Cellar Door Tasting) Amendment Act 2024	2024/29	1 August 2024	Allows winery cellar doors to charge visitors for the samples of their own wine and adds an off-licence category for wineries holding an on-licence.
McLean Institute (Trust Variation) Act 2024	2024 2024/Private bill 1	1 August 2024	Updates the dead of trust of the McLean Institute
Regulatory Systems (Education) Amendment Act 2024	2024/30	9 August 2024	
Resource Management (Extended Duration of Coastal Permits for Marine Farms) Amendment Act 2024	2024/56-2	2 September 2024	
Courts (Remote Participation) Amendment Act 2024	2024/29-1	2 September 2024	
Firearms Prohibition Orders Legislation Amendment Bill	2024/24-2	6 September 2024	
Local Government (Water Services Preliminary Arrangements) Act 2024	2024/52-3	2 September 2024	
Fair Trading (Gift Card Expiry) Amendment Act 2024	2024/35	16 September 2024	Prohibits the sale of gift cards with an expiry date of less than three years after the initial sale date.
Gangs Act 2024	2024/36	19 September 2024	Bans gang insignia, and introduces new anti-gang dispersal and non-consorting orders.
Sentencing Amendment Act 2024	2024/37	19 September 2024	Makes gang membership an aggravating actor in sentencing.
Education and Training Amendment Act 2024	2024/66-2	25 September 2024	Reinstates Charter schools in New Zealand.
Corrections Amendment Act 2024	2024/264-3	25 September 2024	
Appropriation (2024/25 Estimates) Act 2024	2024/55-1	30 September 2024	
Imprest Supply (Second for 2024/25) Act 2024	2024/79-1	30 September 2024	
Family Proceedings (Dissolution for Family Violence) Amendment Act 2024	2024/247-2	17 October 2024	Exempting victims of domestic violence from waiting for a mandatory two years to seek a divorce and allows them to seek such remedies upon the granting of a protection order from their spouse.
Gambling (Definition of Remote Interactive Gambling) Amendment Act 2024	2024/74-1	24 October 2024	
Resource Management (Freshwater and Other Matters) Amendment Act 2024	2024/47-3	24 October 2024	
Pae Ora (Healthy Futures) (Improving Mental Health Outcomes) Amendment Act 2024	2024/291-2	24 October 2024	
Contracts of Insurance Act 2024	2024/41-3	15 November 2024	
Contracts of Insurance (Repeals and Amendments) Act 2024	2024/41-3A	15 November 2024	
Climate Change Response (Emissions Trading Scheme Agricultural Obligations) Amendment Act 2024	2024/62-1	25 November 2024	
Building (Earthquake-prone Building Deadlines and Other Matters) Amendment Act 2024	2024/49	25 November 2024	
Citizenship (Western Samoa) (Restoration) Amendment Act 2024	2024/48	25 November 2024	Restores New Zealand citizenship to people born in Western Samoa between 1924 and 1949.
Racing Industry (Unlawful Destruction of Specified Greyhounds) Amendment Act 2024	2024/109-1	10 December 2024	Urgent legislation banning greyhound dogs from being killed while the Government takes action to phase out greyhound racing in New Zealand by July 2026.
Therapeutic Products Act Repeal Act 2024	2024/55	17 December 2024	Repeal the Therapeutic Products Act 2023, which would have increased regulations over therapeutic and medical products. The repealed legislation would have come into effect in 2026.
Sentencing (Reinstating Three Strikes) Amendment Act 2024	2024/54	17 December 2024	Reinstates the three strikes law in New Zealand.
Smokefree Environments and Regulated Products Amendment Bill (No 2)	2024/75-2	17 December 2024	
Residential Tenancies Amendment Act 2024	2024/52	17 December 2024	
Fast-track Approvals Act 2024	2024/31-3	23 December 2024	Establishes a new fast-track consenting regime for various resource extraction and building projects.
Corrections (Victim Protection) Amendment Act 2024	2024/11-3	23 December 2024	
Secondary Legislation Confirmation Act 2024	2024/68-2	23 December 2024	

== 2025 ==
This is a list of acts passed during the 54th New Zealand Parliament in 2025.

Title	Number	Date of Royal assent	Notes
Te Ture Whakatupua mō Te Kāhui Tupua 2025/Taranaki Maunga Collective Redress Act 2025	2025/293-2	1 February 2025	Accords legal personhood on Mount Taranaki as part of a Treaty of Waitangi compensation settlement with Taranaki Māori iwi (tribes).
Victims of Family Violence (Strengthening Legal Protections) Legislation Act 2025	2025/285-3	17 February 2025	
Overseas Investment (Build-to-rent and Similar Rental Developments) Amendment Act 2025	2025/61-2	24 February 2025	
Te Pire mō Ō-Rākau, Te Pae o Maumahara/Ō-Rākau Remembrance Act 2025	2025/33-2	24 February 2025	
Bail (Electronic Monitoring) Amendment Act 2025	2025/130-1	12 March 2025	
District Court (District Court Judges) Amendment Act 2025	2025/78-1	12 March 2025	
Te Korowai o Wainuiārua Claims Settlement Act 2025	2025/286-2	12 March 2025	
Crimes (Theft by Employer) Amendment Act 2025	2025/245-3	13 March 2025	Labour MP Camilla Belich's member's bill clarifies that an employer withholding an employee's wages is theft. While the bill was opposed by National and ACT (60 votes), it passed with the support of the Labour, Green, Māori and New Zealand First parties (63 votes).
Regulatory Systems (Economic Development) Amendment Act 2025	2025/50-2	29 March 2025	
Sentencing (Reform) Amendment Act 2025	2025/77-2	29 March 2025	
Land Transport (Drug Driving) Amendment Act 2025	2025/69-3	29 March 2025	
Taxation (Annual Rates for 2024–25, Emergency Response, and Remedial Measures Act 2025	2025/73-2	29 March 2025	
Arms (Shooting Clubs, Shooting Ranges, and Other Matters) Amendment Act 2025	2025/58-2	29 March 2025	
Customer and Product Data Act 2025	2025/44-2	29 March 2025	
Social Workers Registration Amendment Act 2025	2025/63-2	29 March 2025	
Fisheries (International Fishing and Other Matters) Amendment Act 2025	2025/263-2	29 March 2025	
Dairy Industry Restructuring (Export Licences Allocation) Amendment Act 2025	2025/88-2	29 March 2025	
Regulatory Systems (Immigration and Workforce) Amendment Act 2025	2025/49-2	29 March 2025	
Oranga Tamariki (Repeal of Section 7AA) Amendment Act 2025	2025/43-2	7 April 2025	Repeals Section 7AA of the Oranga Tamariki Act 1989
Building (Overseas Building Products, Standards, and Certification Schemes) Amendment Act 2025	2025/76-2	7 April 2025	
Wildlife (Authorisations) Amendment Act 2025	2025/22	13 May 2025	
Equal Pay Amendment Act 2025	2025/21	13 May 2025	Urgent legislation raising the threshold for making pay equity claims. As a result, 33 claims representing thousands of workers have to be dropped and refiled.
Social Security Amendment Act 2025	2025/103-3	21 May 2025	
Ngā Hapū o Ngāti Ranginui Claims Settlement Act 2025	2025/84-3B	21 May 2025	The Government apologises to the Māori iwi Ngāti Ranginui for land confiscations and a scorched earth campaign during the New Zealand Wars. This legislation compensates the tribe NZ$38 million and designates 15 sites of significances to the tribe.
Appropriation (2023/24 Confirmation and Validation Act 2025	2025/23	21 May 2025	
Social Assistance Legislation (Accommodation Supplement and Income-related Rent) Amendment Act 2025	2025/167-1	29 May 2025	
Taxation (Budget Measures) Act 2025	2025/157-1	29 May 2025	
Rates Rebate Amendment Act 2025	2025/162-1	27 June 2025	
Investment New Zealand Act 2025	2025/161-1	27 June 2025	
Racing Industry Amendment Act 2025	2025/101-3	27 June 2025	
Social Security (Mandatory Reviews) Amendment Act 2025	2025/158-1	27 June 2025	
Imprest Supply (First for 2025/26) Act 2025	2025/176-1	27 June 2025	
Appropriation (2024/25 Supplementary Estimates) Act 2025	2025/163-1	27 June 2025	
Victims of Sexual Violence (Strengthening Legal Protections) Act 2025	2025/274-3	27 June 2025	
Employment Relations (Pay Deductions for Partial Strikes) Act 2025	2025/104-2	30 June 2025	
Oversight of Oranga Tamariki System Legislation Amendment Act 2025	2025/92-2	30 June 2025	Designates the Independent Children's Monitor as a stand-alone independent Crown entity. Disestablishes the Children and Young People's Commission and reinstates the Children's Commissioner.
Outer Space and High-altitude Activities Amendment Act 2025	2025/185-1	25 July 2025	
United Arab Emirates Comprehensive Economic Partnership Agreement Legislation Amendment Act 2025	2025/141-1	25 July 2025	
Budapest Convention and Related Matters Legislation Amendment Act 2025	2025/81-3	30 July 2025	
Auckland Harbour Board and Takapuna Borough Council Empowering Amendment Act 2025	2025/91-2	5 August 2025	
Crown Minerals Amendment Act 2025	2025/82-3	5 August 2025	Repeals a 2018 law restricting new gas and oil exploration off the coast of Taranaki.
Resource Management (Consenting and Other System Changes) Amendment Act 2025	2025/105-3	20 August 2025	
Public Works (Critical Infrastructure) Amendment Act 2025	2025/149-3	26 August 2025	
Employment Relations (Employee Remuneration Disclosure) Amendment Act 2025	2025/32-2	26 August 2025	Member's bill by Labour MP Camilla Belich banning employers from imposing gag orders on workers talking about their salaries.
Evidence (Giving Family Violence Evidence in Family Court Proceedings) Amendment Act 2025	2025/30-2	26 August 2025	Member's bill by Labour MP Tracey McLellan extending the range of protections for those giving evidence of sexual assaults or family harm in the Family Court.
Local Government (Water Services) (Repeals and Amendments) Act 2025	2025/108-3A	26 August 2025	Split from the Local Government (Water Services) Bill on 13 August 2025.
Local Government (Water Services) Act 2025	2025/108-3	26 August 2025	Provides the legislative framework for the Government's Local Water Done Well programme.
Adoption Amendment Act 2025	2025/206-1	17 September 2025	Urgent legislation to prevent convicted abusers from adopting children from other countries.
Imprest Supply (Second for 2025/26) Act 2025	2025/202-1	17 September 2025	
Appropriation (2025/26 Estimates) Act 2025	2025/164-1	17 September 2025	
Privacy Amendment Act 2025	2025/292-3	23 September 2025	
Climate Change Response (Emissions Trading Scheme - Forestry Conversion) Amendment Act 2025	2025/174-2	23 September 2025	Introduces limits to restrict farm-to-forest conversions.
Customs (Levies and Other Matters) Amendment Act 2025	2025/112-1	23 September 2025	
Income Tax (FamilyBoost) Amendment Act 2025	2025/203-1	23 September 2025	
Hauraki Gulf / Tīkapa Moana Marine Protection Act 2025	2025/282-3	10 October 2025	
Broadcasting (Repeal of Advertising Restrictions) Amendment Act 2025	2025/No 55	19 October 2025	Allows radio and television stations to broadcast advertisements on public holidays such as Christmas Day, Good Friday, Easter Sunday and Anzac Day.
Education and Training (Vocational Education and Training System) Amendment Act 2025	2025/No 56	21 October 2025	
Disputes Tribunal Amendment Act 2025	2025/98-2	24 October 2025	
Building and Construction (Small Stand-alone Dwellings) Amendment Act 2025	2025/166-3	24 October 2025	Eases building rules around the construction of garden sheds, sleepouts and garages by removing the requirement between single storey buildings, property boundaries and other buildings.
Marine and Coastal Area (Takutai Moana) (Customary Marine Title) Amendment Act 2025	2025/83-3	24 October 2025	Raises the threshold for Māori foreshore and seabed claims.
Responding to Abuse in Care Legislation Amendment Act 2025	2025/97-3	24 October 2025	
Parliament (Repeals and Amendments) Act 2025	2025/71-3A	12 November 2025	
Parliament Act 2025	2025/71-3	12 November 2025	
Ngāti Pāoa Claims Settlement Act 2025	2025/215-2	12 November 2025	This Treaty of Waitangi settlement with Ngāti Pāoa includes NZ$23.5 million in financial compensation, recognising 12 "culturally significant" sites, and a formal Crown apology for historical land alienation.
Regulatory Standards Act 2025	2025/155-3	18 November 2025	Establishes principles to direct the development of regulations and legislation, which concern the rule of law, the courts' role, personal liberties, property rights, taxation, fees, levies, law-making practices (referred to as "good law-making), and regulatory oversight. It also intends to promote clear legislation and to reinforce the principles of equality before the law, judicial independence, and impartiality, hopefully avoiding retrospective effects on rights, liberties, freedoms, and obligations.
Companies (Address Information) Amendment Act 2025	2025/18-3	18 November 2025	Member's bill by Labour MP Deborah Russell allowing company directors to remove their home addresses from the companies' register to prevent harassment and stalking.
Medicine Amendment Act 2025	2025/134-3	18 November 2025	Ensures that medicines approved by similar countries also get approval in New Zealand. Passed with the support of all parties except independent MPs Tākuta Ferris and Mariameno Kapa-Kingi.
Education and Training Amendment Act 2025	2025/No. 65	18 November 2025	Removes the statutory requirement for school boards to implement the Treaty of Waitangi. 200 schools have written to the Education Minister, opposing the removal of the Treaty clause.
Land Transport Management (Time of Use Charging) Amendment Act 2025	2025/No. 66	18 November 2025	Allows local authorities to set up congestion charging schemes.
Auckland Council (Auckland Future Fund) Act 2025	2025/118-1	18 November 2025	
Statutes Amendment Act 2025	2025/80-2	26 November 2025	
Land Transport (Clean Vehicle Standard) Amendment Act 2025	2025/196-2	26 November 2025	Urgent legislation lowering the emission standards for "clean cars."
Crimes Legislation (Stalking and Harassment) Amendment Act 2025	2025/107-2	26 November 2025	Designates stalking as a criminal offence. The bill came into effect on 26 May 2026.
Crimes (Countering Foreign Interference) Amendment Act 2025	2025/93-2	26 November 2025	Extends offences related to espionage, wrongful communication, retention, or the copying of government information under the Crimes Act 1961. Criminalising deceptive acts on behalf of foreign states, with penalties of up to 14 years' imprisonment.
Education and Training (Early Childhood Education Reform) Amendment Act 2025	2025/191-2	26 November 2025	Creates and defines the responsibilities of the director of regulation for the early childhood sector.
Defence (Workforce) Amendment Act 2025	2025/200-1	26 November 2025	Enables the Chief of the New Zealand Defence Force to allow military personnel to replace striking civilian employees during industrial action.
Legal Services (Distribution of Special Fund) Amendment Act 2025	2025/160-2	27 November 2025	
Immigration (Fiscal Sustainability and System Integrity) Amendment Act 2025	2025/138-2	27 November 2025	Makes it an offence to knowingly seek or receive premiums for employment. Raises the bar for the detention of asylum seekers and establishes a new framework for electronic monitoring as an alternative to immigration detention.
Climate Change Response (2050 Target and Other Matters) Amendment Act 2025	2025/229-1	16 December 2025	
Animal Welfare (Regulations for Management of Pigs) Amendment Act 2025	2025/207-1	16 December 2025	Delays the phasing out of farrowing crates by ten years.
Fast-track Approvals Amendment Act 2025	2025/219-1	16 December 2025	Amends the Fast-track Approvals Act 2024 with the stated goal of fast-tracking supermarkets.
Resource Management (Duration of Consents) Amendment Act 2025	2025/232-1	16 December 2025	
Judicature (Timeliness) Legislation Amendment Act 2025	2025/159-4	19 December 2025	
Secondary Legislation Confirmation Act 2025	2025/182-1	19 December 2025	
Electoral Amendment Act 2025	2025/186-3	19 December 2025	Reduces the timeframe for voter registration to two weeks before election day, bans prisoners from voting, and allows larger anonymous political donations.
Te Pire Whakahoki i a Kororipo Pā/Kororipo Pā Vesting Act 2025	2025/197-2	19 December 2025	Gives effect to the Nelson Tenths settlement between the Te Tau Ihu Māori and the New Zealand Crown.

== 2026 ==
This is a list of acts passed during the 54th New Zealand Parliament in 2026.

Title	Number	Date of Royal assent	Notes
Child Protection (Child Sex Offender Government Agency Registration) Amendment Act 2026	2026/86-1	1 February 2026	Seeks to improve the child sex offender registry system so that offenders can more easily comply with it.
Ngātu Hāua Claims Settlement Act 2026	2026/139-3	9 February 2026	Implements the New Zealand Crown's Treaty of Waitangi settlement with Ngāti Hāua including NZ$19 million worth of financial redress, the return of 64 culturally-significant sites and posthumous pardons for Mātene Rita Te Whareaitu and Te Rangiātea.
Juries (Age of Excusal) Amendment Act 2026	2026/121-2	20 February 2026	Raises the jury excusal age from 65 to 72 years.
Employment Relations Amendment Act 2026	2026/175-3	20 February 2026	Tightens the criteria for personal grievances claims, creates a "gateway test" for differentiating between employees and contractors, ends payouts for employees dismissed for "serious misconduct," and eliminates a 30-day rule extending automatic collective agreement terms to new employees.
Anzac Day Amendment Act 2026	2026/133-2	20 February 2026	Extends Anzac Day recognition to all servicemen who have served New Zealand in conflicts, peacekeeping operations and other deployments.
Social Security (Accident Compensation and Calculation of Weekly Income) Amendment Act 2026	2026/248-2	10 March 2026	Clarifies the law on the impact of ACC payments on welfare entitlement to make sure the process is fair for everyone. Addresses an anomaly where those receiving lump sums got more compensation than those who received both ACC payments and welfare assistance at the same time.
Legislation Amendment Act 2026	2026/152-3	16 March 2026	
Taxation (Annual Rates for 2025–26, Compliance Simplification, and Remedial Measures) Act 2026	2026/199-3	30 March 2026	
Public Finance Amendment Act 2026	2026/165-3	2 April 2026	
Sale and Supply of Alcohol (Sales on Anzac Day Morning, Good Friday, Easter Sunday, and Christmas Day) Amendment Act 2026	2026/123-3	2 April 2026	Member's bill by Labour MP Kieran McAnulty allowing premises open on Good Friday, Anzac Day and Christmas Day to sell alcohol under normal license conditions but excludes liquors stores and supermarkets. It passed by a margin of 66 to 55 votes, with Members of Parliament exercising a conscience vote.
Resource Management (Auckland Housing) Amendment Act 2026	2026/294-1	2 April 2026	Reduces the minimum housing capacity requirement in Auckland by 32.5 percent from 2 million to 1.4 million homes.
Racing Industry (Closure of Greyhound Racing Industry) Amendment Act 2026	2026/208-2	9 April 2026	Enacts the legislative framework for phasing out greyhound racing by August 2026. It also establishes a transitional agency to facilitate the phasing out of the greyhound racing industry in New Zealand and rehoming the dogs.
Online Casino Gambling Act 2026	2026/178-3	28 April 2026	Controversial legislation legalising online casinos.
Appropriation (2024/25 Confirmation and Validation Act) Act 2026	2026/254-1	28 April 2026	
Carter Trust Amendment Act 2026	2026/193-2	6 May 2026	Private member's bill by National Party MP Mike Butterick dissolving the Carter Trust, established under the will of the late Charles Rooking Carter, and allows the Public Trust to distribute funds as the executor of the will.
Local Government (Auckland Council) (Transport Governance) Amendment Act 2026	2026/201-3	6 May 2026	Establishes the Auckland Regional Transport Committee as part of efforts to restructure Auckland Transport and redirect its decision-making functions to Auckland Council and local boards.
Ngāti Hei Claims Settlement Act 2026	2026/218-3	18 May 2026	Implements some elements of the 2017 Ngāti Hei Treaty of Waitangi settlement with the New Zealand Crown, including a NZ$8.5 million compensation package.
Anti-Money Laundering and Countering Financing of Terrorism Amendment Act 2-26	2026/114-3	18 May 2026	An omnibus bill that reforms New Zealand's anti-money laundering and counter-terrorism framework.
Ngāti Tara Tokanui Claims Settlement Act 2026	2026/177-3	18 May 2026	Implements Ngāti Tara Tokanui's Treaty of Waitangi settlement with the Crown, including a $6 million compensation package.
Regulatory Systems (Transport) Amendment Act 2026	2026/194-3	18 May 2026	An omnibus bill amending land transport, maritime, and aviation legislation.
Ngāti Rāhiri Tumutumu Claims Settlement Act 2026	2026/217-2	18 May 2026	Implements Ngāti Rāhiri Tumutumu's Treaty of Waitangi settlement with the Crown, including a $5.5 million compensation package.
Anti-Money Laundering and Countering Financing of Terrorism (Supervisor, Levy, and Other Matters) Amendment Act 2026	2026/181-3	18 May 2026	
Environment (Disestablishment of Ministry for the Environment) Amendment Act 2026	2026/249-2	2 June 2026	Disestablishes the Ministry for the Environment and transferring its statutory functions to the new Ministry for Cities, Environment, Regions and Transport (MCERT), effective 1 July 2026.
Public Service Amendment Act 2026	2026/190-2	2 June 2026	Removing the public service's representation, pay equity requirements and replacing the 34 government departmental "Long-term Insights Briefings" with one produced by the Department of the Prime Minister and Cabinet. Requiring public service chief executives to reapply for their job at the end of their term.
Building and Construction Sector (Self-certification by Plumbers and Drainlayers) Amendment Act 2026	2026/221-3	2 June 2026	Expands a self-certification scheme allowing skilled plumbers and drainlayers to sign off their own work to include more residential work and some commercial activity.
Financial Service Providers (Registration and Dispute Resolution) Amendment Act 2026	2026/136-2	5 June 2026	
Regulatory Systems (Internal Affairs) Amendment Act 2026	2026/188-2	5 June 2026	
Patents Amendment Act 2026	2026/154-1	5 June 2026	
Taxation (Budget Measures) Act 2026	2026/320-1	5 June 2026	Amends the Income Tax Act 2007, the Student Loan Scheme Act 2011, and the Tax Administration Act 1994, and contains tax measures announced as part of the 2026 New Zealand budget
Social Security (Modernisation) Amendment Act 2026	2026/313-1	5 June 2026	Urgent legislation allowing the Ministry of Social Development to use artificial intelligence to make decisions regarding people's welfare benefits. Also amends the Social Security Act 2018 and the Social Security Regulation 2018.
Credit Contracts and Consumer Finance Amendment Act 2026	2026/137-3	5 June 2026	Overhauls the regulation of financial services by transferring regulatory responsibility for the Credit Contracts and Consumer Finance Act 2003 (CCCFA) from the Commerce Commission to the Financial Markets Authority.
Gas (Market Transparency) Amendment Act 2026	2026/322-1	5 June 2026	Amends the Gas Act 1992 to make it easier for the Government to monitor the gas market and to help market participants make "more efficient" decisions.
Imprest Supply (First for 2026/27) Act 2026	2026/329-1	26 June 2026	
Appropriation (2025/26 Supplementary Estimates) Act 2026	2026/324-1	26 June 2026	
Redress System for Abuse in Care Act 2026	2026/209-3	30 June 2026	Introduces a presumption against financial redress for abuse survivors with certain serious sexual and violent offenders, who will still be entitled to other forms of redress.
Game Animal Council (Herds of Special Interest) Amendment Act 2026	2026/151-2	30 June 2026	Amends the Game Animal Council Act 2013 to eliminate the requirement to exterminate valued introduced species that have been designated as "herds of special interest."
Regulatory Systems (Tribunals) Amendment Act 2026	2026/115-2	9 July 2026	Amends tribunals and quasi-judicial bodies administered by the Ministry of Justice.
Regulatory Systems (Primary Industries) Amendment Act 2026	2026/256-2	9 July 2026	
Regulatory Systems (Occupational Regulation) Amendment Act 2026	2026/116-2	9 July 2026	
Constitution Amendment Act 2026	2026/187-2	9 July 2026	Amends the Constitution Act 1986 to improve the resilience of mechanisms that provide for the continuation of executive governance and the transition of power following an election.
Healthy Futures (Pae Ora) Amendment Act 2026	2026/179-2	9 July 2026	Amends the Pae Ora (Healthy Futures) Act 2022 to improve the effectiveness of health services delivery for patients.
Offshore Renewable Energy Act 2026	2026/102-2	9 July 2026	Establishes a legislative framework to govern the construction, operation, and decommissioning of offshore renewable energy developments.
Mental Health Act 2026	2026/87-2	9 July 2026	Repeals and replaces the Mental Health (Compulsory Assessment and Treatment) Act 1992 to create a new legislative framework for compulsory mental health care.
Health and Safety at Work Amendment Act 2026	2026/244-2	9 July 2026	Reverses 2015 workplace safety legislative changes that were passed following the 2010 Pike River Mine disaster.
Antisocial Road Use Legislation Amendment Act 2026	2026/189-2	9 July 2026	Omnibus legislation seeking to deter anti-social driving behaviour.
Infrastructure Funding and Financing Amendment Act 2026	2026/231-3	4 August 2026	Improve infrastructure funding and financing tools to support urban development.
Arms Act 2026	2026/233-3	5 August 2026	Repeals and replaces the Arms Act 1983 as the regulatory framework for firearms in New Zealand.
Employment Leave Act 2026	2026/259-2	6 August 2026	Repeals and replaces the Holidays Act 2003, with annual sick leave being accrued in hours rather than days.
English Language Act 2026	2026/198-1	6 August 2026	Designates the English language as one of New Zealand's three official languages.
Crimes Amendment Act 2026	2026/223-3	7 August 2026	Creates new offences for assaulting first responders and coward punching, raises the penalties for shoplifting and human trafficking, and expands citizen's arrest powers.
Climate Change Response (Tort Liability) Amendment Act 2026	2026/330-1	24 August 2026	Prevents lawsuits against companies for climate changing-emissions under tort law.
Te Here ā Nuku (Nelson Tenths) Act 2026	2026/328-3	24 August 2026	Entrenches the Nelson Tenths settlement into law.
Disability Support Services Act 2026	2026/312-2	3 September 2026	Provides a legal framework for the delivery of taxpayer-funded disability support services.
Emergency Management Act 2026	2025/236-2	3 September 2026	Replaces the Civil Defence Management Act 2002 and gives effect to the Government's response to a government inquiry into North Island "Severe Weather Events."
Social Security (Jobseeker Support and Accommodation Supplement) Amendment Act 2026	2026/306-2	3 September 2026	Tightens Jobseeker Support and Emergency Benefit eligibility criteria for 18 and 19-year olds based on a parental assistance test. Raises the income threshold for homeowners applying for the Accommodation Supplement from 30 to 40 percent.
Serious Fraud Office Amendment Act 2026	2026/281-2	3 September 2026	Amends and updates the provisions of the Serious Fraud Office Act 1990 dealing with search warrants and evidence admissibility including digital and cloud-based evidence.
Maritime Transport (Lifejackets on Recreational Craft) Amendment Act 2026	2026/143—2	11 September 2026	Requires everyone on recreational craft of six metres or less to wear a lifejacket.
Appropriation (2026/27 Estimates) Act 2026	2026/323-1	11 September 2026	
Ōtautahi Community Housing Trust (Trust Variation) Act 2026	2026/241-2	11 September 2026	Private member's bill by Labour MP Megan Woods amending the Ōtautahi Community Housing Trust to allow it to operate beyond Christchurch and the Banks Peninsula.
Imprest Supply (Second for 2026/27) Act 2026	2026/343-1	11 September 2026	
Ngā Hapū o Te Iwi o Whanganui Claims Settlement Act 2026	2026/308-2	11 September 2026	Implements the New Zealand's Crown settlement with Ngā Hapū o Te Iwi o Whanganui including $30 million in financial and commercial redress, a $15.5 million cultural revitalisation fund, and vesting 27 culturally significant sites.
Trust Horizon (Trust Variation) Act 2026	2026/252-2	11 September 2026	Private member's bill by National Party MP Dana Kirkpatrick amending the terms of trust of Trust Horizon to broaden its scope to include any charitable purpose within Whakatāne, Kawerau, Ōpōtiki and Kaingaroa.
Ngāti Ruapani mai Waikaremoana Claims Settlement Act 2026	2026/257-2	11 September 2026	Implements the New Zealand Crown's apology and $24 million settlement with Ngāti Ruapani, including renaming Tuai "Tūwai.
Local Government (System Improvements) Amendment Act 2026	2026/180-2	18 September 2026	Refocusing local government bodies on delivering core services, improving reportage on their performance and accountability, restricting council voting to elected members, and providing regulatory relief from costs associated with fast-track approved developments.
India Free Trade Agreement Legislation Amendment Act 2026	2026/327-2	18 September 2026	Implements the New Zealand–India Free Trade Agreement signed between New Zealand and India on 27 April 2026.
India Export Quotas (Apples, Kiwifruit, and Mānuka Honey) Act 2026	2026	18 September 2026	Companion bill to the India Free Trade Legislation Amendment Act 2026.
Summary Offences (Move-on Orders) Amendment Act 2026	2026/310-2	25 September 2026	Gives the Police dispersal powers to deal with disorderly behaviour including vagrancy and protests.
Oranga Tamariki (Responding to Serious Youth Offending) Amendment Bill	2024/99-2	25 September 2026	Amends the Oranga Tamariki Act 1989 to allow Youth Courts to send youth offenders to military style academies.
Policing Amendment Act 2026	2026/268-2	25 September 2026	Amends the Policing Act 2008 to reaffirm Police powers to record images and sounds in public spaces, collect personal information for lawful purposes and to expand temporary road closure powers.
Public Works Amendment Act 2026	2025/230-2	25 September 2026	Amends the Public Works Act 1981 to update provisions around land acquisition, objections and compensation functions.
Building (Earthquake-prone Buildings) Amendment Act 2026	2025/238-2	25 September 2026	Updates the regulatory framework for managing earth-quake prone buildings. Eases earthquake strengthening-rules in the upper North Island and the Chatham Islands.
Natural Environment Act 2026	2025/234-3	30 September 2026	One of two new bills replacing the Resource Management Act 1991 as the nation's main legislative framework for infrastructural and environment regulations.
Agricultural Compounds and Veterinary Medicines Amendment Act 2026	2026/305-3	30 September 2026	Amends the Agricultural Compounds and Veterinary Medicines Act 1997 to implement the recommendations of the Agricultural and Horticultural Products Regulatory Review.
Secondary Legislation Confirmation Act 2026	2026/333-2	30 September 2026	
Healthy Futures (Pae Ora) (3-Day Postnatal Stay) Amendment Act 2026	2024/37-2	30 September 2026	Gives mothers and their babies the right to remain in a post-natal facility for at least three days.
Planning Act 2026	2025/235-3	30 September 2026	Second of two new bills replacing the Resource Management Act 1991 as the nation's main legislative framework for infrastructural and environment regulations.
