= List of acts of the New Zealand Parliament (1891–1912) =

This is a list of acts of the New Zealand Parliament for the period of the Liberal Government of New Zealand up to and including part of the first year of the Reform Government of New Zealand.

== 1890s ==
=== 1890 ===
- Arbitration Act Amended: 1915/38/52/98/2007
- Borough of Devonport Empowering and Endowment Act
- Cattle Act
- Children's Protection Act
- Educational Reserves Leasing Act
- Epsom and Mount Eden Reserve Act
- Gimmerburn Forest Reserve Act
- Gold Duty Abolition and Mining Property Rating Act
- Horomona Paatu Land-grant Act
- Kaimarama Land Act
- Kihikihi Cemetery Reserve Leasing Act
- Mercantile Agents Act
- Native Schools Sites Act Extension
- Naval Reserves Vesting Act
- Oaths Act
- Omaka Recreation Reserve Sale Act
- Palmerston North Reserves Act Amended: 1994
- Post and Telegraph Classification and Regulation Act
- Primage Duty Act
- Roman Catholic Lands Act Extension
- School Committees Election Act
- Stratford County Act
- Timaru Charitable Aid Institution Vesting Act
- Timaru Harbour Board Empowering Act
- Todman Land-grant Act
- Tuakitoto and Kaitangata Lakes Act Amended: 1913/14
- Valpy Crown Grant Boundary Definition Act
- Volunteer Drill-sheds and Lands Trustees Validation Act
- Waiapu County Act
- Wellington School of Design and Exchange Act
- Westport-Ngakawau Railway Extension Act

Plus 17 acts amended

=== 1891 ===
- Auckland Electric Lighting Act
- Birds Nuisance Act
- Book-purchasers Protection Act
- Christchurch Electric Lighting Act
- Coal-mines Act Amended: 1908/09/10/14/15/19/20/22/24/27/33/35/36/37/41/47/49
- Educational Endowments and Reserves Exchange Act
- Factories Act Amended: 1902/10/16/36/45/53/56/61/66/69/71/72/73/78
- Greymouth Harbour Board Loan Act
- Hamerton Pension Act
- Hospital Trustees Act
- Land and Income Assessment Act Amended: 1912/13
- Legislative Council Act Amended: 1915/16/18/20
- McCabe Land-grants Act
- McLean Land Act
- New Plymouth Hospital Act
- New Zealand Bank Act Amended: 1958
- Official and Colonial Defences Secrets Act
- Palmerston North Hospital District Act
- Palmerston North Hospital Land Sales Validation Act
- Partnership Act
- Promoters' and Directors' Liability Act
- Public works Appropriation Act
- Railways Authorisation and Management Act
- Stratford County Districts Adjustment Act
- Thames Recreation Reserve Sale Revivor Act
- Thordon Esplanade Act
- Trafalgar Park Purchasing Act
- Truck Act
- University of Otago Council Election Act
- Wanganui Heads Signal-station Reserve Exchange Act
- Wanganui River Trust Act Amended: 1912/20/22
- Water-supply Act Amended: 1913
- Wellington Botanic Garden Vesting Act
- Wellington Boys' Institute Act
- Wellington Chew's Lane Encroachment Act
- Wellington Electric Lighting Act

Plus 20 acts amended

=== 1892 ===
- Auckland University College Land Exchange Act
- Contractors' and Workman's Lien Act
- Cook and Waiapu Counties Property Adjustment Act
- Dairy Industry Act Amended: 1915/22/24/26/33/38/54/55/57/75/76/80/89/2000
- Dempsey Trust Act Amended: 1951
- Hukarere Native Girls' School Act Amended: 1927
- Kaihau Trust Money Act
- Kaipo Reserve Act
- Kaitangata Relief Fund Transfer Act
- Land for Settlements Act Amended: 1895/1901/27
- Land-tax and Income-tax Act
- Manure Adulteration Act
- Mere Taka Land-grant Act
- Mount Ida Water-race Act
- Napier Harbour Board Further Empowering Act
- Napier Harbour Board Loan Act Amended: 1937/39/51
- Napier Native Hostelry Site Sale Act
- Native Land Purchases Act
- Oamaru Harbour Board Advance Repayment Act
- Oamaru Racecourse Trustees Empowering Act
- Ocean Beach Public Domain Act Amended: 1920
- Offensive Publications Act
- Ohinemuri County Ridings Validation Act
- Orakei Succession Further Investigation Act
- Palmerston North Couthouse Site Sale Act
- Palmerston North Hospital Vesting Act
- Patea Harbour Endowment Act
- Payment of Members Act
- Petone Corporation Loan Empowering Act
- Provincial Ordinances Act
- Public Reserves Vesting and Sale Act Amended: 1895/96
- Rohe Potae Investigation of Title Act
- Servants' Registry Offices Act Amended: 1960
- Shops and Shop-assistants Act
- Te Aroha Recreation-ground and Racecourse Act
- Unclaimed Lands Act
- Waikouaita Reserves Act
- Waiorongomai Bridge Act
- Wanganui Harbour Board Endowment Sale Act
- Wanganui Hospital Board Vesting Act
- Wellington City Sanitation Loan Empowering Act
- Wellington Corporation and Harbour Board Streets and Lands Act
- Westland Churches, Schools, and Hospital Vesting Act
- Westland, Grey, Inangahua, and Buller Counties Vehicle Licensing Act

Plus 19 acts amended

=== 1893 ===
- Alcoholic Liquors Sale Control Act
- Auckland Domain Vesting Act Amended: 1986
- Auckland Hospital Reserves Exchange Act
- Bank-note Issue Act
- Cheviot County Act
- Cheviot Estate Disposition Act
- Cheviot Estate Payment Act
- Civil Service Insurance Act
- Civil Service Officers' Guarantee Act Repealed: 1914
- Colliery Railways Vesting Act
- Counties Vehicle Licensing Act
- Criminal Code Act Amended: 1901/05
- District of Palmerston North Hospital and Charitable Aid Board Empowering Act
- Dunedin Garrison Hall Trustees Empowering Act
- Electoral Act Amended: 1934/37/40/45/48/50/51/53/54/58/59/60/63/65/67/69/71/72/74/75/76/77/79/80/81/83/85/86/87/89/90/91/92/93/95/96/2002/04/05/07
- G. W. Ell Empowering Act
- Gore Electric Lighting Act
- Halswell River Drainage District Act
- Hawera Borough Council Enabling Act
- Infant Life Protection Act
- Kaiapoi Borough Corporation Vesting Act
- Kaitangata Cemetery Site Sale Act
- Kiwitea County Act
- Kyngdon Land-grant Act
- Land Drainage Act Amended: 1894/98/1908/13/20/22/23/52/56/58/64/65/67/68/71/72/74/75/76/78/80/88
- Lyttelton Orphanage Lands Vesting Act
- Magistrates' Courts Act Amended: 1909/13/20/22/26/27/30/50/55/56/60/61/63/64/66/67/69/70/71/74/75/77/78
- Mahinapua Creek and Lake Reserves Act
- Mangatu No. 1 Empowering Act
- Mangawai Harbour Endowment Reserve Act
- Mokoreta Cemetery Reserve Act
- Native Land Court Certificates Confirmation Act
- Native Land Purchase and Acquisition Act
- Native Trusts and Claims Definition and Registration Act
- Niramona Pini Land Act
- Oamaru Loans Consolidation Act
- St. Albans Public Library Transfer Act
- Stock Act Amended: 1913/27/30/38/50/52/54/55/56/57/58/59/60/61/62/63/64/65
- Submarine Telegraph Cables Protection Act
- Tairua Land Act
- Taranaki Relief Fund Distribution Act
- Wanganui Harbour Board Act
- Wanganui Hospital Board Empowering Act
- William Robinson Estate Trusts Act

Plus 25 acts amended

=== 1894 ===
- Abattoirs and Slaughterhouses Act
- Bank Directors and Shares Transfer Act
- Bank of New Zealand Share Guarantee Act
- Bank Shareholders Act
- Banking Act Amended: 1914/21/35
- Borough of Oamaru Leasing Act
- Companies' Accounts Audit Act
- Designation of Districts Act Amended: 1909
- Dunedin Loans Conversion Act
- Dunedin Waterworks Account Act
- Eketahuna Cemetery Reserve Act
- Foreign Insurance Companies' Deposits Act Amended: 1895/1910
- Gaming Act Amended: 1910/14/15/20/24/49/50/53/55/59/60/61/62/63/64/65/67/68/70/71/72
- Government Advances to Settlers Act Amended: 1908
- Greymouth Harbour Board Empowering Act Amended: 1986
- Hamilton Domains Empowering Act
- Hastings Borough Loan Validation and Empowering Act
- Inangahua County Council Empowering Act
- Income-tax Act
- Indictable Offences Summary Jurisdiction Act Amended: 1900/07
- Industrial Conciliation and Arbitration Act Amended: 1901/03/04/05/08/10/11/13/20/21/22/24/27/28/32/36/37/39/43/47/51/53/56/58/60/61/62/63/64/65/66/67/68/69/70/72
- James Mitchell Trust Act
- Jubilee Institute for the Blind Reserve Act
- Kirikiri Native School Site Act
- Lake Forsyth Drainage Act
- Land-tax Act Amended: 1921
- Lands Improvement and Native Lands Acquisition Act
- Legitimation Act Amended: 1921
- Levels County Act
- Light and Air Act
- Little Barrier Island Purchase Act
- Middle District of New Zealand University College Act
- Mining Districts Land Occupation Act
- Mount St. John Reserve Act
- Native Land Court Certificate Confirmation Act
- Native Lands Claims and Boundaries Adjustment and Titles Empowering Act
- New Zealand Consols Act
- Ngaere and other Blocks Native Claims Adjustment Act
- Pohangina County Act
- Post and Telegraph Department Act
- Public Trust Office Consolidation Act
- Railways Authorisation Act
- School Attendance Act
- Sea-fisheries Act Amended: 1903
- Taonui Branch Railway Act
- Timaru Harbour District Rating Act
- Timaru Harbour Reclamation Act
- Tongariro National Park Act Amended: 1927/48
- Waimakariri-Ashley Water-supply Board Loan Act
- Wellington City Drainage Empowering Act
- Westland County Council Enabling Act

Plus 19 acts amended

=== 1895 ===
- Agricultural and Pastoral Statistics Act
- Auckland and Parnell Endowment Lands Act
- Auckland Harbour Board and Devonport Borough Exchange of Land Act
- Bank of New Zealand and Banking Act
- Customs Duties Reciprocity Act
- Dunedin Drainage and Sewerage Act
- Dunedin Loans Consolidation Act
- Family Homes Protection Act
- Fernhill Railway Purchasing Act
- Hamilton Gasworks Act
- Hawksbury Borough Council Reserve Vesting Act
- Hikutaia No 1 Block Boundary Act
- Horowhenua Block Act
- Invercargill Corporation Reserve Exchange Act
- Kaihu Valley Railway Extension Act
- Local Authorities' Loans Conversion Act
- Manual and Technical Elementary Instruction Act
- Margarine Act Amended: 1964/72/78/80
- Masterton Trust Lands Trust Empowering Act
- Native Land Claims Adjustment Act
- Native Townships Act Amended: 1903/19
- New Zealand Institute of Journalists Act
- Pastoral Tenants' Relief Act
- Patea Foreshore Vesting Act
- Poisons Importation and Carriage Act Amended: 1902
- Public Securities Act
- Public-School Teachers Incorporation and Court of Appeal Act
- Puniu Reserves Sale Act
- Reserves Disposal and Exchange Act
- Sale of Goods Act Amended: 1961/2003
- Threshing-machine Owners' Lien Act
- Timaru Public Park and Garden Domain Reserve and Otipua Domain Reserve Vesting Act
- Unclassified Societies' Registration Act
- Uniforms Act
- Wages Attachment Act
- Waimate Municipal Reserves Act
- Wellington Corporation and Hospital Contributors Exchange Act
- Wilson Land Act

Plus 41 acts amended

=== 1896 ===
- Aid to Public Works and Land Settlement Act
- Alcoholic Liquors Inspection Act
- Asiatic Restriction Act
- Bishop Suter Art Gallery Trustees Act
- Borough of Masterton Water-supply and Drainage-works Loan Empowering Act
- Canterbury College and Canterbury Agricultural College Act Amended: 1910/22
- Caversham Waterworks Account Act
- Dunedin City Borrowing Act
- Gisborne Harbour Board Empowering Act Amended: 1953
- Government Railways Department Classification Act
- Government Valuation of Land Act
- Lake Forsyth Lands Vesting Act
- Lyttelton Harbour Board Enlargement Act
- Married Persons Summary Separation Act
- Mataura Reserve Vesting Act
- Mount Wellington Public Domain Board and Thomas Morrin Exchange of Land Act
- Naval and Military Claims Settlement and Extinguishment Act
- Ngatitoa Trust Act
- Oamaru Harbour Board Leasing Act
- Orchard and Garden Pests Act
- Otago Boys' and Girls' High Schools Board Empowering Act
- Photographic Copyright Act
- Picton Recreation Reserve Act Amended: 1921
- Poverty Bay Land and Deeds Registration Districts Act
- Public Morgues Act
- Railways Compensation Adjustment Act
- Rating on Unimproved Value Act Amended: 1903
- Registration of People's Claims Act
- Reserves and Crown Lands Disposal and Enabling Act
- St Albans Borough Council Special Loan Enabling Act
- Tauranga Educational Endowment Reserves Act
- The Electrical Motive-power Act
- The Female Law Practitioners Act
- The Greytown Trustees Empowering Act
- Tobacco Excise Duties Act
- Urewera District Native Reserve Act Amended: 1909/10
- Waimakariri Harbour Board Land Act
- Westport Harbour Board Loan Act

Plus 35 acts amended

=== 1897 ===
- Awarua Seat Inquiry Act
- Bluff Harbour Board Empowering Act
- Borough of Lyttelton Corporation Enabling Act
- Cyanide Process Gold-extraction Act
- Government Emergency Loans to Local Bodies Act
- Hawera Gasworks and Electric Lighting Act
- Invercargill Racecourse Trustees Empowering Act
- Joseph Houston Land-grant Act
- Kapiti Island Public Reserve Act
- Kohukohu Foreshore Reclamation Act
- Lyttelton Harbour Board Loan Act
- Members of the House of Representatives Disqualification Act
- Napier Municipal Corporation and Napier Harbour Board Exchange of Lands Empower Act
- Sunday Labour in Mines Prevention Act
- Victoria College Act Amended: 1914/23
- Wellington City Sanitation Loan Act
- Wellington Education Board Transfer of Reserve Act

Plus 19 acts amended

=== 1898 ===
- Admiralty House Act
- Akitio County Act
- Borough of Masterton Private Roads Act
- Borough of Onehunga Water-supply Act
- Canterbury College Powers Act
- Clutha River Board Empowering Act
- Clyde Recreation-ground Sale and Disposal Act
- Divorce Act
- Eketahuna County Act
- Hannaton Church Site Act
- Homing-pigeons Protection Act
- Inebriates Institutions Act Amended: 1902/03
- Johnsonville School Reserve Act
- Kauri-Gum Industry Act
- Little River Domain Board Empowering Act
- Mairetahi Loan Conversion Act
- McLean Motor-car Act
- Municipal Franchise Reform Act
- New Plymouth Borough Reserves and Street Exchanges Act
- Old-age Pensions Act Amended: 1901/02/08/09/10/11
- Onehunga Cemetery Act
- Petone Corporation Lighting and Sanitation Loans Empowering Act
- Port Chalmers Mechanics' Institute Reserves Vesting Act
- Rabbit-proof Wire-netting Fences Act
- Reserves, Endowments, and Crown and Native Lands Exchange, Sale, Disposal, and Act
- Richmond Borough Council Empowering Act
- Road Districts Validation Act
- Shearers' Accommodation Act
- Slander of Women Act
- Stratford Electric Lighting Act
- Thames Borough Loans Conversion Act
- Unclaimed Moneys Act Amended: 1958
- University of Otago Leases and Securities Act
- Wairarapa North County Loan Act
- Wairarapa South County Loan Act
- Wairoa Harbour Board Empowering and Loan Act
- Wanganui Hospital Board Empowering Act 1893 Extension Act
- Wellington City Reclamation and Public Baths Act
- Wellington Harbour Board and Corporation Empowering Act
- Wellington Harbour Board Reclamation and Empowering Act
- Wellington High Levels Tramway Act Amended: 1935

Plus 19 acts amended

=== 1899 ===
- Auckland City Borrowing Act
- Auckland Grammar School Act Amended: 1928/55/66
- Borough of Port Chalmers Borrowing Act
- Borough of Stratford Private Roads Act
- Canterbury College and Canterbury Agricultural College Indemnity Act
- Christchurch City Borrowing Act
- Christchurch Domains Trust Indemnity Act
- Cutten Trust Act
- Employment of Boys or Girls without Payment Prevention Act
- Gore Agricultural and Pastoral Association Empowering Act
- Government Accident Insurance Act Amended: 1924/62
- Heathcote Road District Sanitation Act
- Immigration Restriction Act Amended: 1908/10/20/23/31/33/35/51/58/59/60/61/62
- Invercargill Garrison Hall Trustees Empowering Act
- Labour Day Act
- Licensing Poll Regulation Act
- Linwood and Woolston Boroughs Borrowing Act
- Linwood Borough Loan Act
- Local Government Voting Reform Act
- Marlborough High School Act
- Mauriceville County Act
- Melrose Borough Gas Act
- Municipal Franchise Reform Extension Act
- Ohinemuri County Electric Power and Lighting Act
- Pacific Cable Authorisation Act
- Payment of Jurors Act
- Police Provident Fund Act
- Rotokare Domain Act
- Stratford Borough Empowering Act
- Te Aroha Borough Reserve Act
- Thames Harbour Board Empowering Act
- Wages Protection Act Amended: 1983/85/91
- Wellington City Streets Act
- Whakatane County Act

Plus 19 acts amended

== 1900s ==
=== 1900 ===
- Alexandra Borough Race Enabling Act
- Bank of New Zealand Officers' Guarantee and Provident Association Act
- Borough of Rangiora Water-supply Act
- British Investors in New Zealand Government Securities Act
- Bubonic Plague Prevention Act
- Canterbury College Empowering Act
- Castlepoint County Act
- Civil Service Examination Act
- Coromandel Harbour Board Dissolution Act
- Crown Tenants' Rent Rebate Act
- Deceased Husband's Brother Marriage Act
- Devonport Borough Enabling Act
- Dunedin City and Suburban Tramways Act
- Dunedin District Drainage and Sewerage Act Amended: 1916/21/23/25/30/37/47/51/66/83
- Education Boards Election Act
- Egmont National Park Act Amended: 1927/33
- Gisborne Harbour Board Further Empowering Act
- Greytown Electric Lighting and Loan Empowering Act
- Hakataramea Public Hall Act
- Hawera Borough Drainage Empowering Act
- Hawera Borough Reserves Act
- Hobson Bay Watershed Sewage Act
- Hospitals and Charitable Aid Boards Act
- Imprisonment for Debt Limitation Act Amended: 1903/14/67/72/89
- Land for Settlements Consolidation Act
- Manawatu Railway Purchasing Act
- Manual and Technical Instruction Act
- Maori Councils Act Amended: 1903
- Maori Lands Administration Act Amended: 1901
- Masterton County Act
- Midland Authorised Area Land-settlement Act
- Military Pensions Extension to Contingents Act
- Mokau Harbour Board Act
- Native Interpreters Classification Act
- New Zealand Ensign Act
- New Zealand Institute of Surveyors and Board of Examiners Act
- Noxious Weeds Act Amended: 1910/21/23/27/34/56/60/71
- Pacific Cable Act
- Paeroa Gasworks Act
- Pahiatua Gasworks Act
- Public Contracts Act
- Public-School Teachers' Salaries Act
- Queenstown Electric Lighting Act
- Rotorua Town Council Act
- Shorthand Reporters Act Amended: 1951
- Slaughtering and Inspection Act Amended: 1910/18/27/30/34
- Supreme Court Judge Appointment Act
- Testator's Family Maintenance Act Amended: 1903
- Thames Borough Endowment Leasing Act
- Thames Borough Waterworks Account Act
- Trading-stamps Abolition and Discount-stamps Issue Act
- Wellington City Betterment Act
- Wellington City Leasing Act
- Wellington Corporation Land Exchange Act
- Westport-Ngakawau Railway Act
- Workers' Compensation for Accidents Act Amended: 1903

Plus 32 acts amended

=== 1901 ===
- Accident Compensation Act
- Arbitration Court President Validation Act
- Borough of Mataura Loan Validation Act
- Borough of Mornington Tramways Act
- Cemetery Trustees Validation and Appointment Act
- Charitable Gifts Act
- Charitable Institutions Rating Act
- Chatham Islands County Act
- City of Auckland Loans Consolidation and Auckland City Borrowing Acts Amendm Act
- Cook and other Islands Government Act
- Cornwall Park Duties Exemption Act
- Cyanide Process Extension Act
- Egmont County Act
- Exportation of Arms Act
- Featherston County Act
- Flax Grading and Export Act
- Gore Cemetery Reserve Vesting and Enabling Act
- Government Advances to Settlers Extension Act
- Greytown Reserves Vesting and Disposal Enabling Act
- Inch-Clutha Road, River, and Drainage Act Amended: 1921
- Invercargill Reserve Landing Act
- Kairanga County Act
- Kiwitea County Council Offices Act
- Local Authorities Indemnity Act
- Local Bodies' Goldfields Public Works and Loans Act
- Lyttelton Borough Council Empowering Act
- Manawatu Railway Sale and Purchase Empowering Act
- Maori Antiquities Act
- Masterton Public Park Management Act
- Miners' Rights Fee Reduction Act
- Money-lenders Act Amended: 1933
- Mortgages of Land Act
- Nurses Registration Act Amended: 1920
- Opium Prohibition Act
- Pariroa Native Reserve Act
- Physical Drill in Public and Native Schools Act
- Presbyterian Church of New Zealand Act
- Remuera Waterworks Empowering Act
- Reserves and other Lands Sale Disposal, and Enabling and Public Bodies Empow Act
- Rhodes Trust Act
- Rotorua Town Council Validation and Extension Act
- Royal Visit Expenses Act
- State Coal-mines Act Amended: 1902
- Templeton Domain Board Empowering Act
- Timber Export Act
- Victoria College Site and Wellington College and Girls' High School and Well Act
- Wesleyan Church Reserve Vesting Act
- Westland and Nelson Coalfields Administration Act Amended: 1926
- Woodville County Act

Plus 27 acts amended

=== 1902 ===
- Accident Insurance Companies Act Amended: 1972/77
- Balclutha Reserves and Empowering Act
- Bluff Harbour Board Representation Act
- Bluff Harbour Foreshore Reclamation and Leasing and Borrowing Act
- Christchurch City Council Empowering Act
- Christchurch Tramways District Act Amended: 1912
- City of Christchurch Electric Power and Loan Empowering Act
- Courthouse-sites Exchange Act
- Dilworth Trustees Act
- Dunedin Town Belt Roads Closing and Regulation Act Amended: 1984
- East Coast Native Trust Lands Act Amended: 1912
- Egmont County Districts Adjustment Act
- Government Railways Superannuation Fund Act
- Hawera Borough Betterment Act
- Hawera County Electric Lighting Act
- Hawera Hospital District Act
- Land and Deeds Registration Districts Act
- Land Titles Protection Act
- Law Societies Act
- Licensing Committees and Polls Act
- Manual and Technician Instruction Act
- Masterton Borough Betterment Act
- Masterton Trustees Empowering Act
- Methodist Church of Australasia in New Zealand Act
- Midland Railway Petitions Settlement Act
- Motor-cars Regulation Act
- Mount Herbert County Act
- Nelson City Streets and Reserves Act
- New River Harbour Reclamation Act
- North Canterbury Common Hospital Reserve Act
- Oxford and Cust Road Districts Alteration of Boundaries Act
- Pacific Cable Extension Act
- Pahiatua County Council Empowering Act
- Second-hand Dealers Act Amended: 1934
- Solicitors' Bills of Costs Act
- Statutes Compilation Act Amended: 1915
- Towns Main Streets Act
- Tukituki bridge Loans Act
- University of Otago Empowering Act
- Victoria College Site Act
- Waihi Hospital District Act
- Waikokopu Harbour Board Act
- Waimarino County Act
- Weber County Act
- Wellington Harbour Board Empowering Act

Plus 29 acts amended and two acts repealed.

=== 1903 ===
- Arbitration Court Emergency Act
- Australian and New Zealand Naval Defence Act
- Borough of Dannevirke Electric Power and Loan Empowering Act
- Borough of Gore Electric Power Empowering Act
- Bush and Swamp Crown Lands Settlement Act
- Carterton Borough Water-supply Act
- City of Auckland Empowering Act
- City of Christchurch Special Loans Enabling Act
- City Single Electorates Act
- Clutha Floods Relief Fund Trustees Empowering Act
- Coastwise Trade Act
- Collingwood County Act
- Commissioners Act
- Dairy Industry Act Extension Act
- Dramatic Copyright Act
- Dunedin City and Suburban Tramways and Water-power Act Amended: 1911
- General Assembly Library Act
- Gore Athenaeum Reserve Vesting and Empowering Act
- Government Railways Superannuation Fund Contributions Act
- Grand Lodge of Freemasons of New Zealand Trustees Act Amended: 1957/64
- Huirangi Domain and Huirangi Institute Empowering Act
- Hutt Mechanics' Institute Sale Act
- Hutt Railway and Road Improvement Act Amended: 1911/19
- Hutt Road Act Amended: 1917/22
- Intestates' Estates Act
- Juvenile Smoking Suppression Act
- Kawhia and Awakino Counties Act
- Labour Department Act Amended: 1936/70/73/79/85
- Masterton Hospital Contributors Empowering Act
- Mokau River Trust Act
- Mutual Fire Insurance Act Amended: 1913/25/34
- National Scholarships Act
- New Plymouth Borough and Taranaki Hospital Exchange Act
- Otago Dock Trust Electric Lighting Act
- Paeroa-Waihi Railway Act
- Patea Harbour Board Foreshore Act
- Patriotic Funds Act
- Port Chalmers Corporation Empowering Act
- Poukawa Native Reserve Act Amended: 1910
- Preferential and Reciprocal Trade Act
- Presbyterian College Site Act
- Products Export Act Amended: 1929/35
- Public Loans Renewal Act
- Queen's Scholarships Act
- Road and Town Districts Rating Act
- Sand-drift Act
- Scenery Preservation Act Amended: 1906/10/15/26/33
- School Committees' Funds Act
- Secondary Schools Act
- Shipping and Seaman Act
- St Albans Special Loan Validation and Empowering Act
- State Fire Insurance Act Amended: 1912/22/28/62
- Taranaki and Hawera Hospital Districts Apportionment Act
- Taranaki School Commissioners and Borough Exchange Act
- Thames Harbour Board Empowering Act
- Timaru Harbour District and Harbour Board Act
- Timber Export Duty Act
- Treasury Bills Extension Act
- Waiapu Hospital District Act
- Waihi Hospital Board Act
- Waikokopu Harbour Act
- Waimate County Water-races Validation Act
- Wainono Drainage District Adjustment Act
- Wanganui Suburbs Lighting Act
- Water-power Act
- Wellington City Recreation-ground Act
- Wellington Corporation Leasing Act
- Wellington Hospital Contributors Empowering Act
- Whangarei Borough Repayment of Kensington Park Rate Enabling Act
- Wireless Telegraphy Act

Plus 42 acts amended and one act repealed.

=== 1904 ===
- Ammunition-supply Act
- Ashburton Water-supply Act
- Auckland Harbour Board Loan and Empowering Act
- Auckland Waterworks Extension Act
- Borough of South Dunedin Empowering Act Amended: 1909
- Carrington Compensation Award Satisfaction Act
- Christchurch Domains Act Amended: 1911/13/23/37/43
- Divorce and Matrimonial Causes Acts Compilation Act
- Domain Boards Act
- Education Acts Compilation Act
- Fertilisers Act Amended: 1962/72
- Hamilton Parsonage Site Act Amended: 1937/94
- Hawke's Bay and Waipawa United District Charitable Aid Board Empowering Act
- High Commissioner Act
- Hokitika Harbour Board Empowering Act
- Inglewood Town Board Leases Validation Act
- Local Elections Act
- Marriage Acts Compilation Act
- Midwives Act
- Native Land Duty Abolition Act
- Native Land Rating Act
- Nelson City Lands Vesting Act
- Nelson Town School Site Exchange Act
- New Zealand Loans Act Amended: 1910/14/15/47/56/62/67/68/69
- Otago University Reserves Act
- Public Officers' Appointment and Powers Act
- Railway Service Computation Act
- Railways Improvements Authorisation Act
- Remuera Road District Borrowing Act
- Roman Catholic Bishop of Christchurch Empowering Act
- Shops and Offices Act Amended: 1910/13/15/17/20/21/27/36/45/46/51/59/65/70/71/72/74/75/78
- South Canterbury Hospital and Charitable Aid Board Empowering Act
- Stephen Cole Moule Trustees Empowering Act
- Strafford Hospital District Act
- Supreme Court Judges' Salaries Act
- University Degrees Act
- Waipori Falls Electrical Power Act
- Waitara Harbour Board Foreshore Endowment Act
- Waitomo County Act

Plus 22 acts amended

=== 1905 ===
- Agricultural Implement Manufacture, Importation, and Sale Act
- Auckland Cemetery Bridge and City Borrowing Act
- Auckland Harbour Board and Devonport Borough Council Empowering Act
- Borough of Birkenhead Enabling Act
- Canterbury Agricultural College Reserves Act
- Civil Service Classification Act
- Coal-mines Acts Compilation Act
- Dannevirke Education Reserve Transfer Act
- Eastbourne Borough Act
- Education Board of the District of Otago Empowering Act
- Ellesmere Lands Drainage Act Amended: 1912
- Eltham Borough Drainage and Water-supply Empowering Act
- Eltham Public Hall Act
- Epuni Leases Surrender Act
- Evidence Act Amended: 1926/45/50/52/58/62/63/66/72/73/74/76/77/80/82/85/86/87/88/89/90/94/95/98/2000/05/07
- Gerhard John Mueller Enabling Act
- Havelock Harbour Board Act Amended: 1910/53
- Hokitika Harbour Act Amended: 1908
- Horowhenua Lake Act
- Industrial Conciliation and Arbitration Acts Compilation Act
- Invercargill Cemetery Vesting Act
- Kaiapoi Native Reserve Act
- Lyttelton Borough Council Foreshore Vesting Act
- Lyttleton Harbour Board Land Act
- Maori Land Settlement Act
- Marriages Validation Act
- Masterton Public Park Extension Act
- Medical Practitioners Registration Act
- Mining Acts Compilation Act
- Motor Registration Act
- Motueka Harbour Board Act Amended: 1936
- Native Townships Local Government Act
- Nelson Harbour Act Amended: 1920
- New Zealand International Exhibition Empowering Act
- Oamaru Borough Council Loan Act
- Oamaru Volunteer Drill-shed Site Act
- Oxford Road District Act
- Paeroa Domain Loan Validation Act
- Palmerston North High School Reserve Act
- Petone and Hutt Corporations Empowering Act
- Petone Borough Empowering Act
- Petone Corporation Waterworks Act
- Property Law Act Amended: 1927/28/32/39/50/51/53/57/59/61/63/65/67/68/71/75/76/77/80/82/83/86/93/94/95
- Public Works Acts Compilation Act
- Sentry Hill-New Plymouth Railway Deviation Act
- Tapanui Commonage Reserve Act
- Taranaki Scholarships Act
- Teachers' Superannuation Act
- Timaru Borough Drainage, Sewerage, and Loans Act
- Timber and Flax Royalties Act
- Waikaka Branch Railway Act
- Wallace Hospital District Act
- Wanganui Harbour Act
- Wellington Hospital Contributors and Society for Relief of the Aged Needy Ex Act
- Workers' Dwellings Act Amended: 1914

Plus 30 acts amended

=== 1906 ===
- Apiaries Act Amended: 1913/20/51/53/56/58/65/67/71/73/78/80
- Auckland Girls' Grammar School Act
- Auckland Savings-bank Educational Special Donation Act
- Bank-shares Transfer Act
- Borough of Port Chalmers and Otago Dock Trust Exchange of Land Act
- Christchurch Tramway District Act Amended: 1910/21/26/27/32/39/49/50/51/54/60/63/66/70/74/75
- City of Dunedin Lands Vesting Act Amended: 1965
- Customs Duties Adjustment Act
- Eketahuna Borough Act
- Eltham County Act
- Fire Brigades Act Amended: 1908/13/14/32
- Firearms Act
- Gladstone Streets Vesting and Empowering Act
- Government Advances to Workers Act
- Greytown Trustees Empowering Act
- Habitual Criminals and Offenders Act
- Habitual Drunkards Act
- Jubilee Institute for the Blind Act
- Juvenile Offenders Act
- Kensington Park Rate Exemption Act
- Motor Regulation Act
- Napier Athenaeum and Mechanics' Institute Empowering Act
- Napier Harbour Board Exchange of Lands Empowering Act
- Napier Hospital Site Extension Act
- New Plymouth Borough and the Taranaki School Commissioners Exchange Act
- New Zealand and South African Customs Duties Reciprocity Act
- New Zealand International Exhibition Act
- Onslow Borough Drainage Empowering Act
- Otago Dock Validation Act
- Otago Presbyterian Church Board of Property Act Amended: 1884/1925/30/39/48
- Palmerston North Dairying School Act
- Petone Borough Streets Act
- Private Hospitals Act
- Reserves and other Lands Disposal and Public Bodies Empowering Act
- Roman Catholic Bishop of Auckland Empowering Act
- Sale of Explosives Act
- Sandy Point and Grasmere Domains Vesting Act
- Savings-banks Profits Act
- Scaffolding Inspection Act
- South Island Landless Natives Act
- State Coal-mines Account Act
- Thames Deep Levels Enabling Act
- Timaru Harbour District Act
- Timaru Public Library Act
- Tourist and Health Resorts Control Act Amended: 1977
- Training-ships Act
- Vincent and Maniototo Hospital Districts Act
- Waimate Agricultural Reserve Dairy School Act
- Waimumu Stream Drainage Act
- Wellington City Reclamation and Empowering Act

Plus 35 acts amended

=== 1907 ===
- Agricultural Labourers' Accommodation Act
- Auckland Harbour Board and Birkenhead Borough Empowering Act
- Butter Export Act
- Canterbury College Endowment Act
- Co-operative Dairy Companies Act Amended: 1950/51/56/76/78
- Dunedin Suburban Gas Company Empowering Act
- Flour and other Products Monopoly Prevention Act
- Foreign Tribunals Evidence Act
- Gisborne Harbour Board Enabling Act Amended: 1922
- Gore Agricultural and Pastoral Association Vesting and Enabling Act
- Gore Streets Act
- Hastings Recreation Reserve Act
- Hutt Park Act Amended: 1914
- Levin Borough Reserves Vesting and Empowering Act
- Makara County Act
- Maniototo Hospital and Charitable Aid Act
- Marine Insurance Act Amended: 1975
- Methylated Spirit Act
- National Endowment Act
- Native Land Settlement Act
- Nelson Hospital and Charitable Aid Board Empowering Act
- Nelson Institute Act
- New Plymouth Borough Electric and Waterworks Loans Validation Act
- New Zealand and South African Customs Treaty Ratification Act
- Ngatimaru Landless Natives Act
- Otaki and Porirua Empowering Act
- Packet Licenses Act
- Parliamentary and Executive Titles Act
- Petone Water-supply Conservation Act
- Post and Telegraph Classification Act
- Post-Office Savings-Bank Funds Investment Act
- Public Service Classification Act
- Public Service Superannuation Act
- Purangi Landless Natives Act
- Rangitatau Block Exchange Act
- Reserve Fund Securities Act
- Rotorua Town Act
- Taieri Land Drainage Act Amended: 1914
- Tapanui Hospital Reserve Vesting Act
- Tariff Act Amended: 1989/90/91/94
- Taumarunui Town Council Election Validation Act
- Tohunga Suppression Act
- Waipawa Borough Act
- Waipawa County Act
- Waipukurau County Act
- Wairau Harbour Board Act
- Waitara Harbour District and Empowering Act
- Whangamomona County Act
- Whangarei Harbour Act

Plus 34 acts amended and one act repealed.

=== 1908 ===
List at NZLII (see also the 1908 Consolidation)

- Auckland and Manukau Canal Act
- Auckland University College Land Act
- Carterton Borough Council Vesting and Enabling Act
- Christchurch City Betterment Act
- Christchurch City Sanitation Empowering Act Amended: 1922/27
- Consolidated Statutes Enactment Act
- Declaratory Judgments Act Amended: 1966
- Education Reserves Leases Validation and Empowering Act
- Gonville and Castlecliff Tramway District Act
- Gore Public Library Vesting Act
- Hauraki Plains Act Amended: 1911/12/13/14/22
- Hawera Technical School Site Exchange Act
- Hutt Valley Tramway District Act
- Inangahua County Empowering Act
- Incorporated Societies Act Amended: 1920/22/30/51/53/65/71/76/81/83/93/2005
- Land-tax Income-tax Act
- Lincoln Road Board Empowering Act
- Local Authorities Superannuation Act Amended: 1912/24
- Local Authorities' Indemnity Act
- Matamata County Act
- Meikle Acquittal Act
- Mental Hospitals Reserves Act
- Murchison County Act
- Napier Public Baths Act
- Naval Subsidy Act
- New Plymouth Harbour Board Empowering Act Amended: 1952
- New Zealand Society of Accountants Act Amended: 1909/13/15/63/68/71/74/77/78/82/92/93
- Oamaru Reserves Act
- Ohakune Town Board Election Validation Act
- Ohura County Act
- Opunake Harbour Act Amended: 1909/12
- Otago Dock Trust Merger Act Amended: 1909
- Otago Heads Native Reserve Road Act
- Palmerston North Dairy School Reserve Act
- Patents, Designs and Trade-Marks Act (On Wikidata)
- Public Bodies' Leases Act Amended: 1914
- Quackery Prevention Act
- Roman Catholic Archbishop of Wellington Empowering Act
- Ross Goldfields Electric Power Transmission Act
- Second Ballot Act
- Taupo No 2 Block Act
- Validation Court Empowering Act
- Waikohu County Act
- Waimate West County Act
- Waipuka Block Road Revesting Act
- Wellington and Manawatu Railway Purchase Act
- Whakatane Foreshore Reclamation Act
- Whangarei Abattoir Site Act
- Workers' Compensation Act Amended: 1909/11/13/20/26/36/43/45/47/49/50/51/52/53/54/58/59/60/62/63/64/66/67/68/69/70/71/72/78/80

Plus 33 acts amended

=== 1909 ===
- Auckland City Loans Consolidation and Empowering Act
- City of Auckland Enabling Act
- Death Duties Act Amended: 1911/20/23/25/26/50/52/53
- Ellesmere Domain Board Empowering Act
- Finance Act
- Grey Lynn Domain Vesting Act
- Heathcote Road Board Waterworks Act
- Inferior Courts Procedure Act Amended: 1979
- Inglewood Technical-school Site Act
- King-country Licenses Act
- Kiwitea County Validation Act
- Land for Settlements Administration Act
- Land Settlement Finance Act Amended: 1910
- Masterton Trust Lands Exchange Act
- McLean Institute Act
- Naval Defence Act Amended: 1922/36/50/51
- New Plymouth Harbour Reclamation Act
- New Plymouth Recreation and Racecourse Reserve Exchange Act
- New Zealand State-guaranteed Advances Act Amended: 1910/11/12
- Otago Dock Trust Lands Reclamation and Street-widening Act
- Otago Hospital Board Kaitangata Reserve Vesting Act
- Race Meetings Act
- Reefton Recreation Reserve Act
- Reformatory Institutions Act Amended: 1918/32
- Roman Catholic Archbishop Empowering Act
- Roman Catholic Bishop of Auckland Special Powers Act
- Rotoiti Validation Act
- Taranaki Agricultural Society Empowering Act
- Tawera County Act
- Timaru Borough Loans Consolidation Act
- Tokomaru Freezing-works Site Act
- Waimairi County Act
- Waipara County Act
- Waipukurau Reserve Act
- Wairewa County Act
- Waitara Borough Reserves Vesting Act
- Wanganui Roman Catholic Lands Act
- Wanganui School Sites Act Amended: 1911/13

Plus 19 acts amended

== 1910s ==
=== 1910 ===
- Aid to Water-power Works Act
- By-laws Act
- Census and Statistics Act Amended: 1915
- Commercial Trusts Act
- Exhibitions Act Amended: 1963
- Fruit-farms Settlement Act
- Greymouth Harbour Board Loans Consolidation Act Amended: 1910
- Hastings Borough Loan Empowering Act
- Horowhenua County Loan Act
- Inalienable Life Annuities Act
- Indecent Publications Act 1910 Amended: 1954/58/61/72/77/82/83/86
- Invercargill Tramway Buildings and Works Site Act
- Kaiapoi Reserve Act
- Kaitieke County Act
- Land-tax and income-tax Act
- Lyttelton Harbour Board Reclamation and Empowering Act
- National Provident Fund Act Amended: 1914/15/19/25/31/42/46/54/55/56/57/58/59/60/61/62/63/64/65/66/67/71/72/76/77/82/83/88
- Nelson City Drainage Loan and Empowering Act
- Oamaru Harbour Board Enabling Act
- Otago Harbour Board Lands Vesting Act
- Phosphorus Matches Act
- Public Debt Extinction Act
- Public Holidays Act Amended: 1921/48/62
- Rangitaiki Land Drainage Act Amended: 1913/14/23/48/57/69
- Secret Commissions Act
- Selwyn County Subdivision Act
- Stone-quarries Act Amended: 1911/20/22
- Taranaki Scholarships Endowment Act
- Templeton Domain Alteration of Boundaries Act
- Thermal Springs Districts Act
- Waihou and Ohinemuri Rivers Improvement Act Amended: 1912/58
- Waikouaiti County Council Reserve Vesting Act
- Waitara Harbour Board and Borough Empowering Act
- Wanganui Church Acre Act Amended: 1917/31
- Wanganui Harbour Board Vesting Act
- Wellington City Milk-supply Act Amended: 1914/26/33
- Woodville Borough Drainage Empowering Act
- Wyndham Showground Reserve Act

Plus 59 acts amended and one act repealed.

=== 1911 ===
- Ashley Subdivision, and the Waimakariri-Ashley Water-supply Board Act
- Auckland Electric-power Station Site Act
- Auckland Grammar School Site Act
- Awatere County Act
- City of Christchurch Empowering Act
- Dunedin Technical School Site Act
- Elingamite Rehearing Act
- Franklin and Manukau Counties Act
- Greytown Town Lands and Hospital Lands Exchange Act
- Hamilton Domains Act Amended: 1922
- Heathcote County Boundary Act
- Invercargill Reserves Vesting Act
- Kaikoura Hospital Site Act
- Little River Domain Board Act
- Lyttelton Borough Extension Act Amended: 1915
- Manukau Harbour Control Act
- Mental Defectives Act Amended: 1914/21/28/35/50/51
- Methodist Charitable and Educational Trusts Act Amended: 1971/76/88
- Methodist Church of New Zealand Act
- Mosgiel Borough Empowering Act
- Oamaru Municipal Exchange and Market Reserve Leasing Act
- Onehunga Borough Vesting Act Amended: 1957
- Papakaio Water-race District Validation Act
- Patents, Designs, and Trade-marks Act Amended: 1913/14/24/29/39/43/46/47 (On Wikidata)
- Portobello Road District Lands Vesting Act
- Railways Authorization Act
- Representation Commissions' Reports Validation Act
- Riverton Harbour Loan and Empowering Act
- Ross Borough Council Vesting and Empowering Act Amended: 1912
- Sir Donald McLean Memorial Park Act
- Tapanui Commonage Reserve Exchange and Leasing Act
- University of Otago Council Act
- Waikoikoi Public Hall Transfer Act
- Waikowhai Park Act
- Wanganui River Bridge No 2 Act
- Widows' Pensions Act Amended: 1912

Plus 29 acts amended

=== 1912 ===
- Aged and Infirm Persons Protection Act Amended: 1957/69/75
- Akaroa and Wainui Road District, Akaroa County, and Wairewa County Alteration o Act
- Auckland Education Reserves Act
- Barmaids Registration Act
- Country Telephones-lines Act
- Deputy Governor's Powers Act
- Land Agents Act Amended: 1955/56/59/61
- Mokau Harbour Board Empowering Act
- New Plymouth Huatoki Stream Diversion and Exchange Act
- Oamaru King George's Park Reserve Vesting Act
- Plumbers Registration Act Amended: 1950/55
- Public Service Act Amended: 1927/46/50/51/52/54/59/60
- Tatum Trust Revocation Act
- Tauranga Harbour Act Amended: 1917
- Thomas George Macarthy Trust Act Amended: 1972
- Waimairi County Differential Rate Empowering Act
- Wellington and Karori Sanitation and Water-supply Act Amended: 1915
- Westland Hospital and Charitable Aid Board Vesting and Empowering Act
- Whakatane Harbour Act Amended: 1915/16/17/20/22/28/50

Plus 49 acts amended

== See also ==
The above list may not be current and will contain errors and omissions. For more accurate information try:

- Walter Monro Wilson, The Practical Statutes of New Zealand, Auckland: Wayte and Batger 1867
- The Knowledge Basket: Legislation NZ
- New Zealand Legislation Includes some imperial and provincial acts. Only includes acts currently in force, and as amended.
- Legislation Direct List of statutes from 2003 to order
