= List of statutes of New Zealand (1984–1990) =

This is a partial list of statutes of New Zealand for the period of the Fourth Labour Government of New Zealand up to and including part of the first year of the Fourth National Government of New Zealand.

== 1980s ==
=== 1985 ===
- Adult Adoption Information Act Amended: 1991
- Auckland Aotea Centre Empowering Act Amended: 2001
- College House Act
- Fish Royalties Act Amended: 1986
- Goods and Services Tax Act 1985 Amended: 1986/87/88/89/90/91/92/93/94/95/96/2001/05
- Law Commission Act Amended: 2002
- Longley Adoption Act
- Mount Smart Regional Recreation Centre Act
- National Bank of New Zealand Act
- Nelson College Empowering Act
- Parliamentary Service Act Amended: 1988/91
- St Peter's School Trust Board Act Amended: 1997
- Stockman-Howe Marriage Act

Plus 183 acts amended

=== 1986 ===
- Commerce Act 1986
- Constitution Act Amended: 1987/99/2005
- Development Finance Corporation of New Zealand Act Amended: 1987/88
- Environment Act Amended: 1989/96
- Fair Trading Act 1986 Amended: 1990/94/97/99/2000/01/03/06
- Homosexual Law Reform Act
- Mount Albert Licensing Trust Dissolution Act
- New Plymouth Boys' High School Empowering Act
- New Zealand Market Development Board Act
- Residential Tenancies Act Amended: 1992/96
- State-Owned Enterprises Act Amended: 1987/88/89/90/92/94/96/2004
- Survey Act Amended: 1988/89/96
- Union Representatives Education Leave Act Amended: 1991

Plus 111 acts amended and two acts repealed.

=== 1987 ===
- Auckland Airport Act Amended: 1988/96
- Auckland Domain Act
- Conservation Act Amended: 1988/90/93/94/96/98/99/2000/01/03/04/05
- Electricity Operators Act
- Fencing of Swimming Pools Act Amended: 1989/2007
- Labour Relations Act Amended: 1988/89/90
- Local Government Official Information and Meetings Act Amended: 1988/89/91/93/96/2003/04
- Maori Language Act Amended: 1991
- New Zealand Horticulture Export Authority Act Amended: 1990/92/2002/03
- New Zealand Nuclear Free Zone, Disarmament, and Arms Control Act
- Parental Leave and Employment Protection Act Amended: 1991/2004/05
- Plant Variety Rights Act Amended: 1990/94/96/99
- Post Office Bank Act Amended: 1988
- Postal Services Act Amended: 1990/2001
- Shipping Act
- Taupo Borough Council Empowering Act
- Te Runanga o Ngati Porou Act
- Telecommunications Act Amended: 1988/90/94/97/2001/05/06
- Temporary Safeguard Authorities Act Amended: 1994
- Translation into Maori of Maori Language Act
- Victims of Offences Act Amended: 1988/94/99
- Video Recordings Act Amended: 1990
- Waikato Anglican Boys College Trust Act
- Wellington Harbour Board and Wellington City Council Vesting and Empowering Act
- Whakatane District Council Empowering Act
- Wheat Producers Levy Act

Plus 154 acts amended and five acts repealed.

=== 1988 ===
- Access Training Scheme Act
- AMP Perpetual Trustee Company Act
- Clerk of the House of Representatives Act
- Disputes Tribunals Act Amended: 1995/98/99/2002
- Dumping and Countervailing Duties Act Amended: 1990/94/2006
- Dunedin City Council Endowment Lands Act
- External Relations Act
- General Finance Limited Act
- Hauraki Maori Trust Board Act
- Imperial Laws Application Act
- Import Control Act
- Maniapoto Maori Trust Board Act
- Ministry of Works and Development Abolition Act
- New Zealand 1990 Commission Act
- New Zealand Symphony Orchestra Act Amended: 1994
- New Zealand Trade Development Board Act Amended: 1994
- Petroleum Sector Reform Act
- Police Complaints Authority Act Amended: 1988/94
- Port Companies Act Amended: 1990/93
- Protection of Personal and Property Rights Act Amended: 1989/94/97/98/2007
- Rating Powers Act Amended: 1989/91/92/96/99
- Road User Charges Orders Confirmation Act
- State Sector Act Amended: 1989/90/91/92/97/99/2003/04/07
- Taranaki Harbours Board Reclamation and Empowering Act
- Te Runanga o Ngati Awa Act
- Te Runanga o Ngati Whatua Act
- Trustee Banks Restructuring Act Amended: 1989
- Waikato Electricity Authority Act Amended: 1990
- Whanganui River Trust Board Act
- Wool Testing Authority Dissolution Act

Plus 194 acts amended and four acts repealed.

=== 1989 ===
- Abolition of the Death Penalty Act
- Animals Law Reform Act
- Children, Young Persons, and Their Families Act Amended: 1989/94/96/98/2001/04/07
- Crimes of Torture Act Amended: 2006
- Crown Forest Assets Act Amended: 1992/93/95
- Ellen Harriet Eames Estate Act
- Hawke's Bay Harbour Board Empowering Act
- Licensing Fund Act
- Maori Affairs Restructuring Act Amended: 1991/96
- Maori Fisheries Act Amended: 2001/06
- Motor Vehicle Securities Act Amended: 1989/94
- PGG Trust Limited Act
- Phosphate Commission of New Zealand Dissolution Act
- Radiocommunications Act Amended: 1990/94/95/96/2000/02/05/06/07
- Rural Banking and Finance Corporation of New Zealand Act
- School Trustees Act
- Tourist Hotel Corporation of New Zealand Act
- Trade in Endangered Species Act Amended: 1991/96/98/99/2005/07
- Transit New Zealand Act Amended: 1990/91/92/95/97
- Transport Services Licensing Act Amended: 1990/92/95/97
- Waterfront Industry Reform Act
- Waterfront Industry Restructuring Act
- Wheat Industry Research Levies Act

Plus 117 acts amended and three acts repealed.

== 1990s ==
=== 1990 ===
- AE Thorpe Limited Act
- Casino Control Act
- Commodity Levies Act Amended: 1993/95
- Conservation Law Reform Act
- Employment Equity Act
- Foundation for Research, Science, and Technology Act Amended: 1993/2001
- Health Research Council Act Amended: 1991/2003
- Irrigation Schemes Act
- Land Tax Abolition Act
- Local Restoration Polls Act
- Matamata-Piako District Council Empowering Act
- Meteorological Services Act Amended: 1992
- National Provident Fund Restructuring Act Amended: 1991/92/97
- New Zealand Bill of Rights Act
- New Zealand Railways Corporation Restructuring Act Amended: 1993
- Ozone Layer Protection Act Amended: 1993/94
- Runanga Iwi Act
- Serious Fraud Office Act
- Smoke-free Environments Act Amended: 1990/91/93/95/97/2003
- Term Poll Act
- Tower Corporation Act Amended: 1989/95
- Transport Accident Investigation Commission Act Amended: 1992/96/98/99
- Wellington Airport Act Amended: 1996

Plus 101 acts amended and three acts repealed.

== See also ==
The above list may not be current and will contain errors and omissions. For more accurate information try:

- Walter Monro Wilson, The Practical Statutes of New Zealand, Auckland: Wayte and Batger 1867
- The Knowledge Basket: Legislation NZ
- New Zealand Legislation Includes some imperial and provincial acts. Only includes acts currently in force, and as amended.
- Legislation Direct List of statutes from 2003 to order
