= Lists of acts of the New Zealand Parliament =

This article gives lists of New Zealand acts of Parliament (statutory law) sorted by government and parliamentary term.

== Chronological list of governments of New Zealand ==
Number	Government	Statutes	Time in office
0		List of acts of the New Zealand Parliament (1840–1890)	
1	Liberal	List of acts of the New Zealand Parliament (1891–1912)	21 years
2	Reform	List of acts of the New Zealand Parliament (1912–1928)	16 years
3	United	List of statutes of New Zealand (1928–1931)	3 years
4	United–Reform coalition	List of statutes of New Zealand (1931–1935)	4 years
5	First Labour	List of statutes of New Zealand (1935–1949)	14 years
6	First National	List of statutes of New Zealand (1949–1957)	8 years
7	Second Labour	List of statutes of New Zealand (1957–1960)	3 years
8	Second National	List of statutes of New Zealand (1960–1972)	12 years
9	Third Labour	List of statutes of New Zealand (1972–1975)	3 years
10	Third National	List of statutes of New Zealand (1975–1984)	8 years
11	Fourth Labour	List of statutes of New Zealand (1984–1990)	6 years
12	Fourth National	List of statutes of New Zealand (1990–1999)	9 years
13	Fifth Labour	List of statutes of New Zealand (1999–2008)	9 years
14	Fifth National	List of statutes of New Zealand (2008–2017)	9 years
15	Sixth Labour	List of statutes of New Zealand (2017–2023)	6 years
16	Sixth National	List of statutes of New Zealand (2023–present)	

== Chronological lists of acts of each New Zealand Parliament ==
Parliament	Government	Acts
52nd Parliament	Sixth Labour	List of acts of the 52nd New Zealand Parliament
53rd Parliament	Sixth Labour	List of acts of the 53rd New Zealand Parliament
54th Parliament	Sixth National	List of acts of the 54th New Zealand Parliament
