= List of statutes of New Zealand (1928–1931) =

This is a partial list of statutes of New Zealand for the period of the United Government of New Zealand up to and including part of the first year of the Liberal–Reform coalition Government of New Zealand.

== 1920s ==
=== 1929 ===
- Associated Churches of Christ Church Property Act
- Auckland City Sinking Funds and Empowering Act
- Bluff Harbour Reclamation and Leasing and Empowering Act
- Christchurch City Electricity and General Empowering Act
- Hawke's Bay County, Hastings Borough and Havelock, North Town Board Empowering Act
- Lyttelton Harbour Board Reclamation Validation Act
- Pacific Cable Sale Authorization Act
- Rest-homes Act
- Sumner Borough Land Vesting Act
- Taupiri Drainage and River District Act Amended: 1931/37/43
- Transport Department Act

Plus 26 acts amended

== 1930s ==
=== 1930 ===
- Auckland City Council and Motuihi Island Domain Board Empowering Act
- Canterbury Agricultural College Act Amended: 1934/49/54/58
- Census Postponement Act
- Disabled Soldiers' Civil Re-establishment Act
- Electric-power Boards and Supply Authorities Association Act
- Hawke's Bay County Empowering Act
- Invercargill City Fire and Accident Insurance Fund Empowering Act Amended: 1952
- Kawarau Gold Mining Amalgamation Act
- Kirkpatrick Masonic Institute Empowering Act Amended: 1983
- National Art Gallery and Dominion Museum Act Amended: 1933/36/56/58/67
- Patea Borough Council Empowering Act
- Rotorua Borough Empowering Act
- Unemployment Act Amended: 1931/32/34
- Waiapu County Council Empowering Act

Plus 32 acts amended

=== 1931 ===
- Air Navigation Act
- Auckland Harbour Board and other Local Bodies Empowering Act
- Auckland Harbour Bridge Empowering Act
- Broadcasting Act Amended: 1934/37/59/60/77/79/81/82/85/88/89/90/91/93/96/98/99/2000/01/03/04/07
- Dominion Life Assurance Office of New Zealand, Limited Act
- Hawke's Bay Earthquake Act Amended: 1962
- Hawke's Bay Earthquake Relief Funds Act
- Licensing Poll Postponement Act
- Mortgagors Relief Act Amended: 1931
- Mountain Guides Act
- Native Purposes Act
- New Lynn Sewerage Validation Act
- Rent Restriction Extension Act
- Rotorua Borough Reclamation Empowering Act
- South Wairarapa River Board Empowering Act
- Trading-coupons Act
- Transport Licensing Act Amended: 1935/36/49

Plus 23 acts amended

== See also ==
The above list may not be current and will contain errors and omissions. For more accurate information try:

- Walter Monro Wilson, The Practical Statutes of New Zealand, Auckland: Wayte and Batger 1867
- The Knowledge Basket: Legislation NZ
- New Zealand Legislation Includes some imperial and provincial acts. Only includes acts currently in force, and as amended.
- Legislation Direct List of statutes from 2003 to order
