= List of statutes of New Zealand (1949–1957) =

This is a partial list of statutes of New Zealand for the period of the First National Government of New Zealand up to and including part of the first year of the Second Labour Government of New Zealand.

== 1950s ==
=== 1950 ===
- Auckland Harbour Trust Act
- Balclutha Borough Vesting and Empowering Act
- Boilers, Lifts, and Cranes Act Amended: 1966/69/71/80/88
- Capital Punishment Act
- Co-operative Egg Marketing Companies Act
- Crown Proceedings Act Amended: 1958/62/69/74/82/88
- Dietitians Act Amended: 1955/64/65/70/73/79/82/94/99/2001
- Emergency Forces Act Amended: 1951
- Huntly Borough Empowering Act
- Hutt Valley Electric Board Empowering Act
- Joint Family Homes Act Amended: 1951/52/55/57/59/60/65/68/71/72/74
- Legislative Council Abolition Act
- Limitation Act Amended: 1962/63/70/96
- Machinery Act Amended: 1956/61/63/65/68/69/70/71/72/74/76/77/78/79/81/86/89
- Marginal Lands Act Amended: 1958/62/65/69/70/77
- Medical Research Council Act Amended: 1951/56/65/81/86/87
- Napier City Special Rates Consolidation Act
- Nelson City Special Rates Consolidation Act
- New Zealand Army Act Amended: 1954/57/59/60/61/62/63/65/67/69/76/81
- Palmerston North City Gasworks and Electricity Empowering Act
- Potato Growing Industry Act Amended: 1955/60/62/70
- Republic of India Act
- Republic of Ireland Act
- Royal New Zealand Air Force Act Amended: 1954/57/59/60/61/62/63/65/67/68/76/80/81
- Servicemen's Settlement Act Amended: 1951
- Taupiri and Renown Coal Companies Act
- Waterfront Royal Commission Act
- Wool Proceeds Retention Act Amended: 1951/64

Plus 61 acts amended

=== 1951 ===
- Air Services Licensing Act Amended: 1952/55/58/60/65/67/72/73/74/78/86
- Eliza White Orphanage Trust Act
- Enemy Property Act
- Fees and Travelling Allowances Act Amended: 1987
- John Fuller Trust Act
- Lower Hutt City Empowering Act
- Lyttelton Borough Gasworks and Electricity Empowering Act
- Lyttelton Harbour Board Empowering Act
- North Shore Drainage Act Amended: 1954/56/66/67/68/69/71/83
- Oamaru Borough Council and Oamaru Harbour Board Empowering Act
- Oamaru Harbour Board Rating Act
- Official Secrets Act
- Palmerston North Town Planning Empowering Act
- Peggy Joan Boys Voluntary Settlement Act
- Roman Catholic Bishops Empowering Act Amended: 1970
- Te Kuiti Borough Empowering Act
- Union Funds Distribution Act Amended: 1965
- Wool Commission Act Amended: 1952/54/61/64/67/68

Plus 70 acts amended

=== 1952 ===
- Amusement Tax Act Amended: 1953/56/63
- Auckland Trades Hall Trust Act
- Bay of Islands Harbour Board Empowering Act Amended: 1953
- Bluff Borough Council and Bluff Harbour Board Empowering Act
- Bluff Harbour Improvement Act
- City of Dunedin Leasing Empowering Act
- Diplomatic Immunities Act
- Electricians Act Amended: 1956/59/60/63/66/67/69/75/76
- Geothermal Steam Act
- Greymouth Borough Special Rates Consolidation Act
- Hamilton City Gasworks and Electricity Empowering Act
- Hutt Valley and Bays Metropolitan Milk Board Validation Act
- Inland Revenue Department Act Amended: 1958/60/61/66/76/78/79/80/86/88/89/90/91/92/93/94
- Land Settlement Promotion Act Amended: 1955/59/61/63
- Lyttelton Harbour Board Loan and Empowering Act
- Manawatu Catchment Board Empowering Act
- National Parks Act Amended: 1955/56/58/64/65/67/68/70/71/72/73/74/76/77/82/88/94/96/2001/05
- New Lynn Borough Empowering and Rates Consolidation Act
- New Plymouth City Empowering Act
- Social Service Council of the Diocese of Christchurch Act
- Summary Jurisdiction Act Amended: 1955
- Tauranga County Council Empowering Act
- Timaru City Rates Consolidation Act
- Wellington Harbour Board Loan and Empowering Act
- Western Waiheke Road Board Empowering Act
- Whanganui College Board of Trustees Empowering Act

Plus 59 acts amended

=== 1953 ===
- Auckland Hospital Board Trusts Empowering Act
- Building Emergency Regulations Act Amended: 1954/55/56
- Courts-Martial Appeals Act
- Dairy Board Act Amended: 1955/57/58/67/69/71/72/73/75/77/79/80/85/86/88/92/96/98
- Department of Agriculture Act Amended: 1962/64
- Designs Act Amended: 1972/76/96/99
- Emergency Forces Rehabilitation Act Amended: 1971
- Geothermal Energy Act Amended: 1957/66/69/73/77/80/88
- Kaikoura River Board Validating Act
- Kamo Town Board Empowering Act
- Kawerau and Murupara Townships Act
- King George the Fifth Memorial Children's Health Camps Act Amended: 1960
- Local Authorities' Emergency Powers Act
- Local Elections And Polls Act
- Maori Affairs Act Amended: 1962/67/74/85/87/88/91
- Maori Trust Leases Renewal Act
- Maori Trustee Act Amended: 1962/79/85/91/96
- Motor Spirits Distribution Act Amended: 1958/63/66/68/72/75/79/81
- National Roads Act Amended: 1954/55/56/57/58/59/60/62/64/65/70/73/80/88
- New Zealand Government Property Corporation Act Amended: 1967
- Offences at Sea Act
- Orchard Levy Act Amended: 1969/72/76/82/85/87/88
- Patents Act 1953 Rescinded and replaced 2013/2017
- Primary Products Marketing Regulations Confirmation Act
- Reserves and Domains Act Amended: 1955/56/57/58/60/63/64/65/66/67/68/69/70/71/72
- Royal New Zealand Institute of Horticulture Act Amended: 1957/85
- Royal Powers Act
- Selwyn Plantation Board Act Amended: 1963/77/91
- Southland Catchment Board Empowering Act
- Town and Country Planning Act Amended: 1957/61/63/66/68/69/71/72/73/74/75/80/83/87/88
- Underground Water Act
- Waterfront Industry Act Amended: 1958/64/77/80/82/83/84/85
- Waters Pollution Act Amended: 1962/70
- Wildlife Act Amended: 1956/59/64/66/68/71/72/73/80/81/83/93/94/96/2003

Plus 86 acts amended

=== 1954 ===
- Criminal Justice Act Amended: 1955/60/61/62/63/65/66/67/69/70/75/76/78/80/81/83/85/86/87/88/89/93/94/95/96/97/98/99/2001
- Dargaville Borough Empowering Act
- Defamation Act Amended: 1958/71/74
- Historic Places Act Amended: 1957/63/64/67/69/70/72/75/76/82/85/88/93/98/2006
- Kaitaia Borough Empowering Act
- Maori Vested Lands Administration Act
- McKenzie Trusts Act
- Merchandise Marks Act
- Navy Act Amended: 1958/62/67/76
- Offenders Legal Aid Act Amended: 1989
- Onerahi Town Board Empowering Act
- Papatoetoe Borough Special Rates Consolidation Act
- Patea By-election Act
- Penal Institutions Act Amended: 1955/61/63/64/65/69/75/76/78/79/80/81/82/83/85/89/91/93/94/96/97/99
- Raglan Harbour Board Empowering Act
- Taranaki Harbour Board Act
- Tasman Pulp and Paper Company Enabling Act Amended: 1986
- Taupo County Act Amended: 1965

Plus 52 acts amended

=== 1955 ===
- Adoption Act Amended: 1957/62/65/87/95/2000
- Ashburton Borough Cemetery Act
- Chiropractors' Association Act
- Co-operative Fertilizer Manufacturing Companies Act
- Dogs Registration Act Amended: 1937/61/62/65/68/69/73/76/77
- Eden Park Trust Act Amended: 1970/79
- Electricity and Gas Co-ordination Committee Act
- Estate and Gift Duties Act Amended: 1957/58/59/60/61/62/63/64/65/66/68/69/70/71/72/74/76/77/78/79/80/81/82/83/86/87/89/90/92/93/94/95/96/2005
- Family Protection Act Amended: 1921/59/67/91/2001
- Hamilton City Special Rates Consolidation Act
- Hikurangi Town Council Empowering Act
- Maori Reserved Land Act Amended: 1997/98
- Maori Trust Boards Act Amended: 1962/83/88/96
- Marriage Act 1955
- Mary Bryant Trust Board Enabling Act
- Meat Export Prices Act Amended: 1957/73/82
- Mutual Insurance Act Amended: 1963/64/68/71/77/78/82/86
- New Zealand Foundation for the Blind Act Amended: 1959
- Newspapers and Printers Act
- Otago Museum Trust Board Act Amended: 1968/73/78
- Palmerston North Insurance Funds Act
- Rabbits Act Amended: 1956/58/59/60/62/63/64
- Rawene Town Council Empowering Act
- Statistics Act Amended: 1978/82/85/86/88/94
- Taranaki Harbour Board Empowering Act Amended: 1956/57
- Tourist Hotel Corporation Act Amended: 1961/68/71/73/76/78/82/85
- Wellington Harbour Reclamation Act Amended: 1969/83/86

Plus 77 acts amended

=== 1956 ===
- Awanui Harbour Board Empowering Act
- Boy Scouts Association of New Zealand Act
- Co-operative Companies Act Amended: 1976/77/98/2004
- Contracts Enforcement Act
- Electricity and Gas Co-ordination Act
- Greytown Trust Lands Act
- Industries and Commerce Act Amended: 1969
- Local Authorities Loans Act Amended: 1959/61/63/67/68/71/72/76/82/86/88/89/91
- Masonic Property Trusts Act
- Northcote Borough Empowering Act
- Noxious Animals Act Amended: 1962/67
- Republic of Pakistan Act
- Saint Mary's Guild Trust Act
- Tauranga Harbour Board Loan and Empowering Act
- Waikato Valley Authority Act Amended: 1960/61/68/69/77
- Waitemata County Council Empowering Act

Plus 80 acts amended

=== 1957 ===
- Archives Act Amended: 1988
- Charitable Trusts Act Amended: 1963/93/2007
- Church of Jesus Christ of Latter-day Saints Trust Board Empowering Act Amended: 1968
- Diplomatic Immunities and Privileges Act
- Federation of Malaya Act
- Hastings City Special Rates Consolidation Act
- Hospitals Act Amended: 1948/50/51/53/56/61/62/64/66/67/68/70/71/72/73/75/76/77/78/80/81/82/83/86/88/89/93/96
- Income Tax Assessment Act
- Maori Soldiers Trust Act Amended: 2001
- Oaths and Declarations Act Amended: 1963/65/72/96/98/99/2001/02
- Presbyterian Church Property Trustees Empowering Act
- Rangiora Borough Empowering Act
- Taranaki Scholarships Trust Board Act Amended: 1961/62/66/69/80/82/87/93
- Valuation Equalisation Act
- Vegetables Levy Act Amended: 1960/72/75/78/80/81
- Whangarei Borough Special Rates Consolidation Act

Plus 86 acts amended

== See also ==
The above list may not be current and will contain errors and omissions. For more accurate information try:

- Walter Monro Wilson, The Practical Statutes of New Zealand, Auckland: Wayte and Batger 1867
- The Knowledge Basket: Legislation NZ
- New Zealand Legislation Includes some imperial and provincial acts. Only includes acts currently in force, and as amended.
- Legislation Direct List of statutes from 2003 to order
