= List of statutes of New Zealand (1999–2008) =

This is a partial list of statutes of New Zealand for the period of the Fifth Labour Government of New Zealand up to and including part of the first year of the Fifth National Government of New Zealand.

== 2000s ==
=== 2000 ===
- Archives, Culture, and Heritage Reform Act
- Bail Act Amended: 2002/03/07
- Employment Relations Act Amended: 2004/06/07
- Energy Efficiency and Conservation Act
- Hauraki Gulf Marine Park Act Amended: 2001
- Industry New Zealand Act
- International Crimes and International Criminal Court Act Amended: 2002
- Ministry of Economic Development Act
- Modern Apprenticeship Training Act
- Museum of Transport and Technology Act
- New Zealand - Singapore Closer Economic Partnership Act
- New Zealand Public Health and Disability Act Amended: 2003/05
- Nurse Maude Association Act
- Pardon for Soldiers of the Great War Act
- Pouakani Claims Settlement Act
- Protected Disclosures Act
- The Statutes of New Zealand Local Act No 1
- The Statutes of New Zealand Private Acts Nos 1-2

Plus 75 acts amended and one act repealed.

=== 2001 ===
- Dairy Industry Restructuring Act 2001
- Education Standards Act
- Habeas Corpus Act
- Injury Prevention, Rehabilitation, and Compensation Act Amended: 2003/05/07
- Local Electoral Act Amended: 2002/04/06
- New Zealand Superannuation Act 2001 Amended heaps
- Public Audit Act
- Public Trust Act
- Sydenham Money Club Act
- Taranaki Regional Council Empowering Act
- The Statutes of New Zealand Local Acts Nos 1-6
- Tutae-Ka-Wetoweto Forest Act

Plus 55 acts amended and one act repealed.

=== 2002 ===
As Enacted

- Cadastral Survey Act Amended: 2005
- Chartered Professional Engineers of New Zealand Act
- Civil Defence Emergency Management Act
- Climate Change Response Act Amended: 2006
- Construction Contracts Act Amended: 2003
- Crown Organisations (Criminal Liability) Act 2002
- Electronic Transactions Act
- Hawke's Bay Endowment Land Empowering Act
- New Zealand Stock Exchange Restructuring Act
- Parole Act Amended: 2006/07
- Pitcairn Trials Act
- Royal New Zealand Foundation of the Blind Act
- Sentencing Act Amended: 2003/04/06/07
- Sport and Recreation New Zealand Act
- Te Uri o Hau Claims Settlement Act
- Terrorism Suppression Act Amended: 2003/05/07
- Tower Trust Limited Act
- Victims' Rights Act
- Weathertight Homes Resolution Services Act

Plus 43 acts amended

=== 2003 ===
- Auckland War Memorial Museum Site Empowering Act
- Children's Commissioner Act
- Credit Contracts and Consumer Finance Act
- Families Commission Act
- Gambling Act Amended: 2005
- Government Communications Security Bureau Act
- Health Practitioners Competence Assurance Act
- Hop Industry Restructuring Act
- Land Transport Management Act Amended: 2004
- Motor Vehicle Sales Act Amended: 2005
- New Zealand Trade and Enterprise Act
- Ngati Ruanui Claims Settlement Act
- Ngati Tama Claims Settlement Act
- Prostitution Reform Act
- Retirement Villages Act Amended: 2005/07
- Social Workers Registration Act
- Te Whanau-a-Taupara Trust Empowering Act
- Television New Zealand Act
- Wine Act 2003 Amended: 2005
- Wool Industry Restructuring Act

Plus 82 acts amended and two acts repealed.

=== 2004 ===
- Care of Children Act Amended: 2005/07
- Civil Union Act Amended: 2007
- Corrections Act Amended: 2005
- Crown Entities Act
- Foreshore and Seabed Act
- Human Assisted Reproductive Technology Act Amended: 2007
- Judicial Conduct Commissioner and Judicial Conduct Panel Act
- Maori Commercial Aquaculture Claims Settlement Act Amended: 2006
- Maritime Security Act
- Secondhand Dealers and Pawnbrokers Act
- The Statutes of New Zealand Local Acts Nos 1-2

Plus 77 acts amended

=== 2005 ===
- Charities Act
- Ngaa Rauru Kiitahi Claims Settlement Act
- Ngati Awa Claims Settlement Act
- Prisoners' and Victims' Claims Act Amended: 2007
- Public Records Act
- Registered Architects Act

Plus 100 acts amended

=== 2006 ===
- Evidence Act 2006
- Epidemic Preparedness Act
- KiwiSaver Act
- Lawyers and Conveyancers Act Amended: 2007
- Manfeild Park Act
- New Zealand Sign Language Act 2006
- Ngati Mutunga Claims Settlement Act
- Rotorua Library Trust Fund Variation Act
- Southland Agricultural and Pastoral Association Empowering Act
- Sports Anti-Doping Act
- Te Arawa Lakes Settlement Act
- Westpac New Zealand Act

Plus 67 acts amended

=== 2007 ===
- Court Martial Act
- Electoral Finance Act
- Immigration Advisers Licensing Act
- Major Events Management Act
- Sentencing Council Act
- Unsolicited Electronic Messages Act
- Wills Act 2007 Amended: 1955/58/60/62/69/77/2005

=== 2008 ===
- Affiliate Te Arawa Iwi and Hapu Claims Settlement Act 2008
- Affordable Housing: Enabling Territorial Authorities Act 2008
- Appropriation (2008/09 Estimates) Act 2008
- Auckland Regional Amenities Funding Act 2008
- Bishop Suter Art Gallery Governance Restructuring Act 2008
- Central North Island Forests Land Collective Settlement Act 2008
- Christchurch City Council (Lancaster Park) Land Vesting Act 2008
- Criminal Disclosure Act 2008
- Disability (United Nations Convention on the Rights of Persons with Disabilities) Act 2008
- Financial Advisers Act 2008
- Financial Service Providers (Registration and Dispute Resolution) Act 2008
- Human Tissue Act 2008
- Imprest Supply (Second for 2008/09) Act 2008
- Land Transport Management Amendment Act 2008
- Limited Partnerships Act 2008
- Mauao Historic Reserve Vesting Act 2008
- New Zealand Geographic Board (Ngā Pou Taunaha o Aotearoa) Act 2008
- Policing Act 2008
- Public Lending Right for New Zealand Authors Act 2008
- Public Transport Management Act 2008
- Real Estate Agents Act 2008
- Subordinate Legislation (Confirmation and Validation) Act 2008
- Taxation (Limited Partnerships) Act 2008
- Te Roroa Claims Settlement Act 2008
- Waitakere Ranges Heritage Area Act 2008
- Waste Minimisation Act 2008
