= Administration Act 1969 =

Act of Parliament in New Zealand

New Zealand Parliament
- Long title: An Act to consolidate and amend certain enactments relating to the administration of the estates of deceased persons
- Status: Current legislation

The Administration Act 1969 is an Act of Parliament passed in New Zealand in 1969 that regulates the administration of wills and trusts. As of 2022, it was a principal statute concerning the law of succession in New Zealand. It has been amended to include domestic partners.
