= Frustrated Contracts Act 1944 =

Act of Parliament in New Zealand

Frustrated Contracts Act

New Zealand Parliament
- Royal assent: 5 December 1944
- Status: Repealed

The Frustrated Contracts Act was an Act of Parliament passed in New Zealand in 1944. The Act codified into law the treatment of frustrated contracts, and replaced the previous common law remedies for frustration.

It was repealed by the Contract and Commercial Law Act 2017.
