= SafetyLine Lone Worker =

Software company in Canada

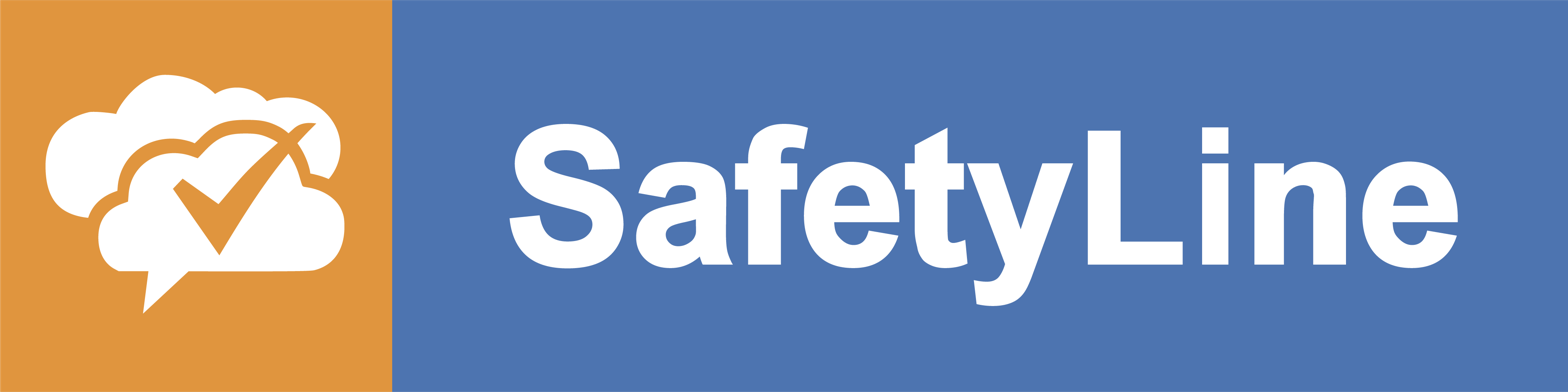
- Industry: Lone worker monitoring
- Headquarters: 201 - 1523 East Pender St., Vancouver, BC, V5L 1V9
- Website: safetylineloneworker.com
- Key People: Gabriel Caldwell(CEO); Kyle Touhey(CPO); Heather Eastman(CDO)
- Area Served: Canada; United States of America; Central and South America; South Africa; Australia; United Kingdom
- Registration: Trial, Starter, Team, Complete, Enterprise
- Founder: Thomas Touhey
- Launched: 1999
- Available in: Multilingual
- Current status: active

SafetyLine Lone Worker is an automated cloud-based Lone worker monitoring service that helps companies with remote or isolated workers comply with the Canadian Center for Occupational Health and Safety lone worker regulations. SafetyLine provides an interactive voice response (IVR) service, a smartphone application, a web application, satellite device integrations, and Bluetooth hardware integrations. SafetyLine was the first automated solution that used cloud-based technology and mobile data in a lone worker solution in Canada, along with a website delivering regularly updated safety-related content.

The GEOS International Emergency Response Coordination Center (IERCC), monitors SafetyLine Lone Worker's satellite and supported smartphone devices.

SafetyLine Lone Worker is a subsidiary of Tsunami Solutions with its main office in Vancouver, British Columbia, Canada.

== History ==
SafetyLine Lone Worker was founded in 1999 by Thomas Touhey. Initially, SafetyLine's mobile monitoring service software primarily supported wireless applications protocol (WAP) devices. Lack of users having WAP supported devices lead SafetyLine to switch to an IVR monitoring service, where a user could make a phone call to access SafetyLine commands.

- In 2002, SafetyLine Lone Worker was resold through Levitt-Safety on a monthly subscription basis per user.
- In 2005, SafetyLine Lone Worker had over 100 companies using its service.
- In May 2005, SafetyLine was awarded a Corporate Supply Arrangement to supply all 19 ministries of the Province of British Columbia with Employee Notification and Safety Monitoring Services.
- In 2006, 3M Canada incorporated SafetyLine into their employee safety protection plan.
- In September 2009, SafetyLine introduced a video panic system, allowing video monitoring of emergencies with the use of a panic button.
- In December 2011, the Canadian Corps of Commissionaires of Victoria announced that SafetyLine Lone Worker would be offered to clients working or traveling alone.
- In 2017, SafetyLine introduced the use of motion detection, allowing a user to create an emergency alert by shaking the smartphone device or by having the smartphone device detect no motion or a falling motion by using the smartphones accelerometer data.

== Lone Worker Monitoring System ==
SafetyLine is a software as a service(SaaS) tool intended for lone worker monitoring. A worker will log on to the SafetyLine system at the start of their shift, checking in regularly throughout the day until their shift is done. Any deviations are flagged by the SafetyLine system and bringing attention to administrators immediately providing any reporting information given by the worker and/or the Safety device. The user can 'check-in' their safety status using a smartphone application, an IVR, and a Satellite Emergency Notification Device.

== Awards ==
- 2016 Canadian Occupational Health and Safety Reader's Choice award.
- 2017 Canadian Occupational Health and Safety Reader's Choice award.

== See also ==
- Lone worker
- Lone worker monitoring
- Occupational safety and health
- List of legislation named for a person
- Grant's Law
- Occupational Health and Safety Regulations of British Columbia
