= Grant's Law =

2007 law in British Columbia, Canada

- Long title: Changes to Workers Compensation Act, Occupational Health and Safety Regulation
- Citation: Occupational Health and Safety Regulation 4.22.1-4.22.2
- Territorial extent: British Columbia
- Passed: 4 October 2007
- Enacted: July 2007
- Commenced: 1 February 2008
- Introduced by: Olga Ilich MLA, Minister of Labour

Amends
- 15 April 2012
- Status: In force

Grant's Law is a resolution that was passed on October 4, 2007, and took effect on February 1, 2008. It required heightened safety measures for gas station and store employees working alone. It was first tabled in 2006 by the Minister of Labour Olga IIich of the British Columbia Legislature.

It established British Columbia as the first province in Canada where drivers have to pay before they pump gas and must include provisions to add barriers between customers. An employee working between 11 p.m. and 6 a.m. must be accompanied by another employee between said time. The law introduced the pre-payment system combined with new training and education services for gas station workers.

The Law was named for Grant De Patie, a gas station worker who was killed in 2005 by an underage drunken driver.

== Background ==
On March 8, 2005, Grant De Patie, a 24-year-old gas station attendant who worked at an Esso at the intersection of Dewdney Trunk Road and 248th Street in Maple Ridge, British Columbia, was dragged for seven and a half kilometers under a stolen Chrysler LeBaron driven by 16-year-old Darnell Pratt. Grant was writing down the license plate number as Darnell ran over him while stealing $12.30 worth of gasoline. Grant was dragged 7.5 kilometers before his body was dislodged from the white Chrysler LeBaron. Darnell Pratt was charged with manslaughter and sentenced to 12 years, but was released in 2012 on parole. Pratt died from an undisclosed cause on Feb 13, 2019.

== Legal effects ==
Grant's law consists of amendments to the Workers Compensation Act, Occupational Health and Safety Regulation, Section 4.22.1 & 4.22.2.

- 4.22.1 Requires employers train new and young employees in safety precautions. It was required that two employees be present between an 11 p.m. to 6 a.m. shift or that a barrier between an employee and a customer be placed.
  - An amendment was made in 2012 allowing employers instead of having two employees working between 11 pm and 6 am, that timed-locks safes and video surveillance be required.
- 4.22.2 Drivers must pay before they use a gas pump. All urban gas stations are required to have a pre-payment system in place to prevent gas-and-dash crimes.

== See also ==
- Lone worker
- Lone worker monitoring
- Occupational safety and health
- List of legislation named for a person
