= List of legislation named for a person =

This is a list of legislation named for a person, usually either the member of Parliament/Congress responsible who proposed it or the victim of events which prompted introduction of the legislation (such as a person whose death might have been prevented had the law existed earlier). These names are generally "popular names" for the legislation, in addition to its formal name. Some of these Acts acquired their names because short titles were not used, and some now have different short titles. Popular names are generally informal (such as Megan's Law) but may reflect the official short title of the legislation. The terms named laws, nominative laws, apostrophe laws, eponymous legislation and namesake laws have been used to describe these pieces of legislation. Concern has been raised that the growth of such named laws in the UK in the 21st century may lead to "an unbalanced hierarchy of offences". A 2016 paper suggested that U.S. laws are disproportionately more often named after white victims than black.

== Roman law ==
- Lex Canuleia
- Lex Ogulnia
- Lex Papia Poppaea
- Lex Trebonia
- Lex Voconia

== Argentina ==
- Yolanda's Law

== Brazil ==
- Afonso Arinos Law
- Aldir Blanc Law
- Carolina Dieckmann Law
- Eusébio de Queirós Law
- Falcão Law
- Feijó Law
- Kandir Law
- Maria da Penha Law
- Mariana Ferrer Law
- Pelé Law
- Rouanet Law
- Ruth Brilhante Law
- Saraiva Law

== Canada ==
- Jordan's Principle
- Justice for Victims of Corrupt Foreign Officials Act (Sergei Magnitsky Law)

== India ==
- Mahatma Gandhi National Rural Employment Guarantee Act, 2005

== Pakistan ==
- Zainab Alert, Response and Recovery Act, 2019

== Russia ==
- Dima Yakovlev Law

== United Kingdom and predecessor states ==
- Alan Turing law (Part 9 Chapter 1 of the Policing and Crime Act 2017)
- Awaab's Law
- Benedict's Law
- Bovill's Act (the Partnership Amendment Act 1865)
- Clare's Law
- The Coventry Act
- Crewe's Act
- Dáithí's Law
- Deasy's Act
- Denman's Act
- Fox's Act
- Handel's Naturalisation Act 1727
- Harper's Law
- Jervis's Act
- Lord Birkenhead's Acts (F. E. Smith, 1st Earl of Birkenhead)
- Lord Brougham's Act
- Lord Cairns' Act
- Lord Campbell's Act:
  - The Libel Act 1843 (6 & 7 Vict. c.96)
  - The Fatal Accidents Act 1846 (9 & 10 Vict. c.93)
  - The Obscene Publications Act 1857
- Lord Cranworth's Act (23 & 24 Vict c 145) (1860) (Robert Rolfe, 1st Baron Cranworth)
- Lord Ellenborough's Act
- Lord Hardwicke's Act
- Lord Kingsdown's Act (the Wills Act 1861) (Thomas Pemberton Leigh, 1st Baron Kingsdown)
- Lord Tenterden's Act
- Lucy's Law
- Malins' Act (the Married Women's Reversionary Interests Act 1857 (20 & 21 Vict c 57)) (Sir Richard Malins)
- Martyn's Law (Terrorism (Protection of Premises) Act 2025)
- Palmer's Act
- Peel's Acts
- Poynings' Law (disambiguation)
- Preston's Act (55 Geo 3 c 192) (1815)
- Sarah's Law (officially the Child Sex Offender Disclosure Scheme)
- Sophia Naturalization Act 1705
- Strode's Act
- The Thellusson Act
- Zach's Law (section 183 of Online Safety Act 2023)

== United States ==
- The Adam Walsh Child Protection and Safety Act
- Amy, Vicky, and Andy Child Pornography Victim Assistance Act of 2018
- Andre's Law
- Bill Emerson Good Samaritan Act of 1996
- The Bland–Allison Act
- The Brady Handgun Violence Prevention Act
- Brett's Law
- Caylee's Law
- The Comstock Law
- The Copyright Term Extension Act, sometimes called the Sonny Bono Act
- The Coogan Act
- Emily's Law
- Emmett Till Antilynching Act
- The Hatch Act of 1939
- Jarod's Law
- Jennifer's Law (disambiguation)
- Jessica's Law
- Jonathan's Law
- Kendra's Law
- Lavinia Masters Act
- Leandra's Law
- The Magnitsky Act
- The Mann Act
- The Matthew Shepard Act
- Marsy’s Law
- Megan's Law
- Muhammad Ali Boxing Reform Act
- The Music Modernization Act, sometimes called the Orrin G. Hatch–Bob Goodlatte Music Modernization Act
- The Nelson Act
- Pamela's Law
- Reagan Tokes Act
- The Ryan White CARE Act
- Sami’s Law
- The Sherman Antitrust Act
- The Volstead Act
- The Zacky Bill
- The Wetterling Act
- The Pure Food and Drug Act, sometimes called the Wiley Act or Dr. Wiley's Law

== See also ==
- List of short titles
- List of legislation named for a place
