= Named laws =

Named laws may refer to:

- List of legislation named for a person
- List of legislation named for a place
- List of eponymous laws, excluding legislation
- List of scientific laws named after people

== See also ==
- List of laws
