= Crescimbeni =

Crescimbeni is an Italian surname. Notable people with the surname include:

- Camila Crescimbeni (born 1990), Argentine politician
- Emmanuel Crescimbeni (born 1990), American-born Peruvian swimmer
- Giovanni Mario Crescimbeni (1663–1728), Italian critic and poet
