= Yolanda Ortíz =

Yolanda Ortíz may refer to:

- Yolanda Ortíz (diver)
- Yolanda Ortiz (chemist)
