= Trio Mobil =

US technology company

- Type: Private
- Industry: Industrial IoT, AI, workplace safety technology
- Founded: 2011
- Founder: Nevzat Ataklı, Celal Barış Özdemir
- Headquarters: Marietta, United States
- Key people: Nevzat Ataklı (CEO), Celal Barış Özdemir (CTO)
- Number of employees: 250+
- Website: www.triomobil.com/en

Trio Mobil is a US-based technology company that develops artificial intelligence and Internet of Things (IoT)-based systems for improving workplace safety and operational efficiency in industrial environments. Founded in 2011, the company is headquartered in Marietta, Georgia, United States, and operates in 65 countries.

== History ==
Trio Mobil was established in 2011 by Nevzat Ataklı and Celal Barış Özdemir. The company initially focused on driving a telematics platform.

In 2017, Trio Mobil completed its first investment round and expanded into the industrial IoT sector. The following year, it launched its first digital industrial IoT platform.

In 2019, Trio Mobil introduced Trio Safe, a location-based safety system developed to help reduce forklift-related accidents in industrial settings. By 2020, the company had expanded into 12 countries. In 2021, it introduced TRUE-AI, an AI-supported real-time video analytics camera, following an investment from venture capital firm 212.

By 2023, the company's customer base had expanded to include multinational corporations such as Coca-Cola, PepsiCo, Nestlé, Unilever, Ford Motor Company, and Mercedes-Benz. That year, Gartner recognized Trio Mobil's forklift safety technology among its "Top Strategic Technology Trends" and included the company as a "Visionary" in the Gartner Magic Quadrant.

In July 2024, Trio Mobil secured $26.5 million in growth financing led by NewSpring Growth, with participation from 212 VC and TIBAS Ventures.

== Operations ==
Trio Mobil provides workplace safety and operational efficiency technologies based on AI and IoT. Its services include forklift safety and collision avoidance systems, forklift fleet management, AI vision insights, loading dock safety systems, lone worker safety systems, real-time location systems (RTLS) and AI-supported vehicle telematics. Products include Trio Safe AI, a forklift and pedestrian safety system using AI and ultra-wideband location detection; TrueAI, a real-time video analytics platform for identifying safety risks in workplaces; and FleetBridge, a platform for managing data from IoT and AI systems related to vehicle usage and safety compliance. Additional offerings include loading dock safety systems, lone worker monitoring, real-time location tracking (RTLS), and AI-supported vehicle telematics.

The company operates various sectors, including manufacturing, logistics, and automotive, in over 65 countries, with major markets including the United States, United Kingdom, Germany, France, Poland, Italy, Austria, Netherlands, Turkey, and Mexico.

Trio Mobil's clients include multinational companies such as Coca-Cola, Saint-Gobain, PepsiCo, Prysmian Group, Nestlé, Unilever, Ford, Mercedes-Benz, Beko, BSH Hausgeräte, GE Aerospace, Cargill, Goodyear and others.

Trio Mobil is headquartered in Marietta, United States, and has regional offices and sales operations in the United States, United Kingdom, Germany, France, Poland, Netherlands and Turkey. The company employs more than 250 people.

Nevzat Ataklı is CEO, and Celal Barış Özdemir is CTO.
