= Yolanda's Law =

Argentine law

Yolanda's Law (Spanish: Ley Yolanda) is a national law of Argentina (Law 27.592) requiring mandatory environmental training for every member of the executive, legislative and judiciary branches of government. It was fully sanctioned and published in the Official Bulletin of the Argentine Republic on 15 December 2020. It is an eponymous law named after chemist Yolanda Ortiz, the first Secretary of Natural Resources and Human Environment of Argentina, appointed by then-president Juan Perón in 1973, who died in 2019 at the age of 94.

The law specifies that this mandatory training must include information about climate change, the protection of biodiversity and ecosystems, energy efficiency and renewable energies, the circular economy and sustainable development, as well as information related to current environmental regulations. Though not stated in the law, the Argentine government decreed that the training must last a minimum of 16 hours.

== History ==
The idea for the law was developed by 'Jovenes por el clima' (Youth for Climate) of San Luis Province, part of the Fridays for Future movement. It was taken up by San Luis councillor Julieta Ponce, and presented on 5 June 2020 in the Senate by Eugenia Catalfamo, senator for the Frente de Todos. It had cross-party support from, in particular, Senator Gladys González from Propuesta Republicana. The new law passed unanimously in the Argentine Senate.

It was proposed in the lower house, the Chamber of Deputies, on 20 July 2020 by Propuesta Repulibicana National Deputy Camila Crescimbeni, and was sanctioned by 213 votes in favor and 1 against. The fact that it was supported by the leading party at the time, Frente de todos, and the opposition, Propuesta Republicana, has been credited with its success.

The form of this law was similar to Micaela's Law, (Law 27.499), of 2019, which imposes a similar training obligation for public officials, but in terms of gender.

This law builds on the Escazú Agreement of 2018, particularly article 10, which asks parties to "develop and strengthen environmental law and access rights, awareness-raising and capacity-building programmes for, inter alia, the public, judicial and administrative officials, national human rights institutions and jurists".

=== Implementation ===
On 5 October 2022, then-President Alberto Fernández began the training along with senior members of the national Cabinet. As of September 2023, 50,000 officials of the three branches of government have been trained.

Provincial governments were not included in the law, but the provinces were invited to adopt it. Twenty-two provinces have so far passed Yolanda's Law. One, Formosa, is in the process of adoption.

=== Sanctions for non-adherence ===
It would be considered a serious offence for officials to refuse to take part in the training, and could lead to disciplinary sanction and naming of the official on the website of the enforcement authority.

=== Criticism ===
On the day of the vote in the Chamber of Deputies, 17 November 2020, Deputy Nicolás del Caño, criticized the "hypocrisy" and suggested that, although many may celebrate this law, at the same time, they promote harmful extractivist policies. Along these same lines, Deputy Romina Del Plá said that environmental protection is more a problem of interests than a problem of education.
