= Hearsay in English law =

The hearsay provisions of the Criminal Justice Act 2003 reformed the common law relating to the admissibility of hearsay evidence in criminal proceedings begun on or after 4 April 2005.

Section 114 of the Criminal Justice Act 2003 defines hearsay evidence as a statement not made in oral evidence in criminal proceedings and admissible as evidence of any matter stated but only if certain conditions are met, specifically where:

- It is in the interests of justice to admit it (see section 114(1)(d))
- The witness cannot attend (see section 116)
- The evidence is in a document (see section 117)
- The evidence is multiple hearsay (see section 121)

The meaning of "statements" and "matter stated" is explained in section 115 of the 2003 Act. "Oral evidence" is defined in section 134(1) of that Act.

== History of the rule ==
The rules of hearsay began to form properly in the late seventeenth century and had become fully established by the early nineteenth century. The issues were analysed in substantial detail in Wright v Doe d Tatham. The technical nature of the discussion in Doe d Tatham inhibited much reasoned progress of the law, whose progress (in the form of judicial capacity to reform it) ended not long afterwards. Later attempts to reform through the common law it got little further, with Lord Reid in Myers v DPP saying

If we are to extend the law it must be by the development and application of fundamental principles. We cannot introduce arbitrary conditions or limitations; that must be left to legislation: and if we do in effect change the law, we ought in my opinion only to do that in cases where our decision will produce some finality or certainty. If we disregard technicalities in this case and seek to apply principle and common sense, there are a number of parts of the existing law of hearsay susceptible of similar treatment, ... The only satisfactory solution is by legislation following on a wide survey of the whole field ... A policy of make do and mend is not appropriate.

There was some statutory reform in the nineteenth century (see Bankers' Books Evidence Act 1879), and later the Evidence Act 1938 made some further if cautious reforms. The state of the hearsay rules were regarded as 'absurd' by Lord Reid and Lord Diplock.

The Law Commission and Supreme Court committee provided a number of reports on hearsay reform, prior to the Civil Evidence Acts 1968 and 1972.

The Criminal Justice Act 2003 ("2003 Act"), which went into force on 4 April 2005, introduced significant reforms to the hearsay rule, implementing (with modifications) the report by the Law Commission in 'Evidence in Criminal Proceedings: Hearsay and Related Topics]'(LC245), published on 19 June 1997.

Previously, the Criminal Justice Act 1988 carved out exceptions to the hearsay rule for unavailable witnesses and business documents. These were consolidated into the 2003 Act.

== Reasoning behind the rule ==
The reasoning behind the hearsay rule can be seen by comparing the acceptance of direct evidence and hearsay. Direct evidence is given under oath (with potential criminal liability for perjury if the testimony is subsequently proven false), in the presence of the court and jury, and may be cross-examined. In adducing direct evidence (that is, recollection of a witness in court) the court considers how the witness would have perceived the event at the time, potential ambiguities, and the witness's sincerity. These can be tested in cross-examination.

A statement reported in hearsay is not generally subject to these safeguards. The person making the original statement was not testifying under oath, and was not subject to cross-examination. Even assuming that the witness reporting the original statement does so completely truthfully, it remains possible that the person making the original statement was lying, joking, or exaggerating. It is also possible that the witness testifying at trial misunderstood the original statement. The court has no way to assess these possibilities, except via the testimony of the witness reporting the hearsay.

Although the hearsay rule is directed only at references to statements asserted for the truth of their contents, the courts were alive to the dangers of circumstantial as well as direct evidence:

the hearsay rule operates in two ways: (a) it forbids using the credit of an absent declarant as the basis of an inference, and (b) it forbids using in the same way the mere evidentiary fact of the statement as having been made under such and such circumstances.

The nature of the genuine danger of allowing a jury to make an inappropriate inference about the nature of such evidence has led to misunderstandings about the nature of hearsay.

A different rationale can be found in the requirement of justice that the accused is entitled to face his or her opponents. This principle finds support in the European Convention on Human Rights (articles 6(1) and 6(3)(d)) and, in the United States the sixth amendment of its Constitution (its principles tracing back to Raleigh's Trial).

== Civil proceedings ==
Hearsay is generally admissible in civil proceedings. This is one area in which English law differs dramatically from American law; under the Federal Rules of Evidence, used in U.S. federal courts and followed practically verbatim in almost all states, hearsay is inadmissible in both criminal and civil trials barring a recognised exception.

The law concerning hearsay in civil proceedings was reformed substantially by the Civil Evidence Act 1995 ("the 1995 Act") and is now primarily upon a statutory footing. The Act arose from a report of the Law Commission published in 1993 which criticised the previous reforming statutes' excessive caution and cumbersome procedures. Section 1 of the Act says

In civil proceedings evidence shall not be excluded on the ground that it is hearsay

This includes hearsay of multiple degree (that is, hearsay evidence of hearsay evidence: for example "Jack told me that Jill told him that she went up the hill").

Other provisions of the 1995 Act preserve common law rules relating to public documents, published works of a public nature and public records. The common law in respect of good and bad character, reputation or family tradition is also preserved.

The Act moves some of the focus of hearsay evidence to weight, rather than admissibility, setting out considerations in assessing the evidence (set out in summary form):

- Reasonableness of the party calling the evidence to have produced the original maker
- Whether the original statement was made at or near the same time as the evidence it mentions
- Whether the evidence involves multiple hearsay
- Whether any person involved had any motive to conceal or misrepresent matters
- Whether the original statement was an edited account, or was made in collaboration with another, or for a particular purpose
- Whether the circumstances of the hearsay evidence suggest an attempt to prevent proper evaluation of its weight

== Criminal proceedings ==
=== Statutory definition ===
The Criminal Justice Act 2003 defines hearsay as statements "not made in oral evidence in the proceedings" being used "as evidence of any matter stated". If the statements are being used for purposes other than serving "as evidence of any matter stated", they are not covered by the definition of hearsay in the 2003 Act. It also does not cover statements that are not representations of a fact or opinion.

=== General rule ===
The general rule clearly states that hearsay will not be used in court proceedings as it is not generally admissible.

=== Statutory exceptions ===
==== Unavailable witnesses ====
A witness's testimony may be read in court if the witness is unavailable to attend.

To be admissible, the evidence must be otherwise admissible, and the maker of the statement identified to the court's satisfaction. Additionally, the absent person making the original statement must fall within one of following categories:

- Dead
- Unfit to be a witness because of bodily or mental condition
- Outside the United Kingdom and it is not reasonably practicable to secure their attendance
- Cannot be found, and reasonably practicable steps to find them have been taken
- Afraid to testify or continue to testify

In the case of absence through fear, additional safeguards are imposed prior to the statement's admission. The court must be satisfied it is in the interests of justice, particularly considering the statements contents, whether special measures (screens in court, or video live-link) would assist, and any unfairness to the defendant in not being able to challenge the evidence.

A party to the proceedings (that is, either the prosecution or defence) who causes any of the above five conditions to occur to stop a witness giving evidence, cannot then adduce the hearsay evidence of it.

The scope of this rule has been considered in cases when much of the prosecution case involves evidence by a witness who is absent from court. In Luca v Italy (2003), in the European Court of Human Rights, it was held that a conviction solely or decisively based upon evidence of witnesses which the accused has had no opportunity to examine breached Article 6 of the Convention (right to a fair trial). However in R v Arnold (2004), in the Court of Appeal, it was said this rule would permit of some exceptions, otherwise it would provide a licence to intimidate witnesses - though neither should it be treated as a licence for prosecutors to prevent testing of their case. Each application had to be weighed carefully.

==== Business documents ====
Documents created in the course of a trade, occupation, profession or public office (referred to as "business") can be used as evidence of the facts stated therein.

To be admissible, the evidence referred to in the document must itself be admissible. The person supplying the information must have had personal knowledge of it (or be reasonably supposed to have had), and everyone else through whom the information was supplied must have also been acting in the course of business.

If the business information was produced in the course of a domestic criminal investigation, then either one of the above five categories (for absent witnesses) must apply, or the person producing the statement cannot be expected now to have any recollection of the original information. A typical example of this is doctor's notes in relation to an injured person, which is then adduced as medical evidence in a criminal trial. Previous criminal records can be adduced (if otherwise admissible) under this section, but not normally any further details about the method of commission, unless it can be demonstrated that the data inputter had the appropriate personal knowledge.

==== Previous consistent and inconsistent statements ====
Sometimes during the testimony of a witness, the witness may be questioned about statements he previously made outside court on an earlier occasion, to demonstrate either that he has been consistent or inconsistent in his account of events. The Act did not change the circumstances in which such statements could become admissible in evidence (which are still prescribed in the Criminal Procedure Act 1865), but it did change the evidential effect of such statements once admitted. Formerly, such statements were not evidence of the facts stated in them (unless the witness agreed with them in court): they only proved that the witness had kept his story straight or had changed his story, and so were only evidence of his credibility (or lack of it) as a witness. They were not hearsay. Under the 2003 Act, however, such statements are now themselves evidence of any facts stated in them, not just of credibility, and so are now hearsay.

=== Preserved common law exceptions ===
Section 118 of the 2003 Act preserved the following common law rules and abolished the remainder:

- Public information as evidence of the facts stated therein:
  - published works dealing with matters of a public nature (such as histories, scientific works, dictionaries and maps)
  - public documents (such as public registers, and returns made under public authority with respect to matters of public interest)
  - records (such as the records of certain courts, treaties, Crown grants, pardons and commissions)
  - evidence relating to a person's age or date or place of birth may be given by a person without personal knowledge of the matter
- Reputation as to character - evidence of a person's reputation is admissible for the purpose of proving his good or bad character
- Reputation or family tradition - evidence of reputation or family tradition is admissible to prove or disprove (and only so far as it does so):
  - pedigree or the existence of a marriage (or civil partnership following the Civil Partnership Act 2004)
  - the existence of any public or general right
  - the identity of any person or thing
- Res gestae - statements are admissible if:
  - the statement was made by a person so emotionally overpowered by an event that the possibility of concoction or distortion can be disregarded,
  - the statement accompanied an act which can be properly evaluated as evidence only if considered in conjunction with the statement, or
  - the statement relates to a physical sensation or a mental state (such as intention or emotion).
- Confessions - all rules relating to the admissibility of confessions or mixed statements
- Admissions by agents etc. as evidence of facts stated:
  - an admission made by an agent of a defendant is admissible against the defendant as evidence of any matter stated, or
  - a statement made by a person to whom a defendant refers a person for information is admissible against the defendant as evidence of any matter stated.
- Common enterprise - a statement made by a party to a common enterprise is admissible against another party to the enterprise
- Expert evidence

==== Agreement ====
Hearsay evidence is permitted by agreement between all parties in the proceedings. No such provision existed before the coming into force of the 2003 Act.

==== Interests of justice ====
There are some older cases which threw the rigidities of the hearsay rule into sharp relief. In a Bermudan case before the Privy Council, Sparks v R, an American airman was accused of indecently assaulting a girl just under the age of four. Evidence that the four-year-old victim (who did not give evidence herself) had told her mother "it was a coloured boy" was held not to be admissible (not being res gestae either) against the defendant, who was white.

In R v Blastland (1986) the House of Lords held in a murder case that highly self-incriminating remarks made by a third party, not at the trial, could not be admitted in evidence (the remarks mentioning the murder of a boy whose body had not yet been independently discovered).

Under the 2003 Act, any hearsay evidence whether or not covered by another provision may be admitted by the court if it is "in the interests of justice" to do so. This provision is sometimes known as the "safety valve".

The Act sets out criteria in determining whether the interests of justice test are met, and provides for consideration of other relevant factors:

- How much probative value (that is, use in determining the case) the statement has (assuming it to be true), or its value in understanding other evidence;
- What other relevant evidence has been or can be given;
- Its importance in the context of the case as a whole;
- Circumstances in which the statement was made;
- How reliable the maker of the statement appears to be;
- How reliable the evidence in the statement appears to be;
- Whether oral evidence can be given and, if not, why not;
- The difficulty involved in challenging the statement;
- The extent to which that difficulty would prejudice the party facing it.
