= CYBRA =

CYBRA Corporation
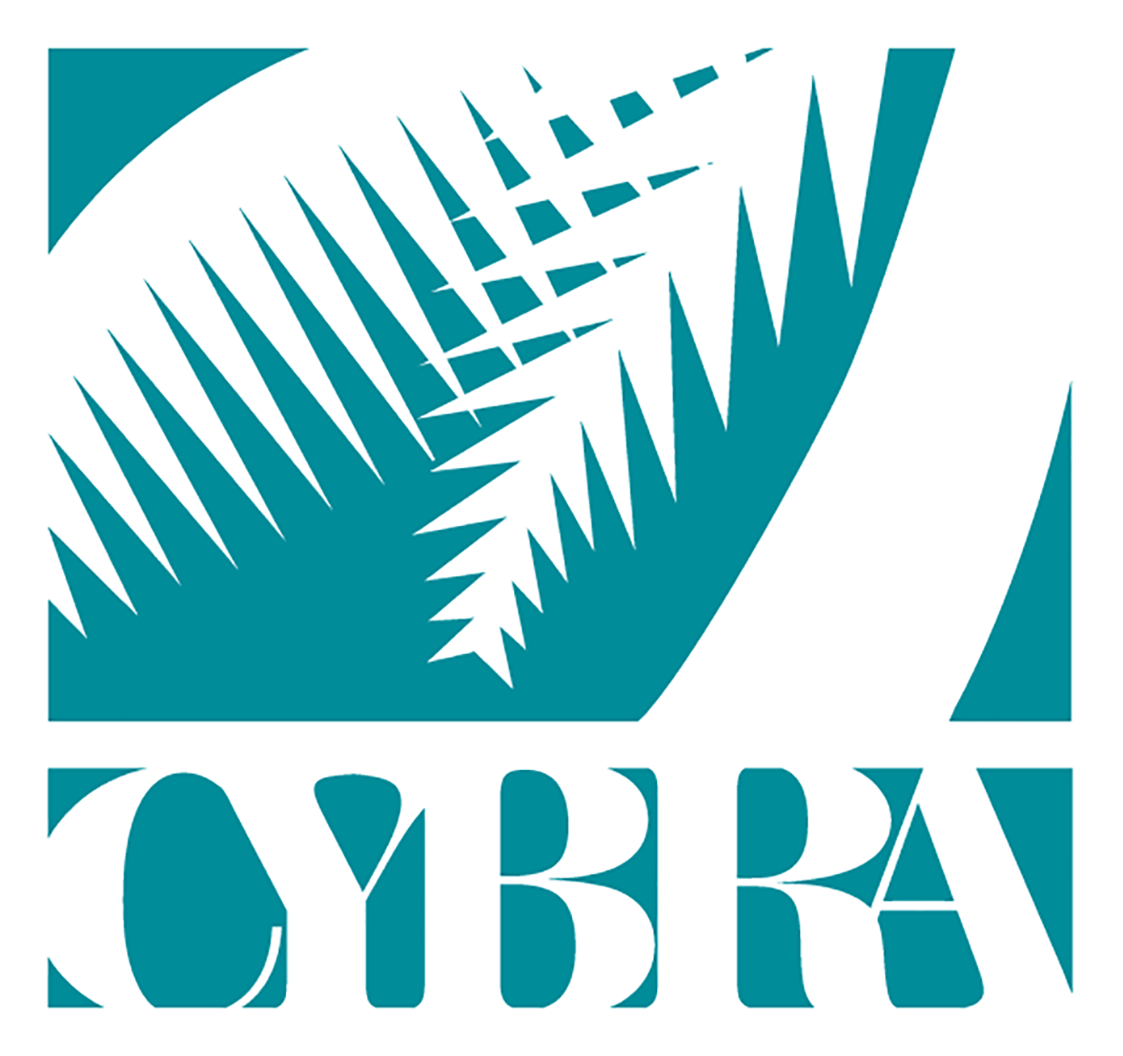
- Type: Public
- Traded as: Grey Market: CYRP
- Industry: Computer software
- Founded: 1985
- Founder: Harold L. Brand
- Headquarters: West Seneca, New York, US
- Key people: Harold L. Brand (CEO)
- Products: RFID, RTLS, and bar code printer/encoders, labels, tags, forms software, and scanning systems

CYBRA Corporation is a software developer, publisher, and systems integrator in the IBM midrange market. CYBRA provides bar codes, RFID, and RTLS systems for IBM Power Systems and other server lines and other major computing platforms, bar code label and tag printing, and bar code scanning systems.

== History ==
CYBRA was founded as a New York corporation in 1985. The company began operations as a technology-marketing company, but moved into a product-development company by the late 1980s. In 1990, CYBRA released a barcode labeling product called MarkMagic. MarkMagic is CYBRA's flagship product, and is used by over 2,000 companies. The latest version of MarkMagic is MarkMagic X, which was released in 2020. Along with being a standalone product, MarkMagic is built inside enterprise resource planning (ERP) and warehouse management system (WMS) applications including Manhattan Associates' WMi and WMOS. MarkMagic supports approximately 500 barcode printer types. In 2018, MarkMagic added support for packaging machinery and duplex printing.

CYBRA became an IBM Business Partner in June 1988. CYBRA became a public company in December 2006.

In 2008, CYBRA entered the RFID industry with the release of their passive RFID tagging software, EdgeMagic. Along with Key West Technologies LLC, in 2009 CYBRA formed a joint venture with the Waterborne Transportation Institute (WTI) of the Ministry of Transport of the People's Republic of China to create tracking software to improve the handling of maritime shipping containers. In 2016, CYBRA released Edgefinity IoT RFID software. The software provides applications for asset tracking, lone worker safety monitoring, work in process deployment, and supply chain management.

== Awards ==
In 2023, the company was announced as a winner of the annual AIM Case Study Competition in the area of automatic identification and data capture (AIDC).

== Location ==
From its founding until 2025 CYBRA’s headquarters were in Yonkers, New York. In 2014, CYBRA relocated its headquarters to the iPark Hudson office park, near the Yonkers train station and waterfront. Their main office were where The Otis Elevator Company developed the first modern safety elevator. In 2025, CYBRA relocated its headquarters, along with its sales and technical support to West Seneca, New York.

== Products ==
The company has developed products for different kinds of RFID and barcode software as well as companion hardware. Products include:

- MarkMagic – Manages bar codes and RFID systems
- EdgeMagic RFID Software – Integrated RFID control system
- Edgefinity IoT – Real time asset and personnel tracking software application
- CYBRA RFID Cage – A pre-configured conveyor belt enclosure meant to validate outgoing shipments for manufacturers. The Cage can provide 99% read accuracy when conveyor lines move at speeds of up to 600 feet per minute.
- Hawk Antenna – A retail loss prevention portal
- RFID Lock & EnCode SmartSeals

== Partners ==
CYBRA is a Gold Level network partner with Oracle.

Other CYBRA partners:

- Alien Technology
- Avery Dennison
- Citizen Systems
- Epson
- Honeywell
- IBM
- Impinj
- Intermec
- Motorola
- Printronix
- RMS Omega
- SATO
- Xerafy
- Zebra Technologies
