= WorkSafeBC =

Statutory agency in British Columbia, Canada

Workers Compensation Board of British Columbia
- Type: Statutory Agency
- Industry: Regulatory Agency / Workers' Compensation
- Founded: 1917
- Headquarters: Richmond, British Columbia, Canada
- Website: www.worksafebc.com/en

The Workers' Compensation Board of British Columbia, operating as WorkSafeBC, is a statutory agency that was made in 1917, after the provincial legislature put into force legislation passed in 1902. This legislation is known as the Workers Compensation Act.

WorkSafeBC's mandate includes prevention of occupational injury and occupational disease, which WorkSafeBC accomplishes through education, consultation, and enforcement. It carries out workplace inspections and investigates serious incidents, such as fatalities. The Workers Compensation Act assigns the authority to make the Occupational Health and Safety Regulation of British Columbia.

WorkSafeBC's authority over the occupational health and safety of workers does not extend to mines, which are under the authority of the Ministry of Energy and Mines or federally regulated employers, which are under the authority of the Federal Labour Program within Employment and Social Development Canada.

== Working conditions in British Columbia before Workers Compensation ==
In the past there have been numerous Royal Commissions that have examined the effectiveness of Workers Compensation. These commissions have attempted to explain working conditions prior to Workers Compensation legislation, where British Columbia's workforce was largely occupied in the fishing, logging, and mining industries. The Royal Commissions concluded that documented injuries are limited, with the exception of mining, and therefore little is known of working conditions before the Workers Compensation Act (WCA). One line from a Royal Commission document reads, "There are no sources to reveal nineteenth-century workplace conditions in two other significant B.C. industries, agriculture and fishing". However, this argument ignores the documentation of injuries in early Workers Compensation documents from canneries. Although workers compensation documents do not provide a direct account of the working conditions before legislation, they do provide incidents that occurred in the workplace. More precisely, the injuries documented in Workers Compensation documents can be extrapolated as similar, if not identical, injuries, to the period before Workers Compensation in 1917. For example, injuries in the fishing industry, controlled largely by canneries, included finger strain, muscle strains, cuts, infections, burns, and more. Many of these injuries were preventable and happened before the introduction of the WCA and subsequent regulations. The ability to prevent these injuries is best evidenced by several Workers Compensation letters urging employers to follow new and existing safeguards. Employees most likely knew of the condition of the unsafe work, as litigation became the primary means of seeking some compensation. Employees believed the employers were responsible for compensating their inability to work. The employees also believed that the injuries that they received at work were the fault of the company and compensation was the companies' responsibility to pay. Further, employees often noted, "unsafe conditions, long hours, and unsanitary working conditions."

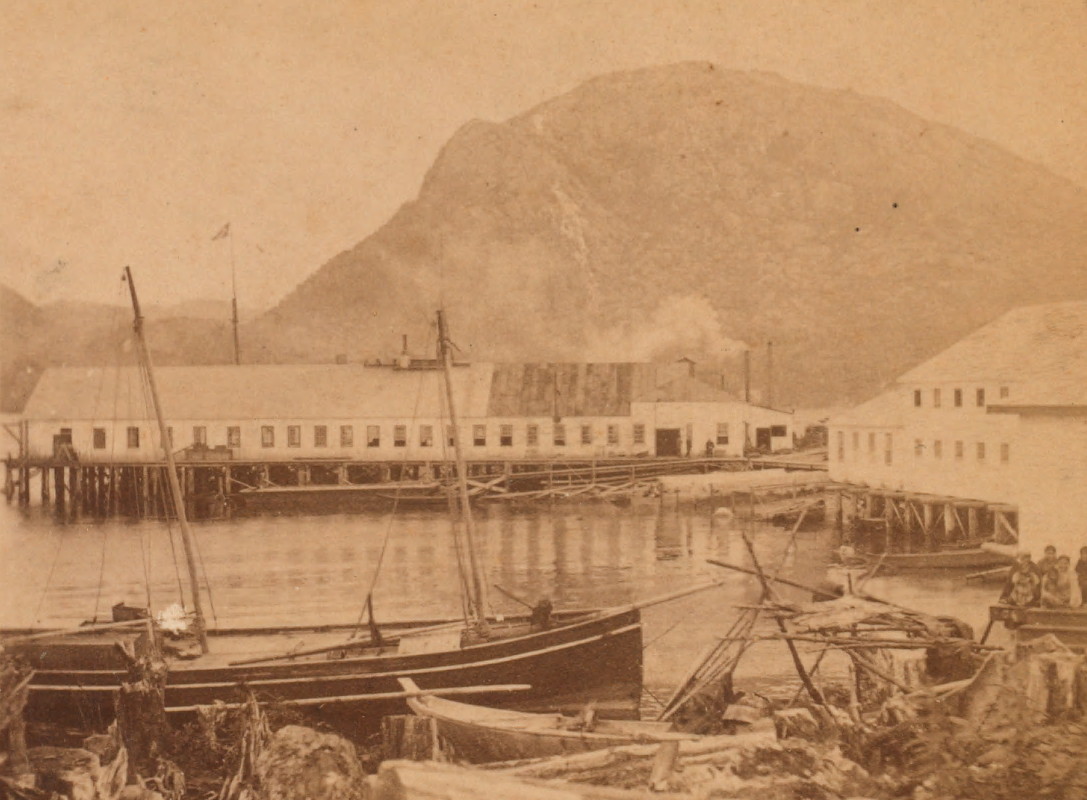
A cannery with a small docked fishing vessel

=== Working conditions in the fishing industry ===
The fishing industry in relation to the booming canning industry became tied in terms of income and eventually supplies. Early on the canning industry heavily relied on First Nation fishermen. Historian Douglas Harris argues of the preexisting fishing rights of First Nation's people and the importance of fishing to many coastal First Nations. Furthermore, societies that were knowledgeable and capable in many aspects of fishing provided fish for canneries. Eventually, with capitalist tendencies, canneries began hiring and equipping more Japanese fishermen as a means of cheap labour. Working conditions in the perspective of the fishermen seemed quite good. Fishermen often felt greater freedom in their work in the responsibility of maintaining their boats, larger amounts of choice compared to other employment, the outdoor experiences, and escaping factory type employment. Within the canneries, housing and work was segregated by race and gender. Chinese men, typically, filleted and butchered the fish. However, this occupation slowly became obsolete with the innovation and implementation of the derogatory, "Iron Chink" or in more correct terms, "Iron Butcher". Hazards included knife cuts, pinched or crushed fingers in the case of machinery, and fish cuts and subsequent infections. First Nations women were responsible for the cleaning of fish. Early on this was done in large basins filled with cold sea water and later through a mechanized process involving conveyor belts. The cold water and repetitive motions involved in cleaning away fish slime and guts made for not entirely pleasant conditions. Injuries likely consisted of back strains, wrist strains, infections, and repetitive motion disease. Housing conditions are also relevant to workplace conditions in the canning industry as most employees lived on the work-site. The North Pacific Cannery, one of many canneries which operated on the Skeena Inlet, and now a National Historic site, reveals racial segregation. Japanese houses were on one end of the cannery site, the First Nations housing on the opposite, European housing in between, and remains of Chinese housing suggest they were the furthest away from the cannery's main factory. The Japanese, Chinese and First Nation houses all consisted of single rooms not very large in area. In the case of First Nations, since they often brought their entire families, it was common to have 6 people or more in the single-room house. European management houses, conversely, were substantially larger and nicer. Overall, workplaces in canneries, including associated housing, often did not provide equal opportunities. Furthermore, the working conditions within canneries were frequently less than desirable, particularly with regard to housing.

== Before Workers Compensation Legislation ==
=== Lawsuits ===
Before the Workers Compensation Act compensation from employers was received primarily through litigation. However, some companies did provide some compensation, regarding injuries or death of employees, but it was often unsatisfactory. In a result, employees commonly would sue employers to cover loss of wages and medical bills. A Workers Compensation news bulletin from 1960 titled, "What Led up to Worker's Compensation Legislation", presents three defenses used by employers involved in lawsuits with employees. The defenses were based on:

1. Fault of the Fellow Workmen
2. Assumption by workman of the ordinary risks of the job
3. Contributory Negligence on the part of the workman

These defenses, in practice, led to employers winning the majority of cases and the employees were left without sufficient or any compensation. The common law made it far too easy for employers to avoid paying compensation. By the defense "Fault of the Fellow Workmen" the employer could not be liable if an employee could be found partially at fault. Similarly, the "Assumption by workman of the ordinary risks of the job" defense allowed employers to claim that there were certain risks which the employee accepted by taking the job, and therefore the employer(s) could not be held liable. Finally, the "Contributory Negligence on the part of the workman" defense allowed for conditions where if an employee could be found minimally at fault the employer would be found not liable. There was also a disinclination for fellow employees to witness for their fellow employee(s) under fear of repercussions from their employer. Understandably, such results, predominantly in the favour of employers, created unrest. Employees had low prospects in acquiring compensation from employers through litigation. However, as litigation was the only means of receiving compensation, it was still heavily attempted. By 1897 the Employers Liability Act was established attempting to resolve the increasing conflicts and lawsuits between employees and employers. However, the Employers Liability Act was very limited in its beneficiaries, to only people 21 years and older who were either railroad workers or manual laborers. Nevertheless, the Act enabled the eligible to claim up to $2000, although later lowered to $1500. In general, the creation of the Employers Liability Act was beneficial yet it did not apply to a large portion of the workforce. For example, most cannery workers would be ineligible to use the Act and would therefore continue to use litigation as a means of attempting compensation. The Employers Liability Act did not solve the problems of employee unrest or busy courts. Employers also began to feel uneasy as British Columbia's economy was suffering and a single lawsuit could cause significant debts.

== Workers Compensation Acts ==
=== The Workers Compensation Act 1902 ===
The next implementation after the Employers Liability Act 1897 was the 1902 Workmen's Compensation Act. This act was fundamentally better for employees as it enforced compensation for the injured worker(s) even if the worker was slightly at fault. More precisely, the 1902 Workmen's Compensation Act would allow the employee(s) to receive compensation unless they were overtly reckless. The new WCA allowed more workers to be eligible. The WCA now included miners, factory and construction workers. Further, it allowed for arbiters in order to limit the large number of cases the courts had to work. Although more people could benefit from the 1902 WCA it still did not benefit loggers and a few other industries. Since the WCA still required either courts, or an arbiter, processing was still quite slow. In 1916 a document titled the "Pineo Report" suggested that British Columbia should follow the example of Ontario and implement an administration board. The report confirmed that industries should, predominantly, be held responsible for accidents. The report also suggested that efforts made towards securing compensation for employers should be shared in efforts to prevent workplace incidents. The report's suggestions were made necessary as the Workmen's Compensation Act, with the new option of arbitration, seemed ineffective in decreasing litigation. On the contrary, evidence suggests that after the 1902 WCA, the courts became even busier.

=== The Workers Compensation Act of 1917 ===
By 1917 another act was passed known as the Workers Compensation Act of 1917 responding to the concerns addressed by the "Pineo Report". Unsurprisingly, preventing workplace incidents and enabling compensation are values shared by WorkSafeBC today as were addressed by the "Pineo Report". By method of compromise the 1917 act included regulations for medical aid. The regulations allowed finances to be collected from employees at a fixed rate per day while the employers would cover any outstanding costs. In short, the WCA of 1917 set up the framework for which amendments would be made, resulting in the WorkSafeBC that exists today.
