= Criminal Procedure Act =

Stock short title used for legislation

Criminal Procedure Act (with its variations) is a stock short title used for legislation relating to criminal procedure in the United Kingdom and other jurisdictions influenced by English common law.

The bill for an act with this short title may have been known as a Criminal Procedure Bill during its passage through Parliament.

Criminal Procedure Acts may be a generic name either for legislation bearing that short title or for all legislation which relates to criminal procedure.

== List ==
=== Australia ===
- The Criminal Procedure Act 1986 (NSW)
- The Criminal Procedure Act 2004 (SA)
- The Criminal Procedure Act 2009 (Vic)
- The Criminal Procedure Act 2004 (WA)

=== Hong Kong ===
- The Criminal Procedure Ordinance 1899

=== Malaysia ===
- The Criminal Procedure Code

=== New Zealand ===
- The Criminal Procedure Act 2011
- The Criminal Procedure (Mentally Impaired Persons) Act 2003

=== Republic of Ireland ===
- The Criminal Procedure Act 2010
- The Criminal Procedure (Amendment) Act 2007
- The Criminal Procedure Act, 1993
- The Criminal Procedure (Amendment) Act, 1973
- The Criminal Procedure Act, 1967

=== South Africa ===
- The Criminal Procedure and Evidence Act, 1917 (No 31)
- The Criminal Procedure and Evidence Act, 1917, Amendment Act 1927 (No 7)
- The Criminal Procedure and Jurors Amendment Act 1954 (No 21)
- The Criminal Procedure and Evidence Amendment Act 1955 (No 29)
- The Criminal Procedure Act, 1955 (No 56)
- The Criminal Procedure Amendment Act, 1958 (No 9)
- The Criminal Procedure Amendment Act, 1963 (No 92)
- The Criminal Procedure Amendment Act, 1965 (No 96)
- The Criminal Procedure Amendment Act, 1968 (No 9)
- The Criminal Procedure Act, 1977 (No 51)
- The Criminal Procedure Matters Amendment Act, 1978
- The Criminal Procedure Amendment Act, 1979
- The Criminal Procedure Amendment Act, 1982
- The Criminal Procedure Matters Amendment Act, 1984
- The Criminal Procedure Amendment Act, 1986
- The Criminal Procedure Amendment Act, 1987
- The Law of Evidence and the Criminal Procedure Act Amendment Act, 1987
- The Criminal Procedure Amendment Act, 1989
- The Criminal Law and the Criminal Procedure Act Amendment Act, 1989
- The Criminal Procedure Amendment Act, 1991
- The Criminal Procedure Second Amendment Act, 1995
- The Criminal Procedure Amendment Act, 1996
- The Criminal Procedure Second Amendment Act, 1996
- The Criminal Procedure Amendment Act, 1997
- The Criminal Procedure Second Amendment Act, 1997
- The Criminal Procedure Amendment Act, 2001
- The Criminal Procedure Second Amendment Act, 2001
- The Criminal Procedure Amendment Act, 2003
- The Criminal Procedure Amendment Act, 2008

=== United Kingdom ===
Applying to two or more of the three jurisdictions (England and Wales, Scotland, Ireland to 1922; E+W, S, NI after)

- The Criminal Procedure and Investigations Act 1996 (c. 25)
- The Criminal Procedure (Attendance of Witnesses) Act 1965 (c. 69)
- The Criminal Procedure Act 1865 (28 & 29 Vict. c. 18) or Denman's Act
- The Criminal Procedure Act 1851 (14 & 15 Vict. c. 100)
- The Criminal Procedure Act 1848 (11 & 12 Vict. c. 46)

==== England and Wales ====
- The Criminal Procedure (Insanity and Unfitness to Plead) Act 1991 (c. 25)
- The Criminal Procedure (Insanity) Act 1964 (c. 84) – also applies to the Court Martial outside England and Wales
- The Criminal Procedure (Right Of Reply) Act 1964 (c. 34)
- The Criminal Procedure Act 1853 (c. 30)

==== Scotland ====
- The Criminal Procedure (Legal Assistance, Detention and Appeals) (Scotland) Act 2010 (asp 15)
- The Criminal Procedure (Amendment) (Scotland) Act 2004 (asp 5)
- The Criminal Procedure (Amendment) (Scotland) Act 2002 (asp 4)
- The Criminal Procedure (Intermediate Diets) (Scotland) Act 1998 (c. 10)
- The Criminal Procedure (Scotland) Act 1995 (c. 46)
- The Criminal Procedure (Consequential Provisions) (Scotland) Act 1995 (c. 40)
- The Criminal Procedure (Scotland) Act 1975 (c. 21)
- The Criminal Procedure (Scotland) Act 1887 (c. 35) (repealed 1 April 1996)
- The Criminal Procedure Act 1701 (c. 6)

==== Northern Ireland ====
- The Criminal Procedure (Majority Verdicts) Act (Northern Ireland) 1971 (c. 37) (N.I.)

== See also ==
List of short titles
