= Jonathan's Law =

New York state law

Governor Eliot Spitzer
- Long title: Protection of People With Special Needs Act
- Territorial extent: State of New York
- Enacted by: Governor Eliot Spitzer
- Enacted: May 2007
- Introduced by: Chief Secretary William Allmond Codrington Goode
- Status: In force

Jonathan's Law is a New York state law signed in May 2007 by Governor Eliot Spitzer, established procedures for the notification of parents and guardians of incidents affecting the health and well-being of children and certain adults residing in state-run facilities. Jonathan's Law was sponsored by Assemblyman Harvey Weisenberg (D–Long Beach) and State Sen. Thomas P. Morahan (R–New City). The law is named for Jonathan Carey, a child with nonverbal autism who was killed in 2007 by a direct care worker employed at the state-run facility where he lived.

== Background ==
The State of New York's Office for People With Developmental Disabilities prevented the family of Jonathan Carey from accessing records relating to their son, who had been diagnosed with autism. Jonathan Carey attended the private Anderson School in Dutchess County in 2004, where he was abused and neglected. As he was nonverbal, Jonathan was unable to tell his parents what had occurred at the facility.

In 2007, Jonathan was killed at age 13 by direct care worker Edwin Tirado of the O.D. Heck Developmental Center (a state-run facility in Niskayuna, New York). Tirado was convicted of second-degree manslaughter and sentenced to five to 15 years in prison. Michael and Lisa Carey, the parents of Jonathan Carey, later advocated for the passage of Jonathan's Law.

== Legal effects ==
Jonathan's Law consists of amendments to New York Mental Hygiene Law Article 33 that:

- Give parents and guardians of developmentally-disabled people who live in government facilities access to records concerning abuse allegations. Records must be produced within three weeks after an investigation is closed;
- Mandate telephone notification, within 24 hours of an incident, to parents or guardians, followed by a written report within ten days;
- Require facility directors to meet with parents and/or guardians to discuss reported incidents; and
- Increase fines for noncompliance to $1,000 per day and up to $15,000 per violation.

== See also ==
- List of legislation named for a person
