= Zainab Alert Bill =

Pakistan child safety bill

Zainab Alert Bill, also called Zainab Alert, Response and Recovery Act 2019, is a Government of Pakistan law that defines the system of one window operations to notify the public and recover kidnapped children in Pakistan. The bill originated in Pakistan and defines its own comprehensive indigenous version of Amber Alert. The bill creates a new federal agency called ZARRA which shall be responsible to reduce child kidnapping, improve recovery and increase awareness against sexual abuse of children across all provinces of Pakistan. Zainab Alert Act provides ease of use to the missing child's parents/guardians to notify the Police. The Act also provides a process for the local police department to issue an emergency alert using emergency broadcasting system on mobile phones within a 20 km region where the child was last seen. A major key feature of the Act is to establish a national database of missing and recovered children applicable across Pakistan and makes the ZARRA agency accountable to submit quarterly reports to the National Assembly of Pakistan.

== Background ==
The ZARRA 2019 Act takes its name after Zainab Ansari, a six-year-old child who was kidnapped on 4 January 2018 in Kasur, raped and murdered by a child predator and serial killer, Imran Ali, a mechanic who lived in her neighborhood. Zainab's body was recovered on 9 January 2018 and was followed by massive protests across Pakistan that called on the Government of Pakistan to take up protective measures for children against increased incidents of sexual abuse and violence.

The bill's first draft was turned over to Asad Umar, an elected member of National Assembly of Pakistan for introduction into the National Assembly of Pakistan in February 2018. The bill was filed into the National Assembly on 14 March 2018. In August 2018, when the new Imran Khan led government came to power in Pakistan, the Human rights ministry led by Shireen Mazari was instructed to lead the passing of the bill. Naeem Sadiq and Shimaila Matri Dawood of Kasur Hamara Hai (KHH), a citizen's advocacy group for child protection and welfare, drafted a new proposed bill which included the formation of a government agency, ZARRA, responsible for coordinating and establishing a nationwide alert and recovery process as well as a continuously updated national database of abducted and trafficked children, among other actions.

On 8 October 2019 Zainab Alert bill was passed by the National Assembly committee. The bill was also passed by Senate on 4 March 2020 and was sent to the lower house of parliament where it was passed.

== Reception ==
Zainab Alert Bill has been largely supported by human rights advocacy groups including a Facebook advocacy group called 'Kasur Hamara hai' (KHH), led by Shimaila Mitri Dawood.

== See also ==
- Child abuse in Pakistan
