= Paroline v. United States =

2014 United States Supreme Court case

Paroline v. U.S.
- Supreme Court of the United States

Argued January 22, 2014 Decided April 23, 2014
- Full case name: Doyle Randall Paroline, Petitioner v. United States, et al.
- Docket no.: 12-8561
- Citations: 572 U.S. 434 (more) 134 S. Ct. 1710; 188 L. Ed. 2d 714

Case history
- Prior: 701 F.3d 749 (5th Cir. 2012); cert. granted, 570 U.S. 931 (2013).

Holding
- To recover restitution, the government or the victim must establish a causal relationship between the defendant's conduct and the victim's harm or damages.

Court membership
- Chief Justice John Roberts Associate Justices Antonin Scalia · Anthony Kennedy; Clarence Thomas · Ruth Bader Ginsburg; Stephen Breyer · Samuel Alito; Sonia Sotomayor · Elena Kagan

Case opinions
- Majority: Kennedy, joined by Ginsburg, Breyer, Alito, Kagan
- Dissent: Roberts, joined by Scalia, Thomas
- Dissent: Sotomayor

Laws applied
- 18 U.S.C. § 2259
- Abrogated by
- Amy, Vicky, and Andy Child Pornography Victim Assistance Act of 2018

Paroline v. United States, 572 U.S. 434 (2014), is a case in which the United States Supreme Court ruled that to recover restitution under 18 U.S.C. § 2259, the government or the victim must establish a causal relationship between the defendant's conduct and the victim's harm or damages. The decision vacated the appellate court decision, and remanded it. A legislative fix was subsequently proposed by Marci Hamilton. Ultimately, the Amy, Vicky, and Andy Child Pornography Victim Assistance Act of 2018 was introduced in response.
