= Criminal Procedure Act 1853 =

Act of the Parliament of the United Kingdom

Criminal Procedure Act 1853 (Note: The citation of this act by this short title was authorised by section 1 of, and the first schedule to, the Short Titles Act 1896. Due to the repeal of those provisions it is now authorised by section 19(2) of the Interpretation Act 1978.)
- Act of Parliament
- Parliament of the United Kingdom
- Long title: An Act [for the better Prevention and Punishment of aggravated Assaults upon Women and Children, and] for preventing Delay and Expense in the Administration of certain Parts of the Criminal Law.
- Citation: 16 & 17 Vict. c. 30
- Territorial extent: England and Wales (Note: Section 10.)

Dates
- Royal assent: 14 June 1853
- Commencement: 14 June 1853 (Note: The Acts of Parliament (Commencement) Act 1793.)
Other legislation
Amended by	Criminal Statutes Repeal Act 1861; Statute Law Revision Act 1892; Magistrates' Courts Act 1952; Courts Act 1971

Status: Partially repealed

Text of statute as originally enacted

Revised text of statute as amended

Text of the Criminal Procedure Act 1853 as in force today (including any amendments) within the United Kingdom, from legislation.gov.uk.

The Criminal Procedure Act 1853 (16 & 17 Vict. c. 30) is an act of the Parliament of the United Kingdom. It makes provision for the giving of evidence by prisoners otherwise than at their own trial.

== Provisions ==
Section 10 of the act provided that the act did not extend to Scotland or Ireland. In the United Kingdom, the reference to Ireland must now be construed as a reference to Northern Ireland.

=== Section 9 – Bringing up a prisoner to give evidence ===
It shall be lawful for... any judge of the [High Court]... in any case where he may see fit to do so, upon application by affidavit, to issue a warrant or order under his hand for bringing up any prisoner or person confined in any gaol, prison, or place, under any sentence or under commitment for trial or otherwise, (except under process in any civil action, suit or proceeding,) before any court, judge, justice, or other judicature, to be examined as a witness in any cause or matter, civil or criminal depending or to be inquired of or determined in or before such court, judge, justice, or other judicature; and the person required by such warrant or order to be so brought before such court, judge, justice, or other judicature, shall be so brought under the same care and custody, and be dealt with in the like manner in all respects, as a prisoner required by any writ of habeas corpus awarded by any of her Majesty's Superior Courts of Law at [the Royal Courts of Justice] to be brought before such court to be examined as a witness in any cause or matter depending before such court is now by law required to be dealt with.

== Subsequent developments ==
Section 1 of the act was repealed by section 1 of, and the schedule to, Criminal Statutes Repeal Act 1861 (24 & 25 Vict. c. 95), which came into force on 1 November 1861. It was replaced by section 43 of the Offences against the Person Act 1861 (24 & 25 Vict. c. 100).

The words "One of Her Majesty's Principal Secretaries of State, or" in the first place of section 9 of the act were repealed by section 15 of, and the schedule to, the Prison Act 1898 (61 & 62 Vict. c. 41), which came into force on 1 January 1899.

The preamble to, sections 3–8 of, and the words "or Common Pleas, or any Baron of the Exchequer" in the second place of section 9 of, the act were repealed by section 1 of, and the schedule to, the Statute Law Revision Act 1892 (55 & 56 Vict. c. 19), which came into force on 20 June 1892. The words words "The Royal Courts of Justice" in section 9 of the act were substituted for "Westminster" by 224(1) of Supreme Court of Judicature (Consolidation) Act 1925 (15 & 16 Geo. 5. c. 49), which came into force on 1 January 1926. Halsbury's Statutes has the word "Westminster" instead. The words "High Court" were substituted for the words "Court of Queen's Bench". The jurisdiction of that court is now vested in the High Court.

Section 2 of the act was repealed by section 56(4) of, and part IV of schedule 11 to, the Courts Act 1971, which came into force on 1 January 1972.

== See also ==
- Criminal Procedure Act

== Bibliography ==
- Halsbury's Statutes
- John Mounteney Lely. "The Criminal Procedure Act, 1853". The Statutes of Practical Utility. (Chitty's Statutes). Fifth Edition. Sweet and Maxwell. Stevens and Sons. London. 1894. Volume 3. Title "Criminal Law". Pages 85 to 87.
- William Paterson (ed). "Aggravated Assaults Act". The Practical Statutes of the Session 1853. John Crockford. Essex Street, Strand, London. 1853. Pages 25 to 30.
