= Child abuse in Pakistan =

Pakistan ranks third globally in reports of online child sexual abuse material, after India and the Philippines. Child sexual abuse remains a largely under-addressed issue in the country, despite repeated national outcry following high-profile cases such as the Kasur child sexual abuse scandal and the 2018 Zainab case.

In the first half of 2022, an average of 12 children were sexually abused per day, and in 2023, Sahil documented 2,227 child abuse victims, 54% of them girls. The NGO Sahil compiles annual statistics on child sexual abuse in its report Cruel Numbers, documenting thousands of incidents nationwide. International organisations such as UNICEF and Save the Children have warned that widespread stigma, weak enforcement, and gaps in child protection laws contribute to underreporting and impunity.

While the problem remains under-recognized, the government has introduced measures such as awareness campaigns, child protection helplines, provincial protection units, and laws including the Zainab Alert, Response and Recovery Act, 2020 to strengthen prevention and response mechanisms.

== Forms of abuse ==
=== Physical abuse ===
Physical abuse of children in Pakistan includes beatings, burnings and other forms of corporal punishment in homes, schools and Madrassas. Despite legal restrictions on corporal punishment in some settings, the practice persists in many schools and madrasas and has been linked to school dropouts and long term psychological harm. A high-profile madrasa abuse case in Mansehra led to criminal proceedings in 2020. In 2024, SSDO documented 683 cases of physical abuse of children nationwide.

=== Sexual abuse ===
Child sexual abuse is a major concern and is reported across urban and rural areas. According to NGO Sahil, thousands of incidents are recorded annually. Sahil's monitoring project recorded over 4,000 reports in its 2023 survey. Victims are frequently abused by family members, neighbours or persons in positions of authority, and many cases go unreported due to stigma and fear. SSDO reported 2,954 child sexual abuse cases in 2024.

Notable incidents that spurred national attention include the Kasur child sexual abuse scandal and the 2018 murder of Zainab Ansari, both of which prompted public protests and calls for legal reform. In 2019 killing of Faizan Muhammad in Kasur and the 2023 Fatima Phuriro case received widespread media coverage and renewed calls for improved child protection. Fatima was allegedly brutally tortured, raped in a Haweli of Pir's of Ranipur. In 2020, an 8-year-old boy in Mansehra was assaulted for two days by a cleric, who was later sentenced to 16.5 years imprisonment.

=== Child labour ===
Poverty and inflation is a big factor in people sending their children to work, or selling them to people who use them as labor or sex slaves. Child labour commonly takes the form of work in agriculture, domestic service, manufacturing and informal trades. International estimates indicate millions of children in the country are economically active, many in hazardous occupations that endanger their health and education. A 2022-24 survey found over 1.6 million children aged 5 to 17 in labour in Sindh, with roughly half engaged in hazardous work. SSDO recorded 895 reported cases of child labour in 2024.

=== Child marriage ===
Domestic violence against children and child marriage in Pakistan has also been reported.

As of 2023, at least over 18 per cent of girls and 4 per cent of boys in Pakistan were found to be married before the age of 18 and prevention of such marriages is complicated by a "dual legal regime" and by societal trends of forced conversions of girls from religious minorities. International organisations, including the United Nations, have called on Pakistan to curb forced conversion and child marriages.

=== Child trafficking ===
Children are vulnerable to trafficking for sexual exploitation, forced labour, domestic servitude and forced begging. Both domestic trafficking and cross-border exploitation have been documented, girls are often trafficked for sexual exploitation while boys are frequently reported in bonded or forced labour. SSDO documented 586 cases of child trafficking in 2024.

Notable enforcement and rescue operations have uncovered organised networks and instances where trafficked children were used in multiple forms of exploitation.

=== Overlap and under-reporting ===
Many incidents of child abuse involve overlapping harms (for example, children who are trafficked also experiencing sexual abuse or forced labour). Experts and NGOs note that official figures understate the problem because of social stigma, fear of reprisals, inconsistent reporting mechanisms and low conviction rates.

The hold of religious superstition in the society has also received blame for widespread abuse. Important social issues like pedophilia are still not widely criticized by prominent Muslim comparative theologians who find a wide following in Pakistan like Dr. Zakir Naik, who is currently living in Malaysia. One notable incident happened in early October 2024 when Dr. Zakir, while addressing a crowd in an event in Karachi, criticized a Pashtun girl and refused to address her question on widespread pedophilia in conservative communities like the one in Lakki Marwat where she hailed from and why the Ullema refused to address the problem. He later doubled down and even sought an apology from the girl and maintained that her question was contradictory.

== Laws on child abuse ==
Pakistan has enacted a number of laws to address child abuse, exploitation and neglect. The Pakistan Penal Code criminalizes a range of offences, including rape, unnatural offences and assault against minors. Amendments in recent years have expanded provisions to specifically address child sexual abuse and pornography.

The Criminal Law (Amendment) Act, 2016 introduced harsher penalties for child sexual abuse, child pornography and exposure of children to sexually explicit material. It also defined child trafficking more comprehensively. The Zainab Alert, Response and Recovery Act, 2020 established a national system for reporting and responding to child abduction and abuse cases, named after Zainab Ansari, a seven-year-old victim whose murder in Kasur sparked nationwide outrage.

At the provincial level, Sindh, Pakistan passed the Sindh Child Protection Authority Act, 2011, which created mechanisms for child protection and welfare services. Punjab and Khyber Pakhtunkhwa have also enacted child protection legislation and established child protection bureaus to deal with cases of abuse and neglect.

Pakistan is a signatory to the United Nations Convention on the Rights of the Child (CRC) and has pledged to align its domestic laws with international child protection standards.

== See also ==
- Kasur child sexual abuse scandal
- Honour killing in Pakistan
