= Pamela's Law =

Pamela's Law is legislation that was passed in 2011 by the New Jersey Legislature and signed by Governor Chris Christie that bans the sale or possession of any amount of the designer drugs commonly known as "bath salts."

== Background ==
Pamela Schmidt was a 22-year-old senior at Rutgers University who double majored in psychology and labor studies, and had just been accepted into a master's program. Her boyfriend, 22-year-old William Parisio, was a recent dropout of the same university, had bipolar disorder and drug abuse issues, had been in and out of rehab, and was living in his mother's basement in Cranford, New Jersey. The couple had interned together at SiriusXM in New York City in 2010, where Parisio had worked on Howard Stern's show.

On March 12, 2011, at 11 p.m., Schmidt arrived at the Parisio's home and watched television with Parisio and his mother. According to Schmidt's father, she was there to end their relationship. Around noon the following day, Parisio's mother discovered Schmidt's body in her basement and contacted local law enforcement. Schmidt had been beaten to death with a 12-pound dumbbell and strangled. His mother told police that Parisio was not violent but had been taking bath salts, and she insisted that was what drove him to kill his girlfriend. Parisio was charged with first-degree murder for Schmidt's death, and police suspected him of being under the influence of bath salts when he killed Schmidt.

The prosecution announced on September 2, 2011, that there were no bath salts in Parisio's system at the time of his arrest on March 14, 2011.

== Impact ==
Assemblywoman Linda Stender, one of the sponsors of Pamela's Law, called MDPV a "game of Russian roulette" because of its unknown effects on different people. The bill was introduced on May 9, 2011, amended and supplemented Title 2C of the New Jersey statutes. It warned of the easily obtainable nature of the drugs, and that they caused addiction, increased blood pressure, extreme paranoia, hallucinations and delusions, agitation, and suicidal thoughts. The bill posed criminalization of both possession and sale of the following substances found in bath salts:

- 4-methylmethcathinone (mephedrone, 4-MMC)
- 3, 4-methylenedioxypyrovalerone (MDPV)
- 3, 4-methylenedioxymethcathinone (methylone, MDMC)
- 4-methoxymethcathinone (methedrone, bk-PMMA, PMMC)
- 3-fluromethcathinone (3-FMC)
- 4-fluromethcathinone (flephedrone, 4-FMC)

Pamela's Law punishes manufacturing, distribution, dispensing, or possession with an intent to do so of an ounce or more of these substances, as a second-degree crime punishable by 5-10 years in prison and/or fines up to $150,000.

For the same actions but with any amount less than an ounce, the law punishes a person with 3-5 years in prison and/or fines up to $15,000. Regular possession of an ounce or more under Pamela's Law is punished with the same sentence, and regular possession of less than an ounce is punishable by up to 18 months in prison and/or a fine up to $10,000.

== Aftermath ==
Rutgers University established a memorial scholarship in Schmidt's name at their School of Management and Labor Relations, where she had been accepted into a master's program: the Pamela Sue Schmidt Award for Outstanding Public Service.

Parisio was held at Union County jail in Elizabeth, New Jersey until his trial. On February 17, 2014, three years after Schmidt's death, Parisio was rushed to a local hospital where he died. The local medical examiner's office cited Parisio's cause of death as cardiac dysrhythmia due to physical restraint and excited delirium. In December of that year, his mother filed suit against the county for using excessive restraint against her son and failing to realize when he stopped breathing after they obstructed his airway; she settled the suit for $200,000.

== See also ==
- List of legislation named for a person
