= Kasur child sexual abuse scandal =

Serial child sexual abuse scandal in Kasur District, Punjab, Pakistan from 2006 to 2015

Kasur District, Punjab

The Kasur child sexual abuse scandal is a series of child sexual abuses that occurred in Hussain Khanwala village in Kasur District, Punjab, Pakistan from 2006 to 2014, culminating in a major political scandal in 2015. After the discovery of hundreds of video clips showing children performing forced sex acts, various Pakistani media organizations estimated that 280 to 300 children, most of them male, were victims of sexual abuse. The scandal involved an organized crime ring that sold child pornography to porn sites, and blackmailed and extorted relatives of the victims.

The scandal caused nationwide outrage, among allegations that the Punjab police and Malik Ahmad Saeed Khan, Kasur's Member of the Provincial Assembly from the ruling Pakistan Muslim League (Nawaz), were involved in an attempted cover-up of the abuse.

It is cited by both news agencies and government departments as the largest child abuse scandal in Pakistan's history. Besides large-scale public condemnation, 50 Pakistani clergy and religious scholars issued a fatwa (religious decree) for capital punishment of the culprits, and demanded that the government console the victims and their parents.

== Abuse ==
Ashraf Javed, a staff reporter for The Nation, broke the news that a gang of 20 to 25 men had allegedly filmed up to 400 videos of child sexual abuse, involving at least 280 children of Hussain Khanwala village in Kasur. In one instance, the father of one of the victims was blackmailed into paying PKR 1.2 million to the abusers, who had threatened to release a video of his son being raped.

== Police involvement ==
=== Clash between police and protesters ===
On 8 August 2015, villagers from Hussain Khanwala and adjacent villages clashed with policemen in Dolaywala village along Deepalpur Road, after protesting the police's failure to stop the abuse ring. Police cordoned off the roads leading to the village to stop the protesters; As a police contingent tried to halt the mob led by Mobeen Ahmed, the latter pelted stones. Police teargassed and baton charged the crowd, which then damaged official vehicles on Deepalpur Road. DSPs Hassan Farooq Ghumman and Arif Rasheed; Ganda Singh SHO Akmal Kausar; policemen Akbar, Sajid, Riaz, Naeem, Ahmed Ali, Akbar Ghani and Muhammad Akmal; and 15 protesters were injured in the clash.

== Government reaction ==
=== Rana Sanaullah controversy ===
The Government of Punjab's initial statement came from Punjab Minister of Law Rana Sanaullah on 8 August 2015, who stated that a government inquiry committee concluded that no instance of child sex abuse had been reported. Sanaullah said that "reports to this effect surfaced after two parties involved in a land dispute registered 'fake cases' against each other."

=== Chief Minister's reaction ===
On 9 August 2015, the Chief Minister of Punjab Shehbaz Sharif ordered the Punjab Home Department to request Chief Justice of the Lahore High Court Manzoor Ahmed Malik to constitute a judicial inquiry into the sex abuse case. On the next day, the Chief Justice rejected the request, observing that the Punjab police was already investigating the case hence there was no need of a separate judicial commission.

== See also ==
- Child abuse in Pakistan
- Kasur
- Murder of Zainab Ansari
- Pornography in Pakistan
