= Malik Ahmad Saeed Khan =

Pakistani politician

Member of the Provincial Assembly of the Punjab
- In office 15 August 2018 – 14 January 2023
- Constituency: PP-175 Kasur-II
- In office 29 May 2013 – 31 May 2018

Personal details
- Born: 23 March 1975 (age 51) Kasur, Punjab, Pakistan
- Party: PMLN (2013-present)

Malik Ahmad Saeed Khan is a Pakistani politician who was a Member of the Provincial Assembly of the Punjab, from 2002 to 2007 and again from May 2013 to May 2018 and from August 2018 to January 2023.

== Early life and education ==
He was born on 23 March 1975 in Kasur.

He has the degree of Bachelor of Laws which he obtained in 2000 from University of the Punjab.

== Political career ==
He was elected to the Provincial Assembly of the Punjab as a candidate of Pakistan Muslim League (Q) (PML-Q) from Constituency PP-178 (Kasur-IV) in the 2002 Pakistani general election. He received 21,261 votes and defeated Chaudhry Ahmed Ali Tolo, a candidate of Pakistan Peoples Party (PPP).

He ran for the seat of the Provincial Assembly of the Punjab as a candidate of PML-Q from Constituency PP-178 (Kasur-IV) in the 2008 Pakistani general election, but was unsuccessful. He received 19,416 votes and lost the seat to Ahmad Ali Tolu, a candidate of PPP.

He was re-elected to the Provincial Assembly of the Punjab as a candidate of Pakistan Muslim League (N) (PML-N) from Constituency PP-178 (Kasur-IV) in the 2013 Pakistani general election. He received 34,335 votes and defeated an independent candidate, Shahid Masood Ali.

He was re-elected to Provincial Assembly of the Punjab as a candidate of PML-N from Constituency PP-175 (Kasur-II) in the 2018 Pakistani general election.

== Kasur pedophilia scandal ==
In 2015, Saeed was accused of attempting to protect the culprits of Kasur pedophilia ring.
