= Abuse of Kylie Freeman =

Case of child sexual abuse, prosecution, and restitution

The abuse of Kylie Freeman was a case of child sexual abuse perpetrated, recorded, and distributed by the victim's father, Kenneth Freeman.

Divorced from her mother, Kenneth Freeman abused his pre-teen daughter for 14 months in Washington and Oregon, recording and distributing it online. Kylie Freeman was in her mid-teens when she first revealed the abuse to her mother; within a year, she spoke about it on the TV series America's Most Wanted. Despite fleeing to mainland China, Kenneth Freeman was captured in 2007 and tried through early 2009. Facing federal and state charges, Freeman was convicted on multiple related counts and sentenced to 50 years imprisonment. His third wife was tried and sentenced for assisting his flight from justice.

Kylie Freeman later attended college, advocated for sexual assault victims, and been party to litigation and sentencing of perpetrators caught with recordings of her abuse.

== Background ==
Kenneth John Freeman
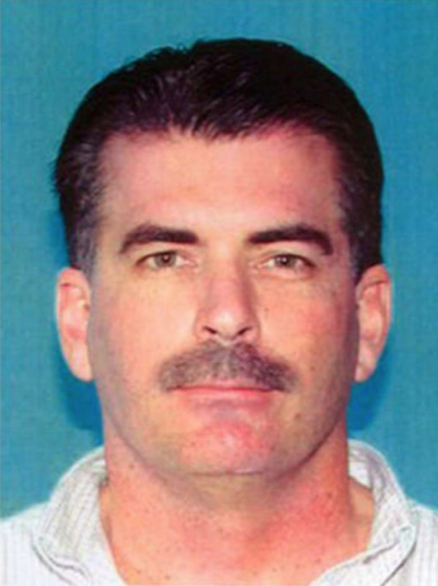
- United States Marshals Service mugshot
- Born: June 21, 1962 (age 64); Virginia, United States
- Other name: Ken Freeman
- Occupation: Law enforcement officer
- Employers: Hanford Nuclear Site; Hanford, Washington; Benton Co., Washington
- Criminal charges: Child sexual abuse; Child pornography
- Criminal penalty: 50 years imprisonment
- Criminal status: Imprisoned until December 5, 2049 (23 years' time)
- Spouses: Gaye Leah Metz (m. 1988; div. 1993); Melissa L. Moscatelli (m. 1994; div. 1999); Maleka May Freeman (m. 2005; div. 2008)
- Children: Kylie Freeman (born 1989 or 1990)

Kenneth John Freeman was born on June 21, 1962, in Virginia. Also called Ken Freeman, he is a former Hanford nuclear plant guard; a former patrol officer for Hanford, Washington; and a former sheriff's office reserve deputy in Benton County, Washington. In 2007, the US Marshals Service reported his height at 6 feet 2 inches (1.88 m), and weight as 250 pounds (110 kg). In 2008, the Houston Chronicle called him a "computer adviser" and bodybuilder.

After marrying Gaye Leah Metz in 1988, they had a daughter—Kylie Freeman—in 1989 or 1990. Gaye divorced Kenneth Freeman in April 1993. In 1994, Freeman married Melissa L. Moscatelli, and they divorced in October 1999.

== Sexual abuse ==
Beginning in 2000 when she was ten years old, Kylie Freeman was sexually abused by her father; she was "forced […] to dress up like a hooker and say dirty words to a video camera and was bound by ropes and repeatedly raped." These crimes were recorded as both photos and videos that were posted online as the "Vicky series" (which, as of June 2010, were the all-time most viewed images of child pornography). This lasted for 14 months until Kylie Freeman's "spirit was broken".

In November 2005, by which time teenaged Kylie Freeman was suicidal, a family viewing of Forrest Gump triggered her memories of the abuse, which she then revealed to her mother. The subsequent police investigation uncovered some Vicky-series material on Kylie's own computer, believed to have been put there by her father. A year later, she appeared on the December 19, 2006, episode of America's Most Wanted and talked about what her father had perpetrated, placing the previously "provincial affair" in the national spotlight. With this exposure, the National Center for Missing & Exploited Children was able to link the Vicky series to the victim and perpetrator.

== Capture of Kenneth Freeman ==
Kenneth Freeman fleeing

In early 2006, Kenneth Freeman was living in Seattle, after his release from jail on a bail bond of US$50,000 (equivalent to about $80,000 in 2025). He was scheduled for trial in Benton County, Washington, for "three counts of first-degree rape of a child" on March 24, 2006. That day, the former law-enforcer instead fled to mainland China to avoid prosecution, and was subsequently placed on the most wanted lists of the United States Marshals Service and Immigration and Customs Enforcement (ICE). A reward of $25,000 (equivalent to about $40,000 in 2025) was offered by the Marshals "for information directly leading to his arrest." While in China, Freeman wrote a 400-page autobiography that included confessions to his crimes.

Found living in Suzhou, authorities waited to arrest Freeman until he transited to Hong Kong, because the US had no extradition treaty with the government of China, but did with the government of Hong Kong. On the evening of May 1, 2007, Freeman was caught at the Lok Ma Chau Control Point. He injured himself and four local police with the ensuing fight. Four months later, he agreed to extradition, and returned to the United States on October 18, 2007.

=== Prosecution ===
In the United States District Court for the Eastern District of Washington, Kenneth Freeman was tried under Judge Lonny R. Suko on one federal charge of producing child pornography in Washington, and two Oregonian charges: possessing child pornography and "interstate transportation of a minor for purposes of engaging in unlawful sexual activities." Freeman pled guilty to all three charges in December 2008.

I've been molested and raped. I've been dressed up like a hooker and given dirty lines to say in front of a camera. […] When I was told how many people have viewed these images and videos, I thought my pulse would stop. Thinking about all those sick perverts viewing my body being ravaged and hurt like that makes me feel like I'm raped by each and every one of them.

— Kylie Freeman's 2009
victim impact statement

As part of a cross-jurisdictional plea bargain, Freeman was sentenced on March 25, 2009, to 50 years imprisonment; Judge Suko told Freeman that if the felon was ever released from prison, he would be aged in his mid-80s. Two hours later, at the Spokane County Superior Court, Freeman was also sentenced to 20 concurrent years of imprisonment for the 2006 Benton County charges. He is forbidden from profiting off his life story, and is subject to a lifetime restraining order prohibiting any contact with his daughter. As of November 2025, he was prisoner number 12163-085, imprisoned at the Federal Correctional Institution, Marion with a release date of December 5, 2049 (23 years' time); he is parolable after serving 42 years of his sentence.

=== Accessory prosecution ===
While he was a fugitive in China, Kenneth Freeman's third wife (Maleka May Freeman, born 1969/1970, married March 2005) traveled to China multiple times to meet with her husband, and lied to US federal authorities about knowing his whereabouts. Upon returning to the US from China, she was arrested by ICE the day after Freeman was caught in Hong Kong. She ultimately pled guilty to making false statements and aiding and abetting her husband's flight from custody. On November 29, 2007, she was sentenced to six months house arrest, 240 hours of community service, and three years probation. The Freemans divorced in April 2008.

== Kylie Freeman ==
According to The Spokesman-Review, during the search, trial, and conviction of her father, Kylie Freeman had "not shied away from being publicly identified." She became a public advocate for sexual assault victims by sharing her story and teaching that they're not alone in their struggles. By March 2009, she was a freshman at college.

=== Restitution ===
In November 2007, Joseph Kennedy (born 1976/1977) was found with a laptop containing "thousands of images of child pornography", including 48 of Freeman. At Kennedy's February 2010 sentencing, he was ordered by Judge Richard A. Jones to pay Freeman restitution of $227,571.10 (equivalent to $335,991 in 2025) as allowed by the "Mandatory Restitution for Sex Crimes" section of the Violence Against Women Act. This restitution order was overturned by the United States Court of Appeals for the Ninth Circuit in 2011, but after Freeman presented additional information to the court as part of Kennedy's resentencing, Jones ordered a new restitution order of $4,545.08 (equivalent to $6,374 in 2025)—figured as Kennedy was one of 292 verified defendants accused of or sentenced for downloading images of Freeman, and her total losses as of 2012 were calculated at $1,327,166.24 (equivalent to $1,861,188 in 2025).

In June 2010, Freeman gave a victim impact statement in the trial of John Joseph Mulligan, a Sacramento, California, man who pled guilty to downloading the Vicky series. As of January 2014, media of Freeman's abuse had been evidence in 3200 US criminal cases, and she had received approximately $800,000 in restitution (equivalent to about $1.1M in 2025). In June 2016, she filed suit against J. Lee Anderson III of Macon, Georgia, who had been convicted in 2009 of downloading Vicky series media. Anderson’s was her fifth such lawsuit against downloaders; she sought $150,000 (equivalent to $201,227 in 2025).

== See also ==
- Amy, Vicky, and Andy Child Pornography Victim Assistance Act of 2018 – United States federal law concerning restitution to CSAM victims
