= Amy, Vicky, and Andy Child Pornography Victim Assistance Act of 2018 =

United States federal law concerning restitution to CSAM victims

The Amy, Vicky, and Andy Child Pornography Victim Assistance Act of 2018 (AVAA) (Pub. L. 115–299 (text) (PDF)) is a United States federal law that changes how federal courts determine the amount of restitution victims of child pornography offenses receive.

The AVAA responds to the United States Supreme Court's call on Congress to clarify the meaning of the restitution statute. It aims to create an effective system suited for the unique nature of child pornography crimes. It is codified in various sections of Title 18 and Title 34 of the United States Code. The primary section is 18 U.S.C. § 2259. The act became law on December 7, 2018.

== Provisions ==
The AVAA adds four key protections for victims of child pornography (also known as Child Sex Abuse Material, or CSAM) offenses:

- It sets a floor of $3,000 in restitution that courts must order defendants to pay to victims, representing the defendant's relative role in the causal process that underlies the victim's losses.
- It creates a Child Pornography Victims Reserve Fund within the federal Crime Victims Fund using assessments from defendants convicted of child pornography offenses and set-aside funds. Victims of child pornography trafficking are entitled to receive a one-time payment of $35,000 from this fund instead of fighting for restitution if they so choose. The court can assess the defendant for up to $17,000, $35,000, or $50,000, depending on the type of child pornography crime.
- It clarifies that the "full amount of the victim's losses" for trafficking in child pornography cases includes any costs incurred, or reasonably projected to be incurred in the future, as a proximate result of all the trafficking in child pornography offenses that involve the same victim. This expands what counts as "total losses," and therefore increases the defendant's restitution amount for the defendant's relative role, as discussed above.
- It allows child pornography victims to enjoy equal rights with criminal defendants to review the child pornography in question in the case. This access will help victims prepare expert testimony and identify victims.

== Background ==
=== Mandatory Victim Restitution Act ===
The Mandatory Victim Restitution Act of 1996, codified in part at 18 U.S.C. § 3363A, requires courts to order that a defendant pay a victim restitution in certain cases, such as those that involve crimes of violence or pecuniary loss to the victim. Child pornography cases are included in this mandate, as codified in 18 U.S.C. § 2259. Specifically, defendants convicted of sexual exploitation or other child abuse crimes must pay the victim the "full amount of the victim's losses."

=== Paroline v. United States ===
In 2014, the Supreme Court in Paroline v. United States analyzed the meaning of the "full amount of the victim's losses" definition in the then-current 1996 version of 18 U.S.C. § 2259(b). The defendant in the case was convicted of possessing child pornography featuring the victim, and the victim was attempting to recover restitution. Economist Stan V. Smith, Ph.D., had calculated the economics losses for the plaintiff in the case. The central question was the appropriate causation standard to apply. The majority highlighted that the final category of victim's losses read, "any other losses suffered by the victim as a proximate result of the offense." The majority then applied this language to all victim losses, rather than only the last category, to find an explicit requirement of proximate cause. Thus, according to the majority, to recover restitution, a victim must prove both elements of proximate cause: causation in fact (the former event caused the latter) and proximate cause (sufficient connection to the result).

The majority found proximate cause easily: "[T]he victim’s costs of treatment and lost income resulting from the trauma of knowing that images of her abuse are being viewed over and over" are direct and foreseeable results of child pornography crimes, including the defendant’s possession crime.

However, the majority did not find causation in fact. The traditional causation standard is but-for causation, which would lead to no losses being a proximate cause of the defendant's conduct. The victim and the government advocated for applying an aggregate causation standard for causation in fact, derived from tort law, which finds causation in fact when a defendant's conduct, combined with conduct by other persons, is "more than sufficient to cause the harm." The majority chose neither. Rather, the majority held that where losses can be shown but it is impossible to trace a particular amount of the losses to the individual defendant, "a court applying § 2259 should order restitution in an amount that comports with the defendant's relative role in the causal process that underlies the victim's general losses."

Chief Justice Roberts and Justice Sotomayor wrote separate dissents, both criticizing the statute and calling on Congress to amend it. Justice Sotomayor's dissent argued for applying the aggregate causation standard and holding the defendant liable for all of the victim's losses for harm from all defendants. At the end, she suggested that "Congress might amend the statute . . . to include the term 'aggregate causation.'" She also suggested that Congress might enact minimum restitution amounts, such as the statutorily imposed $150,000 minimum civil remedy for child pornography victims under 18 U.S.C. § 2255.

=== Aftermath of Paroline ===
Critics of the Paroline opinion argued that it muddied restitution decisions in child pornography cases throughout the country due to a lack of guidance on how to determine how much restitution particular possessor defendants owed particular victims. Many lower courts found that the majority’s rules that the amount should not be severe, token, or nominal, and should be reasonable and circumscribed, were not useful in practice. Some examples of lower court cases trying to apply the Paroline factors are below.

In United States v. Crisostomi, a district court judge in Rhode Island explained:

In this Court’s opinion, while some of the Paroline factors are determinable with some precision, a number of other factors are virtually unknown and unknowable, regardless of the detail available in the record. For example, how is a district judge to make a 'reliable estimate of the broader number of offenses involved” when even the U.S. Supreme Court admits parenthetically that “most of whom will, of course, never be caught, or convicted?' It appears to this Court that some of the factors the Supreme Court suggests be considered are at best difficult, and at worst impossible to calculate in this case as in most similar cases.

In United States v. Reynolds, a district court judge in the Eastern District of Michigan stated:

Paroline suggests that district courts, ‘as a starting point, determine the amount of the victim’s losses caused by the continuing traffic in the victim’s images' . . . . [T]he Court believes . . . it is simply not possible for the Government to show, ‘as a starting point,’ the amount of losses caused by the ‘continuing trafficking’ in Cindy and Vicky’s images. This theoretical starting point will simply not exist in many cases.

In United States v. Galan, the Ninth Circuit commented:

[T]his area, in which Congress has adopted a scheme that at least approaches the limits of fair adjudication despite attempts by the courts to avoid caprice, cries out for a congressional solution.

In United States v. Austin, a district court judge in Nevada mentioned:

Some courts have difficulty determining a starting point for the losses caused by the “continuing trafficking” of images. . . . Paroline is of limited use because no logical starting point can be determined.

In United States v. Shultz, a district court judge in Massachusetts discussed the potential for Congress to improve consistency in the restitution system:

Congress is currently considering a[sic] enacting a law that would provide for a graduated system of restitution for victims of child pornography beginning with a minimum amount of $25,000 for possession. If enacted, this law would eliminate much of the present variability in victim restitution awards.

These cases, along with Justice Sotomayor's dissent in Paroline, served as a call to action for Congress. Congress' response will be explored in the legislative history section below.

=== Name of the Act ===
The AVAA is named after three victims of some of the most widely distributed child pornography series in the world. All three victims have expressed their support for the bill in statements.

== Legislative history ==
=== Timeline ===
Although the AVAA became law four years after Paroline, Congress had been trying to address the courts' requests for years. Senator Hatch, who introduced the AVAA, tried to get similar legislation passed two times before the AVAA succeeded. A timeline for all three bills is below.

| Act | Date | Action | Notes |
|---|---|---|---|
| AVA of 2014 | May 7, 2014 | AVA of 2014 (S. 2301) introduced in the Senate | Introductory remarks by Senator Hatch |
| | June 26, 2014 | Companion bill (H.R. 4981) introduced in the House and referred to the House Committee on the Judiciary | |
| | July 21, 2014 | H.R. 4981 referred to the House Subcommittee on Crime, Terrorism, Homeland Security, and Investigations | |
| AVA of 2015 | January 28, 2015 | AVA of 2015 (S. 295) introduced in the Senate | |
| | | Companion bill (H.R. 595) introduced in the House and referred to the House Committee on the Judiciary | |
| | February 5, 2015 | Hearing on S. 295 in the Senate Judiciary Committee | Statements by Senators Hatch and Feinstein |
| | February 11, 2015 | S. 295 passed in the Senate | Statements by Senators Grassley, Hatch, and Schumer |
| | February 12, 2015 | S. 295 sent to and received in the House; referred to the House Committee on the Judiciary | |
| | March 17, 2015 | H.R. 595 referred to House Subcommittee on Crime, Terrorism, Homeland Security, and Investigations | |
| | March 19, 2015 | Hearing on H.R. 595 in the House Judiciary Subcommittee on Crime, Terrorism, Homeland Security, and Investigations | Statements by various interested parties |
| AVAA of 2018 | November 16, 2017 | Introduced as AVAA of 2017 (S. 2152) in the Senate; referred to the Senate Judiciary Committee | |
| | December 14, 2017 | Hearing on S. 2152 in the Senate Judiciary Committee | Statement by Senator Hatch |
| | January 24, 2018 | S. 2152 passed the Senate with minor amendments and sent to the House | |
| | January 25, 2018 | S. 2152 referred to the House Committee on the Judiciary; referred to the House Subcommittee on Crime, terrorism, Homeland Security, and Investigations | |
| | February 7, 2018 | Companion bill (H.R. 4963) introduced in the House; referred to the House Committee on the Judiciary | |
| | September 20, 2018 | Companion bill #2 (H.R. 6845) introduced in the House; referred to the House Committee on the Judiciary | H.R. 6845 matched the amendments made to S. 2152 in the House |
| | September 28, 2018 | S. 2152 considered and passed the House with amendments | |
| | November 15, 2018 | Senate agreed to House amendments on S. 2152 | |
| | December 7, 2018 | President Trump signed S. 2152; became Public Law 115-299 | Senator Hatch sent statement for the record to President Trump on December 3, 2018 |

=== Legislative intent ===
The AVA of 2014 was introduced in direct response to Paroline. Senator Hatch's introductory remarks discuss Paroline and emphasize the bill's intent to solve the Court's question of who bears the burden of seeking out all other defendants for restitution. The AVA of 2014 would shift the burden to the defendants, who may have to pay all of the victim's losses and then sue others who have harmed the victim to spread out the costs. The legislation justifies this shift by invoking joint and several liability, as Justice Sotomayor argues for in her Paroline dissent. The AVA of 2014 would also create restitution floors of $250,000 for child pornography production offenses, $150,000 for distribution offenses, and $25,000 for possession offenses.

Many elements of the legislation changed between the first version and the final bill that became law in 2018. There is no longer language about joint and several liability or burden shifting. The floor for all child pornography offenses is $3,000. The goal remains to change the law to accommodate the "unique" ways child pornography crimes harm victims over and over again, but the purpose has gone from making sure victims are "fully compensated for all the harms resulting from each and every perpetrator who contributes to their anguish" to dropping "each and" to dropping "fully."

The following statements and other information provide context for why these amendments may have occurred:

- The original purpose of the AVA of 2014 (S. 2301) as proposed by Senator Hatch had three parts:
  First, it considers a victim’s total losses, including from individuals who may not have yet been identified. This step reflects the unique nature of child pornography and its ongoing impact on its victims. Secondly, the bill requires real and timely restitution and gives judges options for making that happen. Third, it allows defendants who have contributed to the same victim’s losses to spread the cost of restitution among themselves.
- Representatives talked about the House companion bill (H.R. 4981) as giving victims "full protection and compensation." However, the bill did not pass the Senate or the House.
- In a statement before the Senate Judiciary Committee on February 5, 2015, for the AVA of 2015 (S. 295), Senator Hatch explained that no restitution was ordered at all in 75 percent of child pornography cases, and that this bill would prevent victims from "the never-ending burden of chasing defendants across the country for the rest of [their lives] only to recover next to nothing."
- Senators Feinstein and Grassley described the bill's solution as joint and several liability and Senator Grassley said it would overturn the Supreme Court.
- Various professors and practitioners expressed a want for a fixed compensation without litigation option in a hearing on the House companion bill for the AVA of 2015 (H.R. 595). Jill Steinberg, the National Coordinator for Child Exploitation Prevention and Interdiction at the United States Department of Justice, also questioned whether the joint and several liability standard would violate the Eighth Amendment and expressed concerns that this issue would delay restitution because of the need to litigate constitutional questions. The bill died in committee in the House after this hearing.
- About two and a half years later, when Senator Hatch spoke in a Senate Judiciary Hearing about the AVAA, he focused on the opportunity for the victims to choose a one-time fixed compensation amount of $35,000. He did not mention "full" recovery or restitution.
- A newspaper editorial described the AVAA as a "good compromise between previous Senate and House proposals."
- Senator Hatch mentioned in his statement for the record for President Trump that the $3,000 floor is "reasonable, fair, and equitable" and was determined by "considering a range of options with a specific goal of fully compensating victims of child pornography in a swift and just manner." He continued by saying the amount fit with Congress' goal of proportionality in sentencing because $3,000 "reflects the amount of restitution currently being sought and ordered in district courts throughout the country." A United States Sentencing Commission report showed that $3,000 was the mean amount of payment ordered for child pornography crimes.

== Potential effects ==
=== Future changes ===
The passage of the AVAA prompted discussions of what will come next to help protect victims of child pornography offenses and other offenses. Paul G. Cassell and James M. Marsh wrote a law review article that called the AVAA a "modest but useful step" towards a system that prioritizes victims' interests. The authors discussed the low floor of $3,000 and encouraged district court judges to use it as "simply a floor" and give larger awards. The authors also proposed that the AVAA may set a precedent for expanding restitution of victims in the future.

=== Case law ===
A few cases have discussed or applied the amended 18 U.S.C. § 2259 since it became law.

==== United States v. Hollman ====
In Hollman, the magistrate judge discusses the requirement that the government present evidence of the total loss of the victim by showing the losses under 18 U.S.C. § 2259(c)(2)(A)-(F) (for example, medical services, lost income, therapy, or any other relevant losses incurred by the victim). The judge determines that the amended statute does not solve the problem of a situation in which the government cannot prove the total losses of the victim. The amended statute requires calculating the total loss before the $3,000 floor comes into play, so no restitution can be ordered if they government does not show total losses. The district court judge rejected the recommendation to gather more evidence, but agreed with the magistrate judge's logic.

The magistrate judge mentions that the victim can still get relief through the one-time $35,000 compensation from the Child Pornography Victims Reserve.

==== United States v. Penaloza ====
The defendant in Penaloza was convicted of possession of child pornography. The district court judge ordered $54,000 in restitution, split among eight victims. The judge stated, "restitution is mandatory pursuant to 18 U.S.C. § 2259 in the full amount of the victims' losses attributable to Defendant’s activities."

If split equally, each victim recovered $6,750, which is over double the $3,000 floor.

==== United States v. Block ====
The government in Block requested $47,000 for six victims against a defendant convicted of receipt of child pornography. The district court judge did not order restitution because there was no evidence that the defendant possessed images of the particular victims. The judge included a footnote that acknowledged the AVAA amending 18 U.S.C. § 2259 but did not apply it because it did not order restitution. The judge did not discuss the possibility of the victim recovering $35,000 from the Child Pornography Victims Reserve or the new evidence rules about reviewing the images in question.

== See also ==
- Abuse of Kylie Freeman – Case of child sexual abuse, prosecution, and restitution
- Child pornography laws in the United States
- Paroline v. United States – 2014 United States Supreme Court case
- Restitution – Legal remedy taking away a benefit wrongfully obtained
