= Murder of Zainab Ansari =

2018 rape and murder case in Kasur, Punjab, Pakistan

Zainab Ansari
- زینب انصاری
- Ansari in 2017
- Born: Zainab Amin Ansari; 18 August 2010; Kasur, Punjab, Pakistan
- Disappeared: 4 January 2018 (aged 7); Kasur, Punjab, Pakistan
- Cause of death: Homicide via strangulation
- Body discovered: 9 January 2018 near Lahore, Punjab, Pakistan
- Known for: Victim of serial child rape and murder; Namesake of the Zainab Alert Bill (posthumous)

Imran Ali

Zainab Amin Ansari (Urdu: زینب امین انصاری; c. 2010 – January 2018) was a seven-year-old Pakistani girl who was abducted in her hometown of Kasur, Punjab while she was on her way to Quran recitation classes on 4 January 2018. Her body was found discarded five days later within a garbage disposal site near the city of Lahore on 9 January 2018; an autopsy report disclosed that she had been extensively raped and tortured before being strangled to death. Her rapist and murderer, 24-year-old Imran Ali, was arrested and identified as a serial killer responsible for at least seven previous rapes and murders of prepubescent girls in the region. Her case was taken up by lawyer Aftab Ahmed Bajwa, assisted by another lawyer Hamza Khalid Farani.

Ansari's murder incited widespread protests and outrage throughout Pakistan, and ultimately led to the passage of Pakistan's first national child safety law, known as the Zainab Alert Bill (similar to the AMBER Alert system in the United States). The bill directs that any individual found guilty of child abuse faces a minimum mandatory sentence of life imprisonment and also stipulates instigating legal action against any law enforcement officials who cause any unnecessary delay in investigating such cases within two hours of a child being reported as missing.

== Event ==
The incident occurred when Ansari's parents were in Saudi Arabia to perform Umrah, while she was temporarily living with her uncle. On 4 January 2018, she went missing while on her way to a Quran tuition class near her home. Her uncle, Muhammad Adnan, lodged a complaint with the Kasur District police office. CCTV video footage discovered by Ansari's family without any aid from local authorities showed her accompanied by an unknown bearded man in white clothes and a jacket, holding her hand and walking on Peerowala Road in Kasur. Her body was later discovered at a garbage disposal site on Shahbaz Khan Road on 9 January 2018. An autopsy report confirmed that she had been raped, sodomised and tortured before being strangled to death.

=== Protests ===
Prior to the rape and murder of Ansari, the province of Punjab had seen several pedophilia scandals, with local law enforcement accused of inaction and/or cover-up efforts. Following Ansari's murder, protests were held in many major cities across Pakistan, including the capital of Islamabad, which saw candlelight vigils, vehicles burned, roads blockaded and several clashes between protestors and police; two people were killed after they had broken into a police station. Four policemen who allegedly opened fire at protesters in Kasur were reportedly arrested and under investigation.

== Reactions ==
The Chief Minister Shehbaz Sharif, later the Prime Minister of Pakistan, tweeted:

"Deeply pained about brutal murder of an 8-year-old girl in a child molestation case. Those societies that cannot protect its children are eternally condemned. Not going to rest till the perpetrators of this dastardly act are apprehended & given severest possible punishment under the law."

Nobel Peace Prize laureate Malala Yousafzai wrote on Twitter: "This has to stop. [Government] and the concerned authorities must take action."

Imran Khan tweeted: "The condemnable & horrific rape & murder of little Zainab exposes once again how vulnerable our children are in our society."

Islamic cleric Muhammad Tahir-ul-Qadri, a political rival of the former ruling Pakistan Muslim League party, "demanded the local government be replaced, saying it has 'no right to remain in power after the killing of Zainab Ansari'".

Kiran Naz, a Samaa TV news anchor, hosted a 10 January bulletin with her young daughter on her lap as an act of protest. At the Sindh Assembly, artist celebrities Ayesha Omer, Nadia Hussain, Faysal Qureshi and others met on 12 January with Deputy Speaker Shehla Raza, demanding laws and justice to prevent such tragedies in the future. Mahira Khan, Ali Zafar, Imran Abbas, Mawra Hocane, and Saba Qamar, as well as former cricket players Wasim Akram and Shoaib Akhtar tweeted about the incident, condemning the brutal rape and murder, while also trending the hashtag #JusticeforZainab.

== Arrest ==
Shehbaz Sharif announced the arrest of a suspect, Imran Ali, in a press conference on 23 January 2018. He confirmed that polygraph tests and the DNA of the suspect matched with the samples of at least eight minor girls, including Ansari, who were raped and murdered within the same neighbourhood. Ali was a 24-year-old mechanic who lived in Ansari's neighbourhood, and further investigations disclosed that he had even taken part in the protests following the discovery of Ansari's body. Police also found the jacket worn by the suspect, which was seen in the CCTV footage showing Ansari just before she disappeared. Ali eventually confessed to having committed the serial rapes and murders.

=== Sentencing and execution ===
On 17 February 2018, an anti-terrorism court in Lahore Central Jail found Ali guilty for the rape and murder of Ansari and twelve other underage girls. The court handed him four counts of the death penalty, one life term, a seven-year jail term and ₨3,200,000 in fines. He was executed by hanging on 17 October 2018 at 05:30 local time.

== Zainab Alert Bill ==
In 2020, the Parliament of Pakistan passed the Zainab Alert, Response and Recovery Act, 2019, colloquially known as the Zainab Alert Bill, named after Ansari. The bill outlines various systems designed to improve the country's responses to missing child cases.

== See also ==
- Kasur child sexual abuse scandal
- Rape in Pakistan
- List of serial killers by country
