= Jarod's Law =

School safety legislation in Ohio, United States

House Bill 203

126th Ohio General Assembly
- Long title: To amend sections 3707.26 and 4736.01 and to enact sections 117.102, 3313.473, 3314.15, and 3701.93, 3701.931, 3701.932, 3701.933, 3701.934, 3701.935, and 3701.936 of the Revised Code with respect to inspections of public and nonpublic school buildings by boards of health, to require the Director of Health to establish the School Health and Safety Network to coordinate school inspections, and to include school safety and sanitary inspections within the practice of environmental health for registered sanitarians.
- Citation: 2005 Bill Text OH H.B. 203
- Territorial extent: State of Ohio
- Commenced: March 21, 2006

Legislative history
- Bill title: Jarod's Law
- Introduced by: Tom Raga

Summary
- Enhancing school inspection standards to remedy health and safety concerns.
- Status: Repealed

Jarod's Law was an Ohio law written in response to the accidental death of a 6-year-old elementary school student in Lebanon, Ohio, United States. The law was passed in 2005 but was repealed 4 years later after complaints that the regulations proved too costly for schools to enact as written.

== Background ==
On December 19, 2003, 6-year-old Jarod Bennett was attending an after-school YMCA program at Louisa Wright Elementary School when a 290-pound folded cafeteria table fell on top of him. Jarod died minutes later in his mother's arms. The subsequent investigation revealed that the tables were known to be dangerous but nevertheless used in schools across the state. Jarod's Law, passed in late 2005, required more inclusive safety inspections of schools.

After their son's death, Bennett's parents advocated for updates in school safety and created House Bill 203, known as "Jarod's Law," which would expand mandatory safety regulations for schools in a host of categories. The law's primary sponsor was state representative Tom Raga.

== Impact ==
Jarod's Law went into effect on October 1, 2009 and mandated for all public and private schools:

- Annual school inspections by the Ohio State Board of Health to identify safety concerns
- Publicly available inspection reports for schools
- Mandatory written plans to remedy noncompliant items deemed "hazardous to occupants"
- Review of school's remediation plans to ensure compliance
- Auditing and review by the state's auditor's office
- Creation of the School Health and Safety Network in Ohio
- Chief administrator cooperation with School Health and Safety Networks, particularly with providing access to the premises and school records

School officials planned to review safety and health concerns in areas like plumbing, fire safety, water temperature in school sinks, storage, playground mulch, and indoor air quality.

A few years after the law's enactment, chool officials and state representatives complained that the benefits of the law outweighed the costs to implement the law's requirements. In 2009, it was repealed in response to the complaints, as the regulations proved too onerous for most school districts. Local health departments stated that despite the repeal, schools made strides in safety because the regulations induced safety review in Ohio schools.

== Memorial ==
Jarod Park in Lebanon has been named in honor of Jarod Bennett. It is located near the corner of S.R. 48 and Cook Road near the school where he was killed.
