= List of legislation named for a place =

This is a list of legislation named for a place, typically the place in which it was passed.

Medieval legislation was traditionally named, in particular, after the place where it was passed. (Medieval governments were itinerant or peripatetic before the end of the fourteenth century). Such popular titles were used to cite legislation in the thirteenth and fourteenth centuries. (The citation of legislation by session did not begin until the end of the fourteenth century; and citation by short titles authorised by statute did not begin until the 1840s.)

== United Kingdom and predecessor states ==
The following Acts are named after the place where they were passed:

- Constitutions of Clarendon 1164
- Assize of Clarendon 1166
- Assize of Northampton 1176
- Statute of Merton 1235
- Provisions of Oxford 1258
- Statute of Kenilworth 1266 (51 & 52 Hen 3) (or Dictum de Kenilworth)
- Statute of Marlborough 1267 (at the time known as the Statute of Marlbridge)
- Statute of Westminster I 1275
- Statute of Gloucester 1278 (6 Edw 1)
- Statute of Rutland 1282 (10 Edw 1)
- Statute of Acton Burnell 1283 (11 Edw 1)
- Statute of Rhuddlan 1284 (or the Statute of Wales)
- Statute of Westminster II 1285
- Statute of Winchester 1285
- Statute of Exeter 1285 or 1286 (13 or 14 Edw 1)
- Statute of Westminster III 1290
- Statute of Stamford 1309
- Statute of Lincoln 1316 (12 Edw 2) (or the Statute of Lincoln de vice-comitibus or the Statute of Sheriffs)
- Statute of Carlisle (15 Edw 2)
- Statute of York 1318
- Statute of Westminster IV 1320
- Statute of Northampton 1328 (2 Edw 3)
- Statute of Kilkenny 1367
- Second Statute of Northampton (1380)
- Statute of Westminster 1931

The following Act is not named after the place where it was passed:

- Isle of Man Act 1958
- Island of Rockall Act 1972
- Isle of Man Act 1979

== See also ==
- List of short titles
- List of legislation named for a person
- Citation of United Kingdom legislation
