= Mariana Ferrer =

Brazilian activist and lawyer

Mariana Ferrer is a Brazilian lawyer and activist, better known for her campaign for the rights of victims of sexual assault in Brazil.

Mariana Ferrer worked as a model and influencer in 2018, when she reported being sexually assaulted in a Brazilian club. The subsequent trial caused widespread outrage in Brazil, due to Ferrer being humiliated by the defense lawyer. The verdict was vacated in 2026 by the Brazilian Supreme Court. As part of the repercussion, the Mariana Ferrer law was created to protect victims of sexual assault from revitimization by the state. Ferrer graduated from law school in 2025, presenting a thesis on her own trial, and now works defending sexual assault victims.

== Sexual Assault and trial ==
Mariana Ferrer reported being roofied and sexually assaulted in a club in the Brazilian city of Florianopolis, Cafe de la Musique, in December 2018. After the assault, Ferrer started documenting the reporting process in her Instagram account.

In July 2019, the Santa Catarina Public Prosecutor's Office filed charges against businessman André de Camargo Aranha. Aranha initially claimed never to have had physical contact with the model, but forensic examinations confirmed sexual intercourse and a ruptured hymen, and Aranha's semen was found on the victim's underwear.

=== Humiliation during Trial ===
The trial concluded in September 2020 when the defendant was acquitted by Judge Rudson Marcos at the prosecutor's request. The prosecutor claimed it was impossible to prove beyond a reasonable doubt that the victim was actually in a vulnerable state, as the toxicology report was inconclusive. Witnesses who interacted with Ferrer gave conflicting accounts: some claimed she appeared intoxicated or impaired, while others believed she was acting normally. The prosecutor argued that he could not prove Aranha was aware the victim had been drugged, and it was possible he did not realize she was unable to consent.

During the trial hearing, the defene lawyer, Cláudio Gastão da Rosa Filho, questioned the victim about photos posted on her social media and during her work as a model. While showing the photos, the lawyer remarked, "Very beautiful, by the way"; Mariana subsequently criticized him for the comment: "You said 'very beautiful, by the way,' didn't you? That constitutes psychological harassment against me. You are old enough to be my father. You need to stick to the facts." Cláudio then replied, "I would never have a daughter like you. Thank God. And I also pray to God that my son never meets a woman like you."

The lawyer also claimed that Mariana's only goal with the case was to stir up controversy and gain media attention: "She doesn't want to clarify anything. She doesn't want this to end. She wants to enjoy the attention on Instagram. She lives off this—off this charade she's concocted." At another point, Cláudio Gastão da Rosa Filho used images from Mariana Ferrer's modeling career, claiming she was striking "gynecological poses." Gastão also mocked Ferrer when she started to cry: "That is no explanation. It's no use coming here with that feigned, fake crying and those crocodile tears." At that moment, the judge allowed Mariana a moment to compose herself and admonished the lawyer to maintain a "proper standard of conduct."

=== Repercussion in Brazilian media ===
The case regained public attention in November 2020 following a report by the news outlet The Intercept Brasil, which released footage from the hearing where Ferrer was humiliated by the defense lawyer. In the report, journalist Schirlei Alves used the term "negligent rape" to summarize the prosecutor's thesis. Lawyer Bárbara Madruga da Cunha, writing a legal analysis of the case, also examines the term "negligent rape", used in the report, stating: "Clearly, the prosecutor did not use that specific term, but, in essence, that is what he meant. Unable to dispute the occurrence of sexual intercourse—which was proven by forensic reports—the Public Prosecutor's Office argued that Aranha was unaware Mariana was unconscious, as he believed at the time that she was engaging in sexual acts of her own free will and in full possession of her faculties. In other words, the prosecutor maintained that the rape was negligent, given that André had no intent to commit rape." She also pointed out the dangerous precedent such a decision could pose in Brazilian legislation.

The public outcry—fueled particularly by the video published by *The Intercept Brasil*, which showed the judge allowing the victim to be subjected to attacks by the defendant's lawyer during the trial—prompted the National Council of Justice (CNJ) to open disciplinary proceedings against Judge Rudson Marcos. On 14 November 2023, the plenary of the National Council of Justice issued him a formal warning. Judge Rudson Marcos started a series of lawsuits against journalist Schirlei Alves, a cartoonist who depicted the case, and over 200 social media users who used the hashtag #negligentrape to discuss the case, including celebrities Anitta, Ana Hickmann and Ivete Sangalo. Congresswoman Luciana Genro, who was sued for 30,000 reais, called this was "an orchestrated action against people's legitimate right to protest the humiliation to which Mari Ferrer was subjected" and that criminalizing opinions violated freedom of expression. The legal news portal Migalhas noted that most of the lawsuits were filed in special civil courts, where plaintiffs do not face liability for legal fees or costs if they lose the case.

Legal scholars criticized the case due to the manner in which the trial was conducted by the judge and the prosecutor. Jurist Lenio Streck stated that the judge and prosecutor lacked impartiality in the case: "The defendant's lawyer humiliated the victim. It was a form of moral rape. And, by witnessing all of that and doing nothing, the judge and prosecutor became compromised. Because, by failing to stop the victim's ordeal, they tacitly agreed with it—likely because they had already formed their 'independent conviction' that the defendant should be acquitted. Isn't the judge responsible for the hearing, after all? Thus, the verdict should never have been issued by that judge. Nor should the arguments have been made by the prosecutor. It is as simple as that."

Victória-Amalia de Sulocki, a professor of Criminal Law and Criminal Procedural Law at PUC-Rio, said that Attorney Rosa Filho crossed "all boundaries, violating Mariana's dignity as a person." The professor also noted that Rudson Marcos should have immediately halted the session; since he failed to do so, the hearing and all subsequent acts—including the verdict—are considered null and void: "You cannot separate the verdict from what occurred during that hearing. How can the verdict possess legitimacy, or even impartiality, if it stems from the entirety of the case record? The verdict does not even recount what happened during Mariana's testimony, demonstrating that such a shocking event is treated as 'normal' (...) [It is] tainted by the sexist culture present within the Judiciary." In the opinion of Marcela Miguens, a professor of Criminal Law and Criminal Procedural Law at the Federal Rural University of Rio de Janeiro, the entire proceeding is void: "By allowing the victim to be subjected to this type of questioning, the judge demonstrates bias, compromising his impartiality and rendering himself suspect. Such grounds for suspicion invalidate the proceedings, dating back to the judge's first act of intervention (...) the distress and humiliation [inflicted by the lawyer] illustrate the scrutiny to which a woman who has suffered gender-based violence—particularly sexual violence—is subjected." "In this case, Mariana Ferrer is openly insulted; her personal life is exposed and subjected to moral judgments—laden with misogyny—that bear no relation whatsoever to the sexual violence being investigated."

Isabela Del Monde, a lawyer and coordinator for Me Too Brasil, notes that this is one of the factors explaining why people do not report cases of sexual violence, even though Brazil has high rates of such crimes—particularly against children and adolescents. "Mari's case is practically a textbook example—a case to use in law school to teach exactly what not to do when such a report is made," says Del Monde.

=== 2026 Verdict vacation by the Supreme Court ans established precedent ===
On 18 June 2026, the verdict was unanimously overturned by the Supreme Federal Court (STF). During the hearing, the reporting justice, Alexandre de Moraes, harshly criticized the conduct of defense attorney Cláudio Gastão da Rosa Filho and Judge Rudson Marcos, alleging a "deplorable and criminal professional attitude." He also remarked that "not even a defendant accused of drug trafficking is treated this way," stating that Judge Rudson Marcos allowed the violation of Ferrer's rights. Moraes further alleged that Ferrer's testimony "was completely curtailed" and obtained "in total disregard for the victim's fundamental rights." He concluded: "There is no doubt that there was total disregard for the victim's fundamental rights. There was revictimization, as well as cruel and inhumane treatment, with the full acquiescence of the prosecutor. The way the victim was treated during the hearing is shameful".

Justice Cármen Lúcia stated that the proceedings were marked by disrespect toward the victim and prejudice on the part of the judge, concluding: "Where prejudice speaks, Justice falls silent." She spoke about the history in Brazil of blaming sexual violence victims—asking questions about the length of a skirt, for instance—and how this attitude persists within the Brazilian judiciary.

As a result of the case, the justices established the legal principle that evidence obtained through the humiliation and violation of victims' human rights must be annulled.

== Mariana Ferrer law ==
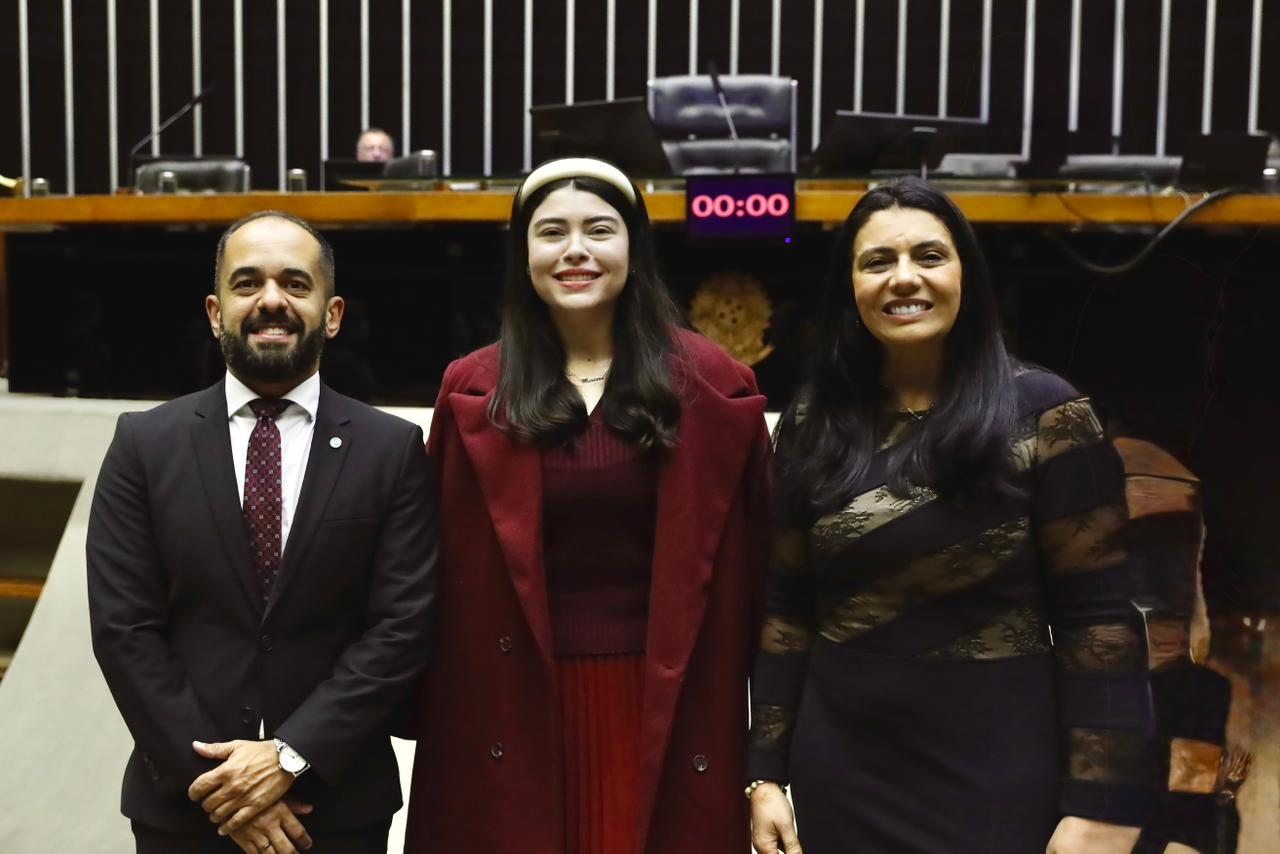
Solemn session at the Chamber of Deputies honoring the fourth anniversary of the Mariana Ferrer Law, attended by Mariana Ferrer (center) and Leonardo Magalhães, Federal Public Defender General (left) (2025)

On 22 November 2021, Federal Law No. 14,425 was approved by the Brazilian Congress, and it quickly became known as the Mariana Ferrer Law. It aims to curb disrespect toward victims or alleged victims, as well as witnesses, by amending existing legal provisions—specifically Decree-Laws No. 2,848 of 7 December 1940 (Penal Code) and No. 3,689 of 3 October 1941 (Code of Criminal Procedure), and Law No. 9,099 of 26 September 1995 (Law on Special Civil and Criminal Courts). The law aims to "curb acts that violate the dignity of victims and witnesses and to establish grounds for a sentence enhancement for the crime of coercion during legal proceedings."

Under the amendment to the Brazilian Code of Criminal Procedure introduced by the "Mariana Ferrer" Law, the newly added Art. 400-A states that "at the evidentiary and trial hearing—and, in particular, at those investigating crimes against sexual dignity—all parties and other procedural participants present must safeguard the victim's physical and psychological integrity, subject to civil, criminal, and administrative liability, with the judge responsible for ensuring compliance with the provisions of this article," prohibiting "statements regarding circumstances or elements extraneous to the facts under investigation in the proceedings" (Item I) and "the use of language, information, or material that offends the dignity of the victim or witnesses" (Item II)—a requirement reinforced within the same Code by the newly added Article 474-A.

== Work as an attorney ==
Mariana Ferrer went to law school, graduating with a thesis on her own trial. The defense was attended by Maria da Penha, Brazilian activist who gives her name to the law against domestic violence. She now works as an attorney.
