= Camila Crescimbeni =

Argentine politician

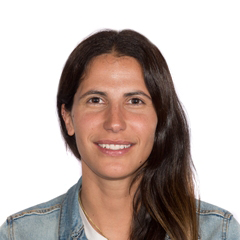

National Deputy
- Incumbent
- Assumed office 10 December 2019
- Constituency: Buenos Aires

Personal details
- Born: 22 March 1990 (age 36) Buenos Aires, Argentina
- Party: Republican Proposal
- Other political affiliations: Juntos por el Cambio (2015–present)
- Education: University of Buenos Aires

Camila Crescimbeni (born 22 March 1990) is an Argentine politician, currently serving as National Deputy elected in Buenos Aires Province since 2019. She is a member of Republican Proposal (PRO).

Crescimbeni was a member of the City Council of Almirante Brown from 2017 to 2019, and served as the president of Jóvenes PRO – Republican Proposal's youth wing – from 2018 to 2020.

== Early life and career ==
Crescimbeni was born on 22 March 1990 in Buenos Aires. She finished high school at Northlands School, in Olivos. She studied political science at the University of Buenos Aires, graduating in 2013. Crescimbeni earned a Fulbright scholarship and from 2008 to 2010 studied at Jean Moulin University Lyon 3, Washington and Lee University, and the Western Reserve Academy. She is married.

== Political career ==
From 2013 to 2015, Crescimbeni was an advisor at the Undersecretariat of Financial Administration at the Education Ministry of the Buenos Aires City Government. She was elected to the Almirante Brown Partido city council in 2017, as part of the Cambiemos list. In 2018, she became president of Jóvenes PRO, the youth wing of Republican Proposal, succeeding Pedro Robledo.

Crescimbeni ran for a seat in the Chamber of Deputies in the 2019 legislative election as the 14th candidate in the Juntos por el Cambio list in Buenos Aires Province. The list received 37.82% of the vote, and Crescimbeni was elected.

As a national deputy, Crescimbeni formed part of the parliamentary commissions on Families, Childhood and Youth, Housing and Urban Planning, Social Action and Public Health, Cooperative Affairs, Culture, and Women and Diversity. She was a vocal supporter of the legalization of abortion in Argentina. She voted in favour of the Voluntary Interruption of Pregnancy bill that passed the Argentine Congress in 2020. She was also a supporter of the law on environmental education for public officials, the so-called Ley Yolanda, named after Yolanda Ortiz.
