= Yolanda Ortiz (chemist) =

Argentine chemist (died 2019)

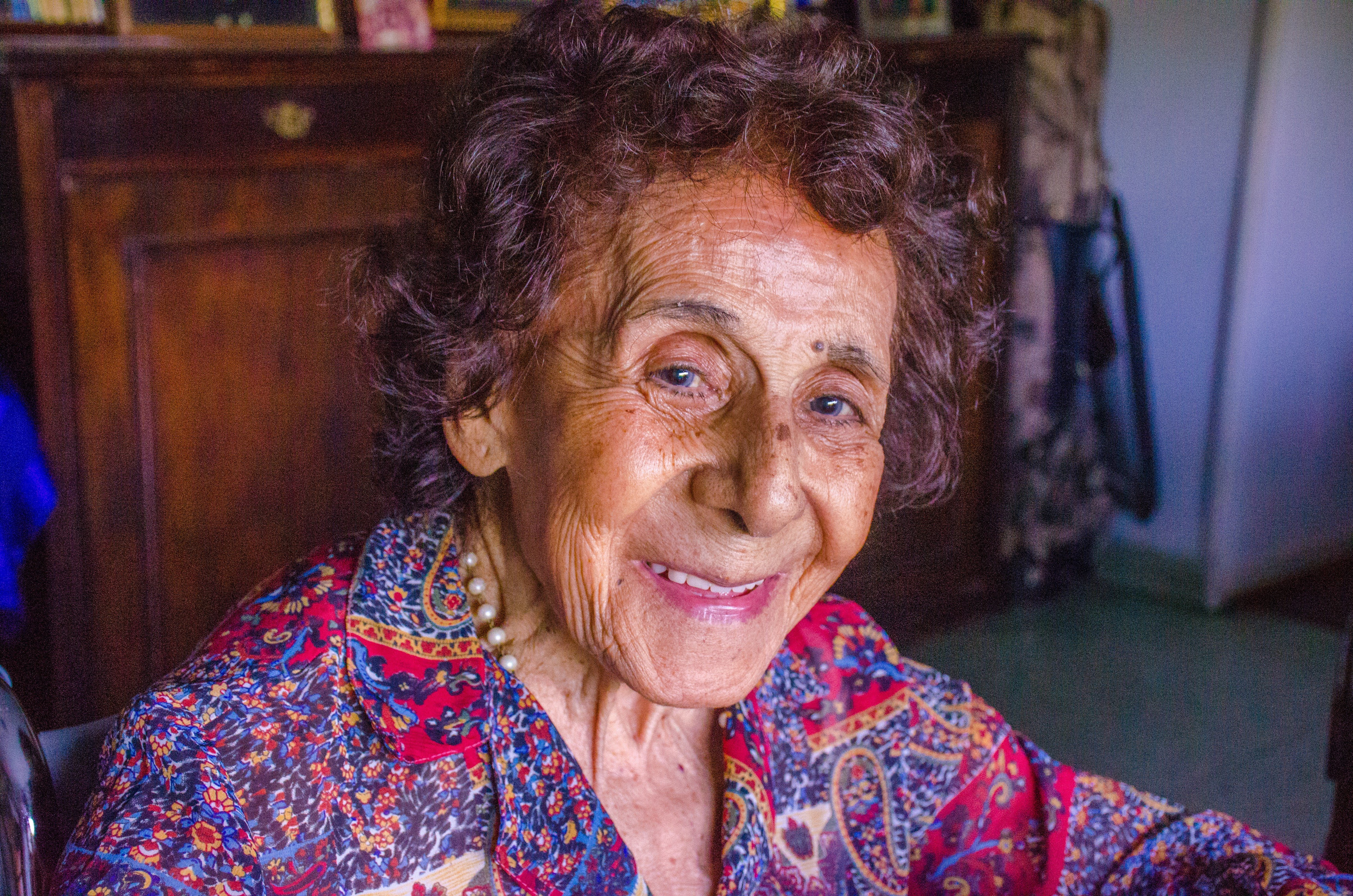
- Ortiz at home
- Born: 1923 or 1924; Tucumán, Argentina
- Died: 22 June 2019; Buenos Aires, Argentina
- Occupation(s): Chemist, environmentalist

Yolanda Ortiz (1923 or 1924, Tucumán – 22 June 2019, Buenos Aires) was an Argentine doctor of chemistry. She was the first Secretary of Natural Resources and Human Environment of Argentina, appointed by then-president Juan Perón in 1973. She was the first woman to hold such a position in Latin America. She was also an advisor to the Ministry of Environment and Sustainable Development of the Nation and of the Federal Council of the Environment (COFEMA).

In 2020, Argentina enacted Yolanda's Law, which requires public officials to receive comprehensive training in environmental issues and climate change. It was named in tribute to Ortiz.

== Life and work ==
Ortiz was born and raised in north Argentina, Tucumán, and when she finished high school, she moved with her family to Buenos Aires where she graduated in chemistry. According to Ortiz herself,:

... I reconciled with chemistry when I saw that I could develop my social side, to deal with the unhealthy environments of the workers, for instance. There I started to like it much more and it opened me up to the whole issue of pollution, of the wrong production model that had been followed, which was proving its failure because it destroyed nature and the social fabric.

Her first job was at the Shell company and then she worked at the State Customs Directorate to control the products that left and arrived in the country. During the 1960s, she studied toxicology at the Faculty of Exact and Natural Sciences at the University of Buenos Aires and soon, in that same decade, she obtained a scholarship to attend the Sorbonne, in France, where she remained until the end of the decade.

In 1973, Juan Perón asked her to return to Argentina to head the Secretariat of the Environment of Latin America, making her the only woman in an all-male cabinet. She was also the first woman to hold that position in all of Latin America.

However, after Peron's death and the overthrow of his successor and wife, Ortiz was forced to go into exile in Venezuela, where she worked at the Simón Bolívar University. She stayed there for six years.

Upon her return, at age 87, she founded the non-governmental ecological organization, the Argentine Environmental Center - CAMBIAR, of which she became president.

Yolanda Ortiz died in the city of Buenos Aires on 22 June 2019 "at the age of 94."

== Honors ==
- In February 2009, the Federal Council for the Environment (COFEMA) paid tribute to her career.
- In May 2015, the R21 Foundation – Sustainable Latin America, named Yolanda Ortiz an Honorary Member for her outstanding work in support of the environment and sustainability.
- On 27 April 2017, she received the Honorable Mention for her career in environmental care issues, the highest recognition of the Chamber of Deputies of the Nation.
- In 2018, the Senate of Argentina gave her the Juana Azurduy award in recognition of her career.
