= Occupational Health and Safety Regulation of British Columbia =

Workplace safety law in British Columbia

The Occupational Health and Safety (OHS) Regulation of British Columbia is the primary source of law governing workplace health and safety, which was most recently amended in 2016. It sets the standard to which workplaces must attain when inspected by WorkSafeBC, unless they are exempt from inspection, e.g. mines.

== Background ==
The Occupational Health and Safety (OHS) Regulation of British Columbia came into effect on April 15, 1998, and the most recent amendments came into effect on February 1, 2016. The requirements set out under the OHS Regulation are adopted under the authority of the Workers Compensation Act (WCA)

WorkSafeBC is responsible for enforcing workplace health and safety compliance as outlined by the OHS Regulation. Most workplaces in BC come under the jurisdiction of WorkSafeBC with the following exceptions:

- Mines, which are under the authority of the British Columbia Ministry of Energy and Mines
- Federally regulated employers (e.g. banks, transportation traveling out of province, radio, television, and cable services), which are under the authority of Federal Labour Program within Employment and Social Development Canada

== Purpose ==
According to WorkSafeBC's website, "The Occupational Health and Safety (OHS) Regulation and Part 3 of the Workers Compensation Act contain legal requirements for workplace health and safety that must be met by all workplaces under the inspection jurisdiction of WorkSafeBC."

== Organization ==
In total, the OHS Regulation contains 32 parts.

=== Parts 1-4: Core Requirements ===
These requirements apply to all workplaces in British Columbia.

==== Part 1 – Definitions ====
Part 1 contains definitions of key phrases and words used throughout the OHS Regulation. For example, Part 1.1 defines "hazard" as a thing or a condition that may expose a person to a risk of injury or occupational disease.

==== Part 2 – Application ====
This part provides an explanation on how the OHS Regulation applies to workplaces. Part. 2.1 outlines that the OHS Regulation applies to all employers, workers, and other individuals contributing to the production of any industry that falls under Part 3 of the Worker's Compensation Act. Additionally, Part 2.2 sets out the general duty for all work to be conducted without undue risk of work-related injury or disease regardless of whether specific requirements exist. Part 2.8 describes that contravention of the OHS Regulation is considered a violation by the employer and will make the employer liable for any penalty.

==== Part 3 – Rights and Responsibilities ====
Part 3 details the rights and responsibilities of employees and employers. Examples employer responsibilities outlined by the OHS Regulation include workplace inspections, providing occupational health and safety programs when required, and providing orientation and training to young or new workers. Employee rights include the ability to refuse unsafe work.

==== Part 4 – General Conditions ====
This part sets out generic requirements for workplace safety. Part 4 covers a variety of topics, ranging from emergency procedures to violence in the workplace. Additional topics include workplace conduct, storing and handling materials, and appropriate illumination levels.

=== Parts 5-19: General Hazard Requirements ===
Parts 5-19 deal with hazards found generally in a variety of workplaces and especially high-hazard workplaces. For example, the requirements outline the safe use of chemicals and machinery.

=== Parts 20-34: Industry/Activity Specific Requirements ===
Parts 20-34 sets out the requirements that apply to certain industries or activities such as forestry and agriculture.

== Associated Guidelines ==
The OHS Regulation has associated guidelines in order to assist with compliance. The guidelines provide ways to comply with the requirements set out by the OHS Regulation. Guidelines are updated regularly.
