= Criminal Procedure Act 1865 =

Act of the Parliament of the United Kingdom

Criminal Procedure Act 1865 (Note: The citation of this act by this short title was authorised by section 1 of, and the first schedule to, the Short Titles Act 1896. Due to the repeal of those provisions it is now authorised by section 19(2) of the Interpretation Act 1978.)
- Act of Parliament
- Parliament of the United Kingdom
- Long title: An Act for amending the Law of Evidence and Practice on Criminal Trials.
- Citation: 28 & 29 Vict. c. 18
- Territorial extent: England & Wales; Ireland; (Note: Section 10.)

Dates
- Royal assent: 9 May 1865
- Commencement: 9 May 1865 (Note: The Acts of Parliament (Commencement) Act 1793.)
Other legislation
Amended by	Criminal Law Act 1967; Criminal Law Act (Northern Ireland) 1967; Decimal Currency Act 1969; Police and Criminal Evidence Act 1984; Access to Justice Act 1999; Courts Act 2003; Criminal Justice Act 2003

Status: Amended

Text of statute as originally enacted

Revised text of statute as amended

Text of the Criminal Procedure Act 1865 as in force today (including any amendments) within the United Kingdom, from legislation.gov.uk.

The Criminal Procedure Act 1865 (28 & 29 Vict. c. 18), commonly known as Denman's Act, is an act of the Parliament of the United Kingdom.

The act was retained for the Republic of Ireland by section 2(2)(a) of, and part 4 of schedule 1 to, the Statute Law Revision Act 2007, which came into force on 8 May 2007.

In the Republic of Ireland, section 16 of the Criminal Justice Act 2006 is without prejudice to sections 3 to 6 of this act.

== Provisions ==
=== Section 1 – Provisions of sect. 2. of this Act to apply to trials commenced on or after July 1, 1865 ===
In England and Wales and Northern Ireland, section 1 of the act now reads:

The provisions of section two of this Act shall apply to every trial.. . ; and the provisions of sections from three to eight, inclusive, of this Act shall apply to all courts of judicature, as well criminal as all others, and to all persons having, by law or by consent of parties, authority to hear, receive, and examine evidence.

The words omitted were repealed for England and Wales by section 10(2) of, and Part III of Schedule 3 to, the Criminal Law Act 1967 and for Northern Ireland by Part II of Schedule 2 to the Criminal Law Act (Northern Ireland) 1967.

The words "for felony or misdemeanour" were repealed for the Republic of Ireland by section 16 of, and the third schedule to, the Criminal Law Act 1997.

=== Section 2 – Summing up of evidence in cases of felony and misdemeanor ===
In England and Wales and Northern Ireland, section 2 of the act now reads:

If any prisoner or prisoners, defendant or defendants, shall be defended by counsel, but not otherwise, it shall be the duty of the presiding judge, at the close of the case for the prosecution, to ask the counsel for each prisoner or defendant so defended by counsel whether he or they intend to adduce evidence; and in the event of none of them thereupon announcing his intention to adduce evidence, the counsel for the prosecution shall be allowed to address the jury a second time in support of his case, for the purpose of summing up the evidence against such prisoner or prisoners, or defendant or defendants; and upon every trial.. ., whether the prisoners or defendants, or any of them, shall be defended by counsel or not, each and every such prisoner or defendant, or his or their counsel respectively, shall be allowed, if he or they shall think fit, to open his or their case or cases respectively; and after the conclusion of such opening or of all such openings, if more than one, such prisoner or prisoners, or defendant or defendants, or their counsel, shall be entitled to examine such witnesses as he or they may think fit, and when all the evidence is concluded to sum up the evidence respectively; and the right of reply, and practice and course of proceedings, save as hereby altered, shall be as at present.

The words omitted were repealed for England and Wales by section 10(2) of, and Part III of Schedule 3 to, the Criminal Law Act 1967 and for Northern Ireland by Part II of Schedule 2 to the Criminal Law Act (Northern Ireland) 1967.

The words "for felony or misdemeanour" were repealed for the Republic of Ireland by section 16 of, and the third schedule to, the Criminal Law Act 1997.

This section is modified by section 3 of the Criminal Evidence Act 1898, section 42(1) of the Criminal Justice Act 1948 and section 1(1) of the Criminal Procedure (Right of Reply) Act 1964.

In the Republic of Ireland, this section is restricted by section 24(1) of the Criminal Justice Act 1984.

"Counsel"

This expression is defined by section 9 of the act.

=== Section 3 – How far witness may be discredited by the party producing ===
In England and Wales and Northern Ireland, section 3 of the act reads:

A party producing a witness shall not be allowed to impeach his credit by general evidence of bad character; but he may, in case the witness shall in the opinion of the judge prove adverse, contradict him by other evidence, or, by leave of the judge, prove that he has made at other times a statement inconsistent with his present testimony; but before such last-mentioned proof can be given the circumstances of the supposed statement, sufficient to designate the particular occasion, must be mentioned to the witness, and he must be asked whether or not he has made such statement.

"Adverse"

See Greenough v Eccles (1859) 5 CB (NS) 786, (1859) 33 LT (OS) 19, (1859) 5 Jur (NS) 766 (decided under section 22 of the Common Law Procedure Act 1854 (17 & 18 Vict. c. 125)).

"Inconsistent"

See Jackson v Thomason (1861) 31 LJQB 11

=== Section 4 – As to proof of contradictory statements of adverse witness ===
In England and Wales and Northern Ireland, this section reads:

If a witness, upon cross-examination as to a former statement made by him relative to the subject matter of the indictment or proceeding, and inconsistent with his present testimony, does not distinctly admit that he has made such statement, proof may be given that he did in fact make it; but before such proof can be given the circumstances of the supposed statement, sufficient to designate the particular occasion, must be mentioned to the witness, and he must be asked whether or not he has made such statement.

Sections 4 and 5 re-enact sections 23 and 24 of the Common Law Procedure Act 1854 (17 & 18 Vict. c. 125).

=== Section 5 – Cross-examinations as to previous statements in writing ===
In England and Wales and Northern Ireland, section 5 of the act reads:

A witness may be cross-examined as to previous statements made by him in writing, or reduced into writing, relative to the subject matter of the indictment or proceeding, without such writing being shown to him; but if it is intended to contradict such witness by the writing, his attention must, before such contradictory proof can be given, be called to those parts of the writing which are to be used for the purpose of so contradicting him: Provided always, that it shall be competent for the judge, at any time during the trial, to require the production of the writing for his inspection, and he may thereupon make such use of it for the purposes of the trial as he may think fit.

This section is exactly reproduced in the Evidence Ordinance (Laws of Hong Kong c 8)

=== Section 7 – As to proof by attesting witnesses ===
Section 7 of the act reads:

It shall not be necessary to prove by the attesting witness any instrument to the validity of which attestation is not requisite, and such instrument may be proved as if there had been no attesting witness thereto.

=== Section 8 – As to comparison of disputed writing ===
Section 8 of the act reads:

Comparison of a disputed writing with any writing proved to the satisfaction of the judge to be genuine shall be permitted to be made by witnesses; and such writings, and the evidence of witnesses respecting the same, may be submitted to the court and jury as evidence of the genuineness or otherwise of the writing in dispute.

=== Section 9 - "Counsel" ===
Section 9 of the act reads:

The word "counsel" in this Act shall be construed to apply to attorneys in all cases where attorneys are allowed by law or by the practice of any court to appear as advocates.

References to attorneys

In England and Wales, these must be construed as references to solicitors of the Senior Courts.

In Northern Ireland, these must be construed as references to solicitors of the Court of Judicature.

== Section 10 – Not to apply to Scotland ==
Section 10 of the act provides that the act does not apply to Scotland.

== Subsequent developments ==
The preamble to the act was repealed by section 1 of, and the schedule to, the Statute Law Revision Act 1893 (56 & 57 Vict. c. 14), which came into force on 9 June 1893.

== See also ==
- Criminal Procedure Act
