= Lone worker monitoring =

Lone worker monitoring is the practice of monitoring the safety of lone workers who may be exposed to unique risks, due to work conditions in which they are isolated from people who might be able to offer aid in the event of an emergency.

== Legislation ==
In some areas including the United Kingdom, Australian States, Ireland, New Zealand and certain Provinces in Canada, legislation has driven the adoption of lone worker policies as well as methods of monitoring the safety of these employees. In the United States, no explicit legislation exists regarding an employer's obligation to monitor the safety of its lone or isolated employees except in the shipbuilding industry.

== Methods of Monitoring Lone Worker Safety ==
Numerous methods have been developed and are currently in use by companies world-wide. These methods include:

- Phone-based check-in systems. Employees are required to call in to a designated receiver after a predetermined time. Check-ins are often performed hourly or bi-hourly. The two approaches to phone-based check-in systems are call center-driven and cloud-based automated monitoring, which may use a software-as-a-service (SaaS) model.
- Buddy systems. Employees may be paired up to perform certain tasks. Theoretically, should an emergency occur and one of the employees be rendered incapacitated, the other would remain available to call for help and provide aid.
- Safety monitoring smartphone applications. With the widespread adoption of smart phones, the deployment of a dedicated application allowing employees to quickly request aid has become more feasible. These applications may provide a panic button or allow for prompt check-in without requiring a phone call to be made. Some smartphone apps allow for hands-free triggers as well, like pulling a tether from the phone's headphone jack, so that the lone worker can signal for help without having to unlock their phone.
- Safety monitoring devices. Dedicated monitoring devices for monitoring local environmental conditions, such as dangerous levels of gases, that smartphone-based lone worker monitoring solutions are unable to account for. These devices are often worn rather than carried, clipped to either the lone worker's safety suit, ID badge, or some other piece of vital equipment.

== See also ==
- Employee monitoring
- Lone worker
