= Lone worker =

Workers who work individually without accompanying assistance

A lone worker (LW) is an employee who performs an activity that is carried out in isolation from other workers without close or direct supervision. Such staff may be exposed to risk because there is no-one to assist them and so a risk assessment may be required. Lone workers are now often supported by cloud-based automated monitoring systems and specialised monitoring call centres - often referred to as an 'Alarm Receiving Centre' or 'ARC' in the UK, or 'Emergency Dispatch Center' or 'EDC' in the US.

== Examples of lone workers ==
There are different types of lone workers including:

- People working at home such as remote workers, affiliated marketers, writers
- Workers in the energy industry or oil and gas Industry including upstream workers like surveyors, land managers, drillers, and midstream or downstream workers such as refinery workers and drivers
- Construction workers
- Mobile workers such as Door-to-door salesmen, truck drivers, health visitors, repair technicians
- People who work in any type of manufacturing facility
- People working outside normal hours such as security guards, cleaners
- Utility workers such as meter readers or technicians
- Self-employed people
- People who work apart from their colleagues such as receptionists, retail clerks, service station attendants
- Real estate agents, Home care nurses

== Countries with lone worker legislation ==
The following countries have enacted lone worker legislation:

- Australia
- Canada (Provinces of Alberta, British Columbia, Manitoba, Saskatchewan)
- France
- Germany
- Ireland
- New Zealand
- Spain
- United Kingdom

=== In Australia ===
Australia has legislation regarding lone workers and their employers. As of 1 January 2014, it has become compulsory for employers to monitor the health and well being of any of their employees working remotely or in isolated conditions. Control measures are now in place to ensure effective communication and worker monitoring are in place as well as access to assistance of emergency services for isolated or remote workers. Regulation 48 from the Managing the Work Environment and Facilities Code of Practice 2011 outlines definitions of isolated and remote workers as well as possible control measures and should be read for more information in regard to this law.'

- Guidance Note, Working Alone 2009

=== In Canada ===
The definition of a Lone Worker in Canada is someone who is alone at work or when they are on their own; when they cannot be seen or heard by another person. Lone worker regulations are complicated by the fact that there are fourteen jurisdictions – one federal, ten provincial and three territorial. Some of the provinces in Canada have enacted legislation regarding employer’s responsibility towards Lone Workers by having their governments create health and safety legislation. The legislations outline the general rights and responsibilities of the employer, the supervisor and the worker. Ontario, Nova Scotia and Yukon have no lone worker specific regulations.

==== Alberta ====
- Alberta's Occupational Health and Safety Code: An Explanation of the "Working Alone" Requirements 2009
- Working Alone (Part 28 of the Occupational Health and Safety Code) 2009

Additional Province-issued documents include:

- Working Alone Safely – A Guide for Employers and Employees 2000

==== British Columbia ====
- Working Alone or in Isolation Regulation 2011
- WorkSafeBC OHS Regulations General Conditions Part 4 2009

==== Manitoba ====
- Code of Practice for Workers Working Alone or in Isolation 2006
- Workplace Health and Safety Regulation Part 9

==== Saskatchewan ====
- The Occupational Health and Safety Regulations 1996

=== In France ===
France has enacted laws protecting lone workers.

- Code du travail - Article R4512-13 2008

=== In Germany ===
Germany has codified laws mandating when it is legal to work alone and how those workers must be protected.

- § 5 Arbeitsschutzgesetz

=== In Ireland ===
The Health and Safety Authority of Ireland identifies lone workers as those who work by themselves without close or direct supervision. Anybody who works alone, including contractors, self-employed people and employee, is classed as a lone worker.

Legislation relevant to the safety of lone workers in Ireland:

- Section 19 of the Safety, Health and Welfare at Work Act 2005
- Safety, Health and Welfare at Work (Extractive Industries) Reglulations 1997

=== In New Zealand ===
Employment New Zealand defines working alone as ‘Working alone is when work is done in a location where the employee can’t physically see or talk to other staff.’

The Health and Safety at Work Act 2015 requires employers to maintain regular contact with employees working alone or in isolation, if this is not possible, they should check in with a designated person at regular intervals. The employer must also provide an effective means of getting help quickly in an emergency.

=== In Spain ===
Spain has codified laws governing the protection of lone workers.

- Ley 31/1995 de Prevención de Riesgos Laborales 1995

=== In the United Kingdom ===
The UK has a Code of practice relating to the 'Provision of lone worker services' via the British Standard, BS 8484. In August 2016, the standard was republished, and BS 8484:2016 was introduced (superseding BS 8484:2011, which was withdrawn on 28 February 2017). The standard was updated again in March 2022, and republished as BS 8484:2022.

Other UK legislation relevant to the safety of lone workers:

- Health and Safety at Work etc. Act 1974
- The Management of made Health and Safety at Work Regulations 1999
- Safety Representatives and Safety Committees Regulations 1977(a)
- The Health and Safety (Consultation with Employees) Regulations 1996(b)
- Corporate Manslaughter and Corporate Homicide Act 2007
- Fire Act 2005

In November 2015, the Sentencing Council introduced a 'Definitive Guideline for Health and Safety Offences, Corporate Manslaughter and Food Safety and Hygiene Offences', effective in sentencing from 1 February 2016. Fines imposed are considered in accordance with several factors:

- the culpability of an organisation or individual;
- the likelihood of harm;
- financial information relating to an organisation - i.e. fines can now be directly linked to the turnover of a business or the earnings of an individual

=== Russia ===
Per various governmental decrees it's prohibited to use lone workers if they work at height, with electrical equipment, or in very tight or constrained conditions.

== Managing lone workers ==
Common practices used by companies to manage the personal safety of their Lone Workers are:

- Conducting Risk Assessments
- Documenting a Lone Worker Policy
- Implementation of a Buddy System
- Lone Worker Training
- Conflict Management Training
- Use of monitoring systems and equipment (including Panic Alarms, Mandown (fall/impact) Detectors, Pendant Trackers, GPS based Mobile apps).

== See also ==
- Lone worker monitoring
