= List of short titles =

This is a list of stock short titles that are used for legislation in one or more of the countries where short titles are used. It is also a list of articles that list or discuss legislation by short title or subject.

- Abortion Services (Safe Access Zones) Act
- Access to Abortion Services Act
- Access to Information and Protection of Privacy Act
- Accessibility Act
- Act of Uniformity
- Administration of Justice Act
- Aged Care Act
- Agricultural Holdings Act
- Animal Welfare Act
- Appellate Jurisdiction Act
- Appropriation Act
- Armed Forces Act
- Atomic Energy Act
- Atomic Energy Authority Act
- Autism Act
- Bank of England Act
- Bank Notes Act
- Bankruptcy Act
- Beerhouse Act
- Biosecurity Act
- Births and Deaths Registration Act
- Bridges Act
- British Museum Act
- British Nationality Act
- British North America Act
- British Sign Language Act
- British Subjects Act
- Broadcasting Act
- Building Societies Act
- Burial Act
- Child Poverty Act
- Children Act
- Church Building Act
- Church of England Act
- Church of Scotland Act
- Circular Economy Act
- Civil Rights Act
- Climate Change Accountability Act
- Climate Change Act
- Coinage Act
- Coinage Offences Act
- Commons Act
- Communications Act
- Companies Act
- Consolidated Fund Act
- Constitution Act
- Contagious Diseases (Animals) Act
- Copyright Act
- Coronavirus Act
- Coroners Act
- County Courts Act
- Court of Session Act
- Crimes Act
- Criminal Justice Act
- Criminal Law Act
- Criminal Law Amendment Act
- Criminal Procedure Act
- Crown Lands Act
- Dean Forest Act
- Defamation Act
- Defence Act
- Digital Economy Act
- Disability Discrimination Act
- Diseases of Animals Act
- Dogs Act
- East India Company Act
- Ecclesiastical Commissioners Act
- Ecclesiastical Courts Act
- Education Act
- Elections Act
- Employment Relations Act
- Energy Act
- Entail Act
- Environment Act
- Equality Act
- Evidence Act
- Factory Act
- Fatal Accidents Act
- Finance Act
- Finance Act (India)
- Firearms Act
- Fisheries Act
- Forcible Entry Act
- Forgery Act
- Freedom of Information and Protection of Privacy Act
- French Language Services Act
- Friendly Societies Act
- Government of India Act
- Government of Ireland Act
- Government of Wales Act
- Government Annuities Act
- Greater London Authority Act
- Greenwich Hospital Act
- Health and Social Care Act
- Highway Act
- House of Commons Disqualification Act
- House of Lords Act
- Housing Act
- Human Fertilisation and Embryology Act
- Human Rights Act
- Immigration Act
- Inclosure Act
- Income Tax Act
- Indemnity Act
- Indian Councils Act
- Infanticide Act
- International Copyright Act
- Interpretation Act
- Isle of Man (Customs) Act
- Judicature Act
- Juries Act
- Justices of the Peace Act
- Land Act
- Land Drainage Act
- Land Purchase Act
- Land Registration Act
- Landlord and Tenant Act
- Larceny Act
- Law of Property Act
- Law Reform Act
- Libel Act
- Licensing Act
- Limitation Act
- Local Government Act
- London Government Act
- Lunacy Act
- Magistrates' Courts Act
- Maori Language Act
- Marriage Act
- Matrimonial Causes Act
- Medical Act
- Mental Health Act
- Merchant Shipping Act
- Metropolitan Police Act
- Militia Act
- Misuse of Drugs Act
- Municipal Corporations Act
- National Debt Act
- National Health Service Act
- National Heritage Act
- National Security Act
- Northern Ireland Act
- Oaths Act
- Online Safety Act
- Obscene Publications Act
- Offences Against the Person Act
- Offences at Sea Act
- Official Information Act
- Official Languages Act
- Official Secrets Act
- Parliament Act
- Parliamentary Costs Act
- Patent Act
- Penal Servitude Act
- Period Products (Free Provision) Act
- Petroleum Act
- Piracy Act
- Police Act
- Poor Relief Act
- Post Office Act
- Postal Services Act
- Powers of Attorney Act
- Prevention of Corruption Act
- Prison Act
- Prevention of Terrorism Act
- Protection of Children Act
- Psychoactive Substances Act
- Public Health Act
- Public Libraries Act
- Public Order Act
- Public Schools Act
- Public Works Act
- Quarantine Act
- Queen Anne's Bounty Act
- Race Relations Act
- Railways Act
- Regency Act
- Regulatory Reform Act
- Repealing and Amending Act
- Representation of the People Act
- Revenue Act
- Riot Act
- Roman Catholic Relief Act
- Safe Access to Abortion Services Act
- Sale of Goods Act
- Scotland Act
- Sedition Act
- Settled Land Act
- Sexual Offences Act
- Short Titles Act
- Slave Trade Act
- Solicitors Act
- Stamp Act
- Statute Law (Repeals) Act
- Statute Law Revision Act
- Statute Revision Act
- Succession to the Crown Act
- Succession to the Throne Act
- Superannuation Act
- Supreme Court of Judicature Act
- Telecommunications Act
- Telegraph Act
- Terrorism Act
- Theft Act
- Tithe Act
- Town and Country Planning Act
- Trade Union Act
- Trading with the Enemy Act
- Tramways Act
- Treason Act
- Truck Act
- Trusts Act
- Unemployment Insurance Act
- Universities Act
- Unlawful Oaths Act
- Vaccination Act
- Vagrancy Act
- Visiting Forces Act
- Wales Act
- Weights and Measures Act
- Welfare Reform Act
- Welsh Language Act
- Wills Act
- Wireless Telegraphy Act
- Water Act
- Witchcraft Act
- Working for Workers Act

== See also ==
- List of legislation named for a person
- List of legislation named for a place
