= Council =

Group of people who come together to consult, deliberate, or make decisions

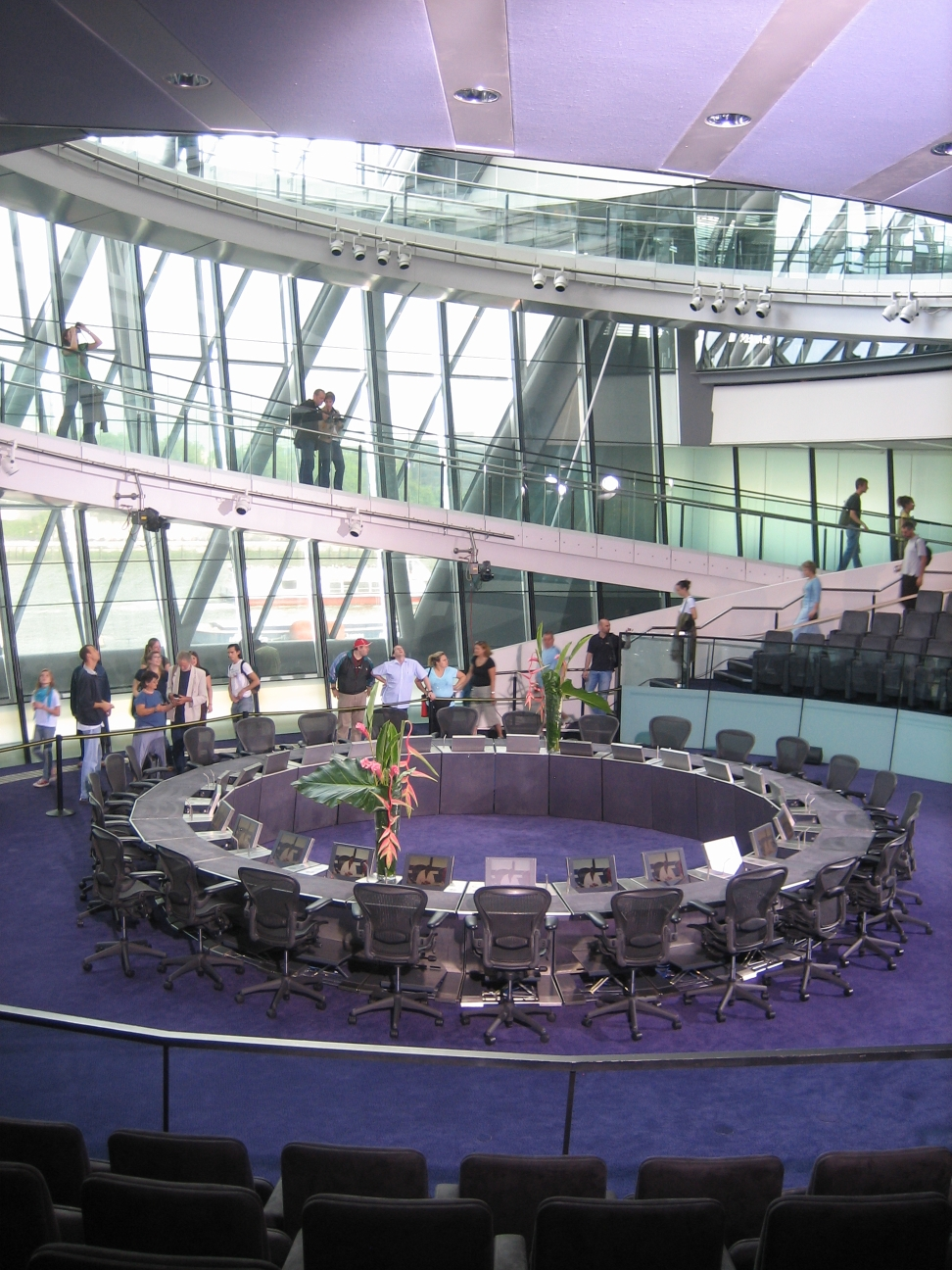
Greater London Authority Chamber

A council is a group of people who come together to consult, deliberate, or make decisions. A council may function as a legislature, especially at a town, city or county/shire level, but most legislative bodies at the state/provincial or national level are not considered councils. At such levels, there may be no separate executive branch, and the council may effectively represent the entire government. A board of directors might also be denoted as a council.

A committee might also be denoted as a council, though a committee is generally a subordinate body composed of members of a larger body, while a council may not be. Because many schools have a student council, the council is the form of governance with which many people are likely to have their first experience as electors or participants.

A member of a council may be referred to as a councillor or councilperson, or by the gender-specific titles of councilman and councilwoman.

== In politics ==
Notable examples of types of councils encountered in politics include:

- Borough council, a form of local government
- Catholic ecumenical councils, ecclesiastical gatherings for ordering the Catholic Church.
- City council, a form of local government.
- Community council, the most local official representative body in Scotland and in Wales.
- Council of Europe, a political, intergovernmental organization with 47 member countries.
- Council of the European Union, the upper house of the European Union.
- Council of state, an organ of government in many states.
- County council, a council that governs a county in the British Isles.
- District council, a unit of government in various jurisdictions.
- Ecumenical council, pan-Christian discussion bodies.
- European Council, the body of heads of states or of governments of the European Union.
- Labour council, an association of labour unions or union branches in a given area.
- Municipal council, a form of local government.
- National security council, an executive-branch governmental body responsible for coordinating policy on national security issues.
- Parish council (England), a form of local government in part of the United Kingdom.
- Privy council, a body that advises the head of state of a country.
- Provincial council, a governing body for a province.
- Regional council, a local-government body in various countries.
- Shire council, an entity of local government in Australia.
- Shura Council, the formerly upper house of the Egyptian parliament.
- Town council, a democratically elected form of government for small municipalities or parishes
- Tribal council, First Nations' and Native American Nations' governing bodies
- Research Councils UK, government agencies responsible for an area of research in the United Kingdom
- United Nations Security Council, a decision-making body at the United Nations
- Vatican Council, a high-level policy-council of the Roman Catholic Church
- Village council (State of Palestine), a local-government body in Palestine
- Workers' council, a council composed of working-class or proletarian members.

== In other fields ==
Types of councils encountered in other spheres include:

- Arts council: a government or private, non-profit organization dedicated to promoting the arts.
- Bar council: a professional body that regulates the profession of barristers together with the Inns of Court.
- Buddhist councils: important historical events in the history of Buddhism.
- Council (Boy Scouts): a non-profit private corporation within Boy Scouts of America.
- Ecumenical council: a meeting of the bishops of the whole church convened to discuss and settle matters of Church doctrine and practice.
- Military council:
- Science research council
- Student council: a student organization present in many elementary schools, middle schools, high schools, colleges and universities.
- Synod: in a Christian church.
- University Council: running a university.
- War Council: discussions pertaining to a declaration of war, or tactics and strategy of a coming battle.
- Works council: a body representing the workers of a plant, factory, etc., elected to negotiate with the management about working conditions, wages, etc.
- Youth council: an example of youth voice engaged in youth-led decision-making.

== See also ==
- Consul
- Legislative council
- Pontifical council
- Local government in Australia
- United Nations Security Council
- Directorial system: a form is government where a group of people act as the head of State and/or Government.

Media related to Councils at Wikimedia Commons
