= Indian Council =

Indian Council may refer to:

In India:

- Legislative Council of India (disambiguation)
- Indian Council of Agricultural Research, the apex body in agriculture and related allied fields in New Delhi, India
- Indian Council for Cultural Relations, a cultural promotion organization of the government of India
- Indian Council of Education
- Indian Council of Forestry Research and Education, an autonomous organization under the Ministry of Environment and Forests in India
- Indian Council of Historical Research, historical research organization in India
- Indian Council of Medical Research, the apex body in India for the formulation, coordination and promotion of biomedical research
- Indian Council of Philosophical Research, Indian philosophical organization
- Indian Council of Scientific and Industrial Research, government of India research institute
- Indian Council of Secondary Education, private education board in India
- Indian Council of Social Science Research, an Indian government agency
- Indian Council of World Affairs, a government of India foreign affairs think tank in New Delhi

In the United States:

- Minnesota Indian Affairs Council, a liaison between the government of Minnesota and the Native American tribes in the state of Minnesota
- Northern California Indian Development Council, a private nonprofit corporation that annually provides services to 14,000 to 15,000 clients

== See also ==
- Indian Councils Act (disambiguation)
- Tribal council (disambiguation)
