= LRA (disambiguation) =

The Lord's Resistance Army is a Christian terrorist transnational organization.

LRA may also refer to:

- Latvijas Reģionu apvienība (Latvian Association of Regions), a Latvian party
- Labor Research Association, US, set up by Communist Party in 1927
- Lake Ridge Academy, a school in North Ridgeville, Ohio, USA
- Land Registration Act (disambiguation), UK Acts of Parliament
- Labour Relations Agency (Northern Ireland)
- Land Registration Authority (Philippines)
- Locked-rotor amps
- Long-Range Aviation
- Louisiana Recovery Authority, created after 2005 hurricanes
