= AWA =

AWA may refer to:

== Companies and organizations ==
- Advancing Women Artists Foundation, American not-for-profit organization restoring work by female artists in Florence, Italy
- Africa Wrestling Alliance, a wrestling organization
- Africa World Airlines, Ghanaian airline company
- Amalgamated Weavers' Association, former trade union in the United Kingdom
- America West Airlines, former United States major airline
- American Whitewater, not-for-profit organization to conserve and restore whitewater resources
- American Wrestling Association, a former wrestling organization
- American Writers Association, a literary organization
- Anarchist Workers Association, a British anarchist organization
- Anime Weekend Atlanta, an annual anime convention located in Georgia
- Antique Wireless Association, a non-profit educational organization for operators and collectors of radio equipment.
- Artists Writers and Artisans, an American comics publisher also known as AWA Studios
- Australasian Women's Association (founded 1900), a Friendly Society
- AWA Technology Services, electronics manufacturer and broadcaster

== Law ==
- Adam Walsh Act, US federal statute that organizes sex offenders by crime
- All Writs Act, US federal statute which authorizes federal courts to issue writs
- Animal Welfare Act (disambiguation), several laws
- Australian workplace agreement, an employment contract

== Other abbreviations ==
- Aluminium wire armour, type of electrical cable
- Anarchism without adjectives, a school of anarchist thought
- Apparent wind angle, the angle of the wind experienced by a moving object
- Arctic World Archive, a data store on the island Svalbard, Norway
- Australian Web Archive, an online database of archived Australian websites

== Other uses ==
- AWA (singer) (born 1997), Swedish singer
- Andrew Wojteczko Autosport, a Canadian sports car racing team
- AWA Tower, office and communications complex in Sydney, Australia

== See also ==
- Awa (disambiguation)
