= Lord Campbell's Act =

Lord Campbell's Act, an act sponsored by or associated with John Campbell, 1st Baron Campbell, may refer to:

- The Libel Act 1843 (6 & 7 Vict. c.96)
- The Fatal Accidents Act 1846 (9 & 10 Vict. c.93)
- The Obscene Publications Act 1857

An action may be brought by and on behalf of legally designated beneficiaries, usually close family members or next of kin, to recover for the pecuniary loss that the death has caused. Generically these statutes are called Lord Campbell's Acts, after the first such statute adopted in 1846 in England. The survival and wrongful death interests may be vindicated in a single action. (Tort Law and Alternatives by Marc A. Franklin page 18)
