= TCPA =

TCPA may refer to:

- Telephone Consumer Protection Act of 1991, United States law
- Town and Country Planning Act (disambiguation), various acts
  - Town and Country Planning Act 1990, act of the United Kingdom Parliament
- Town and Country Planning Association, United Kingdom independent charity
- Trusted Computing Platform Alliance, former computer industry group succeeded by the Trusted Computing Group
