= List of public welfare organisations in Malaysia =

This is a list of public welfare organisations based in Malaysia under the administration of Department of Social Welfare, Ministry of Women, Family and Community Development.

== Children's Home ==
Children's Home (Rumah Kanak-kanak) was established under Section 54, Child Act 2001.

1. Rumah Kanak-kanak Taman Bakti, Kepala Batas, Pulau Pinang
2. Rumah Kanak-kanak Sultan Abd Aziz, Kuala Kangsar, Perak
3. Rumah Kanak-kanak Tengku Budriah, Cheras, Kuala Lumpur
4. Rumah Kanak-kanak Tengku Ampuan Fatimah, Kuantan, Pahang
5. Rumah Budak Laki-laki Tun Abdul Aziz, Durian Daun, Melaka
6. Pusat Perkembangan Kemahiran Kebangsaan Serendah, Selangor
7. Rumah Kanak-kanak Kota Kinabalu, Sabah
8. Rumah Kanak-kanak Arau, Perlis
9. Rumah Kanak-kanak Kuching, Sarawak
10. Rumah Kanak-kanak Rembau, Negeri Sembilan
11. Rumah Kanak-kanak Sultanah Hajjah Kalsom, Kuantan, Pahang
12. Rumah Kanak-kanak Mini Kelantan
13. Rumah Kanak-kanak Mini Johor

== Tunas Harapan Home ==
1. Rumah Tunas Harapan Tengku Ampuan Rahimah, Kuala Selangor, Selangor
2. Rumah Tunas Harapan Payung Sejahtera, Kuala Pilah, Negeri Sembilan
3. Rumah Tunas Harapan Darul Hilmi, Kuala Terengganu, Terengganu
4. Rumah Tunas Harapan Semarak Kasih, Jasin, Melaka
5. Rumah Tunas Harapan Taman Kemumin, Kelantan
6. Rumah Tunas Harapan Kompleks Penyayang Bakti, Sungai Buloh, Selangor
7. Rumah Tunas Harapan Semai Bakti, Pahang
8. Rumah Tunas Harapan Sepenuh Hati, Rawang, Selangor
9. Rumah Tunas Harapan Sepenuh Hati 2, Seri Kembangan, Selangor

== Rumah Perlindungan ATIP ==
1. Rumah Perlindungan Rembau, Negeri Sembilan (all-girls)
2. Rumah Perlindungan Bukit Senyum, Johor (all-boys)

== Probation Hostel ==
Probation Hostel (Asrama Akhlak) was established under the Section 61, Child Act 2001.

=== All-boys ===
1. Asrama Akhlak Pokok Sena, Kedah
2. Asrama Akhlak Selibin, Ipoh, Perak
3. Asrama Akhlak Paya Terubong, Ayer Itam, Penang
4. Asrama Sentosa, Kuala Lumpur
5. Asrama Akhlak Bukit Baru, Melaka
6. Asrama Akhlak Lelaki Kempas, Johor Bahru, Johor
7. Asrama Akhlak Rusila, Kuala Terengganu, Terengganu
8. Asrama Akhlak Kuching, Kota Samarahan, Sarawak

=== All-girls ===
1. Asrama Akhlak (P) Jitra, Kedah
2. Asrama Bahagia Kampung Pandan, Kuala Lumpur

== Tunas Bakti School ==
Tunas Bakti School (Sekolah Tunas Bakti) was established under the Section 65, Child Act 2001.

1. Sekolah Tunas Bakti Telok Air Tawar, Butterworth, Penang
2. Sekolah Tunas Bakti Marang, Terengganu
3. Sekolah Tunas Bakti, Sungai Lereh, Melaka
4. Sekolah Tunas Bakti Sungai Besi, Kuala Lumpur
5. Sekolah Tunas Bakti Taiping, Perak
6. Sekolah Tunas Bakti, Kuching, Sarawak
7. Sekolah Tunas Bakti Kota Kinabalu, Sabah

== Taman Seri Puteri ==
Taman Seri Puteri was established under the Section 55, Child Act 2001.

1. Taman Seri Puteri Batu Gajah, Perak
2. Taman Seri Puteri Cheras, Selangor
3. Taman Seri Puteri Kota Kinabalu, Sabah
4. Taman Seri Puteri Kuching, Sarawak

== Desa Bina Diri ==
1. Desa Bina Diri Mersing, Johor
2. Desa Bina Diri Jerantut, Pahang
3. Desa Bina Diri Kuching, Sarawak
4. Desa Bina Diri Kota Kinabalu, Sabah
5. Pusat Sehenti Bina Diri Sungai Buloh, Selangor

== Rumah Ehsan ==
1. Rumah Ehsan Dungun, Terengganu
2. Rumah Ehsan Kuala Kubu Bahru, Selangor

== Rumah Seri Kenangan ==
1. Rumah Seri Kenangan Kangar, Perlis
2. Rumah Seri Kenangan Taiping, Perak
3. Rumah Seri Kenangan Kinta, Perak
4. Rumah Seri Kenangan Cheras, Selangor
5. Rumah Seri Kenangan Seremban, Negeri Sembilan
6. Rumah Seri Kenangan Cheng, Melaka
7. Rumah Seri Kenangan Johor Bahru, Johor
8. Rumah Seri Kenangan Kemumin, Kelantan
9. Rumah Seri Kenangan Bedong, Kedah

== Taman Sinar Harapan ==
1. Taman Sinar Harapan Kuala Terengganu, Terengganu
2. Taman Sinar Harapan Cheras, Selangor
3. Taman Sinar Harapan Tuanku Ampuan Najihah, Seremban, Negeri Sembilan
4. Taman Sinar Harapan Tampoi, Johor Bahru, Johor
5. Taman Sinar Harapan Jubli, Johor Bahru, Johor
6. Taman Sinar Harapan Kuala Kubu Bharu, Selangor
7. Taman Sinar Harapan Jitra, Kedah
