= Copyright Act =

Stock short title used for legislation

Copyright Act (with its variations) is a stock short title used for legislation in Australia, Canada, Hong Kong, India, Malaysia, New Zealand, the United Kingdom and the United States relating to the copyright. The Bill for an Act with this short title will usually have been known as a Copyright Bill during its passage through Parliament.

== List ==
=== Australia ===
- The Copyright Act 1968

=== Canada ===
- The Copyright Act of Canada

=== Ghana ===
- Copyright Act, 2005

=== Hong Kong ===
- The Copyright Ordinance 1997

=== India ===
- The Indian Copyright Act, 1957

=== Malaysia ===
- The Copyright Act 1969
- The Copyright Act 1987

=== New Zealand ===
- The Copyright Act 1994

=== United Kingdom ===
- The Statute of Anne or Copyright Act 1709 (8 Ann. c. 21), the first copyright act of the United Kingdom
- The Copyright Act 1842 (5 & 6 Vict. c. 45)
- The Copyright Act 1911 (1 & 2 Geo. 5. c. 46)
- The Copyright Act 1956 (4 & 5 Eliz. 2. c. 52)
- The Copyright, Designs and Patents Act 1988 (c. 48), current copyright law of the United Kingdom

=== United States ===
- The Copyright Act of 1790
- The Copyright Act of 1831
- The Copyright Act of 1870
- The Copyright Act of 1909
- The Copyright Act of 1976
- The International Copyright Act of 1891

== See also ==
- List of copyright acts
- International Copyright Act
- List of short titles
- Category:Copyright law by country
