= Awa =

Awa (or variants) may refer to:

== People ==
- Awa (given name), notable people named Awa or Hawa
- Awá (Brazil), an indigenous people of Brazil
- Awa-Kwaiker, an indigenous people of Colombia and Ecuador
- Wa people, a Southeast Asian ethnicity in Myanmar, China, and Thailand, mostly on the Awa mountain range

== Languages ==
- Awa language (China) or Wa (Va) language, language of the Wa people of Burma and China
- Awa language (Papua New Guinea), a Kainantu language of Papua New Guinea
- Awa Pit language, a Barbacoan language spoken by the Awa-Kwaiker people in Colombia and Ecuador
- Awadhi language (ISO 639 code: awa), an Eastern Hindi language spoken in northern India
- Guajá language or Awá, the language of the Awá people of Brazil
- Khumi language or Awa, a Kukish language of Burma

== Music ==
- Awa (musician) or Leena Peisa (born 1979), Finish musician
- AWA (singer) or Awa Santesson-Sey (born 1997), Swedish singer
- A-WA, Israeli hip-hop and world music band

== Places ==
- Awa mountain, China, a mountain range in the Yunnan province
- Awa, Tokushima, Japan, a town
- Awa District, Chiba, Japan, a modern geographical administrative division
- Awa District, Tokushima, Japan, a modern geographical administrative division
- Awa Province (Chiba), Japan, a historical geographical administrative division
- Awa Province (Tokushima), Japan, a historical geographical administrative division
- Awa Station, a railway station in Kōchi Prefecture, Japan
- Inwa or Awa, Myanmar, imperial capital of Burmese kingdoms from the 14th to 19th centuries

== Other uses ==
- Awa Society, a mask and initiatory society of the Dogon people of Mali
- Awa (magazine), a Senegalese women's magazine from 1964 to 1973
- Milkfish or awa, a tropical marine fish (Chanos chanos)
- Kava or ʻawa, a plant (Piper methysticum) consumed for its sedating effects throughout Polynesia

== See also ==
- AWA (disambiguation)
