= Awa District =

Awa District may refer to:

- Awa District, Chiba, Japan
- Awa District, Tokushima, Japan

== See also ==
- Awa (disambiguation)
