= Income Tax Act =

Income Tax Act may refer to:

== United Kingdom ==
- Income Tax Act 1842 (5 & 6 Vict. c. 35)
- Income Tax Act 1952 (15 & 16 Geo. 6 & 1 Eliz. 2. c. 10)
- Income Tax (Trading and Other Income) Act 2005 (c. 5)
- Income Tax Act 2007 (c. 3)

== Elsewhere ==
- Income Tax Act 1976, a Statute of New Zealand
- Income Tax Act 1985, an Act governing income taxes in Canada since 1917, with the current version enacted in 1985.
- Income-tax Act, 1961, an Act of the Parliament of India
- Individual Income Tax Act of 1944, an Act raising income tax in the United States
