= Communications Act =

Communications Act may refer to:

- The Communications Act of 1934 in the United States
- The Communications Act 2003 (c. 21) in the United Kingdom

== See also ==
- List of short titles
