= Children and Adoption Act 2006 =

Act of the Parliament of the United Kingdom

Children and Adoption Act 2006 (Note: Section 17(1).)
- Act of Parliament
- Parliament of the United Kingdom
- Long title: An Act to make provision as regards contact with children; to make provision as regards family assistance orders; to make provision about risk assessments; to make provision as regards adoptions with a foreign element; and for connected purposes.
- Citation: 2006 c. 20
- Territorial extent: England and Wales; Northern Ireland (in part); (Note: Section 17(6)–(8). Except that sections 9 to 11, 12(1) to (5) and (7), 16 and 17 also extend to Northern Ireland and the amendment or repeal of an enactment has the same extent as the enactment to which it relates.)

Dates
- Royal assent: 21 June 2006
- Commencement: Various (Note: Section 17(2)–(5))
Other legislation
Amended by	Sentencing Act 2020
Relates to	Childcare Act 2006

Status: Amended

History of passage through Parliament

Text of statute as originally enacted

Revised text of statute as amended

The Children and Adoption Act 2006 (c. 20) is an act of the Parliament of the United Kingdom.

The precursors of the act are:

- Parental Separation: Children's Needs and Parents' Responsibilities (Cm 6273), a green paper published in July 2004
- Parental Separation: Children's Needs and Parents' Responsibilities: Next Steps (Cm 6452), published in January 2005
- The Draft Children (Contact) and Adoption Bill, published on 2 February 2005
- The Report from the Joint Committee on the Draft Children (Contact) and Adoption Bill, published on 12 April 2005
- The Government Reply to the Report from the Joint Committee on the Draft Children (Contact) and Adoption Bill (Cm 6583), published on 8 June 2005

== Provisions ==
The act contains measures to promote compliance with contact orders made under the Children Act 1989. The act permits the Secretary of State to suspend adoptions from outside the United Kingdom where the Secretary of State has concerns about the foreign country's adoption practices.

The act clarifies the legal definition of harm so that witnessing domestic abuse is accounted for.

=== Section 17 - Short title, commencement and extent ===
The following orders have been made under this section:

- The Children and Adoption Act 2006 (Commencement No. 1) Order 2007 (S.I. 2007/2287 (C. 86))
- The Children and Adoption Act 2006 (Commencement No. 2) Order 2008 (S.I. 2008/1798 (C. 76))
- The Children and Adoption Act 2006 (Commencement No. 3) Order 2008 (S.I. 2008/2870 (C. 127))
- The Children and Adoption Act 2006 (Commencement No. 4) Order 2010 (S.I. 2010/2612 (C. 124))
- Children and Adoption Act 2006 (Commencement No. 1) (Wales) Order 2007 (S.I. 2007/733 (W. 65) (C. 31))

== See also ==
- Children Act
