= Statute Revision Act =

Stock short title for Canadian legislation

Statute Revision Act is a stock short title used for legislation in Canada which relates to revision of statutes.

== List ==
Alberta

- Statute Revision Act, RSA 2000, c S-19

British Columbia

- Statute Revision Act, RSBC 1996, c 440

New Brunswick

- Statute Revision Act, SNB 2003, c S-14.05
- Statute Revision Act, RSNB 2011, c 224

Newfoundland and Labrador

- Subordinate Legislation Revision and Consolidation Act, SNL 1995, c S-29.1

Northwest Territories

- Statute Revision Act, SNWT 1996, c 16

Nova Scotia

- Statute Revision Act, RSNS 1989, c 443

Nunavut

- An Act Respecting the Statute Revision Act, SNWT (Nu) 1987(1), c 32
- Statute Revision Act, SNWT (Nu) 1996, c 16

Ontario

- Statute and Regulation Revision Act, 1998, SO 1998, c 18, Sch C

Saskatchewan

- Statutes and Regulations Revision Act, SS 1995, c S-59.01

== See also ==
- List of short titles
