= Health and Social Care Act =

Health and Social Care Act may refer to:

== United Kingdom legislation ==
- Health and Social Care Act 2001 (c. 15)
- Health and Social Care (Community Health and Standards) Act 2003 (c. 43)
- Smoking, Health and Social Care (Scotland) Act 2005 (asp 13)
- Health and Social Care Act 2008 (c. 14)
- Health and Social Care Act 2012 (c. 7)

(Note: An act with this short title will have been known as a Health and Social Care Bill during its passage through Parliament)

== See also ==
- Department of Health and Social Care
- Health and Care Act 2022
- Health and Social Care Levy
- Health and Social Care (Northern Ireland)
- List of short titles
