= Law of Property Act =

Commonwealth acts relating to property law

Law of Property Act (with its variations) is a stock short title used for legislation in the United Kingdom and the British Virgin Islands relating to property law.

The bill for an act with this short title may have been known as a Law of Property Bill during its passage through Parliament.

== List ==
=== United Kingdom ===
- The Law of Property Amendment Act 1859 (22 & 23 Vict. c. 35)
- The Conveyancing and Law of Property Act 1881 (44 & 45 Vict. c. 41), also called the Conveyancing Act 1881
- The Law of Property Act 1922 (12 & 13 Geo. 5. c. 16)
- The Law of Property Act (Postponement) Act 1924 (15 & 16 Geo. 5. c. 4)
- The Law of Property (Amendment) Act 1924 (15 & 16 Geo. 5. c. 5)
- The Law of Property Act 1925 (15 & 16 Geo. 5. c. 20)
- The Law of Property (Amendment) Act 1926 (16 & 17 Geo. 5. c. 11)
- The Law of Property (Amendment) Act 1929 (19 & 20 Geo. 5. c. 9)
- The Law of Property (Entailed Interests) Act 1932 (22 & 23 Geo. 5. c. 27)
- The Law of Property (Joint Tenants) Act 1964 (c. 63)
- The Law of Property Act 1969 (c. 59)
- The Law of Property (Miscellaneous Provisions) Act 1989 (c. 34)
- The Law of Property (Miscellaneous Provisions) Act 1994 (c. 36)

=== British Virgin Islands ===
- The Conveyancing and Law of Property Act (Cap 220) of 1967 in the law of the British Virgin Islands

== See also ==
List of short titles
