= Employment Relations Act 2004 =

Act of the Parliament of the United Kingdom

Employment Relations Act 2004 (Note: Section 59(1).)
- Act of Parliament
- Parliament of the United Kingdom
- Long title: An Act to amend the law relating to the recognition of trade unions and the taking of industrial action; to make provision about means of voting in ballots under the Trade Union and Labour Relations (Consolidation) Act 1992; to amend provisions of that Act relating to rights of members and non-members of trade unions and to make other provision about rights of trade union members, employees and workers; to make further provision concerning the enforcement of legislation relating to minimum wages; to make further provision about proceedings before and appeals from the Certification Officer; to make further provision about the amalgamation of trade unions; to make provision facilitating the administration of trade unions and the carrying out by them of their functions; and for connected purposes.
- Citation: 2004 c. 24
- Territorial extent: England and Wales (except sections 43 and 58); Scotland (except sections 43 and 58); Northern Ireland (sections 43 and 58); any amendment by the act of an enactment (including an enactment contained in Northern Ireland legislation) has the same extent as the enactment amended.; (Note: Section 59(5)–(7).)

Dates
- Royal assent: 16 September 2004
- Commencement: Various (Note: Section 59(2)–(4).)
Other legislation
Amends	Agricultural Wages Act 1948; Employment Tribunals Act 1996

Status: Amended

Text of statute as originally enacted

Revised text of statute as amended

The Employment Relations Act 2004 (c. 24) is an act of the Parliament of the United Kingdom which amended UK law regarding trade union membership and industrial action. The act also enabled the UK government to make funds available to trade unions and federations of trade unions to modernise their operations.

== Background ==
The legislation was a response to concerns raised by the International Labour Organisation's committee of experts relating to trade union recognition.

== Provisions ==
The act introduced changes to the recognition procedures for unions.

The act contains provisions relating to discrimination on grounds of trade union membership and protection of strikers from unfair dismissal.

The act allows trade unions to expel or exclude racist activists, and other individuals whose political behaviour is considered incompatible with trade union membership.

The act made changes to the ballots for industrial action.

=== Section 59 - Citation, commencement and extent ===
The following orders have been made under this section:

- The Employment Relations Act 2004 (Commencement No. 1 and Transitional Provisions) Order 2004 (S.I. 2004/2566 (C. 108))
- The Employment Relations Act 2004 (Commencement No. 2 and Transitional Provisions) Order 2004 (S.I. 2004/3342 (C. 156))
- The Employment Relations Act 2004 (Commencement No. 3 and Transitional Provisions) Order 2005 (S.I. 2005/872 (C. 36))
- The Employment Relations Act 2004 (Commencement No. 4 and Transitional Provisions) Order 2005 (S.I. 2005/2419 (C. 100))

== Reception ==
According to the Trades Union Congress (TUC), the act contained "significant union victories". The TUC's then general secretary, Brendan Barber welcomed the law, noting that "Staff will have to be given information and be consulted over major changes to the business, as they currently are in Britain’s best companies. Trade unions will be able to recruit members in an environment free of underhand, US-style union-busting activities and will find it easier the exclude and expel far-right activists in breach of union rules. The union modernisation fund the [Act] establishes will enable unions to modernise in the same way the government has helped businesses adapt to grow in the modern economy."

== See also ==
- Employment Relations Act
