= List of statutes of New Zealand (1975–1984) =

This is a partial list of statutes of New Zealand for the period of the Third National Government of New Zealand up to and including part of the first year of the Fourth Labour Government of New Zealand.

== 1970s ==
=== 1976 ===
- Alcoholic Liquor Advisory Council Act Amended: 1977/78/79/86/87/89
- Christchurch Town Hall Board of Management Act
- District Grand Lodges of English Freemasons of New Zealand Trustees Act
- Energy Resources Levy Act Amended: 1978/83
- Foreign Travel Tax Act
- Income Tax Act Amended: 1977/78/79/80/81/82/83/84/85/86/87/88/89/90/91/92/93/94/98/99/2005
- International Energy Agreement Act
- Optometrists and Dispensing Opticians Act Amended: 1980/82/94/96/99
- Plumbers, Gasfitters, and Drainlayers Act Amended: 1980/85/86/88/92/93/99
- Poultry Board Act Amended: 1978/87
- Small Claims Tribunals Act Amended: 1979/85
- Stewart Island Reserves Empowering Act
- Superannuation Schemes Act Amended: 1982/87/90/92/94/96/98/2001/04
- Wanganui Computer Centre Act Amended: 1977/79/80/83/85/86/89
- Wine Makers Levy Act Amended: 1987

Plus 143 acts amended

=== 1977 ===
- Bay of Plenty Catchment Commission and Regional Water Board Administrative Expenses Re Act
- Bay of Plenty Harbour Board Empowering Act
- Building Performance Guarantee Corporation Act
- Chateau Companies Act
- Citizenship Act Amended: 1979/85/92/2000/01/02/05
- Commonwealth Countries Act
- Contraception, Sterilisation, and Abortion Act 1977 Amended: 1978/90
- Contractual Mistakes Act Amended: 1985/2002
- Fishing Vessel Ownership Savings Act Amended: 1980/83/84/87
- Government Superannuation Fund Act Amended: 1976/78/79/80/85/86/87/88/89/90/91/92/95/97/99/2001/03/05
- Hawke's Bay Catchment Board Empowering Act
- Higher Salaries Commission Act Amended: 1980/82/83/85/87/88/89/92
- Human Rights Commission Act Amended: 1981/82/83/85/91/92/93
- Insurance Law Reform Act
- Joint Council for Local Authorities Services Act Amended: 1978/88
- Ministry of Energy Act Amended: 1981/83/85/87/88/89
- Motueka Borough Reclamation Act
- New Zealand Planning Act Amended: 1987
- Potato Industry Act Amended: 1981/87
- Public Finance Act Amended: 1980/81/82/83/86/87/90/91/92/94/99/2000/04
- Queen Elizabeth the Second National Trust Act Amended: 1983/87/88/91/96/2003
- Reserves Act 1977 Amended: 1978/79/80/81/83/85/88/92/93/94/96/2005
- Road User Charges Act Amended: 1979/80/81/82/84/86/88/89/92/95/97/2002
- Rotorua County Council Empowering Act
- Safety of Children's Night Clothes Act
- Seal of New Zealand Act
- Securities Transfer Act Amended: 1987/2007
- Seddon Shield Districts Trotting Jackpot Empowering Act
- Shop Trading Hours Act Amended: 1978/79/80/82/89
- Southland Harbour Board Reclamation and Empowering Act
- State Services Conditions of Employment Act Amended: 1978/79/80/81/82/83/85/87
- Territorial Sea and Exclusive Economic Zone Act Amended: 1980/85/96
- Town and Country Planning Act 1977
- Wild Animal Control Act 1977 Amended: 1978/79/82/85/94/97/99

Plus 135 acts amended and one act repealed.

=== 1978 ===
- Auckland Electric Power Board Act Amended: 1958/63/69/75/79/81
- Christchurch-Lyttelton Road Tunnel Authority Dissolution Act
- Co-operative Forestry Companies Act
- Customs Order Confirmation Act
- Heavy Engineering Research Levy Act Amended: 1986/87/96
- Hive Levy Act Amended: 1982
- Industrial Training Levies Act Amended: 1985/89
- Liquid Fuels Trust Act
- Marine Mammals Protection Act 1978 Amended: 1979/94
- Massage Parlours Act 1978
- Mount Egmont Vesting Act
- Nelson City Forestry Empowering Act
- New Zealand Council for Postgraduate Medical Education Act Amended: 1988
- New Zealand Film Commission Act Amended: 1980/85/88/94/99
- New Zealand National Airways Corporation Dissolution Act
- New Zealand Register of Osteopaths Incorporated Act
- Northland Harbour Board Empowering Act
- Noxious Plants Act Amended: 1981/82/88
- Securities Act Amended: 1979/82/86/88/93/94/96/97/98/2000/01/02/04/06/07

Plus 116 acts amended and one act repealed.

=== 1979 ===
- Auckland Municipal Abattoir Livestock Auctions Empowering Act
- Carriage of Goods Act Amended: 1980/86/89
- Contractual Remedies Act Amended: 1985/2002
- Electrical Registration Act Amended: 1982
- International Departure Tax Act
- National Development Act 1979 Amended: 1981
- Pesticides Act Amended: 1987/94
- Public Service Investment Society Management Act
- Remuneration Act
- Reserves and Other Land Disposal Act
- Rotorua High Schools Board Empowering Act
- Toxic Substances Act Amended: 1983/86/88
- Vocational Awards Act Amended: 1982
- Waimea County Council Empowering Act

Plus 146 acts amended and two acts repealed.

== 1980s ==
=== 1980 ===
- Domestic Air Travel Tax Act
- Family Courts Act Amended: 1991/2000/04/07
- Family Proceedings Act Amended: 1981/82/83/85/86/88/89/91/94/95/97/98/2000/01
- Maternity Leave and Employment Protection Act
- Otago Southland Flood Relief Committee Empowering Act
- Timaru Harbour Board Reclamation and Empowering Act
- Urban Transport Act Amended: 1982/85/88

Plus 108 acts amended and one act repealed.

=== 1981 ===
- Anglican Church Trusts Act Amended: 1989
- Antarctic Marine Living Resources Act Amended: 1999/2001/02
- Boxing and Wrestling Act
- Credit Contracts Act Amended: 1982/98/99
- Factories and Commercial Premises Act Amended: 1983/89
- Flags, Emblems, and Names Protection Act Amended: 1985/98/99/2003/05
- Food Act 1981 Amended: 1985/96/2002
- Holidays Act Amended: 1983/90/91/2004
- Mangere Lawn Cemetery Trustees Empowering Act
- Medicines Act Amended: 1985/87/89/90/92/94/99/2003/05
- Methodist Church Withells Road Cemetery Empowering Act
- Music Teachers Act
- New Zealand Railways Corporation Act Amended: 1983/85/87/88/89/2003
- Otago Harbour Board Vesting, Reclamation, and Empowering Act
- Pehiaweri Maori Church and Marae Site Vesting Act
- Petroleum Demand Restraint Act
- Phosphate Commission of New Zealand Act Amended: 1982/86
- Psychologists Act Amended: 1994/99
- Summary Offences Act Amended: 1982/86/87/89/97/98/99
- Tauranga Moana Maori Trust Board Act
- Thames-Coromandel District Council Ambulance Levy Act
- Wine Makers Act Amended: 1982/83/85/2000/03
- Winton Holdings Licensing Act

Plus 115 acts amended

=== 1982 ===
- Canterbury Agricultural and Pastoral Association Empowering Act
- Cornwall Park Endowment and Recreation Land Act
- Dog Control and Hydatids Act Amended: 1983/85/88/92
- Domestic Protection Act Amended: 1983/85/86/87/94
- Friendly Societies and Credit Unions Act Amended: 1985/87/2004/06/07
- Gas Act Amended: 1987/93/97/2000/01/03/04/06/07
- Invercargill City Council Vesting and Empowering Act
- New Zealand Guardian Trust Company Act Amended: 1989/2001/05
- Noise Control Act Amended: 1987
- Official Information Act Amended: 1983/87/89/92/93/2003
- Papa Adoption Discharge Act
- Pork Industry Board Act Amended: 1987/88/2001
- Quarries and Tunnels Act
- Westpac Banking Corporation Act

Plus 136 acts amended

=== 1983 ===
- Administrator's Powers Act
- Apprenticeship Act Amended: 1985/91
- Area Health Boards Act Amended: 1985/86/88/89/90/91/92
- Auckland Harbour Bridge Authority Dissolution Act Amended: 1988
- Dannevirke and District Soldiers' Institute Dissolution Act
- Dilworth Trustees Empowering Act
- Films Act Amended: 1985/87/90
- Fisheries Act 1983 Amended: 1908/12/14/23/26/36/45/48/53/56/59/62/63/64/65/67/68/69/70/71/72/74/75/77/79/80/81/82/86/90/91/92/93/94/95/2000/01/02/04
- Foreign Affairs and Overseas Service Act Amended: 1986
- Forestry Rights Registration Act Amended: 1993/94/95/98
- Government Life Insurance Corporation Act
- Hakataramea Public Hall Trustees Empowering Act
- Health Service Personnel Act Amended: 1985/87
- New Zealand Forestry Council Act
- Trustee Banks Act

Plus 139 acts amended

=== 1984 ===
- The Statutes of New Zealand Act
- Whangarei Refinery Expansion Project Disputes Act

Plus 6 acts amended

== See also ==
The above list may not be current and will contain errors and omissions. For more accurate information try:

- Walter Monro Wilson, The Practical Statutes of New Zealand, Auckland: Wayte and Batger 1867
- The Knowledge Basket: Legislation NZ
- New Zealand Legislation Includes some imperial and provincial acts. Only includes acts currently in force, and as amended.
- Legislation Direct List of statutes from 2003 to order
