= Long Range =

Long Range may refer to:

- Long range shooting, a collective term for shooting at such long distances that various atmospheric conditions becomes equally important as pure shooting skills
- Long Range Aviation (disambiguation), branches of the armed forces responsible for delivering long-range nuclear or conventional strikes by aircraft
- Long Range Weapons Establishment, military facility in Woomera, Australia
- Long-range dependency
- Long Range Mountains
- Long-range order
- Long-range penetration
- Long-range surveillance
- Long-range Wi-Fi

== Other uses ==
- Long Range (G.I. Joe), a fictional character in the G.I. Joe universe
