= Libel Act =

Stock short title used for UK legislation

Libel Act (with its variations) is a stock short title which was formerly used for legislation in the United Kingdom relating to libel (including criminal libel).

The bill for an act with this short title will have been known as a Libel Bill during its passage through Parliament.

Libel Acts may be a generic name either for legislation bearing that short title or for all legislation which relates to libel.

== List ==
=== United Kingdom ===
- The Libel Act 1792 (32 Geo. 3. c. 60)
- The Criminal Libel Act 1819 (60 Geo. 3 & 1 Geo. 4. c. 8)
- The Libel Act 1843 (6 & 7 Vict. c. 96)
- The Libel Act 1845 (8 & 9 Vict. c. 75)
- The Newspaper Libel and Registration Act 1881 (44 & 45 Vict. c. 60)
- The Law of Libel Amendment Act 1888 (51 & 52 Vict. c. 64)

== See also ==
- Defamation Act
- List of short titles
