= Legislative Council of India =

Legislative Council of India may refer to:

- Council of India, advisors to British India from 1833 to 1935
- Imperial Legislative Council, a legislature for British India from 1861 to 1947
- Council of State (India), the upper house of the Indian legislature from 1920 to 1946
- State legislative councils of India, the upper houses of several state legislatures in present-day India

== See also ==
- Indian Council (disambiguation)
- Legislative council, with a list of bodies including some in India
