= Official Languages Act =

Official Languages Act, Official Language Act, or Official Languages Ordinance may refer to laws in different countries relating to an official language or languages:

== Canada ==
- the Official Languages Act (Canada) passed by the federal Parliament to enshrine official bilingualism;
- the Official Languages Act (New Brunswick);
- the Official Languages Act (Northwest Territories);
- the Official Language Act (Quebec), passed to ensure that French retained its primary status.

== Hong Kong ==
- the Official Languages Ordinance passed in Hong Kong in 1974 to bring the English and Chinese languages to equal status as official languages of the territory;

== India ==
- the Official Languages Act, 1963 passed to indefinitely extend the status of English as an official language of India;

== Ireland ==
- the Official Languages Act 2003 passed to promote the provision of state services in Irish;

== South Africa ==
- Use of Official Languages Act, 2012

== Sri Lanka ==
- Official Language Act No. 33 of 1956 (Ceylon), which replaced English with Sinhala as the official language of the country.

== Wales ==
- National Assembly for Wales (Official Languages) Act 2012
