= Children Act =

Stock short title used for legislation

Children Act (with its variations) is a stock short title used for the legislation in various countries relating to the welfare and protection of children. It may also be used as a generic name for all legislation relating to children. The Bill for an Act with this short title will usually have been known as a Children Bill during its passage through Parliament.

== Ireland ==
- The Children Act 2001

== Malaysia ==
- The Children and Young Persons Act 1947
- The Children and Young Persons (Employment) Act 1966
- The Child Act 2001

== United Kingdom ==
- The Children Act 1908 (8 Edw. 7. c. 67)
- The Children Act 1948 (11 & 12 Geo. 6. c. 43)
- The Children Act 1958 (6 & 7 Eliz. 2. c. 65)
- The Children Act 1972 (c. 44)
- The Children Act 1975 (c. 72)
- The Children Act 1989 (c. 41)
- The Children (Leaving Care) Act 2000 (c. 35)
- The Children Act 2004 (c. 31)
- The Children and Adoption Act 2006 (c. 20)
- The Children, Schools and Families Act 2010 (c. 26)
- The Children and Families Act 2014 (c. 6)
- The Children and Social Work Act 2017 (c. 16)

=== Northern Ireland ===
- The Children (Leaving Care) Act (Northern Ireland) 2002 (c. 11 (N.I.))

=== Scotland ===
- The Children (Scotland) Act 1995 (c. 36)
- The Children's Hearings (Scotland) Act 2011 (asp 1)
- The Children and Young People (Scotland) Act 2014 (asp 8)
- The Children (Scotland) Act 2020 (asp 16)
- The Children (Care and Justice) (Scotland) Act 2024 (asp 5)

=== Wales ===
- The Children and Families (Wales) Measure 2010 (nawm 1)

== See also ==
- The Children Act, a novel by Ian McEwan
- The Children Act, a film by Richard Eyre based on the novel
- List of short titles
