= Employment Relations Act =

Stock short title for legislation

Employment Relations Act (with its variations) is a stock short title used in New Zealand and in the United Kingdom for legislation relating to employment relations.

== List ==
=== New Zealand ===
- The Employment Relations Act 2000 (No 24)
- The Employment Relations (Validation of Union Registration and Other Matters) Amendment Act 2001 (No 91)
- The Employment Relations Amendment Act 2004 (No 43)
- The Employment Relations Amendment Act (No 2) 2004 (No 86)
- The Employment Relations Amendment Act 2006 (No 41)
- The Employment Relations Amendment Act 2007 (No 2)
- The Employment Relations (Flexible Working Arrangements) Amendment Act 2007 (No 105)
- The Employment Relations (Breaks, Infant Feeding, and Other Matters) Amendment Act 2008 (No 58)
- The Employment Relations Amendment Act 2008 (No 106)
- The Employment Relations (Film Production Work) Amendment Act 2010 (No 120)
- The Employment Relations Amendment Act 2010 (No 125)

=== United Kingdom ===
- The Employment Relations Act 1999 (c. 26)
- The Employment Relations Act 2004 (c. 24)

== See also ==
- List of short titles
