= Environmental Protection Act =

Environmental Protection Act or Environment Protection Act may refer to:

== Australia ==
- Environmental Protection Act 1986, which governs the Environmental Protection Authority of Western Australia
- Environment Protection Act 1993 in South Australia
- Environment Protection and Biodiversity Conservation Act 1999, known as the EPBC Act, in Australia

== Other countries ==
- Canadian Environmental Protection Act, 1999
- Environmental Protection Act 1990 in the United Kingdom
- Environmental Protection Act (Ontario) in the Canadian province of Ontario

== See also ==
- Environmental protection
- Environment Act (disambiguation)
