= Quarantine Act =

Quarantine Act may refer to:

- Quarantine Act 1710 (9 Ann. c. 2), an act of the Parliament of Great Britain
- Quarantine Act 1721 (8 Geo. 1. c. 10), an act of the Parliament of Great Britain
- Quarantine Act 1908, an act of the Parliament of Australia
- Quarantine Act, 2005, an act of the Parliament of Canada
