= Powers of Attorney Act =

Powers of Attorney Act is a short title for various pieces of legislation in the United Kingdom.

- Evidence and Powers of Attorney Act 1940 (3 & 4 Geo. 6. c. 28)
- Evidence and Powers of Attorney Act 1943 (6 & 7 Geo. 6. c. 18)
- Powers of Attorney Act 1971 (c. 27)
- Powers of Attorney Act (Northern Ireland) 1971 (c. 18)
- Enduring Powers of Attorney Act 1985 (c. 28)
- Powers of Attorney Act 2023 (c. 42)
