= Provincial council =

Provincial council may refer to:

== Government ==
- Provincial council (Belgium), the assembly of the ten provinces of Belgium
- Provincial councils of Sri Lanka, government bodies for the nine provinces of Sri Lanka
- Provincial Council (Italy), municipal legislative bodies in Italy
- Provincial council (Netherlands), provincial parliament and legislative assembly in the provinces of the Netherlands
- Provincial Councils of New Zealand, former governing bodies of the Provinces of New Zealand (1853–1876)
- Provincial council (South Africa), a former governing body of each of the four South African provinces (1910–1986)
- Provincial council (Spain), governing body for a Spanish province
- Greenland Provincial Council, former local government bodies in Greenland
- Pennsylvania Provincial Council, a parliamentary body in the Province of Pennsylvania, in British North America (1682–1776)
- Sangguniang Panlalawigan (literally "provincial council"; known in English as Provincial Board), legislatures of the provinces in the Philippines
- Taiwan Provincial Council, also known as Taiwan Provincial Consultative Council, defunct government body in Taiwan

== Other ==
- Provincial council (Gaelic games), a body within Gaelic games which consists of several counties
- Provincial councils in Catholicism, a local ecclesiastical synod
- Provincial Councils of Baltimore, 19th-century councils of Roman Catholic bishops in Baltimore, Maryland, US
