= Government of Ireland Act =

Government of Ireland Act may refer to:

- Government of Ireland Act 1914 (4 & 5 Geo. 5. c. 90), an act passed by the Parliament of the United Kingdom intended to provide home rule (self-government within the United Kingdom) for Ireland
- Government of Ireland Act 1920 (10 & 11 Geo. 5. c. 67), an act of the Parliament of the United Kingdom, intended to partition Ireland into two self-governing polities: the six north-eastern counties were to form "Northern Ireland", while the larger part of the country was to form "Southern Ireland"
