= London Government Act =

London Government Act may refer to:

- London Government Act 1899 (62 & 63 Vict. c. 14)
- London Government Act 1939 (2 & 3 Geo. 6. c. 40)
- London Government Act 1963 (c. 33)
