= Church of England Act =

Stock short title used for UK legislation

Church of England Act and Church of England Measure (with its many variations) are stock short titles used for legislation.

== Acts of the Parliament of the United Kingdom ==
- Church of England Life and Fire Assurance Trust and Annuity Company Act 1841 (4 & 5 Vict. c. xcii)
- Church of England Assembly (Powers) Act 1919 (9 & 10 Geo. 5. c. 76)
- Presbyterian Church of England Act 1960 (8 & 9 Eliz. 2. c. xxxii)
- Church of England Convocations Act 1966 (c. 2)

== Church of England measures ==
- Church of England (Worship and Doctrine) Measure 1974 (No. 3)
- Church of England (Miscellaneous Provisions) Measure 1976 (No. 3)
- Church of England (Miscellaneous Provisions) Measure 1978 (No. 3)
- Church of England (Miscellaneous Provisions) Measure 1983 (No. 2)
- Church of England (Legal Aid and Miscellaneous Provisions) Measure 1988 (No. 1)
- Church of England (Ecumenical Relations) Measure 1988 (No. 3)
- Church of England (Pensions) Measure 1988 (No. 4)
- Church of England (Miscellaneous Provisions) Measure 1992 (No. 1)
- Church of England (Legal Aid) Measure 1994 (No. 3)
- Church of England (Miscellaneous Provisions) Measure 1995 (No. 2)
- Church of England (Miscellaneous Provisions) Measure 2000 (No. 1)
- Church of England (Pensions) Measure 2003 (No. 2)
- Church of England (Miscellaneous Provisions) Measure 2005 (No. 3)
- Church of England (Miscellaneous Provisions) Measure 2006 (No. 1)
- Church of England Marriage Measure 2008 (No. 1)
- Church of England Pensions (Amendment) Measure 2009 (No. 2)
- Church of England (Miscellaneous Provisions) Measure 2010 (No. 1)
- Church of England Marriage (Amendment) Measure 2012 (No. 1)
- Church of England (Miscellaneous Provisions) Measure 2014 (No. 1)
- Church of England (Pensions) (Amendment) Measure 2015 (No. 3)
- Church of England (Miscellaneous Provisions) Measure 2018 (No. 7)
- Church of England Pensions Measure 2018 (No. 9)
- Church of England (Miscellaneous Provisions) Measure 2020 (No. 1)
- Church of England (Miscellaneous Provisions) Measure 2024 (No. 1)
- Church of England Pensions (Application of Capital Funds) Measure 2024 (No. 2)

== See also ==
- List of Church of England measures
