= Official Information Act =

Official Information Act may refer to:

- Official Information Act 1982 in New Zealand
- Official Information Act 2008 in the Cook Islands
