= Child Act 2001 =

Malaysian law on children

Parliament of Malaysia
- Long title: An Act to consolidate and amend the laws relating to the care, protection and rehabilitation of children and to provide for matters connected therewith and incidental thereto.
- Citation: Act 611
- Territorial extent: Throughout Malaysia
- Passed by: Dewan Rakyat
- Passed: 17 October 2000
- Passed by: Dewan Negara
- Passed: 18 December 2000
- Royal assent: 15 February 2001
- Commenced: 1 March 2001
- Effective: 1 August 2002, P.U. (B) 229/2002

Legislative history

Initiating chamber: Dewan Rakyat
- Bill title: Child Bill 2000
- Bill citation: D.R. 27/2000
- Introduced by: Siti Zaharah Sulaiman, Minister of National Unity and Community Development
- First reading: 17 July 2000
- Second reading: 16 October 2000
- Third reading: 17 October 2000

Revising chamber: Dewan Negara
- Bill title: Child Bill 2000
- Bill citation: D.R. 27/2000
- Member(s) in charge: S. Veerasingam, Parliamentary Secretary to the Minister of National Unity and Community Development
- First reading: 6 December 2000
- Second reading: 18 December 2000
- Third reading: 18 December 2000

Amended by
- Child (Modification) Order 2003 [P.U. (A) 7/2003]

Related legislation
- United Nations Convention on the Rights of the Child; Juvenile Courts Act 1947 [Act 90] Women and Girls Protection Act 1973 [Act 106] Child Protection Act 1991 [Act 468]

Keywords
- Child protection, child development
- Status: In force

The Child Act 2001 (Malay: Akta Kanak-Kanak 2001) is a Malaysian law which served to consolidate the Juvenile Courts Act 1947 [Act 90], the Women and Girls Protection Act 1973 [Act 106], and the Child Protection Act 1991 [Act 468]. It was enacted partially in order to fulfil Malaysia's obligations under the United Nations Convention on the Rights of the Child. However, it retains the option of corporal punishment for child offenders. In December 2004, members of the legal community suggested that the law needed review, despite its newness, in order to clarify its criminal procedures. One example of the Act's unclarity was brought to light in a 2007 case involving a 13-year-old convicted of murder. Under Section 97(1) of the Act, capital punishment may not be applied to children; Sections 97(2), 97(3), and 97(4) make provisions for alternative punishments for offences which would result in the death penalty if committed by adults, namely detention at the pleasure of the Yang di-Pertuan Agong. However, Section 97(2) was overturned by the Court of Appeal in July 2007 on the grounds that it violated the Constitution of Malaysia's doctrine of separation of powers, leading to the situation that no punishment at all could be rendered.

The Act was meant to give further protection to child offenders. There are, however, a number of shortcomings missing from the Act. Besides the uncertainty of detention period under Section 97, another omission is the maximum length of the remand order. For an adult offender, Section 117 of the Criminal Procedure Code provides for a maximum of 14 days remand. Section 84(2) of the Child Act simply allows the court to make a remand order without prescribing the maximum length of remand. This problem was subsequently remedied in a 2003 case which held that the Criminal Procedure Code would govern the remand period of a child.

With regard to the trial procedure, an adult accused has the option to give a sworn evidence, unsworn evidence, or remain silent. The Child Act does not provide for any right to remain silent. Section 90(9) merely allows the child to give sworn or unsworn evidence.

== Additional protection ==
The Act has provided extra protection for a child offender especially with regards to the privacy of the child. The trial for the Court for Children shall be in closed court (in camera). Only certain specified persons are allowed to attend the trial. There now a legal duty for the parents of the child to attend the trial.

It also contains provisions to protect the child from associating with adult offenders in prison or elsewhere.

== Preamble ==
Preamble of the Act provides the following recognitions and acknowledgements:

1. RECOGNIZING that the country’s vision of a fully developed nation is one where social justice and moral, ethical and spiritual developments are just as important as economic development in creating a civil Malaysian society which is united, progressive, peaceful, caring, just and humane
2. RECOGNIZING that a child is not only a crucial component of such a society but also the key to its survival, development and prosperity
3. ACKNOWLEDGING that a child, by reason of his physical, mental and emotional immaturity, is in need of special safeguards, care and assistance, after birth, to enable him to participate in and contribute positively towards the attainment of the ideals of a civil Malaysian society
4. RECOGNIZING every child is entitled to protection and assistance in all circumstances without regard to distinction of any kind, such as race, colour, sex, language, religion, social origin or physical, mental or emotional disabilities or any other status
5. ACKNOWLEDGING the family as the fundamental group in society which provides the natural environment for the growth, support and well-being of all its members, particularly children, so that they may develop in an environment of peace, happiness, love and understanding in order to attain the full confidence, dignity and worth of the human person
6. RECOGNIZING the role and responsibility of the family in society, that they be afforded the necessary assistance to enable them to fully assume their responsibilities as the source of care, support, rehabilitation and development of children in society

== Structure ==
The Child Act 2001, in its current form (1 January 2006), consists of 15 Parts containing 135 sections and 2 schedules (including 1 amendment).

- Part I: Preliminary
- Part II: Co-ordinating Council for the Protection of Children
- Part III: Appointment of Protector, etc.
- Part IV: Courts for Children
- Part V: Children in Need of Care and Protection
  - Chapter 1: General
  - Chapter 2: Temporary Custody and Medical Examination and Treatment
  - Chapter 3: Offences in Relation to the Health and Welfare of Children
  - Chapter 4: Notification on Taking a Child into Care, Custody or Control
- Part VI: Children in Need of Protection and Rehabilitation
  - Chapter 1: General
  - Chapter 2: Offences
- Part VII: Beyond Control
- Part VIII: Trafficking in and Abduction of Children
- Part IX: Institutions
  - Chapter 1: Places of Safety and Places of Refuge
  - Chapter 2: Places of Detention
  - Chapter 3: Probation Hostels
  - Chapter 4: Approved Schools
  - Chapter 5: Henry Gurney Schools
  - Chapter 6: Special Provisions in Relation to Places of Safety, Places of Refuge, Places of Detention, Probation Hostels, Approved Schools and Henry Gurney Schools
  - Chapter 7: Miscellaneous
- Part X: Criminal Procedure in Court for Children
  - Chapter 1: Charge, Bail, etc.
  - Chapter 2: Trials
  - Chapter 3: Powers of the Court for Children at the Conclusion of Trial
  - Chapter 4: Probation
- Part XI: In the Care of Fit and Proper Person
- Part XII: Contribution Orders
- Part XIII: Miscellaneous, Arrest, Search, Seizure, etc.
- Part XIV: Miscellaneous
- Part XV: Savings and Transitional Provisions
- Schedules

== First Schedule ==
[Paragraphs 15(1)(c) and 17(1)(i)]

Offences under sections 299 to 301, 304 to 304A, 305 to 309A, 312 to 319, 321 to 322, 324, 326 to 340, 345 to 351, 353 to 358, 360 to 362, 364 to

373A, 374 to 375, 377, 377A, 377C to 377E of the Penal Code.

== Second Schedule ==
[Section 45]

1. Offences punishable under Part VI of this Act.

2. Offences—

(a) punishable under sections 309, 312 to 313, 354, 370 to 373, 373A, 376 to 377 of the Penal Code; or

(b) involving any acts or matters defined in sections 321 to 322, 339 to 340, 350 to 351, 360 to 362 of the Penal Code.

== See also ==
- Children Act
