= Indian Councils Act =

Indian Councils Act refers to acts passed by the Parliament of the United Kingdom regarding colonial India:

- Indian Councils Act 1861 (24 & 25 Vict. c. 67)
- Indian Councils Act 1892 (55 & 56 Vict. c. 14)
- Indian Councils Act 1909 (9 Edw. 7. c. 4)

== See also ==
- Indian Council (disambiguation)
- Government of India Act (disambiguation)
