= Biosecurity Act =

Biosecurity Act may refer to:

- Biosecurity Act 1993, New Zealand
- Biosecurity Act 2015, Australia
