= Vatican Council =

Vatican Council may refer to:

- First Vatican Council (1869–1870), the 20th ecumenical council of the Catholic Church
- Second Vatican Council (1962–1965), the 21st ecumenical council of the Catholic Church
