= Equality Act =

Equality Act may refer to:

- Equality Act 2006 (c. 3), an act of Parliament of the United Kingdom, which established the Equality and Human Rights Commission
- Equality Act 2010 (c. 15), an act of Parliament of the United Kingdom, with the same goals as the four major EU Equal Treatment Directives
- Equality Act (United States), a bill in the United States Congress that would ban discrimination on the basis of sexual orientation and gender identity
- Promotion of Equality and Prevention of Unfair Discrimination Act, 2000, commonly referred to as the Equality Act, an Act of Parliament of South Africa

== See also ==
- Race Relations Act (disambiguation), predecessor Acts of the Parliament of the United Kingdom
- Equal Treatment Directive 2006/54/EC, related to employment law
