= Carriage of Goods Act 1979 =

Act of Parliament in New Zealand

The Carriage of Goods Act 1979

New Zealand Parliament
- Royal assent: 14 November 1979
- Status: Repealed

The Carriage of Goods Act 1979 (No 43) was an act of the New Zealand Parliament. It was repealed by section 345(1)(a) of the Contract and Commercial Law Act 2017.

The Carriage of Goods Act 1979 replaced the Carriers Act 1948.
