= Church of Scotland Act =

Church of Scotland Act may refer to:

- the Church of Scotland Act 1824 (5 Geo. 4. c. 90)
- the Church of Scotland Act 1921 (11 & 12 Geo. 5. c. 29)
- the Church of Scotland (Lord High Commissioner) Act 2025 (c. 9)
