= Greater London Authority Act =

Greater London Authority Act may refer to:

- Greater London Authority (Referendum) Act 1998 (c. 3)
- Greater London Authority Act 1999 (c. 29)
- Greater London Authority Act 2007 (c. 24)
