= Environment Act =

Environment Act may refer to:

== New Zealand ==
- Environment Act 1986 in New Zealand

== United Kingdom ==
- Environment Act 1995 (c. 25)
- Environment (Air Quality and Soundscapes) (Wales) Act 2024 (asc 2)
- Environment (Wales) Act 2016 (anaw 3)
- Environment Act 2021 (c. 30)

== See also ==
- Department of the Environment Act (Canada)
- Environment Effects Act 1978 in the Australian state of Victoria
- Environmental Protection Act (disambiguation)
- Environment (biophysical)
