= Indian Council of Education =

- Abbreviation: ICE
- Formation: 1985; 41 years ago
- Type: NGO
- Legal status: Active
- Purpose: Educational and Women Development
- Headquarters: New Delhi, India
- Website: http://www.ice-online.org

Indian Council of Education is a non-profit, non-governmental and an international organisation based in India. It focuses and works for the masses in the subject of education], health, welfare and human rights. It has the ECOSOC status with the United Nations for working in the field of education and women development. Its head office is in New Delhi with certain offices in North America and Europe and affiliate offices in Asia and Africa.

== History ==
I.C.E. was set up in 1985 with intention of working in the matter of social consciousness of the masses. It lays emphasis on the economically weaker and socially backward sections of the Indian society in order to acquaint them with the importance and significance of education as a weapon of economic, cultural and social change. The organisation encourages citizens on issues against social problems and injustice so as to improve and rectify the quality of human life.

== Mission ==
Due to the rising problems related to alcoholism, drug abuse and health problems in educational institutions, the organisation took up the initiative of creating awareness and building community education, identification, referral, counselling and de-addiction, treatment and rehabilitation of drug addicts and developing medical assistance to the weaker societies. Apart from the ones mentioned, the council also pays attention to welfare, human rights and women's development.

== Projects ==
- I.C.E. has been developing a school with residence facility and technical university in the district of Mewat, an underdeveloped area in Haryana, India.
- I.C.E. will be establishing gynecological and pediatric hospital in Mewat.
- I.C.E. in collaboration with an international organisation will be launching mobile dispensaries with Mobile Health Check-up Van for 10 villages in India.

== Publications ==
The Research Publications of the magazines of the organisation as follows:

- The Status Report on the Problems faced by Elderly in India 2006
- International Terrorism and its Ramifications, 2007
- Need for Right to Education in India- A study of School Drop-outs 2007
- United Nations in the New World Order, January 2008
- Child Labour in South Asia, 2008.
- Women Empowerment and right to participation in Elections- A case Study of India 2009
- New Asia-Africa Strategic Partnership, 2009

== Participation ==
Following are the United Nations Meetings attended by the council:

- Social Forum 2006 with a focus on the fight against poverty and the right to participation: the role of women.
- Social Forum 2005 on "Poverty and economic growth: challenges to human rights."
- High Level Segment Meeting of ECOSOC in New York, USA in June–July 2008
- 2009 Social Forum on Poverty Eradication Strategies (31 August-2 September 2009) in Geneva, Switzerland.

Participation in 2009:

- Protect children in South Asia in Kathmandu Nepal, 20 January 2009.
- Caste Based Discrimination in Jesus of Mary College, New Delhi 30 April 2009.
- Negative Impact of Globalisation, India International Centre, New Delhi 2–3 March 2009, India.
- Minority Rights in India, at AMU, Aligarh, India 18 September 2009.

Participation in 2008:

- Human Rights Situation in Nepal, India Habitat Centre New Delhi, India, 27–28 February 2008.
- Human Rights and Development, Kashi Vidyapith Varanasi, 22 February 2008, India.
- Rights of Food in developing countries, Department of Social Work, Delhi University, 7–8 March 2008
- Fight Against Extreme Poverty, Nirmala Niketan, Mumbai, India, 8 May 2008.

Participation in 2007:

- Domestic Violence in South Asia .Discussion organised in DAV College Delhi University 2007
- Combating Torture,- A Human Right Approach, 10 January 2007, New Delhi, India.
- Right to Development, IIT New Delhi, 10–11 March 2007.
- Democracy, Human Rights and Social Development 30 April 2007 Himachal Pradesh University, India.

== Executive team ==
- President: Dr. (Mrs) Pramila Srivastava
- Vice President: Prof. Anjali Gandhi
- Vice President Prof. Masooma Ali
- Director Operations: Mr. Rahul Malhotra
- Director Finance: Mr. B P Sharma
- Senior Researcher: Mr. Rahul Gupta
- Research Fellow: Mr. Mihir Choudhary
- Research Fellow: Mr. Kshitij Chopra
- Research Fellow: Mr. Ashish Choudhary
