= Online Safety Act =

Online Safety Act may refer to:

- Online Safety Act 2023 (c. 50), 2023 United Kingdom legislation
- Online Safety Act 2021, 2021 Australian legislation
  - A subsequent 2024 amendment banning social media for minors under the age of 16, the Online Safety Amendment (Social Media Minimum Age) Act 2024
- Kids Online Safety Act (KOSA), proposed United States federal legislation
- Online Safety Act (Sri Lanka), 2024 Sri Lankan legislation
