= Elections Act =

Elections Act may refer to:

- Canada Elections Act, 2000
- Elections Act 2001 (c. 7), UK
- Elections Act 2022 (c. 37), UK
- Elections Act 1958, Malaysia
- Elections ACT is the branding of the Australian Capital Territory Electoral Commission
