= Coronavirus Act =

Coronavirus Act may refer to

- Coronavirus Act 2020 (c. 7), act of the Parliament of the United Kingdom
- Coronavirus (Scotland) Act 2020 (asp 7), act of the Scottish Parliament
- Coronavirus (Recovery and Reform) (Scotland) Act 2022 (asp 8), act of the Scottish Parliament
