= Awa mountain =

Mountain range in Yunnan, China

Coordinates: 23°40′50″N 98°52′15″E

Awa Mountain, also Ava Mountain, straddles the border of northern Myanmar and China. The majority of the Wa people live in Awa.

According to 中國西南邊疆變遷史, the Awa mountain range looks north to the southern part of the downstream Panting river, south to the Salween South River confluence and east to the Nu River and Lancing River watershed .
