= International Copyright Act =

Stock short title used for legislation

International Copyright Act is a stock short title used for legislation in the United Kingdom and the United States which relates to foreign copyright.

== List ==
=== United Kingdom ===
The International Copyright Act 1844 (7 & 8 Vict. c. 12)
The International Copyright Act 1852 (15 & 16 Vict. c. 12)
The Fine Arts Copyright Act 1862 (25 & 26 Vict. c. 68)
The International Copyright Act 1875 (38 & 39 Vict. c. 12)
The International Copyright Act 1886 (49 & 50 Vict. c. 33)

The International Copyright Acts is the collective title of the International Copyright Act 1844, the International Copyright Act 1852, the Fine Arts Copyright Act 1862, the International Copyright Act 1875, and the International Copyright Act 1886.

=== United States ===
The International Copyright Act of 1891

== See also ==
List of short titles
