= Awa (given name) =

Awa (or Hawa) is an African feminine given name derived from Eve

- Awa Marie Coll Seck
- Awa Dia (born 2005), Senegalese-American Neo City Ambassador
- Awa Dioum-Ndiaye (born 1961), Senegalese retired female track and field athlete
- Awa Fam (born 2006), Spanish basketball player
- Awa Gueye (born August 1978), Senegalese women's basketball player
- Awa Santesson-Sey (born 1997), Swedish singer

Hawa

- Hawa Ghasia, Tanzanian politician
- Hawa Yakubu (1948–2007), Ghanaian politician
- Zainab Hawa Bangura, Sierra Leona politician

Awa is also a New Zealand Māori word that means 'river' often used in given names or part of a name. It can appear in both female and male names. Te Awanui can be directly translated as 'The Big River' or 'The Main River'.
