= Digital Economy Act =

Digital Economy Act may refer to

- Digital Economy Act 2010 (c. 24)
- Digital Economy Act 2017 (c. 30)
