= Regulatory Reform Act =

The Regulatory Reform Act may refer to either of three Acts of the Parliament of the United Kingdom, or one Act of the Scottish Parliament:

- Regulatory Reform Act 2001 (c. 6)
- Legislative and Regulatory Reform Act 2006 (c. 51)
- Enterprise and Regulatory Reform Act 2013 (c. 24)
- Regulatory Reform (Scotland) Act 2014 (asp 3)

== See also ==
- List of regulatory reform orders
