= Long Range Aviation =

Long Range Aviation may refer to the following:

- Soviet Long Range Aviation, the branch of the Soviet Air Force responsible for long-range nuclear or conventional strikes by aircraft, until the dissolution of the Soviet Union in 1991
- Ukrainian Long Range Aviation, the successor organization in Ukraine after the fall of the Soviet Union, disbanded in 2007
- Russian Long Range Aviation, the successor organization in Russia after the fall of the Soviet Union

== See also ==
- long-haul, a flight length defined as between 6–16 hours
- Long Range (disambiguation)
