= Race Relations Act =

Race Relations Act or Race Relations Order may refer to

- The Race Relations Act 1965 (c. 73)
- The Race Relations Act 1968 (c. 71)
- The Race Relations Act 1976 (c. 74)
- The Race Relations (Amendment) Act 2000 (c. 34)
- The Race Relations (Northern Ireland) Order 1997 (SI 1997/869)

== See also ==
- Equality Act (disambiguation)
