= Human Fertilisation and Embryology Act =

Human Fertilisation and Embryology Act can refer to the following acts of the Parliament of the United Kingdom:

- Human Fertilisation and Embryology Act 1990 (c. 37)
- Human Fertilisation and Embryology (Deceased Fathers) Act 2003 (c. 24)
- Human Fertilisation and Embryology Act 2008 (c. 22), which updated and revised the 1990 act
