= Gwichʼin language =

Athabaskan language

Gwichʼin
- Dinjii Zhuʼ Ginjik
- Native to: Canada, United States
- Region: Canada (Northwest Territories, Yukon), United States (Alaska)
- Ethnicity: 3,000 Gwichʼin people (2007)
- Native speakers: c. 560 (2007–2016)
- Language family: Na-Dené: Athabaskan; Northern Athabaskan; Gwichʼin
- Dialects: Western; Eastern
- Writing system: Latin (Northern Athabaskan alphabet)

Official status
- Official language in: Canada (Northwest Territories); United States (Alaska)

Language codes
- ISO 639-2: gwi
- ISO 639-3: gwi
- Glottolog: gwic1235
- ELP: Gwich'in
- Gwichʼin is classified as Severely Endangered by the UNESCO Atlas of the World's Languages in Danger.

- People: Dinjii Zhuu Gwichʼin
- Language: Dinjii Zhuh Kʼyuu
- Country: Gwichʼin Nành, Denendeh ᑌᓀᐣᑌᐧ

Allan Hayton reciting the story "Tǫǫ Oozhrii Zhìt Tsyaa Tsal Dhidii" (Boy in the Moon) in Gwichʼin

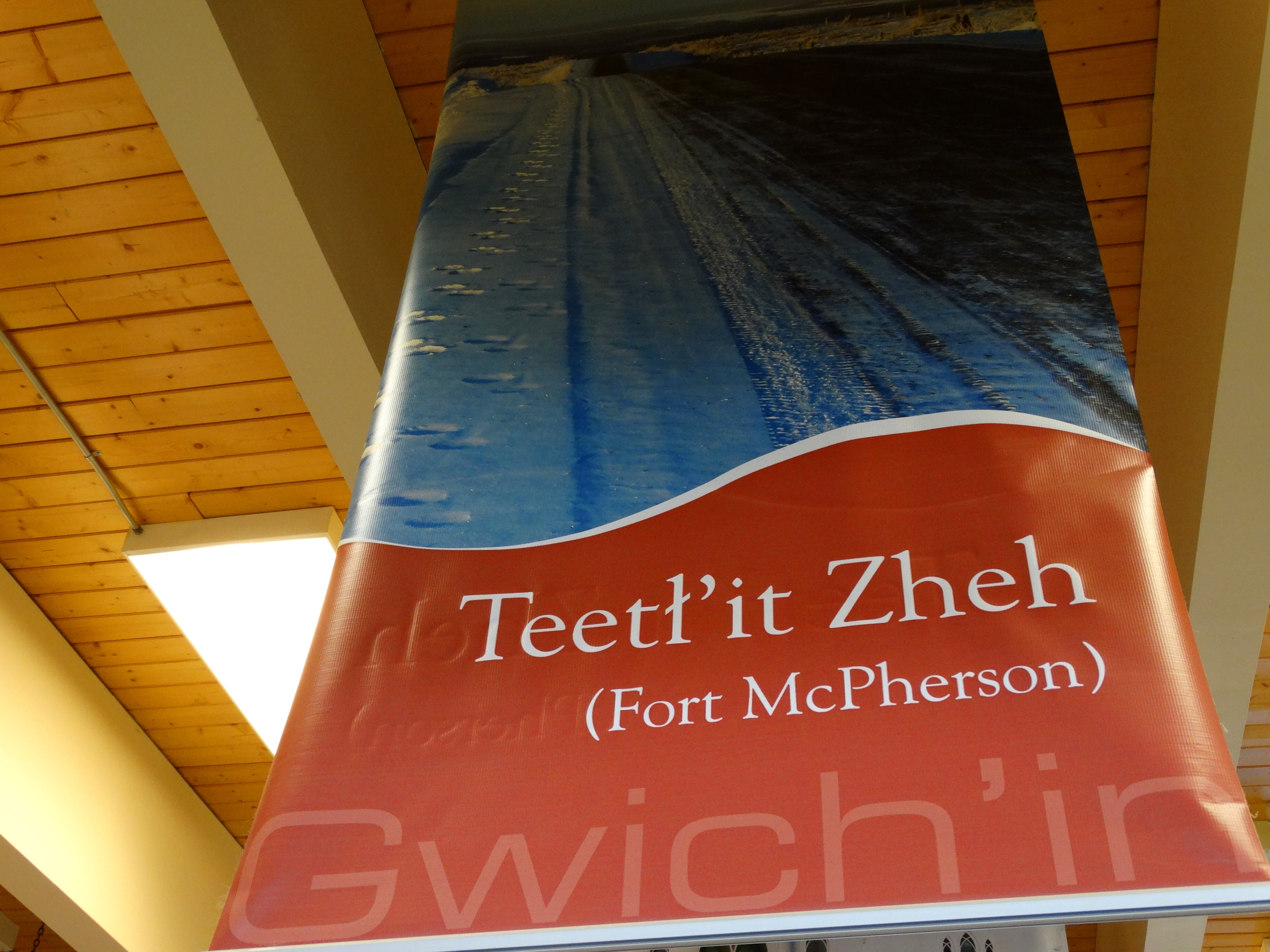
A sign in the Fort McPherson identifies the city by its original Gwichʼin name, Teetł'it Zheh.

Gwichʼin (Dinju Zhuh Kʼyuu) is an Athabaskan language spoken by the Gwichʼin First Nation (in Canada) and Alaska Native People (in the United States). It is also known in older or dialect-specific publications as Kutchin, Takudh, Tukudh, or Loucheux. Gwichʼin is spoken primarily in the towns of Inuvik, Aklavik, Fort McPherson (aka Teetłʼit Zheh), and Tsiigehtchic (formerly Arctic Red River), all in the Northwest Territories and Old Crow in Yukon of Canada. In Alaska of the United States, Gwichʼin is spoken in Fort Yukon, Chalkyitsik, Birch Creek, Venetie and Arctic Village.

== Current status ==
According to the UNESCO Interactive Atlas of the World's Languages in Danger, Gwichʼin is at present severely endangered. There are about 260 Gwichʼin speakers in Canada out of a total Gwichʼin population of 1,900. About 300 out of a total Alaska Gwichʼin population of 1,100 speak the language. Gwichʼin speakers have been shifting from their heritage language to English as the majority language of both the US and Canada.

=== Dialects ===
There are two main varieties of Gwichʼin, Eastern and Western, which are delineated roughly at the Canada–US border. There are several dialects within these subgroupings, including Fort Yukon Gwichʼin, Arctic Village Gwichʼin, Western Canada Gwichʼin (Takudh, Tukudh, Loucheux), and Arctic Red River. Each village has unique pronunciation features, vocabulary, and expressions.

Inhabitants of Old Crow in the northern Yukon speak a similar dialect to those bands living in Venetie and Arctic Village, Alaska. Kâachik and Tâachik dialects are spoken in Johnson Creek village.

=== Language preservation and documentation ===
In 1988, the NWT Official Languages Act named Gwichʼin an official language of the Northwest Territories, and the Official Languages of Alaska Law as amended declared Gwichʼin a recognized language in 2014.

The Gwichʼin language is taught regularly at the Chief Zzeh Gittlit School in Old Crow, Yukon.

Projects are underway to further document the language from a linguistic standpoint, and foster the writing and translation skills of younger Gwichʼin speakers. In one project, lead research associate and fluent speaker Gwichʼin elder Kenneth Frank works with linguists and young Gwichʼin speakers affiliated with the Alaska Native Language Center at the University of Alaska in Fairbanks to document traditional knowledge of caribou anatomy (Mishler and Frank 2020).

=== Residential schools and language decline ===
Assimilation efforts through residential schools played a factor in creating a cultural disruption and a language shift. One of the goals of residential schools was to wipe out indigenous culture and replace it with the European culture, seen as more conducive to “civilized” society. In the process, indigenous children were taken away from their families and placed in a dedicated school (“Indian Schools” in the US).

Indigenous children were often punished for speaking First-Nation languages, leading children to abandon their heritage languages. Residential schools caused major cultural disruption also among the Gwich’in.

== Phonology ==
=== Consonants ===
The consonants of Gwichʼin are shown in IPA notation below, with orthographic symbols in brackets:

		Labial	Inter- dental	Alveolar			Retroflex	Palatal	Velar		Glottal
		Labial	Inter- dental	plain	sibilant	lateral	Retroflex	Palatal	plain	labialized	Glottal
Plosive/ Affricate	plain	(p ⟨b⟩)	tθ ⟨ddh⟩	t ⟨d⟩	ts ⟨dz⟩	tɬ ⟨dl⟩	ʈʂ ⟨dr⟩	tʃ ⟨j⟩	k ⟨g⟩	kʷ ⟨gw⟩	ʔ ⟨ʼ⟩
Plosive/ Affricate	aspirated		tθʰ ⟨tth⟩	tʰ ⟨t⟩	tsʰ ⟨ts⟩	tɬʰ ⟨tl⟩	ʈʂʰ ⟨tr⟩	tʃʰ ⟨ch⟩	kʰ ⟨k⟩	kʷʰ ⟨kw⟩	
Plosive/ Affricate	ejective		tθʼ ⟨tthʼ⟩	tʼ ⟨tʼ⟩	tsʼ ⟨tsʼ⟩	tɬʼ ⟨tlʼ⟩	ʈʂʼ ⟨trʼ⟩	tʃʼ ⟨chʼ⟩	kʼ ⟨kʼ⟩		
Plosive/ Affricate	prenasalized			ⁿd ⟨nd⟩				ⁿdʒ ⟨nj⟩			
Fricative	voiced	v ⟨v⟩	ð ⟨dh⟩		z ⟨z⟩		ʐ ⟨zhr⟩	ʒ ⟨zh⟩	ɣ ⟨gh⟩	ɣʷ ⟨ghw⟩	
Fricative	voiceless	(f ⟨f⟩)	θ ⟨th⟩		s ⟨s⟩	ɬ ⟨ł⟩	ʂ ⟨shr⟩	ʃ ⟨sh⟩	x ⟨kh⟩	xʷ ⟨khw⟩	h ⟨h⟩
Sonorant	voiced	(m ⟨m⟩)		n ⟨n⟩		l ⟨l⟩	ɻ ⟨r⟩	j ⟨y⟩		w ⟨w⟩	
Sonorant	voiceless			n̥ ⟨nh⟩			ɻ̥ ⟨rh⟩				

=== Vowels ===
Gwich’in has five phonemic vowel qualities /i e a o u/ which contrast in duration, nasality, and tones.

	Front		Central		Back	
	short	long	short	long	short	long
Close	i ⟨i⟩	iː ⟨ii⟩			u ⟨u⟩	uː ⟨uu⟩
Mid	e ⟨e⟩	eː ⟨ee⟩			o ⟨o⟩	oː ⟨oo⟩
Open			a ⟨a⟩	aː ⟨aa⟩		

==== Allophonic variation ====
Short vowels show different vowel qualities from their long counterparts:

- /i/ occurs as [ɪ]
- /e/ occurs as [ɛ]
- /a/ occurs as [ə]
- /o/ occurs as [ɔ]
- /u/ occurs as [ʊ]

==== Tone and nasality ====
- Nasal vowels are marked with an ogonek, e.g. ⟨ą į ǫǫ⟩ for /ə̃́ ɪ̃́ ṍː/, respectively.
- Low tone is marked with a grave accent, e.g. ⟨à⟩, whereas high tones are never marked.

=== Syllable structure ===
Gwichʼin has moderate complexity of syllable structure, in which the maximal syllable shape is CCVC. However, no consonant clusters occur within a syllable besides /Cj/ onsets, as in /ɬjə̃́h/ łyąh “hook”, or -/tʰjɛ̀ʔ/ -tyèʼ “father” (i.e. /ʃɪ́tʰjɛ̀ʔ/ shityèʼ “my father”). Word-medially, two-consonant sequences may occur. All consonants may occur syllable-initially (i.e. in onset position), but syllable-finally, no ejective, retroflex, affricate, interdental or labialized consonants occur. In coda-position, fricatives are also restricted to the glottal, lateral, and non-sibilant consonants.

Coda consonants in Gwichʼin syllables
Coda			Example		English
Coda			IPA	Orthography	English
Stop	oral	-k	tɬə́k	dlak	“squirrel”
Stop	glottal	-ʔ	tsʰɛ́ʔ	tse’	“beaver”
Fricative	glottal	-h	ʒɛ́h	zheh	“house”
Fricative	lateral	-ɬ	tʃə́ɬ	jał	“fish hook”
Fricative	non-sibilant	-ð	tə́ʒə́ð	dazhadh	“fury”
Sonorant	nasal	-n	ʈʂɪ́n	drin	“day”
Sonorant	lateral	-l	ə́htʰə̀l	ahtàl	“grouse”
Sonorant	rhotic	-ɻ̥	tʰéːʒɪ́ɻ̥	teezhirh	“steam”

== Written Gwichʼin ==
The missionary Robert McDonald first started working on the written representation of Van Tat and Dagoo dialects Gwichʼin. He also produced a Bible and a hymn book which was written in Gwichʼin in 1898. McDonald used English orthography as his model when representing Gwichʼin. This was unusual for missionaries at the time: other missionaries were translating the Bible from French into languages such as northern Slavey. After 1960, Wycliffe Bible translator Richard Mueller introduced a new modified spelling system. The purpose of his writing system was to better distinguish the sounds of the Gwichʼin language. Later on, Mueller's writing system was officially adopted by the Yukon Territory. The new writing system helped expand the uses of the Gwichʼin language since speakers previously found the system for writing Gwichʼin less user friendly.

== Grammar ==
Gwichʼin is a highly polysynthetic, head-marking language with extensive exclusive prefixal inflection. Word order is relatively flexible but generally follows a SOV (Subject-Object-Verb) pattern. The language exhibits evidentiality and verbal inflection that conveys aspectual distinctions rather than tense. Gwichʼin uses postpositions rather than prepositions. Like other Athabaskan languages, Gwichʼin has classifier prefixes in verbs that indicate transitivity and valency changes.

=== Verb configuration ===
A verb in Gwichʼin contains a great number of smaller meaningful units or morphemes that combine to give the verb its intended meaning. A verb is composed of the stem preceded by a varying number of prefixes, which in Gwichʼin contain information about tense, aspect, and the number of people involved in the action.

nintɬʼeltshùh
ni-ntɬʼe-l-tshùh
2S-object-1S-give
I gave it to you

Unlike English verbs, which come with comparatively very little derivation and inflection (i.e. number of affixes), a Gwichʼin verb is so rich in affixes that a single inflected and conjugated verb can correspond to whole sentences in English, as in (1).

== In popular culture ==
In the PBS Kids television show Molly of Denali, the main character Molly comes from a family of Gwichʼin background, and therefore uses words in the Gwichʼin language such as 'Mahsi' Choo' throughout the show. Molly shares her Gwichʼin background with the show's creative producer, Princess Daazhraii Johnson.
