= Autism Act =

Autism Act may refer to

- Autism Act 2009 (c. 15)
- Autism Act (Northern Ireland) 2011 (c. 27 (N.I.))
