= Telecommunications Act =

Telecommunications Act may refer to:

- Telecommunications Act 1997, Australia
- Telecommunications Act (Canada)
- Telecommunications Act, 2023, India
- Telecommunications Act 1950, an act of the Parliament of Malaysia
- Telecommunications Act 2001, a statute of New Zealand amended in 2011
- Telecommunications Act 1984 (c. 12), United Kingdom
- Telecommunications Act of 1996, United States
