= Government of India Act =

The term Government of India Act refers to the series of acts passed by the Parliament of the United Kingdom to regulate the government of Colonial India, in particular:

- Government of India Act 1833 (3 & 4 Will. 4. c. 85) or Saint Helena Act 1833, created the post of Governor-General of India
- Government of India Act 1858 (21 & 22 Vict. c. 106), India came under direct crown rule from the British East India Company
- Government of India Act 1909 (9 Edw. 7. c. 4) or Indian Councils Act 1909, brought about a limited increase in the involvement of Indians in the governance of colonial India
- Government of India Act 1912 (2 & 3 Geo. 5. c. 6), modified the Indian Councils Act 1909 and undid the Division of Bengal (1905)
- Government of India Act 1915 (5 & 6 Geo. 5. c. 61), an aggregation into a single act of most of the existing acts of Parliament concerning Indian government
- Government of India Act 1919 (9 & 10 Geo. 5. c. 101), passed to expand participation of Indians in the government of India
- Government of India Act 1935 (26 Geo. 5 & 1 Edw. 8. c. 2), never fully implemented, served as part of the constitutional basis of India and Pakistan

== See also ==
- Indian Councils Act (disambiguation)
  - Indian Councils Act 1861
  - Indian Councils Act 1892
  - Indian Councils Act 1909
