= House of Lords Act =

House of Lords Act may refer to

- House of Lords Act 1999 (c. 34)
- House of Lords (Expulsion and Suspension) Act 2015 (c. 14)
- House of Lords (Hereditary Peers) Act 2026 (c. 12)

== See also ==
- House of Lords Reform Act 2014
