= Libel Act 1843 =

Act of the Parliament of the United Kingdom

Libel Act 1843 (Note: The citation of this act by this short title was authorised by section 1 of, and the first schedule to, the Short Titles Act 1896. Due to the repeal of those provisions it is now authorised by section 19(2) of the Interpretation Act 1978.)
- Act of Parliament
- Parliament of the United Kingdom
- Long title: An Act to amend the Law respecting defamatory Words and Libel.
- Citation: 6 & 7 Vict. c. 96
- Territorial extent: England and Wales; Ireland; (Note: Section 10.)

Dates
- Royal assent: 24 August 1843
- Commencement: 1 November 1843 (Note: Section 10.)
Other legislation
Amended by	Statute Law Revision Act 1874 (No. 2); Civil Procedure Acts Repeal Act 1879; Statute Law Revision and Civil Procedure Act 1883; Statute Law Revision Act 1891; Statute Law Revision Act 1892; Costs in Criminal Cases Act 1908; Larceny Act 1916; Coroners and Justice Act 2009

Status: Partially repealed

Text of statute as originally enacted

Revised text of statute as amended

Text of the Libel Act 1843 as in force today (including any amendments) within the United Kingdom, from legislation.gov.uk.

The Libel Act 1843 (6 & 7 Vict. c. 96), commonly known as Lord Campbell's Libel Act, is an act of the Parliament of the United Kingdom. It enacted several important codifications of and modifications to the common law tort of libel.

This act was repealed in the Republic of Ireland by section 4 of, and Part 2 of Schedule 1 to, the Defamation Act, 1961.

== Provisions ==
=== Section 3 - Publishing or threatening to publish a libel, or proposing to abstain from publishing any thing, with intent to extort money, punishable by imprisonment and hard labour ===
Section 3 of the act was repealed by the schedule to the Larceny Act 1916.

=== Section 4 - Publication of libel known to be false ===
Section 4 of the act formerly provided:

If any person shall maliciously publish any defamatory libel, knowing the same to be false, every such person, being convicted thereof, shall be liable to be imprisoned in the common gaol or house of correction for any term not exceeding two years, and to pay such fine as the court shall award.

This section was repealed for England and Wales and Northern Ireland by section 178 of, and Part 2 of Schedule 23, to the Coroners and Justice Act 2009.

This section was replaced for the Republic of Ireland by section 12 of the Defamation Act, 1961.

Alternative verdict

See Boaler v R (1888) 21 QBD 284, (1888) 16 Cox 488, (1888) 4 TLR 565

=== Section 5 - Publication of libel ===
Section 5 of the act formerly provided:

If any person shall maliciously publish any defamatory libel, every such person, being convicted thereof, shall be liable to fine or imprisonment or both, as the court may award, such imprisonment not to exceed the term of one year.

This section did not create or define an offence. It provided the penalty for the existing common law offence of defamatory libel.

This section was repealed for England and Wales and Northern Ireland by section 178 of, and Part 2 of Schedule 23, to the Coroners and Justice Act 2009. The repeal of this section was consequential on the abolition of the common law offence of defamatory libel by section 73(b) of that Act.

This section was replaced for the Republic of Ireland by section 11 of the Defamation Act, 1961.

=== Section 6 - Defence of truth and public benefit against defamatory libel ===
Section 6 of the act allowed the defendant to prove the truth of a libel as a valid defence in criminal proceedings, but only if it also be demonstrated that publication of the libel was to the "Public Benefit". Proving the statement's truth had previously been allowed only in civil libel defences inasmuch as the criminal offence against the public at large was considered to be provoking a breach of peace via printing malicious statements rather than the defamation per se; the truth or falsity of the statement had therefore been considered irrelevant in criminal proceedings before the Act.

This section was repealed for England and Wales and Northern Ireland by section 178 of, and Part 2 of Schedule 23, to the Coroners and Justice Act 2009.

This section was replaced for the Republic of Ireland by section 6 of the Defamation Act, 1961.

This section did not apply to seditious libel.

=== Section 7 - Evidence to rebut prima facie case of publication by an agent ===
In England and Wales and Northern Ireland, section 7 of the act now reads:

Whensoever [in Northern Ireland], upon the trial of any indictment or information for the publication of a [blasphemous] libel, under the plea of not guilty, evidence shall have been given which shall establish a presumptive case of publication against the defendant by the act of any other person by his authority, it shall be competent to such defendant to prove that such publication was made without his authority, consent, or knowledge, and that the said publication did not arise from want of due care or caution on his part.

The words in square brackets were inserted by section 177 of, and paragraph 66 of Schedule 21 to, the Coroners and Justice Act 2009.

This section was replaced for the Republic of Ireland by section 7 of the Defamation Act, 1961.

This section, in its original form, applied to a prosecution for blasphemous libel.

=== Section 8 - Reimbursement of defence expenses upon acquittal ===
Section 8 of the act permitted a defendant who had been charged by a private prosecutor to recover the costs of his legal defence if found not guilty.

Oscar Wilde was bankrupted under this provision when he abandoned his libel prosecution against Lord Queensberry and was ordered to reimburse him for the considerable expenses Queensberry had incurred for legal representation and private detectives.

== Subsequent developments ==
The preamble to the act was repealed by section 1 of, and the first schedule to, the Statute Law Revision Act 1891 (54 & 55 Vict. c. 67), which came into force on 5 August 1891.

Section 8 of the act was repealed by section 10 of, and the schedule to the Costs in Criminal Cases Act 1908 (8 Edw. 7. c. 15), which came into force on 1 January 1909.

== See also ==
- Libel Act
- Defamation Act
- Halsbury's Statutes
