= Prevention of Terrorism Act =

Prevention of Terrorism Act may refer to:

- Prevention of Terrorism Acts, passed between 1974 and 1989 to deal with terrorism in Northern Ireland in the United Kingdom
- Prevention of Terrorism Act, 2002, in India
- Prevention of Terrorism Act 2005, in the United Kingdom
- Prevention of Terrorism Act (Sri Lanka), in Sri Lanka, enacted as a temporary law in 1979, then made permanent in 1982
- Prevention of Terrorism Act 2015, in Malaysia
