= Tribal council =

Tribal council or Tribal Council may refer to:

- Tribal council (Canada), an association of First Nations bands in Canada
- Tribal council (Germanic), also known as a thing, a governing assembly in early Germanic society
- Tribal council (United States), a governing body for certain Native American tribes within the United States
- Tribal Council (Survivor), a format point in the reality television franchise Survivor
