= Official Languages Act (Northwest Territories) =

Northwest Territories territorial legislation

Legislative Assembly of the Northwest Territories
- Citation: 1988, c. O-1
- Assented to: 1988
- Status: In force (amended)

The Official Languages Act (French: Loi sur les langues officielles) is a law enacted by the Legislative Assembly of the Northwest Territories, enacted in 1988 which establishes that Northwest Territories has eleven official languages. The Act establishes that the official languages of Northwest Territories are: Inuktitut, Inuinnaqtun, Inuvialuktun, Gwich'in, North Slavey, South Slavey, Tłı̨chǫ, Chipewyan, Cree, English, and French.

== History ==
French was made an official language in 1877 by the then-territorial government of the Northwest Territories. After a lengthy and bitter debate resulting from a speech from the throne in 1888 by Lieutenant Governor Joseph Royal, the members of the time voted on more than one occasion to nullify this and make English the only language used in the assembly. After some conflict with the Confederation Government in Ottawa, and a decisive vote on January 19, 1892, the assembly members voted for an English-only territory.

The Official Languages Act of the Northwest Territories was enacted in 1988.

== Provisions ==
The Act was amended in 2023 to allow the Commissioner to take the Government of the Northwest Territories to the Supreme Court.

== Implementation ==
Access to services in indigenous languages in the Northwest Territories has been described as a "struggle" by the Official Languages Commissioner of the Northwest Territories.

== Criticism and suggested reform ==
The Act has been criticised by parents for not allowing babies to be given traditional names with accents.

There have been repeated calls for Michif to become the territory's twelfth official language.
