= Town and Country Planning Act =

Town and Country Planning Act may refer to:

== New Zealand ==
- Town and Country Planning Act 1977

== United Kingdom ==
- Town and Country Planning Act 1947 (10 & 11 Geo. 6. c. 51)
- Town and Country Planning (Scotland) Act 1947 (10 & 11 Geo. 6. c. 53)
- Town and Country Planning Act 1990 (c. 8)
- Town and Country Planning (Scotland) Act 1997 (c. 8)
