= Land Registration Act =

Land Registration Act may refer to three acts of Parliament in the United Kingdom:

- Land Registration Act 1925 (15 & 16 Geo. 5. c. 21)
- Land Registration Act 1936 (26 Geo. 5 & 1 Edw. 8. c. 26), amending the 1925 act
- Land Registration Act 2002 (c. 9), superseding the 1925 and 1936 acts

== See also ==
- Land Registry Act 1862, an initial attempt at land registration
