= Animal Welfare Act =

The Animal Welfare Act is one of several laws in different countries, including:

- The Animal Welfare Act 1999 in New Zealand
- The Animal Welfare Act of 1998 in the Philippines
- The Animal Welfare Act of 1966 in the US
- The Animal Welfare Act 2006 (c. 45) in the UK
