= Short Titles Act 1896 =

Act of the Parliament of the United Kingdom

Short Titles Act 1896 (Note: Section 5.)
- Act of Parliament
- Parliament of the United Kingdom
- Long title: An Act to facilitate the Citation of sundry Acts of Parliament.
- Citation: 59 & 60 Vict. c. 14
- Introduced by: The Lord Chancellor (Lords)
- Territorial extent: United Kingdom

Dates
- Royal assent: 20 July 1896
- Commencement: 20 July 1896 (Note: The Acts of Parliament (Commencement) Act 1793.)
Other legislation
Repeals/revokes	Short Titles Act 1892
Amended by	Statute Law Revision Act 1908; Interpretation Act 1978; Statute Law (Repeals) Act 1995

Status: Amended

Text of statute as originally enacted

The Short Titles Act 1896 (59 & 60 Vict. c. 14) is an act of the Parliament of the United Kingdom. It replaces the Short Titles Act 1892 (55 & 56 Vict. c. 10).

Section 1 of, and schedule 1 to, the act authorised the citation of 2,095 earlier acts by short titles. The acts given short titles were passed between 1351 and 1893. This act gave short titles to all public general acts passed since the Union of England and Scotland and then in force, which had not already been given short titles, except for those omitted from the Revised Edition of the Statutes by reason of their local or personal character.

== Subsequent developments ==
Section 4 of the act was repealed by section 1 of, and the schedule to, the Statute Law Revision Act 1908 (8 Edw. 7. c. 49), which came into force on 21 December 1908. The 1908 act also repealed the following entries in schedule 1 to the act.

- Linen and Hempen Manufactories (Scotland) Act 1726 (13 Geo. 1. c. 26)
- Fisheries (Scotland) Act 1726 (13 Geo. 1. c. 30)
- Justices Qualification Act 1731 (5 Geo. 2. c. 18)
- Justices Qualification Act 1744 (18 Geo. 2. c. 20)
- Marine Insurance Act 1745 (19 Geo. 2. c. 37)
- Inclosure Act 1756 (29 Geo. 2. c. 36)
- Inclosure Act 1757 (31 Geo. 2. c. 41)
- Inclosure (Consolidation) Act 1801 (41 Geo. 3. (U.K.) c. 109)
- Inclosure Act 1821 (1 & 2 Geo. 4. c. 23)
- Royal Burghs (Scotland) Act 1822 (3 Geo. 4. c. 91)
- Masters and Workmen Arbitration Act 1824 (5 Geo. 4. c. 96)
- Quarantine Act 1825 (6 Geo. 4. c. 78)
- Licensing (Scotland) Act 1828 (9 Geo. 4. c. 58)
- Charities (Ireland) Act 1832 (2 & 3 Will. 4. c. 85)
- Royal Burghs (Scotland) Act 1833 (3 & 4 Will. 4. c. 76)
- Parliamentary Burghs (Scotland) Act 1833 (3 & 4 Will. 4. c. 77)
- Common Fields Exchange Act 1834 (4 & 5 Will. 4. c. 30)
- Registration of Aliens Act 1836 (6 & 7 Will. 4. c. 11)
- Poor Relief (Loans) Act 1836 (6 & 7 Will. 4. c. 107)
- Inclosure Act 1836 (6 & 7 Will. 4. c. 115)
- Land Tax Redemption Act 1837 (7 Will. 4 & 1 Vict. c. 17)
- County Dublin Baronies Act 1838 (1 & 2 Vict. c. 115)
- County Institutions (Ireland) Act 1838 (1 & 2 Vict. c. 116)
- Stannaries Act 1839 (2 & 3 Vict. c. 58)
- Inclosure Act 1840 (3 & 4 Vict. c. 31)
- Manufactories Improvement Fund (Scotland) Act 1847 (10 & 11 Vict. c. 91)
- County Cess (Ireland) Act 1848 (11 & 12 Vict. c. 32)
- Indictable Offences (Ireland) Act 1849 (12 & 13 Vict. c. 69)
- Burghs (Scotland) Act 1852 (15 & 16 Vict. c. 32)
- Berwickshire Courts Act 1853 (16 & 17 Vict. c. 27)
- Licensing (Scotland) Act 1853 (16 & 17 Vict. c. 67)
- Land Tax Redemption Act 1853 (16 & 17 Vict. c. 74)
- Education Department Act 1856 (19 & 20 Vict. c. 116)
- Burgesses (Scotland) Act 1860 (23 & 24 Vict. c. 47)
- Boundaries of Burghs Extension (Scotland) Act 1861 (24 & 25 Vict. c. 36)
- Turnpike Trusts Relief Act 1861 (24 & 25 Vict. c. 46)
- Dogs (Ireland) Act 1862 (25 & 26 Vict. c. 59)
- Dogs (Scotland) Act 1863 (26 & 27 Vict. c. 100)
- Chain Cable and Anchor Act 1864 (27 & 28 Vict. c. 27)
- Poor Law Officers Superannuation Act 1864 (27 & 28 Vict. c. 42)
- Lancaster Palatine Court Act 1865 (28 & 29 Vict. c. 40)
- Dogs Act 1865 (28 & 29 Vict. c. 60)
- Public Works (Ireland) Act 1867 (30 & 31 Vict. c. 112)
- Justices Qualification Act 1871 (34 & 35 Vict. c. 18)
- Colonial Attorneys Relief Act 1874 (37 & 38 Vict. c. 41)
- Mersey Collisions Act 1874 (37 & 38 Vict. c. 52)
- Justices Qualification Act 1875 (38 & 39 Vict. c. 54)
- Burgesses Qualification (Scotland) Act 1876 (39 & 40 Vict. c. 12)
- Burgh Wards (Scotland) Act 1876 (39 & 40 Vict. c. 25)
- Pauper Children (Ireland) Act 1876 (39 & 40 Vict. c. 38)
- Borough Quarter Sessions Act 1877 (40 & 41 Vict. c. 17)
- Lunatic Asylum Loans (Ireland) Act 1878 (41 & 42 Vict. c. 24)
- Public Works Loans Act 1880 (43 & 44 Vict. c. 1)

The 1908 act also repealed the following entries in schedule 2 to the act.

- The Factory and Workshop Acts 1878 to 1895
- The Friendly Societies Acts 1875 to 1895
- The Justices Qualification Acts 1731 to 1875
- The Licensing (Scotland) Acts 1828 to 1887
- The Open Spaces Acts 1877 to 1890

Section 3 of the act was repealed by section 25(1) of, and schedule 3 to, the Interpretation Act 1978, which came into force on 1 January 1979.

In column 3 of schedule 1 to the act, against the act Clerk of Parliaments Act 1824 (5 Geo. 4. c. 82), the words "The Clerk of the Parliaments Act 1824" were substituted for the words "The Clerk of Parliaments Act 1824" by section 2 of, and paragraph 2(1) of schedule 3 to, the Statute Law (Repeals) Act 1978, which came into force on 31 July 1978. Paragraph 2(2) of schedule 3 to the 1978 act provided that a corresponding change was to be made in any existing citation of the 1824 act, but without prejudice to the validity of any citation not so amended.

In 1995, the Law Commission and the Scottish Law Commission recommended that section 1 and schedule 1 be repealed and recommended the repeal of a further 74 collective titles.

Section 1 of, and the schedule to, the act were repealed by section 1(1) of, and group X of part X of schedule 1 to, the Statute Law (Repeals) Act 1995, which came into force on 8 November 1995. Notwithstanding these repeals, such citations are still authorized by section 19(2) of the Interpretation Act 1978. The 1995 act also repealed the following entries in schedule 2 to the act.

- The Bank Notes Acts 1826 to 1852
- The Bankruptcy Acts 1883 to 1890
- The Bankruptcy (Scotland) Acts 1856 to 1881
- The Baths and Washhouses Acts 1846 to 1882
- The Births, Deaths, and Marriages (Scotland) Acts 1854 to 1860
- The Births and Deaths Registration (Ireland) Acts 1863 to 1880
- The Bridges Acts 1740 to 1815
- The Bridges (Ireland) Acts 1813 to 1875
- The British Subjects Acts 1708 to 1772
- The Building Societies Acts 1874 to 1894
- The Burial Grounds (Scotland) Acts 1855 to 1886
- The Charitable Trusts Acts 1853 to 1894
- The Companies Acts 1862 to 1893
- The Congested Districts Board (Ireland) Acts
- The Copyright Acts 1734 to 1888
- The Coroners (Ireland) Acts 1829 to 1881
- The County Courts (Ireland) Acts 1851 to 1889
- The County Infirmaries (Ireland) Acts 1805 to 1833
- The Drainage and Improvement of Lands (Ireland) Acts 1863 to 1892
- The Drainage and Navigation (Ireland) Acts 1842 to 1857
- The Durham County Palatine Acts 1836 to 1889
- The East India Company (Money) Acts 1786 to 1858
- The East India Loans Acts 1859 to 1893
- The Education (Scotland) Acts 1872 to 1893
- The Elementary Education Acts 1870 to 1893
- The Endowed Schools Acts 1869 to 1889
- The Fisheries (Ireland) Acts 1842 to 1895
- The Government Annuities Acts 1829 to 1888
- The Herring Fisheries (Scotland) Acts 1821 to 1890
- The Highway Acts 1835 to 1885
- The International Copyright Acts
- The Judicature (Ireland) Acts 1877 to 1888
- The Juries Acts 1825 to 1870
- The Justiciary Court (Scotland) Acts 1783 to 1892
- The Labourers (Ireland) Acts 1883 to 1892
- The Lancaster County Palatine Acts 1794 to 1871
- The Licensing (Ireland) Acts 1833 to 1886
- The Life Assurance Companies Acts 1870 to 1872
- The Lunacy (Scotland) Acts 1857 to 1887
- The Lunacy (Ireland) Acts 1821 to 1890
- The Matrimonial Causes Acts 1857 to 1878
- The Medical Acts
- The Merchandise Marks Acts 1887 to 1894
- The Metropolis Management Acts 1855 to 1893
- The Municipal Corporations (Ireland) Acts 1840 to 1888
- The Naval Enlistment Acts 1835 to 1884
- The Patents, Designs, and Trade Marks Acts 1883 to 1888
- The Petroleum Acts 1871 to 1881
- The Police Acts 1839 to 1893
- The Police (Scotland) Acts 1857 to 1890
- The Post Office Acts 1837 to 1895
- The Post Office (Duties) Acts 1840 to 1891
- The Post Office (Management) Acts 1837 to 1884
- The Post Office (Money Orders) Acts 1848 to 1883
- The Post Office (Offences) Acts 1837 and 1884
- The Post Office Savings Bank Acts 1861 to 1893
- The Prison Acts 1865 to 1893
- The Prisons (Scotland) Acts 1860 to 1887
- The Prisons (Ireland) Acts 1826 to 1884
- The Public Libraries Acts 1892 and 1893
- The Public Libraries (Ireland) Acts 1855 to 1894
- The Public Libraries (Scotland) Acts 1887 and 1894
- The Public Money Drainage Acts 1846 to 1856
- The Salmon Fisheries (Scotland) Acts 1828 to 1868
- The Salmon and Freshwater Fisheries Acts 1861 to 1892
- The Small Debt (Scotland) Acts 1837 to 1889
- The Solicitors Acts 1839 to 1894
- The Solicitors (Ireland) Acts 1849 to 1881
- The Superannuation Acts 1834 to 1892
- The Trustee Savings Banks Acts 1863 to 1893
- The Trusts (Scotland) Acts 1861 to 1891
- The Universities and College Estates Acts 1858 to 1880
- The Weights and Measures Acts 1878 to 1893
- The Yeomanry Acts 1802 to 1826

The act was retained for the Republic of Ireland by section 2(2)(a) of, and part 4 of schedule 1 to, the Statute Law Revision Act 2007, which came into force on 8 May 2007. The 2007 act amended schedule 1 to the act. In that country, this act is one of the Short Titles Acts 1896 to 2007.

== Provisions ==
Section 4 of the act repealed the Short Titles Act 1892 (55 & 56 Vict. c. 10).

Section 2(1) of, and schedule 2 to, the act originally authorised the citation of 132 groups of acts by collective titles.

The entries relating to the following groups of acts were not repealed by either the Statute Law Revision Act 1908 (55 & 56 Vict. c. 10) or the Statute Law (Repeals) Act 1995 (c. 44):

- The Bank of England Acts 1694 to 1892
- The Bank of Ireland Acts 1808 to 1892
- The Bank Notes (Scotland) Acts 1765 to 1854
- The Bank Notes (Ireland) Acts 1825 to 1864
- The Births and Deaths Registration Acts 1836 to 1874
- The Burial Acts 1852 to 1885
- The Burial (Ireland) Acts 1824 to 1868
- The Church Building Acts 1818 to 1884
- The Cinque Ports Acts 1811 to 1872
- The Companies Clauses Acts 1845 to 1889
- The Constabulary (Ireland) Acts 1836 to 1885
- The Conveyancing Acts 1881 to 1892
- The Court of Session Acts 1808 to 1895
- The Crown Lands Acts 1829 to 1894
- The Defence Acts 1842 to 1873
- The Ecclesiastical Commissioners Acts 1840 to 1885
- The Ecclesiastical Courts Acts 1787 to 1860
- The Entail Acts
- The Evidence Acts 1806 to 1895
- The Grand Juries (Ireland) Acts 1816 to 1895
- The Greenwich Hospital Acts 1865 to 1892
- The House of Commons (Disqualifications) Acts 1715 to 1821
- The Inclosure Acts 1845 to 1882
- The Judicature Acts 1873 to 1894
- The Juries (Scotland) Acts 1745 to 1869
- The Juries (Ireland) Acts 1871 to 1894
- The Land Law (Ireland) Acts
- The Land Purchase (Ireland) Acts
- The Landed Property Improvement (Ireland) Acts
- The Licensing Acts 1828 to 1886
- The Marriage Acts 1811 to 1886
- The Metropolitan Commons Acts 1866 to 1878
- The Metropolitan Police Acts 1829 to 1895
- The National Debt Acts 1870 to 1893
- The New Parishes Acts 1843 to 1884
- The Parliamentary Costs Acts 1847 to 1879
- The Penal Servitude Acts 1853 to 1891
- The Poor Relief (Ireland) Acts 1838 to 1892
- The Public Health Acts
- The Public Schools Acts 1868 to 1873
- The Public Works (Ireland) Acts 1831 to 1886
- The Queen Anne's Bounty Acts 1706 to 1870
- The Railway and Canal Traffic Acts 1854 to 1894
- The Railway Regulation Acts 1840 to 1893
- The School Sites Acts
- The Sea Fisheries Acts 1843 to 1893
- The Settled Land Acts 1882 to 1890
- The Telegraph Acts 1863 to 1892
- The Tithe Acts 1836 to 1891
- The Town Police Clauses Acts 1847 and 1889
- The Tramways (Ireland) Acts 1860 to 1895
- The Trustee Appointment Acts 1850 to 1890
- The Vestries Acts 1818 to 1853

== See also ==
- Short Titles Act

== Bibliography ==
- HL Deb vol 34, col 198, vol 37, cols 217 and 1364, vol 38, col 1329, vol 40, cols 722, 862, 991 and 1414, vol 42, col 1193, HC Deb vol 40, col 720, vol 41, cols 781, 1416, 1651 and 1754, vol 42, cols 129, 628, 736, 899, 1003, 1046 and 1192.
