= Acts of Parliament Numbering and Citation Act 1962 =

Act of the Parliament of the United Kingdom

Acts of Parliament Numbering and Citation Act 1962 (Note: The citation of this act by this short title is authorised by section 2 of the act. The comma preceding the calendar year in printed copies of the act is omitted on the authority of a note by Sir Noel Hutton QC, First Parliamentary Counsel, as to which see "The Citation of Statutes" 82 LQR 24-24. The validity of this note is questioned by Halsbury's Laws of England, Fourth Edition, Reissue, Volume 44(1), footnote 10 to paragraph 1268.)
- Act of Parliament
- Parliament of the United Kingdom
- Long title: An Act to provide for the numbering and citation of future Acts of Parliament by reference to the calendar year in which they are passed.
- Citation: 10 & 11 Eliz. 2. c. 34
- Introduced by: John Hobson MP, Solicitor-General (Commons); Viscount Kilmuir, Lord Chancellor (Lords)
- Territorial extent: United Kingdom

Dates
- Royal assent: 19 July 1962
- Commencement: 1 January 1963 (Note: Section 1.)

Status: Current legislation

Text of statute as originally enacted

Revised text of statute as amended

Text of the Acts of Parliament Numbering and Citation Act 1962 as in force today (including any amendments) within the United Kingdom, from legislation.gov.uk.

The Acts of Parliament Numbering and Citation Act 1962 (10 & 11 Eliz. 2. c. 34) is an act of the Parliament of the United Kingdom. It has never been amended. It was introduced because the existing system of citing acts by session and chapter was considered inconvenient.

== Provisions ==
Section 1 of the act provides that the chapter number of every act of Parliament passed on or after 1 January 1963 is assigned by reference to the calendar year in which it has been passed, instead of by reference to the session of parliament in which it has been passed. Section 1 of the act further provides that any such act may be cited accordingly in any act, instrument or document.

Section 2 of the act authorises the citation of this act by a short title.

== Other developments ==
The researcher, Graham McBain, has suggested combining the act with other legislation concerning parliamentary procedure, such as the Parliamentary Costs Act 2006, into a new Parliament Act.

== See also ==
- Citation of United Kingdom legislation
