= Criminal Lunatics (Ireland) Act 1838 =

Act of the Parliament of the United Kingdom

Criminal Lunatics (Ireland) Act 1838 (Note: The citation of this act by this short title was authorised by section 1 of, and the first schedule to, the Short Titles Act 1896. Due to the repeal of those provisions it is now authorised by section 19(2) of the Interpretation Act 1978.)
- Act of Parliament
- Parliament of the United Kingdom
- Long title: An Act to make more effectual Provision for the Prevention of Offences by Insane Persons in Ireland.
- Citation: 1 & 2 Vict. c. 27
- Territorial extent: Ireland (Note: Section 3.)

Dates
- Royal assent: 11 June 1838
- Commencement: 11 June 1838 (Note: The Acts of Parliament (Commencement) Act 1793.)
- Repealed: 2 April 1962 (Note: The Mental Health Act 1961 (Commencement No. 2) Order (Northern Ireland) 1962 (SI 1962/54).)
Other legislation
Repealed by	Statute Law Revision Act 1874 (No. 2); Statute Law Revision (No. 2) Act 1890; Statute Law Revision Act 1891; Prison Act (Northern Ireland) 1953; Mental Health Act (Northern Ireland) 1961

Status: Repealed

Text of statute as originally enacted

The Criminal Lunatics (Ireland) Act 1838 (1 & 2 Vict. c. 27) was an act of the Parliament of the United Kingdom, signed into law on 11 June 1838. It was one of the Lunacy (Ireland) Acts 1821 to 1890. (Note: The Short Titles Act 1896, section 2(1) and schedule 2.)

== Provisions ==
The act provided that when a person was detained under circumstances suggesting that they were of deranged mind and had the intention of committing a crime, then two justices were empowered to call in a physician to examine the suspect. If the physician determined that the person was a "dangerous lunatic" he could be committed to jail, until either discharged by order of two justices or removed to a lunatic asylum by order of the Lord Lieutenant.

== Role of Lord Lieutenant ==
The Lord Lieutenant was given the power to direct persons under a sentence of imprisonment or transportation be placed in a lunatic asylum, to remain there until certified of sound mind by two physicians, when the Lord Lieutenant could direct their removal. Additionally, he was given a similar power in regard to persons committed for trial.

== See also ==
- Criminal Lunatics Act 1800
