= List of registration districts in England =

Registration districts were created in England and Wales with the introduction of civil registration by the Births and Deaths Registration Act 1836. Each district is headed by a superintendent registrar who holds overall responsibility for the administration of civil registration within their district. Historically, each district was divided into sub-districts, which were each headed by a registrar.

The boundaries of registration districts were originally coterminous with poor law unions; however, the number of districts and their boundaries varied considerably over time, with smaller districts being merged and larger districts split in line with population changes. Registration districts were not always coterminous with county boundaries, even following the creation of administrative counties and districts by the Local Government Act 1888, and so were grouped into registration counties for census purposes until the 1930s, when their boundaries were fully aligned with local counties and county boroughs.

In England and Wales, the responsibility for civil registration is today held by the relevant county council, unitary authority, metropolitan district, or London borough. Local government areas often contained several registration districts operating under the supervision of the local authority; however, a series of mergers in the late 2000s and early 2010s means that the boundaries of registration districts are now identical to those of local authorities.

== Current ==
This list is complete and up to date as of April 2020.

Registration district	Created	Local authority responsible
Barking and Dagenham	1980	London Borough of Barking and Dagenham
Barnet	1965	London Borough of Barnet
Barnsley	1974	Barnsley Metropolitan Borough Council
Bath and North East Somerset	1996	Bath and North East Somerset Council
Bedford	2009	Bedford Borough Council
Bexley	1965	London Borough of Bexley
Birmingham	1974	Birmingham City Council
Blackburn with Darwen	1998	Blackburn with Darwen Borough Council
Blackpool	1998	Blackpool Borough Council
Bolton	1974	Bolton Metropolitan Borough Council
Bournemouth, Christchurch and Poole	2019	Bournemouth, Christchurch and Poole Council
Bracknell Forest	1998	Bracknell Forest Borough Council
Bradford and Keighley	2008	Bradford City Council
Brent	1965	London Borough of Brent
Brighton and Hove	1998	Brighton and Hove City Council
Bristol	1996	Bristol City Council
Bromley	1965	London Borough of Bromley
Buckinghamshire	2007	Buckinghamshire County Council
Bury	1974	Metropolitan Borough of Bury
Calderdale	2003	Calderdale Metropolitan Borough Council
Cambridgeshire	2007	Cambridgeshire County Council
Camden	1977	London Borough of Camden
Central Bedfordshire	2009	Central Bedfordshire Council
Cheshire East	2009	Cheshire East Borough Council
Cheshire West and Chester	2009	Cheshire West and Chester Borough Council
Cornwall	2007	Cornwall Council
County of Durham	2006	County Durham Council
Coventry	1974	Coventry City Council
Croydon	1965	London Borough of Croydon
Cumbria	2011	Cumbria County Council
Darlington	1974	Darlington Borough Council
Derby	1837	Derby City Council
Derbyshire	2013	Derbyshire County Council
Devon	2007	Devon County Council
Doncaster	1974	Doncaster Metropolitan Borough Council
Dorset	2005	Dorest Council
Dudley	1974	Dudley Metropolitan Borough Council
Ealing	1965	London Borough of Ealing
East Riding of Yorkshire	2002	East Riding of Yorkshire Council
East Sussex	2008	East Sussex County Council
Enfield	1965	London Borough of Enfield
Essex	2010	Essex County Council
Gateshead	1974	Gateshead Metropolitan Borough Council
Gloucestershire	2006	Gloucestershire County Council
Greenwich	1965	Royal Borough of Greenwich
Hackney	1965	London Borough of Hackney
Halton	1974	Halton Borough Council
Hammersmith and Fulham	2001	London Borough of Hammersmith and Fulham
Hampshire	2008	Hampshire County Council
Haringey	1965	London Borough of Haringey
Harrow	1965	London Borough of Harrow
Hartlepool	1996	Hartlepool Borough Council
Havering	1965	London Borough of Havering
Herefordshire	2008	Herefordshire Council
Hertfordshire	2008	Hertfordshire County Council
Hillingdon	1965	London Borough of Hillingdon
Hounslow	1965	London Borough of Hounslow
Hull	1837	Hull City Council
Isle of Wight	1932	Isle of Wight Council
Isles of Scilly	1837	Council of the Isles of Scilly
Islington	1965	London Borough of Islington
Kensington and Chelsea	1981	London Borough of Kensington and Chelsea
Kent	2003	Kent County Council
Kingston upon Thames	1965	London Borough of Kingston upon Thames
Kirklees	2012	Kirklees Metropolitan Borough Council
Knowsley	1974	Knowsley Metropolitan Borough Council
Lambeth	1965	London Borough of Lambeth
Lancashire	2005	Lancashire County Council
Leeds	1974	Leeds City Council
Leicester	1997	Leicester City Council
Leicestershire	2000	Leicestershire County Council
Lewisham	1965	London Borough of Lewisham
Lincolnshire	2003	Lincolnshire County Council
Liverpool	1974	Liverpool City Council
London City	1965	City of London Corporation
Luton	1837	Luton Borough Council
Manchester	1974	Manchester City Council
Medway	1998	Medway Council
Merton	1965	London Borough of Merton
Middlesbrough	1996	Middlesbrough Council
Milton Keynes	1985	Milton Keynes Borough Council
Newcastle upon Tyne	1974	Newcastle upon Tyne City Council
Newham	1965	London Borough of Newham
Norfolk	2012	Norfolk County Council
North East Lincolnshire	1996	North East Lincolnshire Council
North Lincolnshire	1996	North Lincolnshire Council
North Somerset	1996	North Somerset Council
North Tyneside	1985	North Tyneside Metropolitan Borough Council
North Yorkshire	1998	North Yorkshire County Council
Northamptonshire	2010	Northamptonshire County Council
Northumberland	2008	Northumberland County Council
Nottingham	1837	Nottingham City Council
Nottinghamshire	2012	Nottinghamshire County Council
Oldham	1974	Oldham Metropolitan Borough Council
Oxfordshire	2001	Oxfordshire County Council
Peterborough	1974	Peterborough City Council
Plymouth	1837	Plymouth City Council
Portsmouth	1900	Portsmouth City Council
Reading	1998	Reading Borough Council
Redbridge	1965	London Borough of Redbridge
Redcar and Cleveland	1996	Redcar and Cleveland Borough Council
Richmond Upon Thames	1965	London Borough of Richmond upon Thames
Rochdale	1974	Rochdale Metropolitan Borough Council
Rotherham	1974	Rotherham Metropolitan Borough Council
Rutland	1997	Rutland County Council
Salford	1974	Salford City Council
Sandwell	1974	Sandwell Metropolitan Borough Council
Sefton	2011	Sefton Metropolitan Borough Council
Sheffield	1974	Sheffield City Council
Shropshire	2005	Shropshire Council
Slough	1974	Slough Borough Council
Solihull	2001	Solihull Metropolitan Borough Council
Somerset	2008	Somerset County Council
South Gloucestershire	1996	South Gloucestershire Council
South Tyneside	2001	South Tyneside Council
Southampton	1837	Southampton City Council
Southend-on-Sea	1939	Southend-on-Sea Council
Southwark	1965	London Borough of Southwark
St Helens	1974	St Helens Metropolitan Borough Council
Staffordshire	2008	Staffordshire County Council
Stockport	1974	Stockport Metropolitan Borough Council
Stockton-on-Tees	1996	Stockton-on-Tees Borough Council
Stoke-on-Trent	1935	Stoke-on-Trent City Council
Suffolk	2010	Suffolk County Council
Sunderland	1974	Sunderland City Council
Surrey	2000	Surrey County Council
Sutton	1965	London Borough of Sutton
Swindon	1899	Swindon Borough Council
Tameside	1974	Tameside Metropolitan Borough Council
Telford and Wrekin	1998	Telford and Wrekin Borough Council
Thurrock	1939	Thurrock Borough Council
Torbay	1968	Torbay Borough Council
Tower Hamlets	1983	London Borough of Tower Hamlets
Trafford	1974	Trafford Metropolitan Borough Council
Wakefield	1974	Wakefield Metropolitan District Council
Walsall	1974	Walsall Metropolitan Borough Council
Waltham Forest	1965	London Borough of Waltham Forest
Wandsworth	1965	London Borough of Wandsworth
Warrington	1974	Warrington Borough Council
Warwickshire	2008	Warwickshire County Council
West Berkshire	1998	West Berkshire Council
West Sussex	2010	West Sussex County Council
Westminster	1965	City of Westminster
Wigan and Leigh	1995	Wigan Metropolitan Borough Council
Wiltshire	2008	Wiltshire Council
Windsor and Maidenhead	1974	Windsor and Maidenhead Borough Council
Wirral	1998	Wirral Metropolitan Borough Council
Wokingham	1998	Wokingham Borough Council
Wolverhampton	1974	Wolverhampton Metropolitan Borough Council
Worcestershire	2006	Worcestershire County Council
York	1974	City of York Council

== Former ==
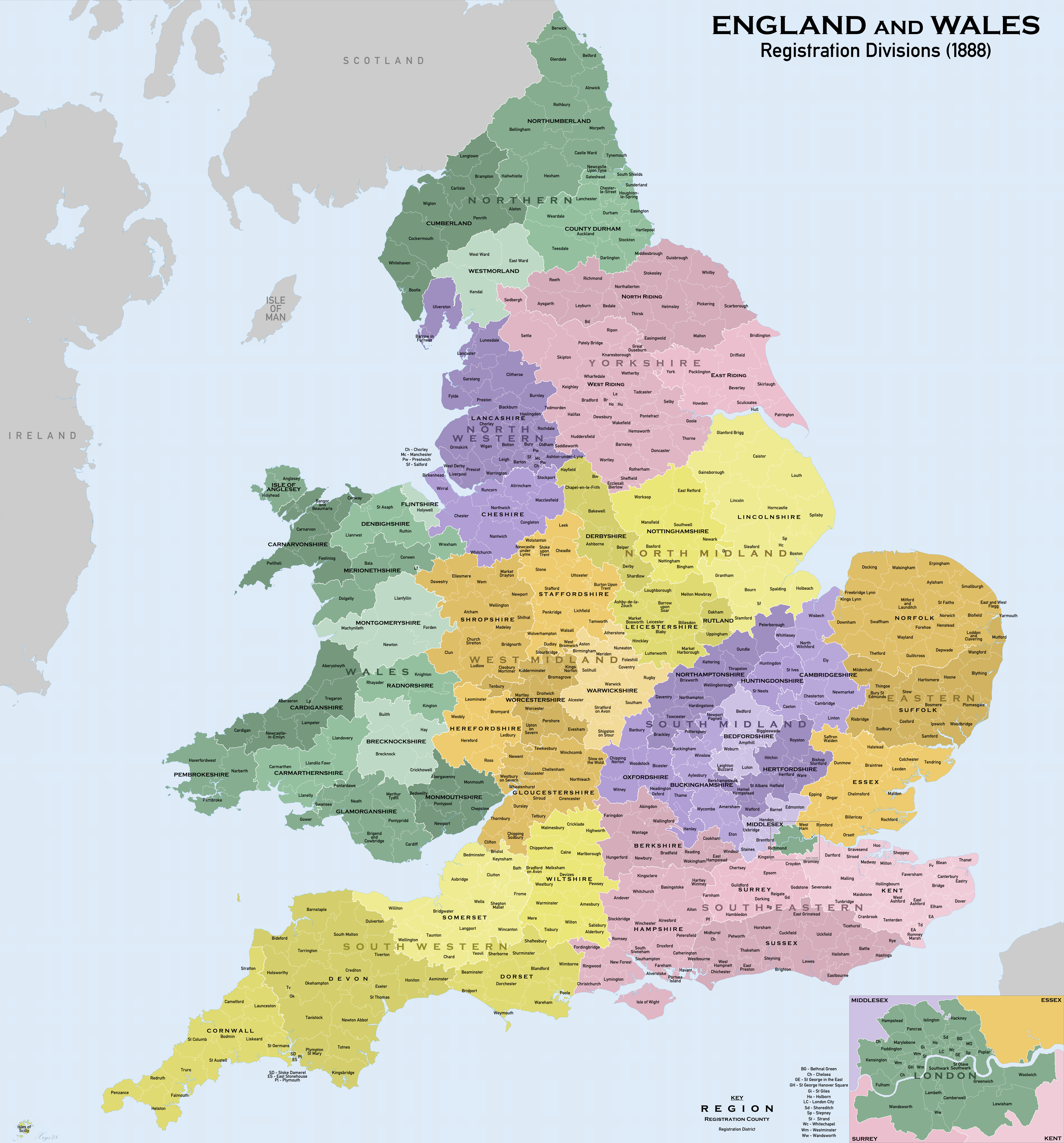
Map showing registration districts of England and Wales in 1888

Registration district	Registration county	Created	Abolished	Notes
Abingdon	Oxfordshire/Berkshire	1837	2001	
Acle	Norfolk	1939	1974	
Alcester	Warwickshire	1837	1985	
Alderbury	Wiltshire	1837	1895	
Aldershot	Hampshire	1932	1974	
Aldridge & Brownhills	Staffordshire	1966	1974	
Alnwick	Northumberland	1837	1936	
Alresford	Hampshire	1837	1932	
Alston	Cumberland	1837	1974	
Alton	Hampshire	1837	2008	
Altrincham	Cheshire	1837	1898	
Alverstoke	Hampshire	1837	1932	
Amber Valley	Derbyshire	1994	2013	
Amersham	Buckinghamshire	1837	1974	
Amesbury	Wiltshire	1837	1936	
Amounderness	Lancashire	1935	1974	
Ampthill	Bedfordshire	1837	1999	
Andover	Hampshire	1837	2008	
Appleby	Cumbria	1974	1984	
Ashbourne	Derbyshire	1837	2013	
Ashby de la Zouch	Leicestershire	1837	1949	
Ashford	Kent	1941	1998	
Ashford with Shepway	Kent	1998	2003	
Ashton	Lancashire	1937	1974	
Ashton & Oldham	Lancashire	1837	1848	
Ashton under Lyne	Lancashire	1848	1937	
Askrigg	Yorkshire North Riding	1837	1869	
Aston	Warwickshire	1837	1924	
Atcham	Shropshire	1837	1935	
Atherstone	Warwickshire	1837	1974	
Auckland	Durham	1837	1938	
Axbridge	Somerset	1837	1936	
Axminster	Devon	1837	1936	
Aylesbury	Buckinghamshire	1837	1985	
Aylesbury Vale	Buckinghamshire	1985	2007	
Aylsham	Norfolk	1837	1938	
Aysgarth	Yorkshire North Riding	1869	1936	
Bakewell	Derbyshire	1839	2013	
Banbury	Oxfordshire	1837	2001	
Barking	Greater London	1965	1980	
Barkston Ash	Yorkshire West Riding	1947	1974	
Barnstaple	Devon	1837	1998	
Barrow in Furness	Cumbria/Lancashire	1876	2011	
Barrow upon Soar	Leicestershire	1837	1949	
Barton	Greater Manchester/Lancashire	1934	1980	
Barton Regis	Gloucestershire	1877	1905	
Barton upon Irwell	Lancashire	1850	1934	
Barton, Worsley & Flixton	Lancashire	1838	1841	
Basford	Nottinghamshire	1837	2012	
Basingstoke	Hampshire	1837	2001	
Bassetlaw	Nottinghamshire	2005	2012	
Bath	Avon/Somerset	1974	1996	
Bathavon	Somerset	1936	1974	
Battersea	London	1930	1965	
Battle	East Sussex/Sussex	1837	1977	
Beaminster	Dorset	1837	1937	
Bedale	Yorkshire North Riding	1839	1936	
Bedford	Bedfordshire	1837	1999	
Bedfordshire	Bedfordshire	1999	2009	
Bedminster	Gloucestershire	1837	1899	
Belford	Northumberland	1837	1937	
Bellingham	Northumberland	1837	1937	
Belper	Derbyshire	1837	1994	
Berkhampstead	Hertfordshire	1837	1939	
Berkhamsted	Hertfordshire	1939	1974	
Bermondsey	London	1837	1965	Abolished in 1870. Recreated in 1934.
Berwick	Northumberland	1837	1936	
Bethnal Green	London/Middlesex	1837	1966	
Beverley	East Riding of Yorkshire/Humberside	1837	2002	Abolished in 1937. Recreated in 1974.
Bicester	Oxfordshire	1837	1932	
Bideford	Devon	1837	1998	
Biggleswade	Bedfordshire	1837	1999	
Billesdon	Leicestershire	1837	1949	
Bilston	Staffordshire	1935	1966	
Bingham	Nottinghamshire	1837	1974	
Birkenhead	Merseyside/Cheshire	1861	1998	
Birmingham North	Warwickshire	1924	1932	
Birmingham South	Warwickshire	1924	1932	
Bishopsgate	London	1837	1838	
Blaby	Leicestershire	1837	1949	
Blackburn	Lancashire	1837	1998	
Blackpool & Fylde	Lancashire	1974	1998	
Blandford	Dorset	1837	1956	
Blean	Kent	1837	1941	
Blofield	Norfolk	1837	1938	
Bloomsbury	London	1837	1838	
Blyth	Suffolk	1935	1983	
Blything	Suffolk	1837	1935	
Bodmin	Cornwall	1837	2007	
Bootle	Cumberland	1837	1939	
Bootle	Merseyside/Lancashire	1934	1980	
Border	Cumberland	1937	1974	
Bosmere	Suffolk	1837	1935	
Boston	Lincolnshire	1837	2003	
Bourne	Lincolnshire	1837	2003	Abolished in 1934. Recreated in 1974.
Bourne & South Kesteven	Lincolnshire	1934	1974	
Bournemouth	Dorset/Hampshire	1932	2019	
Bournemouth & Christchurch	Hampshire	1925	1932	
Brackley	Northamptonshire	1837	2001	
Bracknell	Berkshire	1974	1998	
Bradfield	Berkshire	1837	1937	
Bradford	Yorkshire West Riding/West Yorkshire	1837	2008	
Bradford on Avon	Wiltshire	1837	1936	
Bramham	Yorkshire West Riding	1862	1869	
Bramley	Yorkshire West Riding	1863	1925	
Bramley & Holbeck	Yorkshire West Riding	1925	1929	
Brampton	Cumberland	1837	1937	
Brentford	Middlesex	1837	1947	
Bridge	Kent	1837	1974	
Bridgnorth	Shropshire	1837	2005	
Bridgwater	Somerset	1837	1974	
Bridlington	East Riding of Yorkshire/Humberside	1837	2002	Abolished in 1937. Recreated in 1974.
Bridport	Dorset	1837	1997	
Brighton	East Sussex/Sussex	1837	1998	
Brixworth	Northamptonshire	1837	1974	
Bromsgrove	Worcestershire/Hereford & Worcester	1837	2006	
Bromyard	Herefordshire/Hereford & Worcester	1837	2008	
Buckingham	Buckinghamshire	1837	1935	
Bucklow	Cheshire	1898	1974	
Buckrose	Yorkshire East Riding	1937	1974	
Bullingdon	Oxfordshire	1964	2001	
Bulmer	Yorkshire North Riding	1936	1974	
Burnley	Lancashire	1837	1974	
Burnley & Pendle	Lancashire	1974	2005	
Burton upon Trent	Staffordshire	1837	1974	
Bury St. Edmunds	Suffolk	1837	2010	
Caistor	Lincolnshire	1837	2003	
Calder	Yorkshire West Riding	1938	1974	
Calne	Wiltshire	1837	1936	
Camberwell	Surrey/Greater London	1837	1991	
Camborne Redruth	Cornwall	1974	2007	
Cambridge	Cambridgeshire	1837	2007	Abolished in 1935. Recreated in 1974.
Camelford	Cornwall	1837	1995	
Cannock	Staffordshire	1877	1974	
Cannock Chase	Staffordshire	1974	2008	
Canterbury	Kent	1837	1998	
Canterbury with Swale	Kent	1998	2003	
Carlisle	Cumberland/Cumbria	1837	2011	
Castle Ward	Northumberland	1837	1936	
Castleford	Yorkshire West Riding	1862	1868	
Catherington	Hampshire	1837	1932	
Caxton	Cambridgeshire	1837	1935	
Central Cleveland	Cleveland	1974	1996	
Central Durham	Durham	2004	2006	
Cerne	Dorset	1837	1838	
Chailey	Sussex	1837	1838	
Chanctonbury	Sussex	1935	1974	
Chapel en le Frith	Derbyshire	1838	1974	
Chard	Somerset	1837	1974	
Chatham	Kent	1941	1998	
Cheadle	Staffordshire	1837	1974	
Chelsea	Middlesex/Greater London	1841	1981	
Cheltenham	Gloucestershire	1837	2006	
Chertsey	Surrey	1837	1934	
Cheshire	Cheshire	2007	2009	
Cheshire Central	Cheshire	1998	2007	
Cheshire West	Cheshire	1998	2007	
Chester	Cheshire	1870	1974	
Chester & Ellesmere Port	Cheshire	1974	1998	
Chester le Street	Durham	1837	1938	
Chesterfield	Derbyshire	1837	2013	
Chesterton	Cambridgeshire	1837	1935	
Chichester	Sussex	1837	1974	
Chiltern & Beaconsfield	Buckinghamshire	1974	1988	
Chiltern & South Bucks	Buckinghamshire	1988	1998	
Chiltern Hills	Buckinghamshire	1998	2007	
Chippenham	Wiltshire	1938	2008	
Chipping Norton	Oxfordshire	1837	1982	
Chipping Sodbury	Gloucestershire	1837	1937	
Chorley	Lancashire	1837	2005	
Chorlton	Lancashire	1837	1925	
Christchurch	Hampshire	1837	1974	Abolished in 1925. Recreated in 1974.
Church Stretton	Shropshire	1837	1935	
Cirencester	Gloucestershire	1837	2006	
Claro	North Yorkshire/Yorkshire West Riding	1947	1998	
Cleethorpes	Lincolnshire	1938	1974	
Cleobury Mortimer	Shropshire	1837	1935	
Clerkenwell	London	1837	1869	
Cleveland	Yorkshire North Riding	1936	1974	
Clifton	Gloucestershire	1837	1877	
Clitheroe	Lancashire	1837	1974	
Clun	Shropshire	1837	2005	
Clutton	Somerset	1837	1936	
Coalville	Leicestershire	1949	2000	
Cockermouth	Cumbria/Cumberland	1837	2011	
Congleton	Cheshire	1837	1937	
Congleton & Crewe	Cheshire	1974	1991	
Cookham	Berkshire	1837	1896	
Corby	Northamptonshire	1974	2010	
Cosford	Suffolk	1837	1938	
Cranbrook	Kent	1837	1941	
Crawley	West Sussex	1974	2010	
Crediton	Devon	1837	1936	
Crewe	Cheshire	1937	1974	
Cricklade	Wiltshire	1837	1936	
Crosby	Merseyside/Lancashire	1974	1980	
Crowborough	East Sussex	2000	2008	
Cuckfield	West Sussex/Sussex	1837	1980	
Dartford	Kent	1837	1980	
Darwen	Lancashire	1937	1974	
Daventry	Northamptonshire	1837	2010	
Deben	Suffolk	1935	2010	
Deptford	Greater London	1930	1966	
Depwade	Norfolk	1837	2012	
Derby	Derbyshire	1837	2013	
Devizes	Wiltshire	1837	1998	
Devizes & Marlborough	Wiltshire	1998	2008	
Devon Central	Devon	1936	1974	
Devonport	Devon	1898	1937	
Dewsbury	West Yorkshire	1837	?	
Docking	Norfolk	1837	1938	
Don Valley	Yorkshire West Riding	1938	1974	
Dorchester	Dorset	1837	1949	
Dore	Herefordshire	1837	1838	
Dorking	Surrey	1837	1934	
Dover	Kent	1837	1998	
Downham	Norfolk	1837	2012	
Driffield	Yorkshire East Riding	1837	1937	
Droitwich	Hereford & Worcester/Worcestershire	1837	2006	
Droxford	Hampshire	1837	2008	
Dulverton	Somerset	1855	1936	Abolished in 1838. Recreated 1855.
Dunstable	Bedfordshire	1964	1999	
Durham	Durham	1837	1938	
Durham Central	Durham	1938	2004	Abolished in 1971. Recreated 1974.
Durham Central & South Eastern	Durham	1971	1974	
Durham Eastern	Durham	1938	2006	
Durham North Eastern	Durham	1938	1974	
Durham North Western	Durham	1938	1974	
Durham Northern	Durham	1938	2004	
Durham South Eastern	Durham	1938	1971	
Durham South Western	Durham	1938	2000	
Durham Western	Durham	1938	2006	
Dursley	Gloucestershire	1837	1937	
Easington	Durham	1837	1938	
Easingwold	Yorkshire North Riding	1837	1936	
East Ashford	Kent	1837	1941	
East Cleveland	Cleveland	1974	1996	
East Dereham	Norfolk	1939	2012	
East Devon	Devon	1998	2007	
East Dorset	Dorset	1997	2005	
East Elloe	Lincolnshire	1936	2003	
East Grinstead	Sussex	1837	1935	
East Ham	Greater London	1965	1968	
East London	London	1838	1870	
East Preston	Sussex	1870	1935	
East Retford	Nottinghamshire	1837	2005	
East Staffordshire	Staffordshire	1974	2008	
East Stonehouse	Devon	1837	1937	
East Surrey	Surrey	2000	2008	
East Ward	Westmorland	1837	1937	
Eastbourne	East Sussex/Sussex	1837	2008	
Easthampstead	Berkshire	1837	1974	Abolished in 1937. Recreated 1967.
Eastleigh	Hampshire	1927	1932	
Eastry	Kent	1837	1941	
Ecclesall Bierlow	Yorkshire West Riding	1837	1935	
Ecclesfield	Yorkshire West Riding	1837	1850	
Edmonton	Middlesex	1837	1965	
Elham	Kent	1837	1941	
Ellesmere	Shropshire	1837	1935	
Ely	Cambridgeshire	1837	2007	
Epsom	Surrey	1837	1934	
Erewash	Derbyshire	1997	2013	
Erpingham	Norfolk	1837	1939	
Eton	Buckinghamshire	1837	1974	
Evesham	Worcestershire/Hereford & Worcester	1837	2006	
Ewecross	North Yorkshire/Yorkshire West Riding	1947	1998	
Exeter	Devon	1837	2007	
Exmoor	Somerset	1936	1974	
Fakenham	Norfolk	1939	2012	
Falmouth	Cornwall	1837	2007	
Fareham	Hampshire	1837	1932	
Faringdon	Berkshire	1837	1937	
Farnborough	Hampshire	1846	1869	
Farnham	Surrey	1837	1934	
Farnworth	Lancashire	1935	1974	
Farringdon	London	1837	1838	
Faversham	Kent	1837	1941	
Fenland	Cambridgeshire	1980	2007	
Finsbury	London	1930	1965	
Fleetwood	Lancashire	1974	1982	
Fleetwood & Fylde	Lancashire	1998	2005	
Flegg	Norfolk	1837	1925	
Foleshill	Warwickshire	1837	1932	
Folkestone	Kent	1941	1974	
Fordingbridge	Hampshire	1837	1932	
Forehoe	Norfolk	1837	1939	
Forest of Dean	Gloucestershire	1937	2006	
Freebridge Lynn	Norfolk	1837	1939	
Frome	Somerset	1837	1974	
Fulham	London/Middlesex	1875	2001	
Fylde	Lancashire	1837	1974	
Gainsborough	Lincolnshire	1837	2003	
Garstang	Lancashire	1837	1998	
Gipping	Suffolk	1935	1983	
Gipping & Hartismere	Suffolk	1983	2010	
Glanford Brigg	Lincolnshire	1837	1938	
Glendale	Northumberland	1837	1937	
Glossop	Derbyshire	1898	1974	
Gloucester	Gloucestershire	1837	2006	Abolished in 1937. Recreated 1974.
Gloucester City	Gloucestershire	1937	1974	
Gloucester Rural	Gloucestershire	1937	1974	
Godstone	Surrey	1837	1934	
Goole	Humberside/Yorkshire West Riding	1837	2002	
Gosport	Hampshire	1932	1974	
Grantham	Lincolnshire	1837	2003	Abolished in 1934. Recreated 1974.
Gravesend	Kent	1837	2003	Abolished in 1941. Recreated 1980.
Great Boughton	Cheshire	1837	1870	
Great Ouseburn	Yorkshire West Riding	1854	1947	
Great Yarmouth	Norfolk	1939	2012	
Grimsby	Humberside/Lincolnshire	1897	1996	
Guildford	Surrey	1837	1934	
Guiltcross	Norfolk	1837	1902	
Guisborough	Yorkshire North Riding	1837	1936	
Hailsham	East Sussex/Sussex	1837	1976	
Halifax	West Yorkshire	1837	2003	
Halton	Cheshire	1974	?	
Haltwhistle	Northumberland	1837	1937	
Hambledon	Surrey	1837	1934	
Hammersmith	Greater London	1915	2001	
Hampshire North	Hampshire	2001	2008	
Hampstead	Greater London/Middlesex	1848	1977	
Hardingstone	Northamptonshire	1837	1924	
Harrow	Middlesex	1947	1965	
Hartismere	Suffolk	1837	1983	
Hartley Wintney	Hampshire	1837	1932	
Haslingden	Lancashire	1837	1974	
Hastings	East Sussex/Sussex	1837	1977	
Hastings & Rother	East Sussex	1977	2008	
Havant	Hampshire	1837	1932	
Hayfield	Derbyshire	1838	1938	
Haywards Heath	West Sussex	1980	2010	
Headington	Oxfordshire	1837	1933	
Helmsley	Yorkshire North Riding	1837	1936	
Helston	Cornwall	1837	1936	
Hemsworth	Yorkshire West Riding	1850	1974	
Hendon	Greater London/Middlesex	1837	1999	
Henley	Oxfordshire	1837	2001	
Henstead	Norfolk	1837	1939	
Hereford	Herefordshire/Hereford & Worcester	1837	2008	
Hexham	Northumberland	1837	1937	
Heywood	Lancashire	1934	1974	
High Peak	Derbyshire	1837	2013	Abolished in 1838. Recreated 1974.
Highworth	Wiltshire	1837	1899	
Hinckley	Leicestershire	1837	2000	
Hitchin	Hertfordshire	1837	1897	
Holbeach	Lincolnshire	1837	1936	
Holbeck	Yorkshire West Riding	1862	1925	
Holborn	London/Middlesex	1837	1965	
Holderness	Yorkshire East Riding	1937	1974	
Hollingbourne	Kent	1837	1941	
Holsworthy	Devon	1837	1998	
Honiton	Devon	1837	1998	
Hoo	Kent	1837	1923	
Horncastle	Lincolnshire	1837	2003	
Horsham	West Sussex/Sussex	1837	2010	
Horwich	Lancashire	1935	1968	
Houghton le Spring	Durham	1837	1938	
Hove	East Sussex/Sussex	1935	1998	
Howden	Yorkshire East Riding	1837	1937	
Howdenshire	Yorkshire East Riding	1937	1974	
Hoxne	Suffolk	1837	1907	
Huddersfield	West Yorkshire/Yorkshire West Riding	1974	?	
Hungerford	Berkshire	1837	1937	
Hunslet	Yorkshire West Riding	1845	1929	
Huntingdon	Cambridgeshire/Huntingdonshire	1837	2007	
Huntingdonshire North	Huntingdonshire	1934	1968	
Hursley	Hampshire	1837	1838	
Hyde	Cheshire	1937	1974	
Hyndburn & Rossendale	Lancashire	1974	2005	
Ilkeston	Derbyshire	1938	1997	
Ince	Lancashire	1936	1974	
Ipswich	Suffolk	1837	2010	
Jarrow	Tyne & Wear	1974	2001	
Keighley	West Yorkshire	1837	2008	
Kendal	Cumbria/Westmorland	1837	2011	
Kensington	London/Middlesex	1837	1981	
Kerrier	Cornwall	1936	2007	
Kettering	Northamptonshire	1837	2010	
Ketton	Rutland	1934	1974	
Keynsham	Gloucestershire	1837	1936	
Kidderminster	Worcestershire/Hereford & Worcester	1837	2006	
Kings Lynn	Norfolk	1837	2012	
Kings Norton	Worcestershire	1837	1924	
Kingsbridge	Devon	1837	1998	
Kingsclere	Hampshire	1837	1932	
Kingsclere & Whitchurch	Hampshire	1932	2000	
Kingston	Surrey	1837	1934	
Kingswinford	Staffordshire	1934	1937	
Kingswood	Gloucestershire	1937	1974	
Kington	Hereford & Worcester	1974	1998	
Kington	Herefordshire	1871	1974	
Kirkdeighton	Yorkshire West Riding	1861	1869	
Kirkstall	Yorkshire West Riding	1862	1869	
Knaresborough	Yorkshire West Riding	1837	1946	
Knighton	Herefordshire/Radnorshire	1837	2008	
Lancaster	Lancashire	1837	2005	
Lanchester	Durham	1837	1938	Abolished in 1838. Recreated 1875.
Langport	Somerset	1837	1936	
Launceston	Cornwall	1837	2007	
Ledbury	Herefordshire/Hereford & Worcester	1837	2008	
Leeds North	Yorkshire West Riding	1929	1939	
Leeds South	Yorkshire West Riding	1929	1939	
Leek	Staffordshire	1837	1974	
Leicestershire Central	Leicestershire	1949	1997	
Leigh	Greater Manchester/Lancashire	1974	1995	
Leighton Buzzard	Bedfordshire	1837	1999	
Leominster	Herefordshire/Hereford & Worcester	1837	2008	
Lewes	East Sussex/Sussex	1837	2008	
Leyburn	Yorkshire North Riding	1837	1936	
Lichfield	Staffordshire	1837	2008	
Limehouse	London	1921	1926	
Lincoln	Lincolnshire	1837	2003	
Linton	Cambridgeshire	1837	1935	
Liskeard	Cornwall	1837	2007	
Littleborough	Lancashire	1936	1974	
Liverpool North	Lancashire	1934	1969	
Liverpool South	Lancashire	1934	1969	
Loddon	Norfolk	1837	1938	
Long Ashton	Somerset	1899	1936	
Longtown	Cumberland	1837	1939	
Lothingland	Suffolk	1935	1974	
Loughborough	Leicestershire	1837	2000	
Louth	Lincolnshire	1837	2003	
Lower Agbrigg	Yorkshire West Riding	1939	1974	
Ludlow	Shropshire	1837	2005	
Lunesdale	Lancashire	1869	1974	
