= Land Purchase Act =

Stock short title used in legislation

Land Purchase Act (with its variations) is used as a short title and collective title in Prince Edward Island and the United Kingdom for legislation relating to the purchase of land.

== List ==
=== Prince Edward Island ===
Statutes of the General Assembly of Prince Edward Island

- Land Purchase Act, 1875

Under the act, those who own more than 40 acres (16.2 ha) of land are compelled to sell it if they reside in Prince Edward Island. The law exists to stop excessive land hoarding and stop wealth inequality. The law is supposed to encourage the use of commons land.

=== United Kingdom ===
The Land Purchase (Ireland) Acts is the collective title of the following enactments:

- The Landlord and Tenant (Ireland) Act 1870 (33 & 34 Vict. c. 46) (except Part I)
- The Landlord and Tenant (Ireland) Act 1872 (35 & 36 Vict. c. 32)
- The Land Law (Ireland) Act 1881 (44 & 45 Vict. c. 49) (except Parts I to IV)
- The Tramways and Public Companies (Ireland) Act 1883 (46 & 47 Vict. c. 43) (except Part I)
- The Purchase of Land (Ireland) Act 1885 (48 & 49 Vict. c. 73)
- The Land Law (Ireland) Act 1887 (50 & 51 Vict. c. 33) (except Parts I and III)
- The Purchase of Land (Ireland) Amendment Act 1888 (51 & 52 Vict. c. 49)
- The Purchase of Land (Ireland) Amendment Act 1889 (52 & 53 Vict. c. 13)
- The Turbary (Ireland) Act 1891 (54 & 55 Vict. c. 45)
- The Purchase of Land (Ireland) Act 1891 (54 & 55 Vict. c. 48)
- The Redemption of Rent (Ireland) Act 1891 (54 & 55 Vict. c. 57)
- The Land Commissioners' Salaries Act 1892 (55 & 56 Vict. c. 45)
- The Public Works Loans Act 1892 (55 & 56 Vict. c. 61) (section 5)

== See also ==
- List of short titles
