= Trusts Act =

Stock short title used for legislation

Trusts Act (with its variations) is a stock short title used in Malaysia, New Zealand, Niue, Queensland and the United Kingdom for legislation relating to trusts.

== List ==
=== Australia ===
==== New South Wales ====
- The Trustees Act 1853
- The Trustee Act Amendment Act 1886
- The Trustee Act 1898 (No 4)
- The Trustee Act Amendment Act 1902 (No 98)
- The Trustees Audit Act 1912 (No 21)
- The Trustees Delegation of Powers Act 1915 (No 31)
- The Trustee Act 1925 (No 14)
- The Trustee (Amendment) Act 1929 (No 60)
- The Trustees Protection Act 1931 (No 28)
- The Trustee (Amendment) Act 1979 (No 189)
- The Trustee (Investment Powers) Amendment Act 1982 (No 35)
- The Trustee (Powers of Attorney) Amendment Act 1983 (No 28)
- The Trustee (Investments) Amendment Act 1983 (No 204)
- The Trustee (Amendment) Act 1984 (No 169)
- The Trustee (Trustees' Agents) Amendment Act 1985 (No 89)
- The Trustee (Amendment) Act 1987 (No 139)
- The Trustee (Amendment) Act 1993 (No 18)
- The Trustee Amendment Act 1996 (No 100)
- The Trustee Amendment (Discretionary Investments) Act 1997 (No 102)
- The Trust Property Act of 1862
- The Trust Property Act Amendment Act of 1893
- The Trust Property (Amendment) Act 1897 (No 38)
- The Trust Investments Act 1849
- The Trust Moneys Deposit Act 1857
- The Trust Funds Security Act 1858
- The Trustee and Wills (Emergency Provisions) Act 1940 (No 32)
- The Trustee and Directors Frauds Prevention Act 1858
- The Trustee Companies Act 1952
- The Trustee Companies Act 1964 (No 6)
- The Trustee Companies (Amendment) Act 1969 (No 6)
- The Trustee Companies (Amendment) Act 1972 (No 45)
- The Trustee Companies (Amendment) Act 1979 (No 186)
- The Trustee Companies (Amendment) Act 1982 (No 61)
- The Trustee Companies (Further Amendment) Act 1982 (No 173)
- The Trustee Companies (Amendment) Act 1983 (No 82)
- The Trustee Companies (Amendment) Act 1985 (No 88)
- The Trustee Companies (Amendment) Act 1986 (No 121)
- The Trustee Companies (Amendment) Act 1989 (No 42)
- The Trustee Companies (Further Amendment) Act 1989 (No 176)
- The Trustee Companies (Amendment) Act 1990 (No 98)
- The Trustee Companies Amendment Act 1997 (No 46)
- The Trustee Companies Amendment (Reserve Liabilities) Act 1998 (No 37)
- The Trustee Companies Amendment Act 2000 (No 39)
- The Trustee Companies Amendment Act 2009 (No 109)

==== Queensland ====
- The Trusts Act 1973

==== Tasmania ====
- The Trustee Act 1898
- The Trustee Act 1941 (5 Geo 6 No 17)
- The Trustee Act 1964 (No 6)
- The Trustee Act 1965 (No 7)
- The Trustee (Insured Housing Loans) Act 1970 (No 17)
- The Trustee Act 1970 (No 66)
- The Trustee Act 1973 (No 65)
- The Trustee Act 1976 (No 55)
- The Trustee Amendment Act 1979 (No 49)
- The Trustee Amendment Act 1981 (No 47)
- The Trustee Amendment Act 1985 (No 52)
- The Trustee Amendment Act (No 2) 1985 (No 18)
- The Trustee Amendment Act 1992 (No 35)
- The Trustee Amendment (Investment Powers) Act 1997 (No 64)
- The Trustee Amendment (Miscellaneous Amendments) Act 2006 (No 9)

==== Western Australia ====
- The Trustee Ordinance 1854 (17 Vict No 10)
- The Trustees Act 1900 (64 Vict No 17)
- The Trustees Act 1962 (No 78)
- The Trustees Act Amendment Act 1927 (No 7)
- The Trustees Protection Act 1931 (No 10)
- The Trustees Powers Act 1931 (No 9)
- The Trustees Powers Amendment Act 1935 (No 4)
- The Trustees Act Amendment Act 1951 (No 38)
- The Trustees Act Amendment Act 1955 (No 35)
- The Trustees Act Amendment Act (No 2) 1955 (No 54)
- The Trustees Act Amendment Act 1956 (No 39)
- The Trustees Act Amendment Act 1957 (No 15)
- The Trustees Act Amendment Act 1968 (No 18)
- The Trustees Amendment Act 1987 (No 84)
- The Trustees Amendment Act 1997 (No 1)
- The Trustee Investment Act 1889 (53 Vict No 14)
- The Trustees Colonial Investment Act 1900 (64 Vict No 12)
- The Trust Funds Investment Act 1924 (No 10)
- The Trust Funds Investment Act Amendment Act 1926 (No 4)
- The Trustee Companies Act 1987 (No 111)
- The Trustee Companies Amendment Act 1994 (No 42)
- The Trustee Companies (Commonwealth Regulation) Act 2011 (No 39)

==== Victoria ====
- The Trusts Act 1890
- The Trusts Act 1891
- The Trusts Act 1893
- The Trusts Act 1896
- The Trusts Act 1901
- The Trusts Act 1906
- The Trusts Act 1915
- The Trusts Act 1915 (No 2)
- The Trusts Act 1915 (No 3)
- The Trusts (War Loan) Act 1915
- The Trusts Act 1920
- The Trusts Act 1922
- The Trust Funds Act 1897
- The Trust Funds Act 1902
- The Trust Funds Act 1902 (No 2)
- The Trust Funds Act 1906
- The Trustees' Investments Act 1922
- The Trustee Act 1928
- The Trustee Act 1931
- The Trustee (Investments) Act 1933
- The Trustee Act 1936
- The Trustee Act 1939
- The Trustee Act 1953
- The Trustee (Amendment) Act 1953
- The Trustee Act 1958
- The Trustee (Amendment) Act 1959
- The Trustee (Mortgages) Act 1959
- The Trustee (Mortgages) Act 1962
- The Trustee (Variation of Trusts) Act 1962
- The Trustee (Amendment) Act 1969
- The Trustee (Authorized Investments) Act 1969
- The Trustee (Authorized Investments) Act 1978
- The Trustee (Authorized Investments) Act 1981
- The Trustee (Authorized Investments) Act 1982
- The Trustee (Amendment) Act 1984
- The Trustee (Secondary Mortgage Market Amendment) Act 1985
- The Trustee (Amendment) Act 1986
- The Trustee (Amendment) Act 1989
- The Trustee and Trustee Companies (Amendment) Act 1995
- The Trustee Companies Act 1928
- The Trustee Companies Act 1944
- The Trustee Companies (Commission) Act 1953
- The Trustee Companies Act 1957
- The Trustee Companies Act 1958
- The Trustee Companies (Amalgamation) Act 1960
- The Trustee Companies (Amalgamation) Act 1962
- The Trustee Companies (The Perpetual Executors and Trustees Association of Australia Limited) Act 1963
- The Trustee Companies (Affidavits) Act 1964
- The Trustee Companies (Burns Philp Trustee Company Limited) Act 1969
- The Trustee Companies (Perpetual Trustees Australia Limited) Act 1970
- The Trustee Companies (Equity Trustees) Act 1971
- The Trustee Companies (National Trustees) Act 1972
- The Trustee Companies (Sandhurst and Northern District Trustees Executors and Agency Company Limited) Act 1972
- The Trustee Companies (Commission) Act 1975
- The Trustee Companies (Union-Fidelity) Amendment Act 1976
- The Trustee Companies (Amendment) Act 1978
- The Trustee Companies (Amendment) Act 1979
- The Trustee Companies (Trustees Executors) Act 1979
- The Trustee Companies (Amendment) Act 1983
- The Trustee Companies Act 1984
- The Trustee Companies (Amendment) Act 1988
- The Trustee Companies Legislation Amendment Act 2010 (No 17)

=== Malaysia ===
- The Trusts (State Legislatures Competency) Act 1949

=== New Zealand ===
- The Trusts Act 2019 (No 38)

=== Niue ===
- The Trusts Act 1994

=== United Kingdom ===
- The Variation of Trusts Act 1958 (6 & 7 Eliz. 2. c. 53)
- The Trusts (Scotland) Act 1961 (9 & 10 Eliz. 2. c. 57)
- The Trust Investment Act 1889 (52 & 53 Vict. c. 32)
- The Trustee Act 1850 (13 & 14 Vict. c. 60)
- The Trustee Act 1852 (15 & 16 Vict. c. 55)
- The Trustee Act 1888 (51 & 52 Vict. c. 59)
- The Trustee Act 1893 (56 & 57 Vict. c. 53)
- The Trustee Act 1925 (15 & 16 Geo. 5. c. 19)
- The Trustee Act 2000 (c. 29)
- The Trustee Act (Northern Ireland) 1958 (c. 23 (N.I.))
- An Act for better securing trust funds, and for the relief of trustees (10 & 11 Vict. c. 96) is sometimes called the Trustee Relief Act 1847
- 11 & 12 Vict. c. 68 is sometimes called the Trustee Relief (Ireland) Act 1848
- An Act for the further relief of trustees (12 & 13 Vict. c. 74) is sometimes called the Trustee Relief Act 1849

The Trusts (Scotland) Acts 1861 to 1891 was the collective title of the following acts:

- The Trusts (Scotland) Act 1861 (24 & 25 Vict. c. 84)
- The Trusts (Scotland) Act 1867 (30 & 31 Vict. c. 97)
- The Trusts (Scotland) Amendment Act 1891 (47 & 48 Vict. c. 63)
- The Trusts (Scotland) Amendment Act 1867 Amendment Act 1887 (50 & 51 Vict. c. 18)
- The Trusts (Scotland) Amendment Act 1891 (54 & 55 Vict. c. 44)

The Charitable Trusts Acts 1853 to 1894 was the collective title of the following acts:

- The Charitable Trusts Act 1853 (16 & 17 Vict. c. 137)
- The Charitable Trusts Amendment Act 1855 (18 & 19 Vict. c. 124)
- The Charitable Trusts Act 1860 (23 & 24 Vict. c. 136)
- The Charitable Trusts Act 1862 (25 & 26 Vict. c. 112)
- The Charitable Trusts Act 1869 (32 & 33 Vict. c. 110)
- The Charitable Trusts Act 1887 (50 & 51 Vict. c. 49)
- The Charitable Trusts (Recovery) Act 1891 (54 & 55 Vict. c. 17)
- The Charitable Trusts (Places of Religious Worship) Amendment Act 1894 (57 & 58 Vict. c. 35)

The Trustee Appointment Acts 1850 to 1890 is the collective title of the following acts:

- The Trustee Appointment Act 1850 (13 & 14 Vict. c. 28)
- The Trustee Appointment Act 1869 (32 & 33 Vict. c. 26)
- The Trustee Appointment Act 1890 (53 & 54 Vict. c. 19)

The Trustee Savings Banks Acts 1863 to 1893 was the collective title of the following acts:

- The Trustee Savings Banks Act 1863 (26 & 27 Vict. c. 87)
- So much of the Savings Banks Act 1887 (50 & 51 Vict. c. 40) as relates to trustee savings banks
- The Trustee Savings Banks Act 1887 (50 & 51 Vict. c. 47)
- The Savings Banks Act 1891 (54 & 55 Vict. c. 21)
- The Savings Banks Act 1893 (56 & 57 Vict. c. 69)

== See also ==
- List of short titles
