= Clerk of the Parliaments Act 1824 =

Act of the Parliament of the United Kingdom

Clerk of the Parliaments Act 1824 (Note: The citation of this act by this short title was authorised by section 1 of, and the first schedule to, the Short Titles Act 1896. Due to the repeal of those provisions it is now authorised by section 19(2) of the Interpretation Act 1978. Paragraph 2(1) of schedule 3 to the Statute Law (Repeals) Act 1978 substituted the words "The Clerk of the Parliaments Act 1824" for the words "The Clerk of Parliaments Act 1824" in first schedule of 1896 act.)
- Act of Parliament
- Parliament of the United Kingdom
- Long title: An Act for better regulating the Office of Clerk of the Parliaments.
- Citation: 5 Geo. 4. c. 82
- Territorial extent: United Kingdom

Dates
- Royal assent: 21 June 1824
- Commencement: 21 June 1824 (Note: The Acts of Parliament (Commencement) Act 1793.)

Other legislation
- Amended by: Statute Law Revision Act 1873; Statute Law Revision (No. 2) Act 1888; Statute Law Revision Act 1890; Constitutional Reform Act 2005

Status: Amended

Text of statute as originally enacted

Revised text of statute as amended

Text of the Clerk of the Parliaments Act 1824 as in force today (including any amendments) within the United Kingdom, from legislation.gov.uk.

The Clerk of the Parliaments Act 1824 (5 Geo. 4. c. 82) (originally Clerk of Parliaments Act 1824) is an act of the Parliament of the United Kingdom that covers the appointment of the Clerk of the Parliaments and her deputies.
