= Parliamentary Costs Act =

Stock short title used for UK legislation

Parliamentary Costs Act is a stock short title used in the United Kingdom for legislation relating to parliamentary costs.

== List ==
- The Parliamentary Costs Act 2006

The Parliamentary Costs Acts 1847 to 1879 is the collective title of the following acts:

- The House of Commons Costs Taxation Act 1847 (10 & 11 Vict. c. 69)
- The House of Lords Costs Taxation Act 1849 (12 & 13 Vict. c. 78)
- The Parliamentary Costs Act 1865 (28 & 29 Vict. c. 27)
- The Parliamentary Costs Act 1867 (30 & 31 Vict. c. 136)
- The Parliamentary Costs Act 1871 (34 & 35 Vict. c. 3)
- The House of Commons Costs Taxation Act 1879 (42 & 43 Vict. c. 17)

== See also ==
- List of short titles
