= Purchase of Land (Ireland) Act 1885 =

Act of the Parliament of the United Kingdom

Purchase of Land (Ireland) Act 1885 (Note: Section 1.)
- Act of Parliament
- Parliament of the United Kingdom
- Long title: An Act to provide greater facilities for the Sale of Land to occupying Tenants in Ireland.
- Citation: 48 & 49 Vict. c. 73
- Territorial extent: United Kingdom

Dates
- Royal assent: 14 August 1885
- Commencement: 14 August 1885 (Note: The Acts of Parliament (Commencement) Act 1793.)
Other legislation
Amends	Land Law (Ireland) Act 1881
Amended by	Land Law (Ireland) Act 1887; Purchase of Land (Ireland) Amendment Act 1889; Purchase of Land (Ireland) Act 1891; Land Law (Ireland) Act 1896; Statute Law Revision Act 1898; Irish Land Act 1903; Statute Law Revision Act 1950; Judicature (Northern Ireland) Act 1978; Property (Northern Ireland) Order 1997

Status: Amended

Text of statute as originally enacted

The Purchase of Land (Ireland) Act 1885 (48 & 49 Vict. c. 73), commonly known as the Ashbourne Act is an act of the Parliament of the United Kingdom, passed by a Conservative Party government under Lord Salisbury. It extended the terms that had been achieved under the Kilmainham Treaty. It set up a £5 million fund and any tenant who wanted to buy land could do so. One could take a loan from the government and would pay it back in monthly installments.

The act was effected by, and informally named for, Edward Gibson, 1st Baron Ashbourne, the then Lord Chancellor of Ireland.

The loans would be paid back over 48 years and the rate of interest would be fixed at 4% per annum. This made the loan repayments affordable, and more people could benefit from the Act as they would now be able to buy their own land. It strengthened the original Irish Land Acts as they had enabled tenants to buy land in restricted circumstances. The Ashbourne Act formally gave this right to the tenants and funded the Land Commission.

It has been argued that the act was passed to win the support of Charles Stewart Parnell. Salisbury knew that his government would not last long as the Liberal Party had an overall majority. Salisbury realised that he would need Irish Party support to maintain power. Therefore, the Ashbourne act was a way to win over Parnell while keeping William Ewart Gladstone on the opposition benches. This failed, as Gladstone came into government soon after and introduced the Government of Ireland Bill 1886; which however also failed.

The Ashbourne Act was extended in 1889. It increased the government grants for loans by a further £5 million and became law in August 1891.

It was one of the Land Purchase (Ireland) Acts.

== Subsequent developments ==
The following provisions were repealed by section 1(1) of, and the first schedule to, the Statute Law Revision Act 1950 (14 Geo. 6. c. 6), which came into force on 23 May 1950.

- Sections 2 and 3 so far as unrepealed.
- Section 5 so far as unrepealed.
- Section six.
- Section 9 so far as unrepealed.
- Sections 10, 11 and 13.
- Section 14 so far as unrepealed.
- Section 17 so far as unrepealed.
- Sections 18, 20 and 21.
- Section 22 so far as unrepealed.

== See also ==
- Irish Land Acts
