= Lunacy Act =

Stock short title used in UK legislation

Lunacy Act (with its variations) is a stock short title used in the United Kingdom for legislation relating to mental illness.

== List ==
- The Lunacy Act 1845 (8 & 9 Vict. c. 100)

The Lunacy (Scotland) Acts 1857 to 1887 was the collective title of the following acts:

- The Lunacy (Scotland) Act 1857 (20 & 21 Vict. c. 71)
- The Lunacy (Scotland) Act 1862 (25 & 26 Vict. c. 54)
- The Lunacy (Scotland) Act 1868 (29 & 30 Vict. c. 51)
- The Criminal and Dangerous Lunatics (Scotland) Amendment Act 1871 (34 & 35 Vict. c. 55)
- The Lunacy Districts (Scotland) Act 1887 (50 & 51 Vict. c. 39)

The Lunacy (Ireland) Acts 1821 to 1890 was the collective title of the following acts:

- The Lunacy (Ireland) Act 1821 (1 & 2 Geo. 4. c 33)
- The Lunacy (Ireland) Act 1826 (7 Geo. 4. c 14)
- The Criminal Lunatics (Ireland) Act 1838 (1 & 2 Vict. c. 27)
- The Private Lunatic Asylums (Ireland) Act 1842 (5 & 6 Vict. c. 123)
- The Central Criminal Lunatic Asylum (Ireland) Act 1845 (8 & 9 Vict. c. 107)
- The Lunatic Asylums (Ireland) Act 1846 (9 & 10 Vict. c. 115)
- The Trustee Act 1850 (13 & 14 Vict. c. 60)
- The Trustee Act 1852 (15 & 16 Vict. c. 55)
- The Lunatic Asylums Repayment of Advances (Ireland) Act 1855 (18 & 19 Vict. c. 109)
- The Lunatic Asylums Superannuations (Ireland) Act 1856 (19 & 20 Vict. c. 99)
- The Lunacy (Ireland) Act 1867 (30 & 31 Vict. c. 118)
- The Lunatic Asylums (Ireland) Accounts Audit Act 1868 (31 & 32 Vict. c. 97)
- The Lunacy Regulation (Ireland) Act 1871 (34 & 35 Vict. c 22)
- The Private Lunatic Asylums (Ireland) Act 1874 (37 & 38 Vict. c. 74)
- The Lunatic Asylums (Ireland) Act 1875 (38 & 39 Vict. c. 67)
- The Lunactic Asylums Loans (Ireland) Act 1878 (41 & 42 Vict. c. 24)
- The Pauper Lunatic Asylums (Ireland) Superannuation Act 1890 (53 & 54 Vict. c. 31)

== See also ==
- List of short titles
