= Short Titles Act =

Stock short title used for legislation

Short Titles Act (with its variations) is a stock short title used for legislation in Ireland and the United Kingdom which retroactively confers short titles on a large number of earlier pieces of legislation. The Bill for an Act with this short title will have been known as a Short Titles Bill during its passage through Parliament.

Halsbury's Laws said that Short Titles Acts are law reform Acts.

In modern times, an Act will authorize a short title to refer to itself, and occasionally additional or alternative short titles are provided, as for example the Senior Courts Act 1981.

== List ==
=== Ireland ===
- The Short Titles Act 1962
- The Short Titles Acts 1896 to 2007 is the collective title of the Short Titles Act 1896, the Short Titles Act 1962, and sections 4 to 7 and 10(2) of, and in so far as it relates to section 4, Schedule 1 to, the Statute Law Revision Act 2007.
- The Short Titles Acts 1896 to 2009 is the collective title of the Short Titles Acts 1896 to 2007 and sections 4 and 5 and 7(2) of, and in so far as it relates to section 4, Schedule 1 to, the Statute Law Revision Act 2009.
- The Short Titles Acts 1896 to 2012 is the collective title of the Short Titles Acts 1896 to 2009 and sections 4 and 5 and 8(3) of, and in so far as it relates to section 4, Schedule 1 to, the Statute Law Revision Act 2012.

=== United Kingdom ===
Short Titles Act (Northern Ireland) 1951
- Act of Parliament
- Parliament of Northern Ireland
- Long title: An Act to confer short titles on certain Acts of the Irish Parliament and to facilitate the citation of enactments by short titles.
- Citation: 1951 c. 1 (N.I.)
- Territorial extent: Northern Ireland Act 1951

Dates
- Royal assent: 23 January 1951
- Commencement: 23 January 1951 (Note: The Acts of Parliament (Commencement) Act 1793.)

Other legislation
- Amended by: Statute Law (Repeals) Act 1995

Status: Amended

- The Short Titles Act 1892 (55 & 56 Vict. c. 10)
- The Short Titles Act 1896 (59 & 60 Vict. c. 14)
- The Statute Law Revision Act 1948 (11 & 12 Geo. 6. c. 62) under section 5 and the Second Schedule
- The Short Titles Act (Northern Ireland) 1951 (c. 1 (N.I.))
- The Statute Law Revision (Scotland) Act 1964 (1964 c. 80) under section 2 and Schedule 2
- The Statute Law (Repeals) Act 1977 (1977 c. 18) under section 3 and Schedule 3
- The Statute Law (Repeals) Act 1978 (1978 c. 45) under section 2 and Schedule 3

== See also ==
- List of short titles
