= William Napier Bruce =

Bruce in 1931.

The Honourable William Napier Bruce, CH CB (18 January 1858 – 20 March 1936) was a British educationalist and lawyer.

== Life ==
The son of Henry Bruce, 1st Baron Aberdare by his second wife Norah Creina Blanche, Bruce was educated at Harrow School and Balliol College, Oxford, where he read the Greats. In 1882, he married Emily McMurdo, daughter of General Sir William McMurdo. They had one son and one daughter.

In 1883, Bruce was called to the bar from Lincoln's Inn. In 1886, he joined the Charity Commission as Assistant Commissioner under the Endowed Schools Acts, where he served until 1900. In 1900, he was appointed Assistant Secretary to the Board of Education, and in April 1903 he was promoted to Principal Assistant Secretary and appointed in charge of a division organized to deal with secondary schools. In 1929, he became Pro-Chancellor of the University of Wales, in succession to Lord Kenyon.

He was appointed a Companion of the Order of the Bath in 1905 and a Member of the Order of the Companions of Honour in 1935. He died in Bath in 1936.
