= County Courts Act =

Stock short title used for UK legislation

County Courts Act (with its variations) is a stock short title used for legislation in the United Kingdom and Victoria relating to county courts.

The Bill for an Act with this short title may have been known as a County Courts Bill during its passage through Parliament.

County Courts Acts may be a generic name either for legislation bearing that short title or for all legislation which relates to county courts.

== List ==
=== United Kingdom ===
The County Courts Act 1846 (9 & 10 Vict. c. 95)
The County Courts Act 1849 (12 & 13 Vict. c. 101)
The County Courts Act 1850 (13 & 14 Vict. c. 61) (County Courts Extension Act 1850)
The County Courts Act 1852 (15 & 16 Vict. c. 54)
The County Courts Act 1856 (19 & 20 Vict. c. 108)
The County Courts Act 1858 (21 & 22 Vict. c. 74)
The County Courts Act 1859 (22 & 23 Vict. c. 57)
The County Courts Act 1865 (28 & 29 Vict. c. 99) (County Courts Equitable Jurisdiction Act)
The County Courts Act 1866 (29 & 30 Vict. c. 14)
The County Courts Act 1867 (30 & 31 Vict. c. 142)
The County Courts Admiralty Jurisdiction Act 1868 (31 & 32 Vict. c. 71)
The County Court (Buildings) Act 1870 (33 & 34 Vict. c. 15)
The County Courts Act 1875 (38 & 39 Vict. c. 50)
The County Courts (Costs and Salaries) Act 1882 (45 & 46 Vict. c. 57)
The County Courts (Expenses) Act 1887 (50 & 51 Vict. c. 3)
The County Courts (Investment) Act 1900 (63 & 64 Vict. c. 47)
The County Courts Act 1924 (14 & 15 Geo. 5. c. 17)
The County Courts (Amendment) Act 1934 (24 & 25 Geo. 5. c. 17)
The County Courts Act 1934 (24 & 25 Geo. 5. c. 53)
The County Courts Act 1955 (4 & 5 Eliz. 2. c. 8)
The County Courts Act 1959 (7 & 8 Eliz. 2. c. 22)
The County Courts (Jurisdiction) Act 1963 (11 & 12 Eliz. 2. c. 53)
The County Courts Act 1984 (c. 28)

The County Courts Acts 1888 to 1919 was the collective title of the following acts:

- The County Courts Act 1888 (51 & 52 Vict. c. 43)
- The County Courts Act 1903 (3 Edw. 7. c. 42)
- The County Court Judges (Retirement Pensions and Deputies) Act 1919 (9 & 10 Geo. 5. c. 70)
- The County Courts Act 1919 (9 & 10 Geo. 5. c. 70)

Ireland

The Civil Bill Courts in Ireland played a similar judicial role to the County Courts in England.

The County Courts (Ireland) Acts 1851 to 1889 was the collective title of the following acts:

- The Civil Bill Courts (Ireland) Act 1851 (14 & 15 Vict. c. 57)
- The Civil Bill Courts Procedure Amendment Act (Ireland) 1864 (27 & 28 Vict. c. 99)
- The Civil Bill Courts Procedure Amendment Act (Ireland) 1871 (34 & 35 Vict. c. 99)
- The Civil Bill Courts (Ireland) Act 1874 (37 & 38 Vict. c. 66)
- The Chairman of Quarter Sessions (Ireland) Jurisdiction Act 1876 (39 & 40 Vict. c. 71)
- The County Officers and Courts (Ireland) Act 1877 (40 & 41 Vict. c. 56)
- The County Court Amendment (Ireland) Act 1882 (45 & 46 Vict. c. 29)
- The County Court Appeals (Ireland) Act 1889 (52 & 53 Vict. c. 48)

=== Victoria ===
- The County Court Act 1890 (No 1078)

== See also ==
List of short titles
