= Tramways Act =

Stock short title used for legislation

Tramways Act is a stock short title used in India, New Zealand and the United Kingdom for legislation relating to tramways.

== List ==
=== India ===
- The Indian Tramways Act, 1886
- The Indian Tramways Act, 1902

Bengal

- The Bengal Tramways Act, 1883
- The Calcutta Tramways Act, 1880
- The Calcutta Tramways Act, 1894
- The Calcutta Tramways Act, 1951

=== New Zealand ===
- The Tramways Act 1872 (36 Vict No 22)

=== United Kingdom ===
- The Tramways Act 1870 (33 & 34 Vict. c. 78)
- The Military Tramways Act 1887 (50 & 51 Vict. c. 65)
- The Tramways Orders Confirmation (No. 3) Act 1881 (44 & 45 Vict. c. clxiv)
- The Tramways Orders Confirmation (No. 1) Act 1885 (48 & 49 Vict. c. lxvi)
- The Tramways Orders Confirmation (No. 2) Act 1887 (50 & 51 Vict. c. cxxiii)
- The Tramways Orders Confirmation (No. 1) Act 1890 (53 & 54 Vict. c. clxxxi)
- The Worcester Tramways Act 1901 (1 Edw. 7. c. cxci)

The Tramways (Ireland) Acts 1860 to 1895 is the collective title of the following acts:

- The Tramways (Ireland) Act 1860 (23 & 24 Vict. c. 152)
- The Tramways (Ireland) Amendment Act 1861 (24 & 25 Vict. c. 102)
- The Tramways (Ireland) Amendment Act 1871 (34 & 35 Vict. c. 114)
- The Tramways (Ireland) Amendment (Dublin) Act 1876 (39 & 40 Vict. c. 65)
- The Tramways (Ireland) Amendment Act 1881 (44 & 45 Vict. c. 17)
- The Tramways and Public Companies (Ireland) Act 1883 (46 & 47 Vict. c. 43)
- The Light Railways (Ireland) Act 1889 (52 & 53 Vict. c. 66)
- The Railways (Ireland) Act 1890 (53 & 54 Vict. c. 52)
- The Transfer of Railways (Ireland) Act 1890 (54 & 55 Vict. c. 2)
- The Tramways (Ireland) Amendment Act 1891 (54 & 55 Vict. c. 42)
- The Tramways (Ireland) Act 1895 (58 & 59 Vict. c. 20)

== See also ==
- List of short titles
