= Tramways Act 1870 =

Act of the Parliament of the United Kingdom

Tramways Act 1870 (Note: Section 1.)
- Act of Parliament
- Parliament of the United Kingdom
- Long title: An Act to facilitate the construction and to regulate the working of Tramways.
- Citation: 33 & 34 Vict. c. 78
- Territorial extent: England and Wales; Scotland; (Note: Section 2.)

Dates
- Royal assent: 9 August 1870
- Commencement: 9 August 1870 (Note: The Acts of Parliament (Commencement) Act 1793.)
Other legislation
Amended by	Local Government Act 1933; Local Government (Scotland) Act 1947; Highways Act 1959; Statute Law (Repeals) Act 1986; Transport and Works Act 1992

Status: Amended

Text of statute as originally enacted

Revised text of statute as amended

Text of the Tramways Act 1870 as in force today (including any amendments) within the United Kingdom, from legislation.gov.uk.

The Tramways Act 1870 (33 & 34 Vict. c. 78) is an act of the Parliament of the United Kingdom that was an important step in the development of urban transport in United Kingdom. Street tramways had originated in the United States, and were introduced to UK by George Francis Train in the 1860s, the first recorded installation being a short line from Woodside Ferry to Birkenhead Park in the town of Birkenhead. However, when Train started laying lines on top of the highway in London, he was arrested and fined, although he thought he had obtained official permission.

The act attempted to promote this new means of transport by clarifying and regulating the legal position. It authorised local boroughs or urban district councils to grant a 21-year concession to a private tramway operator. The operator could construct the track as part of the concession but was responsible for the repair of the public highway between the tracks and a short distance either side. The local authority could construct the track themselves if they wished to retain complete control of the highway, but they were not allowed to operate trams.

At the conclusion of the lease, the local authority could purchase the complete undertaking, including the trams and horses (or, in the case of a steam tramway, the locomotives and trailers). This was at a normal asset valuation, which took account of depreciation, and not a valuation of the business as a going concern. This so-called "scrap iron clause" proved to be a disincentive to investment and improvement in later years, and in some locations was even said to be a disincentive to the capitalisation of new undertakings.

Several sections of the act were later repealed or superseded by other legislation, including the Light Railways Act 1896 (59 & 60 Vict. c. 48). Most notably, local authorities were given the right to construct and operate their own tramways under the newer acts, and municipal ownership became the norm when the original concessions expired.

== See also ==
- Tramways Act
