= Private Legislation Procedure (Scotland) Act 1936 =

Act of the Parliament of the United Kingdom

Private Legislation Procedure (Scotland) Act 1936 (Note: Section 20.)
- Act of Parliament
- Parliament of the United Kingdom
- Long title: An Act to consolidate the enactments relating to the procedure for obtaining parliamentary powers by way of Provisional Orders in matters affecting Scotland.
- Citation: 26 Geo. 5 & 1 Edw. 8. c. 52
- Territorial extent: United Kingdom

Dates
- Royal assent: 31 July 1936
- Commencement: 31 July 1936 (Note: The Acts of Parliament (Commencement) Act 1793.)

Other legislation
- Amends: See § Repealed enactments
- Repeals/revokes: See § Repealed enactments
- Amended by: Local Government (Scotland) Act 1947; Statute Law Revision Act 1950; Law Reform (Miscellaneous Provisions) (Scotland) Act 1985; Transport and Works Act 1992; Statute Law (Repeals) Act 1993; Local Government etc. (Scotland) Act 1994; Scotland Act 1998; Parliamentary Costs Act 2006

Status: Amended

Text of statute as originally enacted

Revised text of statute as amended

Text of the Private Legislation Procedure (Scotland) Act 1936 as in force today (including any amendments) within the United Kingdom, from legislation.gov.uk.

The Private Legislation Procedure (Scotland) Act 1936 (26 Geo. 5 & 1 Edw. 8. c. 52) is an act of the Parliament of the United Kingdom that consolidated enactments related to the procedure for obtaining provisional orders in matters affecting Scotland.

Private legislation that mainly relates to Scotland is dealt with under the act.

== Provisions ==
=== Repealed enactments ===
Section 19 of the act repealed 4 enactments, listed in the schedule to the act.

| Citation | Short title | Extent of repeal |
|---|---|---|
| 62 & 63 Vict. c. 47 | Private Legislation Procedure (Scotland) Act 1899 | The whole act. |
| 3 Edw. 7. c. 9 | County Councils (Bills in Parliament) Act 1903 | Section two, except in so far as it provides that section one shall not apply to Scotland. |
| 3 Edw. 7. c. 33 | Burgh Police (Scotland) Act 1903 | Section fifty-five, in so far as it relates to Bills or Provisional Orders under the Private Legislation Procedure (Scotland) Act 1899 and the Private Legislation Procedure (Scotland) Act 1933. |
| 23 & 24 Geo. 5. c. 37 | Private Legislation Procedure (Scotland) Act 1933 | The whole act. |

== Subsequent developments ==
Section 1(4) of the act was amended by section 24 of the Transport and Works Act 1992 with effect from 1 January 1993, to add a reference to orders made under that Act. Section 1(5) was inserted by paragraph 5 of schedule 8 to the Scotland Act 1998 with effect from 1 July 1999, providing that the procedure under the act does not apply to matters within the legislative competence of the Scottish Parliament. Sections 6 and 9 were amended by the Parliamentary Costs Act 2006 with effect from 1 April 2007.
