= Coroners Act =

Stock short title used for legislation

Coroners Act is a stock short title used in New Zealand, Ireland and the United Kingdom for legislation relating to coroners.

== List ==
=== New Zealand ===
The Coroners Amendment Act 2003 (No 67)
The Coroners Amendment Act 2004 (No 40)
The Coroners Act 2006 (No 38)
The Coroners Act 1988 Amendment Act 2007 (No 5)
The Coroners Act 2006 Amendment Act 2007 (No 6)
The Coroners Amendment Act 2010 (No 56)

=== United Kingdom ===
Acts of the Parliament of the United Kingdom

The Coroners Act 1844 (7 & 8 Vict. c. 92)
The Coroners Act 1887 (50 & 51 Vict. c. 71)
The Coroners Act 1892 (55 & 56 Vict. c. 56)
The Coroners (Amendment) Act 1926 (16 & 17 Geo. 5. c. 59)
The Coroners Act 1954 (2 & 3 Eliz. 2. c. 31)
The Coroners Act 1980 (c. 38)
The Coroners Juries Act 1983 (c. 31)
The Coroners Act 1988 (c. 13)
The Coroners and Justice Act 2009 (c. 25)

The Coroners (Ireland) Acts 1829 to 1881 was the collective title of the following Acts:

The Coroners (Ireland) Act 1829 (10 Geo. 4. c. 37)
The Coroners (Ireland) Act 1836 (6 & 7 Will. 4. c. 89)
The Coroners (Ireland) Act 1846 (9 & 10 Vict. c. 37)
The Borough Coroner (Ireland) Act 1860 (23 & 24 Vict. c. 74)
The Coroners (Ireland) Act 1881 (44 & 45 Vict. c. 35)

Act of the Parliament of Northern Ireland

The Coroners Act (Northern Ireland) 1959 (c. 15) (NI)

=== Ireland ===
Coroners (Qualification) Act 1924
Coroners (Amendment) Act 1927
Coroners (Amendment) Act 1947
Coroners Act 1962
Coroners (Amendment) Act 2005
Coroners (Amendment) Act 2019

== See also ==
- List of short titles
