= Coroners Act 2006 =

Act of Parliament in New Zealand

The Coroners Act 2006 is an act of the Parliament of New Zealand which completely reformed the coronial services, introduced the office of Chief Coroner and clarified matters relating to remuneration and working conditions of coroners.

Coroner's inquests in New Zealand are inquisitorial rather than adversarial, fact-finding exercises rather than guilt-apportioning methods.

The Act was prompted by a 2000 New Zealand Law Commission report which recommended a number of changes.

== See also ==
- Coroners Act
