= Public Schools Act =

Stock short title used for legislation

Public Schools Act (with its variations) is a stock short title used in Manitoba, New South Wales and the United Kingdom for legislation relating to public schools.

== List ==
=== Manitoba ===
- The Public Schools Act, CCSM c P250

=== New South Wales ===
- Public Schools Act of 1866

=== United Kingdom ===
- The Public Schools (Shrewsbury and Harrow Schools Property) Act 1873 (36 & 37 Vict. c. 41)
- The Public Schools (Eton College Property) Act 1873 (36 & 37 Vict. c. 62)

The Public Schools Acts 1868 to 1873 is the collective title of the following acts:

- The Public Schools Act 1868 (31 & 32 Vict. c. 118)
- The Public Schools Act 1869 (32 & 33 Vict. c. 58)
- The Public Schools Act 1871 (34 & 35 Vict. c. 60)
- The Public Schools (Shrewsbury and Harrow Schools Property) Act 1873 (36 & 37 Vict. c. 41)
- The Public Schools (Eton College Property) Act 1873 (36 & 37 Vict. c. 62)

== See also ==
- List of short titles
