= Schools Act =

Stock short title used for legislation

Schools Act (with its variations) is a stock short title used in Canada and the United Kingdom for legislation relating to schools.

== Canada ==
Alberta

- School Act, RSA 2000, c S-3
- School Amendment Act, RSA 2000, c 30 (Supp)

British Columbia

- School Act, RSBC 1996, c 412

New Brunswick

- Schools Act, SNB c S-5.1 , replaced by the Education Act (S.N.B. 1997, c. E-1.12)

Newfoundland and Labrador

- Schools Act, 1997, SNL 1997, c S-12.2

Prince Edward Island

- School Act, RSPEI 1988, c S-2
- School Act, RSPEI 1988, c S-2.1

== South Africa ==
- The South African Schools Act, 1996 (c 78)

== United Kingdom ==
- The Education (Schools) Act 1992 (c. 38)
- The Education (Schools) Act 1997 (c. 59)
- The Schools (Health Promotion and Nutrition) (Scotland) Act 2007 (asp 15)
- The Schools (Consultation) (Scotland) Act 2010 (asp 2)
- The Children, Schools and Families Act 2010 (c. 26)
- The Army Schools Act 1891 (54 & 55 Vict. c. 16)
- The Nursery Education and Grant-Maintained Schools Act 1996 (c. 50)
- The Scottish Schools (Parental Involvement) Act 2006 (asp 8)
- The School Sites Act (Northern Ireland) 1928 (c. 8) (NI)

The Endowed Schools Acts 1869 to 1889 was the collective title of the following acts:

- The Endowed Schools Act 1869 (32 & 33 Vict. c. 56)
- The Endowed Schools Act 1873 (36 & 37 Vict. c. 87)
- The Endowed Schools Act 1874 (37 & 38 Vict. c. 87)
- The Welsh Intermediate Education Act 1889 (52 & 53 Vict. c. 40)

The Endowed Schools Acts 1869 to 1908 was the collective title of the Endowed Schools (Masters) Act 1908 (8 Edw. 7. c. 39) and the Endowed Schools Acts 1869 to 1889.

The Endowed Schools Acts 1869 to 1948 was the collective title of the Education (Miscellaneous Provisions) Act 1948 (11 & 12 Geo. 6. c. 40) and the Endowed Schools Acts 1869 to 1908.

The Reformatory Schools Act 1866 and 1872 was the collective title of the Reformatory Schools Act 1866 (29 & 30 Vict. c. 117) and Part I of the Reformatory and Industrial Schools Acts Amendment Act 1872 (35 & 36 Vict c 21).

The Industrial Schools Acts 1866 and 1872 was the collective title of Industrial Schools Act 1866 (29 & 30 Vict. c. 118) and Part II of the Reformatory and Industrial Schools Acts Amendment Act 1872.

The Industrial Schools Acts 1866 and 1894 was the collective title of the Industrial Schools Act 1866 and the Industrial Schools Acts Amendment Act 1894 (57 & 58 Vict. c. 33).

In the construction of the Reformatory and Industrial Schools (Manx Children) Act 1884 (47 & 48 Vict. c. 40), the expression "The Industrial Schools Acts" meant the Industrial Schools Act 1866 and the Industrial Schools Acts Amendment Act 1880 (43 & 44 Vict. c. 15). The Prevention of Cruelty to Children (Amendment) Act 1894 (57 & 58 Vict. c. 27) provided that "unless the context otherwise requires ... The expression "The Industrial Schools Acts" shall mean - (a) as regards England and Scotland, the Industrial Schools Act 1866, and the Acts amending the same; and (b) as regards Ireland, the Industrial Schools Act (Ireland) 1868, and any Act amending the same."

The School Sites Acts is the collective title of the following Acts:

- The School Sites Act 1841 (4 & 5 Vict. c. 38)
- The School Sites Act 1844 (7 & 8 Vict. c. 37)
- The School Sites Act 1849 (12 & 13 Vict. c. 49)
- The School Sites Act 1851 (14 & 15 Vict. c. 24)
- The School Sites Act 1852 (15 & 16 Vict. c. 49)

== See also ==
- List of short titles
