= Births and Deaths Registration Act =

Stock short title used for legislation

Births and Deaths Registration Act (with its variations) is a stock short title used for legislation in Malaysia, New Zealand, the Republic of Ireland and the United Kingdom relating to the registration of births and deaths. The Bill for an Act with this short title will usually have been known as a Births and Deaths Registration Bill during its passage through Parliament.

Births and Deaths Registration Acts may be a generic name either for legislation bearing that short title or for all legislation which relates to the registration of births and deaths.

== List ==
=== Malaysia ===
- The Births and Deaths Registration Act 1957

=== New Zealand ===
- The Registration of Births and Deaths Act 1875 (39 Vict No 23)
- The Registration of Births and Deaths Act Amendment Act 1882 (46 Vict No 67)
- The Registration of Births Extension Act 1884 (48 Vict No 9)
- The Registration of Births Extension Act 1889
- The Registration of Births and Deaths Amendment Act 1892
- The Registration of Births Extension Act 1901 (1 Edw 7 No 57)
- The Registration of Births Extension Act 1906 (6 Edw 7 No 4)
- The Births and Deaths Registration Amendment Act 1912 (3 Geo 5 No 18)
- The Births and Deaths Registration Amendment Act 1915 (6 Geo 5 No 56)
- The Births and Deaths Registration Amendment Act 1920 (11 Geo 5 No 69)
- The Births and Deaths Registration Act 1924 (15 Geo 5 No 13)
- The Births and Deaths Registration Amendment Act 1930 (21 Geo 5 No 19)
- The Births and Deaths Registration Amendment Act 1947 (11 Geo 6 No 12)
- The Births and Deaths Registration Act 1951 (No 22)
- The Births and Deaths Registration Amendment Act 1953 (No 81)
- The Births and Deaths Registration Amendment Act 1955 (No 30)
- The Births and Deaths Registration Amendment Act 1959 (No 25)
- The Births and Deaths Registration Amendment Act 1961 (No 23)
- The Births and Deaths Registration Amendment Act 1963 (No 76)
- The Births and Deaths Registration Amendment Act 1964 (No 79)
- The Births and Deaths Registration Amendment Act 1969 (No 68)
- The Births and Deaths Registration Amendment Act 1970 (No 48)
- The Births and Deaths Registration Amendment Act 1972 (No 49)
- The Births and Deaths Registration Amendment Act 1976 (No 76)
- The Births and Deaths Registration Amendment Act 1982 (No 61)
- The Births and Deaths Registration Amendment Act 1991 (No 127)
- The Births and Deaths Registration Amendment Act 1993 (No 29)
- The Births, Deaths, and Marriages Registration Act 1995 (No 16)
- The Births, Deaths, and Marriages Registration Amendment Act 1997 (No 35)
- The Births, Deaths, and Marriages Registration Amendment Act 2000 (No 54)
- The Births, Deaths, and Marriages Registration Amendment Act 2001 (No 56)
- The Births, Deaths, and Marriages Registration Amendment Act 2002 (No 59)
- The Births, Deaths, and Marriages Registration Amendment Act 2003 (No 61)

=== Republic of Ireland ===
- The Registration of Births and Deaths Act 1936
- The Vital Statistics and Births, Deaths and Marriages Registration Act 1952
- The Births, Deaths and Marriages Registration Act 1972
- The Registration of Births Act 1996

=== United Kingdom ===
- The Registration of Births, Deaths and Marriages (Army) Act 1879 (42 & 43 Vict. c. 8)
- The Burial and Registration Acts (Doubts Removal) Act 1881 (44 & 45 Vict. c. 2)
- The Births and Deaths Registration Act 1926 (16 & 17 Geo. 5. c. 48)
- The Births and Deaths Registration Act 1947 (10 & 11 Geo. 6. c. 12)
- The Births and Deaths Registration Act 1953 (1 & 2 Eliz. 2. c. 20)
- The Registration of Births, Deaths and Marriages (Special Provisions) Act 1957 (5 & 6 Eliz. 2. c. 58)

The Births and Deaths Registration Acts 1836 to 1874 is the collective title of the following Acts:

- The Births and Deaths Registration Act 1836 (6 & 7 Will. 4. c. 86)
- The Births and Deaths Registration Act 1837 (7 Will. 4 & 1 Vict. c. 22)
- The Births and Deaths Registration Act 1858 (21 & 22 Vict. c. 25)
- The Births and Deaths Registration Act 1874 (37 & 38 Vict. c. 38)

Scotland

- The Registration of Births, Deaths and Marriages (Scotland) Amendment Act 1910 (10 Edw. 7. & 1 Geo. 5. c. 32)
- The Registration of Births, Deaths and Marriages (Scotland) Amendment Act 1934 (24 & 25 Geo. 5. c. 19)
- The Registration of Still-Births (Scotland) Act 1938 (1 & 2 Geo. 6. c. 55)
- The Registration of Births, Deaths and Marriages (Scotland) Act 1965 (c. 49)

The Births, Deaths, and Marriages (Scotland) Acts 1854 to 1860 was the collective title of the following Acts:

- The Registration of Births, Deaths, and Marriages (Scotland) Act 1854 (17 & 18 Vict. c. 80)
- The Registration of Births, Deaths, and Marriages (Scotland) Act 1855 (18 & 19 Vict. c. 89)
- The Registration of Births, Deaths, and Marriages (Scotland) Act 1860 (23 & 24 Vict. c. 85)

Ireland

The Births and Deaths Registration (Ireland) Acts 1863 to 1880 was the collective title of the following Acts:

- The Registration of Births and Deaths (Ireland) Act (26 & 27 Vict. c. 11)
- The Births and Deaths Registration Act (Ireland) 1880 (43 & 44 Vict. c. 13)

=== India ===
- The Registration of Births and Deaths Act, 1969

== See also ==
- List of short titles
