= Parliamentary Costs Act 2006 =

Act of the Parliament of the United Kingdom

Parliamentary Costs Act 2006 (Note: Section 19(3).)
- Act of Parliament
- Parliament of the United Kingdom
- Long title: An Act to consolidate the House of Commons Costs Taxation Act 1847, the House of Lords Costs Taxation Act 1849, the Parliamentary Costs Act 1865, the Parliamentary Costs Act 1867, the Parliamentary Costs Act 1871 and the House of Commons Costs Taxation Act 1879, with amendments to give effect to recommendations of the Law Commission and the Scottish Law Commission.
- Citation: 2006 c. 37
- Territorial extent: United Kingdom (Note: Section 19(2).)

Dates
- Royal assent: 8 November 2006
- Commencement: 1 April 2007 (Note: Section 19(1).)
Other legislation
Amends	Private Legislation Procedure (Scotland) Act 1936; Statutory Orders (Special Procedure) Act 1945; See § Repealed enactments
Repeals/revokes	See § Repealed enactments

Status: Current legislation

History of passage through Parliament

Text of statute as originally enacted

Revised text of statute as amended

The Parliamentary Costs Act 2006 (c. 37) is an act of the Parliament of the United Kingdom. It consolidates legislation relating to parliamentary costs of private bills.

== Provisions ==
The act concerns the "assessment and certification" of costs that are incurred during the passage of a private bill by the promoters of the bill, opponents of the bill, and other parties. The contents of the act also apply to hybrid bills.

The Speaker of the House of Commons is required to appoint a taxing officer under the act.

The act was passed as a consolidation bill, replacing various other laws, including:

- the House of Commons Costs Taxation Act 1847
- the House of Lords Costs Taxation Act 1849
- the Parliamentary Costs Act 1865
- the Parliamentary Costs Act 1867
- the Parliamentary Costs Act 1871
- the House of Commons Costs Taxation Act 1879

=== Repealed enactments and revocations ===
Section 17(6) of the act repealed 7 enactments and revoked 1 instrument, listed in schedule 1 to the act.

Citation	Short title	Extent of repeal or revocation
Acts
10 & 11 Vict. c. 69	House of Commons Costs Taxation Act 1847	The whole act.
12 & 13 Vict. c. 78	House of Lords Costs Taxation Act 1849	The whole act.
28 & 29 Vict. c. 27	Parliamentary Costs Act 1865	The whole act.
30 & 31 Vict. c. 136	Parliamentary Costs Act 1867	The whole act.
34 & 35 Vict. c. 3	Parliamentary Costs Act 1871	The whole act.
42 & 43 Vict. c. 17	House of Commons Costs Taxation Act 1879	The whole act.
1993 c. 50	Statute Law (Repeals) Act 1993	In Schedule 2, paragraph 13.
Statutory instruments
SI 1991/2684	Solicitors' Incorporated Practices Order 1991	In Schedule 1, the entries relating to the House of Commons Costs Taxation Act 1847, the House of Lords Costs Taxation Act 1849, the Parliamentary Costs Act 1865, and the House of Commons Costs Taxation Act 1879.
SI 1991/2684	Solicitors' Incorporated Practices Order 1991	In Schedule 2, the entry relating to the House of Lords Costs Taxation Act 1849.

== See also ==
- Parliamentary Costs Act
