= Short Titles Act 1892 =

Act of the Parliament of the United Kingdom

Short Titles Act 1892 (Note: Section 2.)
- Act of Parliament
- Parliament of the United Kingdom
- Long title: An Act to facilitate the Citation of sundry Acts of Parliament.
- Citation: 55 & 56 Vict. c. 10
- Introduced by: The Lord Chancellor (Lords)
- Territorial extent: United Kingdom

Dates
- Royal assent: 20 May 1892
- Commencement: 20 May 1892 (Note: The Acts of Parliament (Commencement) Act 1793.)
- Repealed: 20 July 1896
Other legislation
Repealed by	Short Titles Act 1896

Status: Repealed

Text of statute as originally enacted

The Short Titles Act 1892 (55 & 56 Vict. c. 10) was an act of the Parliament of the United Kingdom. It authorised the citation of earlier acts by short titles and collective titles. It was replaced by the Short Titles Act 1896 (59 & 60 Vict. c. 14).

The act conferred short titles on 851 acts which were passed between 1351 and 1881. The earliest of these acts was the Treason Act 1351 (25 Edw. 3 Stat. 5. c. 2) and the most recent was the Post Office (Newspaper) Act 1881.

The bill for this act was described as "a very useful measure". Courtenay Ilbert said that the act proved useful both by facilitating reference to statutes and by reducing the length and cost of legal documents that involved references to statutes. Herbert Percival said that the short titles authorised by this act were convenient.

As to the effect of this act on the Betting Act 1853 (16 & 17 Vict. c. 119), see Powell v Kempton Park Racecourse. As to the short title of the Legacy Duty Act 1796 (36 Geo. 3. c. 52), see Scott v Scott. As to the use of the expression "income tax" by this act, see London County Council v Attorney General.

== See also ==
- Short Titles Act

== Bibliography ==
- The Public General Acts passed in the fifty-fifth and fifty-sixth years of the reign of Her Majesty Queen Victoria. HMSO. London. 1892. Pages 12 to 118.
- HL Deb vol 1, cols 413, 1463 and 1464 and 1760, vol 2, cols 265, 456 and 608, vol 4, col 339 and 485, HC Deb vol 2, col 1303, vol 3, cols 138, 1275 to 1277, 1718 to 1720 and 1865.
- John Mounteney Lely. "Short Titles Act, 1892". The Statutes of Practical Utility. (Chitty's Statutes). Fifth Edition. Sweet and Maxwell. Stevens and Sons. London. 1894. Volume 1. Title "Act of Parliament". Pages 21 to 31.
- John Mounteney Lely. "Short Titles Act, 1892". Statutes of Practical Utility Passed in the Session of 1892 ending in June. (Continuation of Chitty's Statutes). Sweet and Maxwell. Stevens and Sons. London. August 1892. Pages 295 to 383. See also page iii.
- James Sutherland Cotton (ed). "Short Titles Act, 1892". The Practical Statutes of the Session 1892. (Paterson's Practical Statutes). Horace Cox. Windsor House, Bream's Buildings, London. 1892. Pages 15 to 101.
- "Obiter Dicta" (1892) 27 The Law Journal 229 at 230 and 375. See also pages 164, 224, 300, 320, 346, 351, 415, and 689; and 28 The Law Journal 291
- "A Reading of the New Statutes" (1892) 36 Solicitors Journal 786
- "Current Topics" (1892) 36 Solicitors Journal 302
- (1914) 58 Solicitors Journal 550 (23 May 1914); (1932) 76 Solicitors Journal 534 (30 July 1932)
- James Roberts, "Statute Law Revision" (1892) 94 The Law Times 18; (1892) 27 The Law Journal 705
- "Short Titles Act, 1892" (1892) 11 The Law Notes 296
- Thwaites, "Students' Statutes" (1892) 14 The Law Students' Journal 209 at 210 (1 September)
- 165 The Law Times 167 (25 February 1928)
