= John Hobson =

John Hobson may refer to:

- John A. Hobson (1858–1940), English economist and imperial critic
- John M. Hobson (b. 1962), author of The Eastern Origins of Western Civilisation
- John Hobson (politician) (1912–1967), British Conservative Member of Parliament and Attorney-General
