= Collective title =

A collective title is an expression by which two or more pieces of legislation may, under the law of the United Kingdom, be cited together. An example is the Parliament Acts 1911 and 1949.

In Irish law, the term collective citation is used.

== Construction of references to citation with a group of Acts that have a collective title ==
Section 2(2) of the Short Titles Act 1896 reads:

If it is provided that any Act passed after this Act may, as to the whole or any part thereof, be cited with any of the groups of Acts mentioned in the Second Schedule to this Act, or with any group of Acts to which a collective title has been given by any Act passed before this Act, that group shall be construed as including that Act or part, and, if the collective title of the group states the first and last years of the group, the year in which that Act is passed shall be substituted for the last year of the group, and so on as often as a subsequent Act or part is added to the group.

This provision is derived from section 1(3) of the Short Titles Act 1892.

== Effect of repeal ==
Section 19(2) of the Interpretation Act 1978 does not authorise the continued use of a collective title previously authorised by a repealed enactment.

== See also ==
- Short title
