= Short and long titles =

Naming conventions for legislative or government acts

In certain jurisdictions, including the United Kingdom and other Westminster-influenced jurisdictions (such as Canada or Australia), as well as the United States and the Philippines, primary legislation has both a short title and a long title.

The long title (properly, the title in some jurisdictions) is the formal title appearing at the head of a statute (such as an act of Parliament or of Congress) or other legislative instrument. The long title is intended to provide a summarised description of the purpose or scope of the instrument. Like other descriptive components of an act (such as the preamble, section headings, side notes, and short title), the long title seldom affects the operative provisions of an act, except where the operative provisions are unclear or ambiguous and the long title provides a clear statement of the legislature's intention.

The short title is the formal name by which legislation may by law be cited. It contrasts with the long title which, while usually being more fully descriptive of the legislation's purpose and effects, is generally too unwieldy for most uses. For example, the short title House of Lords Act 1999 contrasts with the long title An Act to restrict membership of the House of Lords by virtue of a hereditary peerage; to make related provision about disqualifications for voting at elections to, and for membership of, the House of Commons; and for connected purposes.

== Significance ==
=== Long titles ===
In the United Kingdom, the long title is important since, under the procedures of Parliament, a bill cannot be amended to go outside the scope of its long title. For that reason, modern long titles tend to be rather vague, ending with the formulation "and for connected purposes". The long title of an older act is sometimes termed its rubric, because it was sometimes printed in red.

Short titles for acts of Parliament were not introduced until the mid-19th century, and were not provided for every act passed until late in the century; as such, the long title was used to identify the act. Short titles were subsequently given to many unrepealed acts at later dates; for example, the Bill of Rights, an act of 1689, was given that short title by the Short Titles Act 1896, having until then been formally referred to only by its long title, An Act Declaring the Rights and Liberties of the Subject and Settling the Succession of the Crown. Similarly, in the US, the Judiciary Act of 1789, which was ruled unconstitutional in part by Marbury v. Madison (1803), was called "An Act to establish the Judicial Courts of the United States".

The long title was traditionally followed by the preamble, an optional part of an act setting out a number of preliminary statements of facts similar to recitals, each starting Whereas...

=== Short titles ===
Unlike the long title, which precedes the preamble and enacting formula, and thus sits outside the main body of text, the short title for modern legislation is explicitly defined by a specific section, typically at the very end or very beginning of the main text. As with the above example, short titles are generally made up of just a few words that describe in broad terms the area of law being changed or the thing affected, followed by the word "Act" and then the year in which the legislation is formally enacted. Occasionally, the word "Act" may be replaced with another descriptor. Common examples are "Code" and "Charter".

A notable exception is Israel, in which this convention is reversed. The short title sits outside the main body of legislation, and the summary description of the law, which is made optional, is defined by a specific section if existing. For example, the Combating Iran's Nuclear Program Act, which under the usual convention would have begun with the long title

An Act to sanction entities assisting Iran in promoting its nuclear program or obtaining weapons of mass destruction or means of carrying weapons of mass destruction and to limit corporations who have business relations with Iran, for its favor or in its territory, as part of the international struggle against Iran's nuclear program.

and whose first section might have read

This Act may be cited as the 'Combating Iran's Nuclear Program Act, 5772-2012'.

actually begins with the short title

Combating Iran's Nuclear Program Act, 5772-2012

and its first section reads

The purpose of this Act is to sanction entities assisting Iran in promoting its nuclear program or obtaining weapons of mass destruction or means of carrying weapons of mass destruction and to limit corporations who have business relations with Iran, for its favor or in its territory, as part of the international struggle against Iran's nuclear program.

The Australian state of Victoria, since 1986, follows a similar practice, having a title comparable to a short title outside the main body of the legislation and a purpose section establishing the purpose of the legislation. Bills continue to have long titles (in similar terms to the purpose section) so that the scoping rules described in the previous section continue to apply, but are removed and noted in the endnotes upon enactment.

The titles of legislation enacted by the United States Congress, if they include a year, invariably add the preposition "of" between the word "Act" and the year. Compare the Australian Disability Discrimination Act 1992 (Cth), Disability Discrimination Act 1995 (UK), and Americans with Disabilities Act of 1990 (US). Even if no year was included in the official short title enacted by Congress, it is traditional always to precede the year with an "of" if it needs to be appended in prose after the short title. This convention is followed by most but not all U.S. states; for example, the Act of the Pennsylvania legislature that consolidated the governments of the city of Philadelphia and Philadelphia County is generally (though not formally) called the Act of Consolidation, 1854. The vast majority of acts passed by the Parliament of Canada do not include the year of enactment as part of the short title. In acts passed by the Congress of the Philippines, titling of legislation primarily follows the U.S. convention, although many acts contain the word "Law" instead of the more conventional "Act" either at the end of the title or before "of [year]" if they are comprehensive.

Since the early 20th century, it has become popular in the United States to include the names of key legislators in the short titles of the most important acts. This was at first done informally; that is, the names appeared in legal treatises and court opinions but were not part of the statute as enacted. Eventually members of Congress began to formally write their own names into short titles (thereby immortalizing themselves for posterity), as in the Hart–Scott–Rodino Antitrust Improvements Act and the Dodd–Frank Wall Street Reform and Consumer Protection Act. In some states, like California, some short titles consist only of the names of the key legislators, as in the Lanterman–Petris–Short Act, the statutory basis of the "5150" involuntary psychiatric hold used for temporarily detaining psychiatric patients.

Draft legislation (bills) also uses short titles, but substitutes the word "Bill" for "Act".

== Style ==
=== Definite article ===
The Australian Guide to Legal Citation recommends that the definite article at the beginning of the "statute title" should be omitted when citing a statute of the United Kingdom.

=== Comma ===
Originally short titles had a comma preceding the year. Whether this is retained or not depends on the country involved: it has been dropped in Ireland and the United Kingdom, but retained in Canada.

==== Ireland ====
In citing an act by its short title, a comma immediately before a reference to a year and a comma immediately after such a reference that is not required for the purpose of punctuation may be omitted.

==== United Kingdom ====
It is not necessary to use the comma as it is not part of an act of Parliament; although normal punctuation is now used by draftsmen, and is included in King's Printer's copies of acts of Parliament.

The comma preceding the calendar year in printed copies of acts is omitted on the authority of a note by Sir Noel Hutton QC, First Parliamentary Counsel, as to which see "The Citation of Statutes" 82 LQR 24-24. The validity of this note is questioned by Halsbury's Laws of England, Fourth Edition, Reissue, Volume 44(1), footnote 10 to paragraph 1268.

Glanville Williams said that it "seems sensible" to omit the comma preceding the calendar year in references to acts passed before 1963.

==== United States ====
An act of Congress that appropriates federal funds to specific federal government departments, agencies and programs has a comma rather than of between "Appropriations Act" and the year of passage, beginning in the 2000s. However, a 1990s example of this titling pattern is the Omnibus Consolidated and Emergency Appropriations Act, 1999.

== Interpretation ==
In Re Boaler, Buckley LJ said:

The fact that for the purpose of identification only and not of enactment also authority is given to identify the statute by a particular name in which the word "action" occurs is, I think, immaterial. The words "This Act may be cited as the Vexatious Actions Act 1896," effect nothing by way of enactment. They do no more than create a name, and whether it is as matter of description accurate or not is immaterial. In support of this view I refer to that which Lord Haldane said in Vacher & Sons v. London Society of Compositors(2) as regards the title "Trade Disputes Act, 1906," and that which Lord Moulton said in the same case(3), and to that which the latter said further in National Telephone Co. v. Postmaster-General.(4)

(2) [1913] A. C. at p. 114.
(3) [1913] A. C. at p. 128.
(4) [1913] A. C. 546, at p. 560.

In R v Wheatley, Bridge LJ said of the Explosives Act 1875 and the Explosive Substances Act 1883:

Looking at the two statutes, at the nature of the provisions which they both contain, and in particular at the short and long titles of both statutes, it appears to this court that they are clearly in pari materia, ...

If much of an older act was repealed by the time a short title was assigned to it, the short title may describe only the parts in force at the time of assignment. For example, the act 59 George III c.84 as enacted regulated publicly funded roadbuilding throughout Ireland, but by 1873 the only unrepealed section was one making Kinsale a barony, so the 1896 short title is "Kinsale Act 1819".

=== Effect of repeal ===
==== Ireland ====
Notwithstanding the repeal of an enactment giving a short title to an act, the act may, without prejudice to any other mode of citation, continue to be cited by that short title.

==== United Kingdom ====
An act may continue to be cited by the short title authorised by any enactment notwithstanding the repeal of that enactment.

19 Citation of other Acts.

[...]

(2) An Act may continue to be cited by the short title authorised by any enactment notwithstanding the repeal of that enactment. — Interpretation Act 1978

== History ==
Since the second half of the nineteenth century, short titles have become the usual method of referencing earlier statute law within legislation itself. In the UK this replaced the earlier method of citing the long title together with the chapter number and the regnal year(s) of the parliamentary session in which it received royal assent. For example, modern legislation would simply refer to "the Evidence Act 1845", whereas in the past it would have been necessary to use wording such as "the Act passed in the eighth and ninth year of Her Majesty's reign chapter one hundred and thirteen intitled 'An Act to facilitate the Admission in Evidence of certain official and other Documents'".

Short titles were introduced because the titles of statutes (now commonly known as long titles) had become so long that they were no longer a useful means of citation. For example, the title of 19 Geo. 2. c. 26 (1745) (Attainder of Earl of Kellie and others Act 1746) ran to 65 lines of King's Printer and to over 400 words.

Short titles were first introduced for acts of Parliament in the 1840s. Amending acts also began to take the opportunity to create short titles for earlier acts as well as for themselves. Eventually the Short Titles Act 1892 (55 & 56 Vict. c. 10) was passed to create short titles for almost all remaining legislation. This statute was repealed and replaced by the Short Titles Act 1896, which conferred short titles on about 2,000 acts. The Short Titles Act (Northern Ireland) 1951 conferred short titles on 179 acts applying to Northern Ireland. The Statute Law Revision (Scotland) Act 1964 conferred short titles on 164 pre-union acts of the Parliament of Scotland. Further short titles were given by the Statute Law Revision Act 1948, the Statute Law (Repeals) Act 1977 and the Statute Law (Repeals) Act 1978.

In Ireland, ex post facto short titles have been conferred by the Short Titles Act 1962, the Statute Law Revision Act 2007, the Statute Law Revision Act 2009 and the Statute Law Revision Act 2012.

=== Name changes ===
In a few cases, particular acts have had more than one short title given to them, for example because subsequent amendments to their contents have rendered the earlier name inaccurate. For example, when the 1992 version of Basic Law: the Government – the so-called "Direct Election law" – made the post of Prime Minister of Israel elected, it added provisions regarding the Prime Ministerial election to the Knesset Election Law, 1969, and renamed it as "Knesset and Prime Minister Elections Law, 1969". This change was reverted following the abolition of direct Prime Ministerial elections in 2001.

British (and English) legislation that has been "inherited" by the legal systems of other countries has also sometimes ended up with a short title in one jurisdiction that differs from that used in another: for example, the act of Parliament that created Canada in 1867 is formally known in Canada as the Constitution Act, 1867, but is still known as the British North America Act 1867 in British law; note also the differing comma convention. Similarly, the Act "21 & 22 George III c.48" of the Parliament of Ireland is "Yelverton's Act (Ireland) 1781 [I]" in Northern Ireland and "Calendar Act, 1781" in the Republic of Ireland; the short titles were assigned respectively by Acts of the Parliament of Northern Ireland and the Oireachtas.

== Examples of use (by jurisdiction) ==
Most short titles include a descriptive phrase followed by the type of legislation and the year of enactment; for example, the Human Rights Act 1998 is an act of Parliament relating to human rights that received Royal Assent in 1998. Some exceptions exist, such as the Bill of Rights 1689, whose formal short title in the UK (as given by the Short Titles Act 1896) is simply "Bill of Rights", without a year, although it is not a bill but an act.

More narrowly focused legislation may have a secondary phrase in parentheses, such as the Road Traffic (Vehicle Emissions) Regulations 2002 (a statutory instrument).

Laws that relate primarily to other laws, such as amendments, contain the short titles of those laws in their own short titles, for example the Sustainable Communities Act 2007 (Amendment) Act 2010. Subsequent enactments can lead to particularly lengthy short titles; for example, the Artizans' and Labourers' Dwellings Act 1868, amended by the Artizans' and Labourers' Dwellings Act 1868 (Amendment) Act 1869, and itself amended by the Artizans' and Labourers' Dwellings Act 1868 (Amendment) Act 1879 (Amendment) Act 1880. The more recent shorter convention is that an act amending "Foo Act yyy1" will have short title "Foo (Amendment) Act yyy2".

If a law is passed with the same title as another law passed in the same year, an ordinal number will be added to distinguish it from the others; this is particularly common for Finance Acts (Finance (No. 3) Act 2010) and commencement orders that bring parts of an Act into force (Environment Act 1995 (Commencement No.13) (Scotland) Order 1998). However, for laws that amend other laws, this ordinal numbering does not reset every year (For example, even though only two amendments were made to the Israeli Criminal Procedure Law in 2018, these amendments are numbered No.81 and No.82 in their titles.)

In Ireland, the Thirty-First Amendment of the Constitution (Children) Act 2012 was enacted in 2015 rather than 2012. It was passed by both houses of the Oireachtas in 2012 but not signed into law by the President until 2015, after an intervening referendum and court challenge. Section 2(2) of the act, which assigns the short title, could not be amended between the houses' passing the bill and its being enacted (though it could still be amended by a subsequent act of the Oireachtas). This act's short title is longer than its long title, which is "An Act to Amend the Constitution", as required by the constitution.

=== Australia ===
Australian long titles are more like American than British ones in that they are short and broad: for example, "A Bill for an Act to provide for the establishment of the Automotive Transformation Scheme, and for related purposes". However, not all states use long titles and an Act may instead have an explicit "Purpose" section. For example, long titles are abolished for Victorian Acts, although they are still used for parliamentary purposes.

=== European Union ===
Acts in EU law are cited by a combination of letters and numbers, e.g. '(EU) 2015/35' as short titles; but occasionally there are descriptive short titles, e.g. Regulation (EC) No 1234/2007 = 'Single CMO Regulation', the REACH Regulation.

=== Ireland ===
An act may be cited in an enactment or other document by, amongst other things, the short title of the act.

=== New Zealand ===
Long and short titles were used in New Zealand up to and including 1999. From 1 January 2000 they were replaced by a single title.

=== South Africa ===
Long titles in South Africa omit the initial "An".

=== United Kingdom ===
The wording after "An Act" varies somewhat between jurisdictions. In some jurisdictions, including the United Kingdom, the long title opens with the words "An Act to ...". For example, the short title of the House of Lords Act 1999 is House of Lords Act 1999, but its long title is An Act to restrict membership of the House of Lords by virtue of a hereditary peerage; to make related provision about disqualifications for voting at elections to, and for membership of, the House of Commons; and for connected purposes. UK bills substitute the words "A Bill" for "An Act". Thus, before it passed, the long title of the House of Lords Bill 1999 was "A Bill to restrict membership...". Because of the way they are used to define the scope of bills, many British long titles are quite long.

=== United States ===
While the long titles of most acts of the US Congress read, "An Act to...", appropriations bills begin, "An Act making appropriations for...". Bills begin "A Bill for an Act..." Legislation in U.S. states also vary both in the exact wording and the level of detail of long titles. A typical long title in Illinois is, "AN ACT concerning safety", giving only a very broad characterization of the subject matter. On the other hand, a recent New Hampshire law carried the long title, "AN ACT relative to establishing a municipal bond rescission process, authorizing governing bodies to call a special meeting to consider reduction or rescission of appropriations, and clarifying special procedures enabling towns to respond appropriately to the American Recovery and Reinvestment Act of 2009."

== See also ==
- Short Titles Act
- List of short titles
- Collective title

== Bibliography ==
- Halsbury's Laws, Statutes, para. 1264
- Halsbury's Laws of England. Fourth Edition. Reissue. 1995. Volume 44(1). Statutes para. 1253, 1268.
- The Digest: Annotated British, Commonwealth and European Cases. 1997 2nd Reissue. Butterworth & Co (Publishers) Ltd. London. 1997. ISBN 0 406 02500 2 (for the complete set of volumes). Volume 45. ISBN 0 406 999 023 (for this volume). Title: "Statutes". Pages 411 to 414.
- Tobias A Dorsey. Legislative Drafter's Deskbook: A Practical Guide. The Capitol.Net Inc. 2006. ISBN 9781587330155. Pages 224 to 227. Google Books.
