= Northern Pipeline Construction Co. v. Marathon Pipe Line Co. =

Northern Pipeline Construction Company v. Marathon Pipe Line Company
- Supreme Court of the United States

Argued April 27, 1982 Decided June 28, 1982
- Full case name: Northern Pipeline Construction Company v. Marathon Pipe Line Company
- Citations: 458 U.S. 50 (more) 102 S. Ct. 2858; 73 L. Ed. 2d 598; 1982 U.S. LEXIS 143; 50 U.S.L.W. 4892; Bankr. L. Rep. (CCH) ¶ 68,698; 6 Collier Bankr. Cas. 2d (MB) 785; 9 Bankr. Ct. Dec. 67

Case history
- Prior: On appeal from the United States District Court for the District of Minnesota
- Subsequent: None

Holding
- The U.S. Bankruptcy Courts could not exercise the full powers of an Article III court.

Court membership
- Chief Justice Warren E. Burger Associate Justices William J. Brennan Jr. · Byron White; Thurgood Marshall · Harry Blackmun; Lewis F. Powell Jr. · William Rehnquist; John P. Stevens · Sandra Day O'Connor

Case opinions
- Plurality: Brennan, joined by Marshall, Blackmun, Stevens
- Concurrence: Rehnquist (in judgment), joined by O'Connor
- Dissent: Burger
- Dissent: White, joined by Burger, Powell

Laws applied
- U.S. Const., Article III; 28 U.S.C. § 1471

Northern Pipeline Construction Company v. Marathon Pipe Line Company, 458 U.S. 50 (1982), is a United States Supreme Court case in which the Court held that Article III jurisdiction could not be conferred on non-Article III courts (i.e. courts without the independence and protection given to Article III judges).

== Background ==
The Bankruptcy Act of 1978 completely altered bankruptcy law in the United States. It created the Bankruptcy Code (Title 11 of the United States Code), and created bankruptcy courts, which served as adjuncts to the United States District Courts for each federal judicial district of the United States. Under the previous law, the Bankruptcy Act of 1898, the federal district courts served as bankruptcy courts and appointed "referees" to conduct proceedings, so long as the district court chose not to withdraw a case from the referee. The new law eliminated the "referee" system and allowed the President to appoint bankruptcy judges for terms of fourteen years (as opposed to the life tenure given to Article III judges), with the advice and consent of the Senate. The judges’ salaries were set by statute and subject to adjustment, and they could be removed by the judicial council of the circuit on grounds of incompetence, misconduct, neglect of duty, or physical or mental disability (as compared with Article III judges, who may only be impeached by Congress and are constitutionally forbidden from having their pay decreased while in office).

The new Bankruptcy Act granted the bankruptcy courts jurisdiction over all "civil proceedings arising under Title 11 or arising in or related to cases under Title 11". Furthermore, the law endowed the bankruptcy courts with all of the "powers of a court of law or equity", except for issuing injunctions against other courts and punishing criminal contempt outside of court (or otherwise punishable by imprisonment). The law also created a Bankruptcy Appellate Panel for each judicial circuit, which would hear appeals from final orders and judgments of the bankruptcy courts. If no appeals panel was designated, then the district court itself would hear the appeals.

In January 1980, the plaintiff/appellant in this matter, Northern Pipeline Construction Co. (Northern), filed a petition for reorganization under Chapter 11 of the bankruptcy code in the U.S. Bankruptcy Court for the District of Minnesota. Two months later, in March 1980, Northern brought suit in the bankruptcy court against defendant/appellee Marathon Pipe Line Co. (Marathon) for breach of contract and warranty, misrepresentation, coercion, and duress. Marathon moved to dismiss the suit on the grounds that the Bankruptcy Act of 1978 unconstitutionally conferred Article III powers on judges who lacked the career protections and political independence of Article III judges. The United States intervened to protect its own interests.

The bankruptcy judge denied Marathon's motion, but on appeal, the United States District Court for the District of Minnesota reversed, agreeing with Marathon's argument that the law was unconstitutional.

== Opinion of the Court ==
Justice Brennan wrote for the plurality, joined by Justices Marshall, Blackmun, and Stevens. He stressed the importance of the political independence of the judiciary, which allows judges to decide cases free from domination from the Executive and Legislative branches. The life tenure and protection against diminution of salary helps to ensure this independence, but the bankruptcy judges lacked this protection.

Brennan distinguished the bankruptcy courts from three other categories of non-Article III courts. The first two categories of courts Brennan discusses are the territorial courts, permissible because Congress exercises the general powers of government in these territories; and courts martial, permissible because the Constitution grants the political branches broad powers to control the military.

The third exception discussed by Brennan are tribunals for the adjudication of cases involving public rights, matters which arise "between the government and persons subject to its authority in connection with the performance of the constitutional functions of the executive or legislative departments". 458 U.S. at 67-68. Public rights exist in contrast to private rights, i.e. disputes between two private parties, which are within the judicial power of Article III courts.

Brennan held that the dispute in question here was an adjudication of private rights, because it involved the restructuring of creditor-debtor relations under the bankruptcy laws. Thus, none of the three exceptions to Article III jurisdiction were applicable. He further held that Congress’ power under the Naturalization and Bankruptcy Clause (Art. I, § 8, cl.4) of the Constitution did not carry with it a power to create specialized tribunals for the adjudication of bankruptcy cases. Brennan feared that reading such a power into Article I would erode the jurisdiction conferred by Article III and displace the judicial branch of the government.

Brennan then turned to Northern's argument that the bankruptcy courts were merely adjuncts to the U.S. District Courts. He framed the Constitutional issue as the determination whether the Bankruptcy Act retained "the essential attributes of judicial power" inherent in Article III tribunals. He began his analysis by examining two prior cases: Crowell v. Benson, 285 U.S. 22 (1932), in which the court permitted the United States Employees' Compensation Commission to make factual determinations in the issuance of compensation orders for individual employees; and United States v. Raddatz, 447 U.S. 667 (1980), in which the court upheld the Federal Magistrates Act, which permitted district court judges to refer certain pretrial motions to magistrates for initial determination. These cases provided limits on the extent to which Congress may transfer traditionally judicial functions to non-Article III tribunals. For example, Congress has substantial discretion in prescribing the manner in which rights created by its own statutes may be enforced, but Congress has no such discretion in altering the adjudication of rights it has not created by statute. Furthermore, the functions of the adjunct court must be limited in such a way so as to preserve the parties’ rights to adjudication before an Article III court.

Brennan held that the rights to be determined in a bankruptcy proceeding were not Congressionally created rights, and therefore the Bankruptcy Act encroached upon the powers of Article III courts. The rights Northern claimed against Marathon were contractual in nature, and as such were creatures of state law. Moreover, the jurisdiction granted to the bankruptcy courts under the Act was too broad, vesting them jurisdiction over all civil proceedings arising under Title 11 and in related cases, and granting them the power to issue final judgments. Thus, while Congress did retain the power to assign certain matters to non-Article III tribunals, this power was limited to rights created by federal statute and the powers of the tribunal had to be narrower than what an Article III court could exercise.

Finally, Brennan chose to apply the holding only prospectively, and to stay the judgment of the court until October 4, 1982, to give Congress some time to rewrite the statute.

=== Concurrence ===
Justice Rehnquist, joined by Justice O’Connor, concurred in the judgment, on the grounds that Congress could not constitutionally vest bankruptcy courts with such broad authority to adjudicate state law matters related to a bankruptcy case, but not governed by a federal rule of decision. However, because this is an area of law the Court has addressed infrequently, and because this was a narrower constitutional ground upon which to decide the case, Rehnquist would have declined to take as broad a position on the powers of Congress to create such federal courts as the plurality did.

=== Dissenting opinions ===
==== White's dissent ====
Justice White, with whom Chief Justice Burger and Justice Powell joined, dissented. White felt that the plurality was oversimplifying its analysis of Article III and the principle of judicial independence, and that pure textualism and deriving basic rules from past cases was not enough.

First of all, White argued, the statute should not have been declared invalid on its face, but only as applied to Marathon's proceeding. Secondly, bankruptcy almost always involves a combination of federal and state law issues, by the very nature of its proceedings. Since federal courts only rarely hear state law claims, having bankruptcy courts adjudicate these issues really would not intrude on the powers of Article III courts very much. White accused the court of ignoring the complex realities of bankruptcy law in favor of its own theory of separation of powers.

White also felt that the plurality incorrectly defined the Crowell and Raddatz cases as the outer limits of Congressional authority to create non-Article III tribunals, and ignored both prior bankruptcy and administrative law practice. He noted that not only did bankruptcy judges have many of the same powers as the "referees" under the old law, but that District Courts were given greater latitude in judicial review of bankruptcy court decisions than they had when sitting in review of administrative agency actions (see also: Administrative Procedure Act).

White lamented the confused state of the Court's prior jurisprudence in this area, and suggested that instead of attempting to fashion any sort of hard rules about what matters must remain within the cognizance of Article III courts, the court should use a balancing test. Specifically, the Court should examine which Article III values Congress seeks to accommodate or undermine in its legislative scheme, and then weigh this impact against which values Congress hopes to serve by creating Article I courts. In other words, the benefits of a legislative court must be weighed against its effect on separation of powers and judicial independence. White concluded by saying he felt that the Bankruptcy Act of 1978 passed his balancing test.

==== Burger's dissent ====
Chief Justice Burger added his own brief dissenting opinion, first agreeing with Rehnquist's comment about the overbreadth of the plurality opinion, then lamenting the disruption that the majority's decision would cause in forcing Congress to rewrite the law.

== Subsequent developments ==
The Court stayed its judgment until October 4, 1982 to give Congress an opportunity to repair the constitutional flaws in the bankruptcy system. The Court then extended its stay until December 24, 1982 upon the motion of the Solicitor General.

In response to Congress’ failure to act quickly, the Judicial Conference of the United States published an Emergency Interim Rule, which the federal district courts adopted on December 25, 1982. This rule allowed the district courts to refer cases to bankruptcy courts, but allowed them to withdraw the case at any time. The rule also narrowed the definition of "related proceedings" as those that could have proceeded in federal or state court in the absence of a bankruptcy petition. The bankruptcy judges could not enter final orders or judgments on such related proceedings without consent of the parties, but had to submit its findings and conclusions to the district court, which were subject to de novo review.

Finally, Congress dealt with the problem with the Bankruptcy Amendments and Federal Judgeship Act of 1984. Like the Emergency Interim Rule, this statute authorized the federal district courts to refer bankruptcy cases to the bankruptcy courts, but in so called "non-core" proceedings, the bankruptcy court must submit proposed findings of fact and conclusions of law to the district court for de novo review.
