= United States magistrate judge =

Judges appointed to assist at US federal district courts

In United States federal courts, magistrate judges are judges appointed to assist U.S. district court judges in the performance of their duties. Magistrate judges generally oversee the first appearances of criminal defendants in federal court, set bail, and conduct other administrative duties. The position of magistrate judge or magistrate also exists in some unrelated state courts (see below).

Although they serve on federal courts, U.S. magistrate judges are not considered "federal judges" under Article Three of the United States Constitution. They do not have life tenure, and they are not nominated by the President and confirmed by the Senate. Magistrate judges are appointed by a majority vote of the federal district judges of a particular district and serve terms of eight years if full-time, or four years if part-time, and may be reappointed. As of March 2009 there were 517 full-time and 42 part-time authorized magistrate judgeships, as well as one position combining magistrate judge and clerk of court.

== Authority ==
The magistrate judge's seat is not a separate court; the authority that a magistrate judge exercises is the jurisdiction of the district court itself, delegated to the magistrate judge by the district judges of the court under governing statutory authority, local rules of court, or court orders. Rather than fixing the duties of magistrate judges nationwide, the Federal Magistrates Act allows each district court to assign duties to the magistrate judges as fits the needs of that court.

In criminal proceedings, magistrate judges preside over misdemeanor and petty offense cases, and as to all criminal cases (felony and misdemeanor) may issue search warrants, arrest warrants, and summonses, accept criminal complaints, conduct initial appearance proceedings and detention hearings, set bail or other conditions of release or detention, hold preliminary hearings and examinations, administer oaths, conduct extradition proceedings, and conduct evidentiary hearings on motions to suppress evidence in felony cases for issuance of reports and recommendations to the district judge.

The Supreme Court has held in Peretz v. United States that magistrate judges may supervise the jury selection in a felony trial unless a party objects.

In civil proceedings, magistrate judges typically manage discovery and other pretrial matters. They are authorized to issue orders in pretrial matters as long as the order is not dispositive of the case as a whole (for example, an order granting summary judgment is not within their purview). They may also be assigned to write reports and recommendations to the district judge as to dispositive matters. With the consent of the parties, they may adjudicate civil cases in the same manner as a district judge, including presiding over jury or non-jury trials.

== Assignment ==
Normally, a newly filed federal action is assigned by the clerk of the district court to a district judge and a magistrate judge (whose initials are then appended to the case number in most districts). In some districts, magistrate judges are assigned to work with certain district judges, although they may not do so on all categories of cases. In other districts, magistrate judges are randomly assigned to cases. The clerk runs a random selection procedure (in some courts, spinning a wheel) based on a list of all available district judges and then runs the same procedure based on a list of all available magistrate judges.

In a few districts, starting with the District of Oregon in 1984, magistrate judges participate together with district judges on a unified list of judges available for new cases. A newly filed case can then be assigned to a magistrate judge for all purposes, subject to the ability of any party in the action to affirmatively decline consent to that procedure within a certain time period. Filing of such a declination causes the magistrate judge to return the case to the court clerk for a standard assignment to a district-magistrate pair.

== Review by an Article III tribunal ==
Because Article III of the United States Constitution vests the judicial powers in courts to which the judges are appointed for life (and which are therefore called Article III tribunals), decisions of a magistrate judge are subject to review and either approval, modification or reversal by a district judge of that court – except in civil cases where the parties consent in advance to allow the magistrate judge to exercise the jurisdiction of the district judge, and in which case appeals from the decision of the magistrate judge are heard by the United States courts of appeals. Magistrate judges therefore operate under the authority of United States Congress to appoint "inferior courts", set forth in Article I, making them Article I judges.

The Supreme Court most thoroughly delineated the permissible scope of Article I tribunals in Northern Pipeline Construction Co. v. Marathon Pipe Line Co., striking down the statute that created the original U.S. bankruptcy court. The Court held in that opinion that the framers of the Constitution had developed a scheme of separation of powers which clearly required that the judicial branch be kept independent of the other two branches via the mechanism of lifetime appointments. However, the Court also found that Congress has the power under Article I to create adjunct tribunals, so long as the "essential attributes of judicial power" stay in Article III courts. This power derives from two sources. First, when Congress creates rights, it can require those asserting such rights to go through an Article I tribunal. Second, Congress can create non-Article III tribunals to help Article III courts deal with their workload, but only if the Article I tribunals are under the control of the Article III courts. The magistrate judges fall within this category of "adjunct" tribunals. All actions heard in an Article I tribunal are subject to de novo review in the supervising Article III court, which retains the exclusive power to make and enforce final judgments.

The Supreme Court later stated, in Commodity Futures Trading Commission v. Schor, that parties to litigation could voluntarily waive their right to an Article III tribunal, and thereby submit themselves to a binding judgment from an Article I tribunal.

== History ==
The office of United States magistrate judge was established by the Federal Magistrates Act of 1968. Its foundation is the United States commissioner system, established in 1793. Commissioners were previously used in federal courts to try petty offense cases committed on federal property, to issue search warrants and arrest warrants, to determine bail for federal defendants and to conduct other initial proceedings in federal criminal cases. The Federal Magistrates Act of 1968, as amended, was enacted by the Congress to create a new federal judicial officer who would (1) assume all the former duties of the commissioners and (2) conduct a wide range of judicial proceedings to expedite the disposition of the civil and criminal caseloads of the United States district courts.

In 1979, Congress expanded federal magistrates' authority to include all misdemeanors recognized by the federal criminal code. Magistrates' titles changed again in 1990, when they became "magistrate judges," symbolizing the ever-increasing importance of their work. One view is that the system has worked relatively well in the last 30 years, and has tended to shift the federal courts' caseload to the desired balance. Other legal observers have criticized the increasing powers of magistrate judges, who are neither appointed by the President nor confirmed by the Senate. On the other hand, the selection of a magistrate judge is a merit-based process which, by statute, requires public notice of a vacancy and the appointment of a merit selection panel which includes both lawyers and at least two non-lawyers. The panel is required to consider the attributes of each candidate, including scholarship, experience, knowledge of the court system, and personal attributes such as intelligence, honesty and morality, maturity, demeanor, temperament, and ability to work with others. Applicants for the post must be personally interviewed and recommended for the position. Magistrate judges are compensated at a slightly lower scale than district judges and do not benefit from the full array of benefits accorded to district judges, so increased magistrate judge involvement in judicial matters has a cost-savings effect for the federal courts.

== State courts ==
A number of states have judges titled as magistrates. These positions are unrelated to the federal office, and function according to the laws of the specific state.
