= List of United States presidential vetoes =

In the United States, the term "veto" is used to describe an action by which the president prevents an act passed by Congress from becoming law. This article provides a summary and details of the bills vetoed by presidents.

== Veto procedure ==
Although the term "veto" does not appear in the United States Constitution, Article I requires each bill and joint resolution (except joint resolutions proposing a constitutional amendment) approved by the Congress to be presented to the president for his approval. Once the bill is presented to the president, there are several scenarios which may play out:

- The president may sign the bill into law within ten days (excluding Sundays).
- The president may veto the bill by returning it to Congress with a statement of objections within ten days (excluding Sundays). If the president vetoes a bill, the Congress shall reconsider it (together with the president's objections), and if both houses of the Congress vote to pass the law again by a two-thirds majority of members voting, then the bill becomes law, notwithstanding the president's veto. (The term "override" is used to describe this process of overcoming a presidential veto.)
- If the president does nothing with the bill (neither signing it nor returning it to Congress with objections) and Congress does not by its adjournment prevent the bill's return, then the bill becomes law after ten days (excluding Sundays).
- If the president does nothing with the bill and before the tenth day (excluding Sundays) Congress has adjourned in such a way as to prevent the bill being returned, then the bill expires and does not become law. The term "pocket veto" is used to describe this practice. Pocket vetoes cannot be overridden, so if the Congress still wants the piece of legislation enacted, a new bill must be introduced and passed (at which point it would again be subject to a veto). Doubt has existed as to which recesses and adjournments allow for pocket vetoes. In the modern practice, the clerk of the House and the secretary of the Senate are authorized to receive veto messages during both intrasession and intersession recesses and adjournments, so pocket vetoes are only possible after the adjournment sine die of the final session of a Congress.

Although each case is different, one general rule can be acknowledged: presidents use their prerogative to veto legislation when such legislation does not represent their viewpoint or agenda.

Occasionally, a president either publicly or privately threatens Congress with a veto to influence the content or passage of legislation. There is no record of what constitutes a "veto threat" or how many have been made over the years, but it has become a staple of presidential politics and a sometimes effective way of shaping policy. A president may also warn Congress of a veto of a particular bill so as to persuade Congress not to waste time passing particular legislation or including certain provisions in a bill when the president is prepared to veto it.

== Summary ==
#	President	Regular vetoes	Pocket vetoes	Total vetoes	Vetoes overridden	% of total vetoes overridden	% of regular vetoes overridden
1	George Washington	2	0	2	0	0%	0%
2	John Adams	0	0	0	0	–	–
3	Thomas Jefferson	0	0	0	0	–	–
4	James Madison	5	2	7	0	0%	0%
5	James Monroe	1	0	1	0	0%	0%
6	John Q. Adams	0	0	0	0	–	–
7	Andrew Jackson	5	7	12	0	0%	0%
8	Martin Van Buren	0	1	1	0	0%	0%
9	William Henry Harrison	0	0	0	0	–	–
10	John Tyler	6	4	10	1	10%	16%
11	James Polk	2	1	3	0	0%	0%
12	Zachary Taylor	0	0	0	0	–	–
13	Millard Fillmore	0	0	0	0	–	–
14	Franklin Pierce	9	0	9	5	56%	56%
15	James Buchanan	4	3	7	0	0%	0%
16	Abraham Lincoln	2	5	7	0	0%	0%
17	Andrew Johnson	21	8	29	15	52%	71%
18	Ulysses S. Grant	45	48	93	4	4%	9%
19	Rutherford B. Hayes	12	1	13	1	8%	8%
20	James A. Garfield	0	0	0	0	–	–
21	Chester A. Arthur	4	8	12	1	8%	25%
22	Grover Cleveland	304	110	414	2	1%	1%
23	Benjamin Harrison	19	25	44	1	2%	5%
24	Grover Cleveland	42	128	170	5	3%	12%
25	William McKinley	6	36	42	0	0%	0%
26	Theodore Roosevelt	42	40	82	1	1%	2%
27	William H. Taft	30	9	39	1	3%	3%
28	Woodrow Wilson	33	11	44	6	14%	18%
29	Warren G. Harding	5	1	6	0	0%	0%
30	Calvin Coolidge	20	30	50	4	8%	20%
31	Herbert Hoover	21	16	37	3	8%	14%
32	Franklin D. Roosevelt	372	263	635	9	1%	2%
33	Harry S. Truman	180	70	250	12	5%	7%
34	Dwight D. Eisenhower	73	108	181	2	1%	3%
35	John F. Kennedy	12	9	21	0	0%	0%
36	Lyndon B. Johnson	16	14	30	0	0%	0%
37	Richard Nixon	26	17	43	7	16%	27%
38	Gerald Ford	48	18	66	12	18%	25%
39	Jimmy Carter	13	18	31	2	6%	15%
40	Ronald Reagan	39	39	78	9	12%	23%
41	George H. W. Bush	29	15	44	1	2%	2%
42	Bill Clinton	36	1	37	2	5%	6%
43	George W. Bush	12	0	12	4	33%	33%
44	Barack Obama	12	0	12	1	8%	8%
45	Donald Trump	10	0	10	1	10%	10%
46	Joe Biden	13	0	13	0	0%	0%
47	Donald Trump	2	0	2	0	–	–
	Total	1531	1066	2597	112	4%	7%
	'–' indicates no vetoes to override, so a percentage cannot be calculated						

== Presidents with most or fewest vetoes ==
Record	President	Count	Notes
Most vetoes	Franklin D. Roosevelt	635	Only president to serve more than two terms.
Fewest vetoes	John Adams	0	
Fewest vetoes	Thomas Jefferson	0	
Fewest vetoes	John Quincy Adams	0	
Fewest vetoes	William Henry Harrison	0	Died one month after taking office.
Fewest vetoes	Zachary Taylor	0	Died 16 months after taking office.
Fewest vetoes	Millard Fillmore	0	
Fewest vetoes	James A. Garfield	0	Assassinated roughly six months after taking office.
Most vetoes in a single complete term	Grover Cleveland	414	First term
Most vetoes in two complete terms	Grover Cleveland	584	
Fewest vetoes in a single complete term	John Adams	0	
Fewest vetoes in a single complete term	Thomas Jefferson	0	Each term
Fewest vetoes in a single complete term	James Monroe	0	First term
Fewest vetoes in a single complete term	John Quincy Adams	0	
Fewest vetoes in a single complete term	George W. Bush	0	First term
Fewest vetoes in two complete terms	Thomas Jefferson	0	
Most vetoes in a single Congressional session	Grover Cleveland	212	50th United States Congress
Most vetoes overridden	Andrew Johnson	15	

== Full veto record ==
The following is an incomplete list of the dates and bills of each veto for each president:

=== George Washington ===
Two regular vetoes.

1. April 5, 1792: Vetoed H.R. 163, an act for an apportionment of Representatives among the several states, according to the first enumeration. Override attempt failed in House on April 6, 1792, 28–33 (41 votes needed).
2. February 28, 1797: Vetoed H.R. 219, an act to alter and amend an act, entitled "An act to ascertain and fix the military establishment of the United States." Override attempt failed in House on March 1, 1797, 55–36 (61 votes needed).

=== John Adams ===
No vetoes.

=== Thomas Jefferson ===
No vetoes.

=== James Madison ===
Seven vetoes (five regular vetoes and two pocket vetoes).

1. February 21, 1811: Vetoed H.R. 155, an act incorporating the Protestant Episcopal Church in the town of Alexandria, in the District of Columbia. Override attempt failed in House on February 23, 1811, 29–74 (69 votes needed).
2. February 28, 1811: Vetoed H.R. 170, an act for the relief of Richard Tervin, William Coleman, Edwin Lewis, Samuel Mims, Joseph Wilson, and the Baptist Church at Salem meeting house, in the Mississippi Territory. Override attempt failed in House on March 2, 1811, 33–55 (59 votes needed).
3. April 3, 1812: Vetoed H.R. 81, an act for the trial of Causes pending in the respective District Courts of the United States, in case of the absence or disability of the Judges thereof. Override attempt failed in House on April 8, 1812, 26–70 (64 votes needed).
4. July 1812: Pocket-vetoed H.R. 170, an act on the subject of a uniform rule of naturalization.
5. January 30, 1815: Vetoed S. 67, an act to incorporate the subscribers to the Bank of the United States of America. Override attempt failed in Senate on February 2, 1815, 15–19 (23 votes needed).
6. May 9, 1816: Pocket-vetoed H.R. 106, an act to provide for free importation of stereotype plates and to encourage the printing and gratuitous distribution of the Scriptures by the Bible societies within the United States.
7. March 3, 1817: Vetoed H.R. 29, an act to set apart and pledge certain funds for internal improvements. Override attempt failed in House on March 3, 1817, 60–56 (78 votes needed).

=== James Monroe ===
One regular veto.

1. May 4, 1822: Vetoed H.R. 50, an act for the preservation and repair of the Cumberland Road. Override attempt failed in House on May 6, 1822, 68–72 (94 votes needed).

=== John Quincy Adams ===
No vetoes.

=== Andrew Jackson ===
Twelve vetoes (five regular vetoes and seven pocket vetoes).

1. May 27, 1830: Vetoed H.R. 285, an act to authorize a subscription of stock in the Maysville, Washington, Paris, and Lexington Turnpike Road Company. Override attempt failed in House on May 28, 1830, 96–92 (126 votes needed).
2. May 31, 1830: Vetoed S. 27, an act to authorize a subscription of stock in the Washington Turnpike Road Company. Override attempt failed in Senate on May 31, 1830, 21–17 (26 votes needed).
3. June 1830: Pocket-vetoed S. 74, an act to authorize a subscription for stock on the part of the United States in the Louisville and Portland Canal Company.
4. June 1830: Pocket-vetoed H.R. 304, an act for making appropriations for building light-houses, light-boats, and monuments, placing buoys, and improving harbors and directing surveys.
5. July 10, 1832: Vetoed S. 147, an act to modify and continue the act entitled "An act to incorporate the subscribers to the Bank of the United States." Override attempt failed in Senate on July 13, 1832, 22–19 (28 votes needed).
6. July 1832: Pocket-vetoed S. 5, an act for the final settlement of the claims of States for interests on advances to the United States, made during the last war.
7. July 1832: Pocket-vetoed H.R. 516, an act for the improvement of certain harbors, and the navigation of certain rivers.
8. March 1833: Pocket-vetoed S. 6, an act to appropriate, for a limited time, the proceeds of the sales of the public lands of the United States, and for granting lands to certain states.
9. July 1834: Pocket-vetoed S. 97, an act to improve the navigation of the Wabash River.
10. March 3, 1835: Vetoed S. 160, an act to authorize the Secretary of the Treasury to compromise the claims allowed by the Commissioners under the treaty with the King of the Two Sicilies, concluded October 14, 1832. No override attempt made.
11. June 10, 1836: Vetoed S. 141, an act to appoint a day for the annual meeting of Congress. Override attempt failed in Senate on June 27, 1836, 16–23 (26 votes needed).
12. March 1837: Pocket-vetoed S. 144, an act designating and limiting the funds receivable for the revenues of the United States.

=== Martin Van Buren ===
One pocket veto.

1. March 1839: Pocket-vetoed S. Res. 15, a resolution to provide for the distribution, in part, of the Madison Papers.

=== William Henry Harrison ===
No vetoes.

=== John Tyler ===
Ten vetoes (six regular vetoes and four pocket vetoes). One was overridden.

1. August 16, 1841: Vetoed S. 5, an act to incorporate the subscribers to the Fiscal Bank of the United States. Override attempt failed in Senate on August 19, 1841, 25–24 (33 votes needed).
2. September 9, 1841: Vetoed H.R. 14, an act to provide for the better collection, safekeeping, and disbursement of the public revenue, by means of a corporation to be styled the Fiscal Corporation of the United States. Override attempt failed in House on September 10, 1841, 92–87 (120 votes needed).
3. August 9, 1842: Vetoed H.R. 472, an act to provide revenue from imports, and to charge and modify existing laws imposing duties on imports. Override attempt failed in House on August 17, 1842, 92–87 (120 votes needed).
4. June 29, 1842: Vetoed H.R. 480, an act to extend for a limited period the present laws for laying and collecting duties on imports. Override attempt failed in House on July 4, 1842, 114–97 (141 votes needed).
5. September 1842: Pocket-vetoed H.R. 210, an act regulating the taking of testimony on cases of contested elections.
6. September 1842: Pocket-vetoed H.R. 604, an act to appropriate the proceeds of the sales of public lands, and to grant pre-exemption rights.
7. March 1843: Pocket-vetoed H.J. Res. 37, a joint resolution directing payment of the certificates or awards issued by the commissioners under the treaty with the Cherokee Indians.
8. June 11, 1844: Vetoed H.R. 203, an act making appropriations for the improvement of certain harbors and rivers. Override attempt failed in House on June 11, 1844, 104–84 (126 votes needed).
9. February 20, 1845: Vetoed S. 66, an act relating to revenue cutters and steamers. Overridden by Senate on March 3, 1845, 41–1 (28 votes needed). Overridden by House on March 3, 1845, 127–30 (105 votes needed). Enacted over the president's veto (5 Stat. 795).
10. March 1845: Pocket-vetoed H.R. 541, an act making appropriations for the improvements of navigation of certain harbors and rivers.

=== James K. Polk ===
Three vetoes (two regular vetoes and one pocket veto).

1. August 8, 1845: Vetoed S. 68, an act to provide for the ascertainment and satisfaction of claims of American citizens for spoliations committed by the French prior to the July 31, 1801. Override attempt failed in Senate on August 10, 1846, 27–15 (28 votes needed).
2. August 3, 1846: Vetoed H.R. 18, an act making appropriations for the improvement of certain harbors and rivers. Override attempt failed in House on August 4, 1846, 97–91 (126 votes needed).
3. March 1847: Pocket-vetoed H.R. 84, an act to provide for continuing certain works in the Territory of Wisconsin.

=== Zachary Taylor ===
No vetoes.

=== Millard Fillmore ===
No vetoes.

=== Franklin Pierce ===
Nine regular vetoes. Five were overridden.

1. May 3, 1854: Vetoed S. 44, an act making a grant of public lands to the several States for the benefit of indigent insane persons. Override attempt failed in Senate on July 6, 1854, 21–26 (32 votes needed).
2. February 17, 1855: Vetoed H.R. 117, an act to provide for the ascertainment of claims of American citizens or spoliations committed by the French prior to July 31, 1801. Override attempt failed in House on February 19, 1855, 113–86 (133 votes needed).
3. August 4, 1854: Vetoed H.R. 392, an act making appropriations for the repair, preservation, and completion of certain public works, heretofore commenced under authority of law. Override attempt failed in House on December 6, 1854, 95–80 (117 votes needed).
4. March 3, 1855: Vetoed H.R. 595, an act making appropriations for the transportation of the United States mail, by ocean steamships and otherwise, during the fiscal years ending the 30th of June, 1855 and the 30th of June, 1856. Override attempt failed in House on March 3, 1855, 79–99 (119 votes needed).
5. May 19, 1856: Vetoed S. 1, an act making an appropriation for deepening the channel over the St. Clair Flats, in the State of Michigan. Overridden by Senate on July 7, 1856, 28–8 (24 votes needed). Overridden by House on July 8, 1856, 139–55 (130 votes needed). Enacted over the president's veto (11 Stat. 25).
6. May 19, 1856: Vetoed S. 14, an act to remove obstructions to navigation in the mouth of the Mississippi River, at the Southwest Pass and Pass a l'Outre. Overridden by Senate on July 7, 1856, 31–12 (29 votes needed). Overridden by House on July 8, 1856, 143–55 (132 votes needed). Enacted over the president's veto (11 Stat. 24).
7. May 22, 1856: Vetoed S. 2, an act making an appropriation for deepening the channel over the flats of the St. Mary's River, in the State of Michigan. Overridden by Senate on July 7, 1856, 28–10 (26 votes needed). Overridden by House on July 8, 1856, 136–54 (127 votes needed). Enacted over the president's veto (11 Stat. 25).
8. August 11, 1856: Vetoed H.R. 12, an act for continuing the improvement of the Des Moines Rapids, in the Mississippi River. Overridden by House on August 11, 1856, 130–54 (123 votes needed). Overridden by Senate on August 16, 1856, 30–14 (30 votes needed). Enacted over the president's veto (11 Stat. 51).
9. August 14, 1856: Vetoed S. 53, an act for the improvement of the navigation of the Patapsco River, and to render the port of Baltimore accessible to the war steamers of the United States. Overridden by Senate on August 16, 1856, 31–14 (30 votes needed). Overridden by House on August 16, 1856, 127–47 (116 votes needed). Enacted over the president's veto (11 Stat. 44).

=== James Buchanan ===
Seven vetoes (four regular vetoes and three pocket vetoes):

1. June 1858: Pocket-vetoed H.J. Res. 37, a joint resolution in regard to the carrying of the United States mails from St. Joseph's, Missouri, to Placerville, California.
2. February 24, 1859: Vetoed H.R. 2, an act donating public lands to the several States and Territories which may provide colleges for the benefit of agriculture and the mechanic arts. Override attempt failed in House on February 26, 1859, 105–96 (134 votes needed).
3. March 1859: Pocket-vetoed S. 321, an act making an appropriation for deepening the channel over the St. Clair flats, in the State of Michigan.
4. March 1859: Pocket-vetoed S.J. Res. 87, a joint resolution in relation to removal of obstructions to navigation in the mouth of the Mississippi River.
5. April 17, 1860: Vetoed S. 29, an act for the relief of Arthur Edwards and his associates. Override attempt failed in Senate on June 7, 1860, 22–30 (35 votes needed).
6. June 22, 1860: Vetoed S. 416, an act to secure homesteads to actual settlers on the public domain. Override attempt failed in Senate on June 23, 1860, 28–18 (31 votes needed).
7. January 25, 1861: Vetoed H.R. 915, an act for the relief of Hockaday and Leggit. Override attempt failed in House on January 26, 1861, 81–67 (99 votes needed).

=== Abraham Lincoln ===
Seven vetoes (two regular vetoes and five pocket vetoes):

1. June 23, 1862: Vetoed S. 193, an act to repeal that part of an act of Congress which prohibits the circulation of bank notes of a less denomination than five dollars within the District of Columbia. No override attempt made.
2. July 2, 1862: Vetoed S. 343, an act to provide for additional medical officers of the volunteer service. Override attempt failed in Senate on July 2, 1862, 0–37 (25 votes needed).
3. March 14, 1863: Pocket-vetoed S. 424, an act to amend an act entitled, "An act to establish and equalize the grades of line officers of the U.S. Navy."
4. July 15, 1864: Pocket-vetoed H.R. 244, the Wade-Davis Bill, an act to guarantee to certain States, whose governments have been usurped or overthrown, a republican form of government.
5. July 1864: Pocket-vetoed H.J. Res. 123, a joint resolution to correct certain clerical errors in the internal revenue act.
6. March 1865: Pocket-vetoed H.R. 805, an act to repeal the eighth section of an act entitled, "An act in addition to the several acts concerning commercial intercourse between loyal and insurrectionary States, and to provide for the collection of captured and abandoned property, and the prevention of frauds in States declared in insurrection."
7. March 1865: Pocket-vetoed H.J. Res. 161, a joint resolution in relation to certain railroads.

=== Andrew Johnson ===
29 vetoes (21 regular vetoes and eight pocket vetoes). 15 were overridden.

1. February 19, 1866: Vetoed S. 60, an act to establish a Bureau for the Relief of Freedmen and Refugees. Override attempt failed in Senate on February 20, 1866, 30–18 (32 votes needed).
2. March 27, 1866: Vetoed S. 61, an act to protect all persons in the United States in their civil rights, and furnish the means of their vindication. Overridden by Senate on April 6, 1866, 33–15 (32 votes needed). Overridden by House on April 9, 1866, 122–41 (109 votes needed). Enacted over the president's veto (14 Stat. 27).
3. May 15, 1866: Vetoed S. 74, an act for the admission of the State of Colorado into the Union. No override attempt made.
4. June 15, 1866: Vetoed S. 203, an act to enable the New York and Montana Iron Mining and Manufacturing Company to purchase a certain amount of the public lands not now in market. No override attempt made.
5. July 28, 1866: Vetoed H.R. 466, an act erecting the Territory of Montana into a surveying district. No override attempt made.
6. July 16, 1866: Vetoed H.R. 613, an act to continue in force and to amend an act entitled "An act to establish a Bureau for the Relief of Freedmen and Refugees," and for other purposes. Overridden by House on July 16, 1866, 103–33 (91 votes needed). Overridden by Senate on July 16, 1866, 33–12 (30 votes needed). Enacted over the president's veto (14 Stat. 173).
7. August 4, 1866: Pocket-vetoed H.J. Res. 191, a joint resolution relating to the building lately occupied for a national fair in aid of the orphans of soldiers and sailors of the United States.
8. August 8, 1866: Pocket-vetoed S. 447, an act for the admission of the State of Nebraska into the Union.
9. January 5, 1867: Vetoed S. 1, an act to regulate the elective franchise in the District of Columbia. Overridden by Senate on January 7, 1867, 29–10 (26 votes needed). Overridden by House on January 8, 1867, 112–38 (100 votes needed). Enacted over the president's veto (14 Stat. 375).
10. January 28, 1867: Vetoed S. 462, an act to admit the State of Colorado into the Union. Override attempt failed in Senate on March 1, 1867, 29–19 (32 votes needed).
11. January 29, 1867: Vetoed S. 456, an act for the admission of the State of Nebraska into the Union. Overridden by Senate on February 8, 1867, 31–9 (27 votes needed). Overridden by House on February 9, 1867, 120–44 (110 votes needed). Enacted over the president's veto (14 Stat. 391).
12. March 2, 1867: Vetoed S. 453, an act regulating the tenure of certain civil offices. Overridden by Senate on March 2, 1867, 35–11 (31 votes needed). Overridden by House on March 2, 1867, 138–40 (119 votes needed). Enacted over the president's veto (14 Stat. 430).
13. March 2, 1867: Vetoed H.R. 1143, an act to provide for the more efficient government of the rebel States. Overridden by House on March 2, 1867, 138–51 (126 votes needed). Overridden by Senate on March 2, 1867, 38–10 (32 votes needed). Enacted over the president's veto (14 Stat. 432).
14. March 23, 1867: Vetoed H.R. 33, an act supplementary to an act entitled, "An act to provide for more efficient government of the rebel States." Overridden by House on March 23, 1867, 114–25 (93 votes needed). Overridden by Senate on March 23, 1867, 40–7 (32 votes needed). Enacted over the president's veto (15 Stat. 2).
15. April 12, 1867: Pocket-vetoed H.J. Res. 6, a joint resolution placing certain troops of Missouri on an equal footing with volunteers as to bounties.
16. July 19, 1867: Vetoed H.R. 123, an act supplementary to an act entitled, "An act to provide for more efficient government of the rebel States." Overridden by House on July 19, 1867, 109–25 (90 votes needed). Overridden by Senate on July 19, 1867, 30–6 (24 votes needed). Enacted over the president's veto (15 Stat. 14).
17. July 19, 1867: Vetoed H.J. Res. 71, a joint resolution to carry into effect the several acts providing for the more efficient government of the rebel States. Overridden by House on July 19, 1867, 99–22 (81 votes needed). Overridden by Senate on July 19, 1867, 32–4 (24 votes needed). Enacted over the president's veto (15 Stat. 14).
18. August 1, 1867: Pocket-vetoed S. 137, an act for the further security of equal rights in the District of Columbia.
19. December 23, 1867: Pocket-vetoed S. 141, an act for the further security of equal rights in the District of Columbia.
20. January 1, 1868: Pocket-vetoed H.R. 161, an act to incorporate the congregation of the First Presbyterian Church of Washington.
21. March 25, 1868: Vetoed S. 213, an act to amend an act entitled, "An Act to amend the judiciary act, passed, September 24, 1789." Overridden by Senate on March 26, 1868, 33–9 (28 votes needed). Overridden by House on March 27, 1868, 115–34 (100 votes needed). Enacted over the president's veto (15 Stat. 44).
22. June 20, 1868: Vetoed H.R. 1039, an act to admit the State of Arkansas to representation in Congress. Overridden by House on June 20, 1868, 111–31 (95 votes needed). Overridden by Senate on June 22, 1868, 30–7 (25 votes needed). Enacted over the president's veto (15 Stat. 72).
23. June 25, 1868: Vetoed H.R. 1058, an act to admit the States of North Carolina, South Carolina, Louisiana, Georgia, Alabama, and Florida, to representation in Congress. Overridden by House on June 25, 1868, 108–38 (94 votes needed). Overridden by Senate on June 25, 1868, 35–8 (29 votes needed). Enacted over the president's veto (15 Stat. 73).
24. July 20, 1868: Vetoed S.J. Res. 139, a joint resolution excluding from the electoral college the votes of States lately in rebellion which shall not have been reorganized. Overridden by Senate on July 20, 1868, 45–8 (36 votes needed). Overridden by House on July 20, 1868, 134–36 (114 votes needed). Enacted over the president's veto (15 Stat. 257).
25. July 25, 1868: Vetoed S. 567, an act relating to the Freedman's Bureau and providing for its discontinuance. Overridden by Senate on July 25, 1868, 42–5 (32 votes needed). Overridden by House on July 25, 1868, 115–23 (92 votes needed). Enacted over the president's veto (15 Stat. 193).
26. August 5, 1868: Pocket-vetoed S. 491, an act to provide for the appointment of recorder of deeds in the District of Columbia.
27. August 7, 1868: Pocket-vetoed S. 207, an act for funding the national debt, and for the conversion of the notes of the United States.
28. February 13, 1869: Vetoed S. 609, an act transferring the duties of trustees of colored schools of Washington and Georgetown. No override attempt made.
29. February 22, 1869: Vetoed H.R. 1460, an act regulating the duties on imported copper and copper ores. Overridden by House on February 23, 1869, 115–56 (114 votes needed). Overridden by Senate on February 24, 1869, 38–12 (34 votes needed). Enacted over the president's veto (15 Stat. 274).

=== Ulysses S. Grant ===
93 vetoes (45 regular vetoes and 48 pocket vetoes). Four were overridden.

1. April 20, 1869: Pocket-vetoed H.J. Res. 29, a joint resolution for the relief of Blanton Duncan.
2. January 11, 1870: Vetoed S. 273, an act for the relief of Rollin White. Overridden by Senate on May 31, 1870, 41–13 (36 votes needed). Override attempt failed in House on June 22, 1870, 12–168 (120 votes needed).
3. July 14, 1870: Vetoed S. 476, an act to fix the status of certain Federal soldiers enlisting in the Union Army from the States of Alabama and Florida. No override attempt made.
4. January 4, 1871: Vetoed H.R. 1395, an act for the relief of Charles Cooper, Goshorn A. Jones, Jerome Rowley, William Hannegan and John Hannegan. No override attempt made.
5. February 7, 1871: Vetoed S.J. Res. 92, a joint resolution for the relief of certain contractors for the construction of vessels of war and steam machinery. Override attempt failed in Senate on February 16, 1871, 2–57 (40 votes needed).
6. February 28, 1871: Vetoed H.R. 2566, an act for the relief of Henry Willman, late a private in the Third Regiment Indian Cavalry. No override attempt made.
7. March 13, 1871: Pocket-vetoed H.R. 1831, an act to confirm the title of the Rancho del Rio Grande, in New Mexico, to the heirs and legal representatives of the original grantees thereof.
8. March 15, 1871: Pocket-vetoed H.R. 2334, an act granting a pension to Adam Correll.
9. March 15, 1871: Pocket-vetoed H.R. 2591, an act relating to telegraphic communication between the United States and foreign countries.
10. March 15, 1871: Pocket-vetoed S. 109, an act in relation to the Selma, Rome, and Dalton Railroad Company, Alabama.
11. March 15, 1871: Pocket-vetoed S. 493, an act for the relief of George Wright.
12. March 15, 1871: Pocket-vetoed S. 762, an act for the relief of Joseph Ormsby.
13. March 15, 1871: Pocket-vetoed S. 799, an act for the relief of Anna M. Howard.
14. March 15, 1871: Pocket-vetoed S. 995, an act for the relief of purchasers of lands sold for taxes in the insurrectionary States.
15. March 15, 1871: Pocket-vetoed S. 1213, an act for the relief of Mary M. Clark, the widow of Leonard Clark, deceased.
16. March 15, 1871: Pocket-vetoed S.J. Res. 295, a joint resolution relating to rights of actual settlers upon certain lands in Iowa.
17. May 1, 1871: Pocket-vetoed S. 294, an act for the relief of the inhabitants of the town of Arcata, in Humboldt County, California.
18. March 18, 1872: Vetoed H.R. 1550, an act for the relief of the estate of Dr. John F. Hanks. Overridden by House on January 18, 1873, 126–17 (96 votes needed). No override attempt made in Senate.
19. April 1, 1872: Vetoed H.R. 1867, an act for the relief of James T. Johnson. No override attempt made.
20. April 10, 1872: Vetoed H.R. 2041, an act for the relief of the children of John M. Baker, deceased. No override attempt made.
21. April 15, 1872: Vetoed S. 805, an act granting a pension to Abigail Ryan, widow of Thomas A. Ryan. No override attempt made.
22. April 22, 1872: Vetoed H.R. 622, an act granting a pension to Richard B. Crawford. No override attempt made.
23. May 14, 1872: Vetoed S. 955, an act granting a pension to Mary Ann Montgomery, widow of William W. Montgomery, late captain in the Texas volunteers. Overridden by Senate on May 17, 1872, 44–1 (30 votes needed). Overridden by House on June 7, 1872, 101–44 (97 votes needed). Enacted over the president's veto (17 Stat. 677).
24. June 1, 1872: Vetoed S. 105, an act for the relief of Dr. J. Milton Best. No override attempt made.
25. June 7, 1872: Vetoed S. 569, an act for the relief of Thomas B. Wallace, of Lexington, in the State of Missouri. No override attempt made.
26. June 20, 1872: Pocket-vetoed H.R. 1424, an act to reimburse John E. Woodward for certain moneys paid by him.
27. June 20, 1872: Pocket-vetoed H.R. 2622, an act for the relief of James De Long, late consul at Aux Cayes, Hayti.
28. January 6, 1873: Vetoed H.R. 2291, an act for the relief of Edmund Jussen. No override attempt made.
29. January 22, 1873: Vetoed H.R. 630, an act in relation to new trials in the Court of Claims. No override attempt made.
30. January 29, 1873: Vetoed S. 490, an act for the relief of the East Tennessee University. No override attempt made.
31. February 8, 1873: Vetoed H.R. 2852, an act for the relief of James A. McCullah, late collector of the fifth district of Missouri. No override attempt made.
32. February 11, 1873: Vetoed S. 161, an act for the relief of those suffering from the destruction of saltworks near Manchester, Kentucky, pursuant to the order of Major-General Buell. No override attempt made.
33. March 3, 1873: Pocket-vetoed H.R. 3369, an act for the relief of George S. Gustin, late a private of Company D, Seventy-Fourth Regiment Illinois Infantry Volunteers.
34. March 6, 1873: Pocket-vetoed S. 96, an act for the relief of Cowan and Dickinson, of Knoxville, Tennessee.
35. March 6, 1873: Pocket-vetoed S. 1168, an act to amend an act entitled, "An act to remove the charge of desertion from certain soldiers of the Thirteenth Tennessee Cavalry."
36. March 10, 1873: Pocket-vetoed H.R. 2264, an act to authorize the Cattaraugus and Allegany Indians in New York to lease lands and confirm leases.
37. March 13, 1873: Pocket-vetoed H.R. 1868, an act for the relief of Elias C. Boudinot.
38. March 13, 1873: Pocket-vetoed H.R. 2902, an act for the relief of the estates of Abel Gilbert and William Gerrish, late copartners in business under the style of Gilbert and Gerrish.
39. March 13, 1873: Pocket-vetoed H.R. 3878, an act for the relief of Mrs. Louisa Eldis.
40. March 14, 1873: Pocket-vetoed H.R. 2803, an act for the relief of Samuel J. Potter.
41. March 14, 1873: Pocket-vetoed H.R. 3484, an act granting a pension to Asenath Stephenson.
42. March 14, 1873: Pocket-vetoed H.R. 3731, an act to confirm certain land titles in the State of Missouri.
43. March 14, 1873: Pocket-vetoed H.R. 3857, an act for the relief of J. George Harris.
44. March 14, 1873: Pocket-vetoed S. 166, an act for the relief of David Braden.
45. March 14, 1873: Pocket-vetoed S. 245, an act amendatory of an act for the construction of a bridge across the Arkansas River, at Little Rock, Arkansas.
46. March 14, 1873: Pocket-vetoed S. 809, an act to establish an assay-office at Helena, in the Territory of Montana.
47. March 14, 1873: Pocket-vetoed S. 1109, an act for the relief of Edward Berry, John McFall, and William H. Judd.
48. March 14, 1873: Pocket-vetoed S. 1480, an act for the relief of W.W. Elliott.
49. April 10, 1874: Vetoed H.R. 1224, an act for the relief of William H. Denniston, late an acting second lieutenant, Seventieth New York volunteers. No override attempt made.
50. April 22, 1874: Vetoed S. 617, an act to fix the amount of United States notes and the circulation of national banks. Override attempt failed in Senate on April 28, 1874, 34–30 (43 votes needed).
51. May 12, 1874: Vetoed H.R. 1331, an act for the relief of Joab Spencer and James R. Mead, for supplies furnished the Kansas tribe of Indians. No override attempt made.
52. June 29, 1874: Pocket-vetoed H.R. 1313, an act for the relief of Alexander Burtch.
53. July 4, 1874: Pocket-vetoed H.R. 921, an act to prevent the useless slaughter of buffaloes within the territories of the United States.
54. January 30, 1875: Vetoed H.R. 4462, an act for the relief of Alexander Burtch. No override attempt made.
55. February 12, 1875: Vetoed H.R. 2352, an act granting a pension to Lewis Hinely. No override attempt made.
56. March 6, 1875: Pocket-vetoed H.R. 4669, an act to provide for the selection of grand and petit jurors in the District of Columbia.
57. March 6, 1875: Pocket-vetoed H.J. Res. 51, a joint resolution in relation to civil service examinations.
58. March 12, 1875: Pocket-vetoed S. 935, an act to provide for writs of error in certain criminal cases, for hearings therein, and in cases of habeas corpus.
59. March 15, 1875: Pocket-vetoed H.R. 3170, an act for the relief of John W. Marsh.
60. March 15, 1875: Pocket-vetoed H.R. 3341, an act to equalize the bounties of soldiers who served in the war for the Union.
61. March 15, 1875: Pocket-vetoed S. 271, an act for the relief of Frances A. Robinson, administratrix of the estate of John M. Robinson, deceased.
62. March 15, 1875: Pocket-vetoed S. 878, an act for the relief of Rosa Vertner Jeffreys.
63. March 15, 1875: Pocket-vetoed S. 909, an act approving an act of the legislative assembly of Colorado Territory.
64. March 15, 1875: Pocket-vetoed S. 951, an act for the relief of John Montgomery and Thomas E. Williams.
65. March 27, 1876: Vetoed H.R. 83, an act to provide for the relief of James A. Hile, of Lewis County, Missouri. No override attempt made.
66. February 3, 1876: Vetoed H.R. 1561, an act transferring the custody of certain Indian trust funds from the Secretary of the Interior to the Treasurer of the United States. No override attempt made.
67. March 31, 1876: Vetoed S. 489, an act for the relief of G.B. Tyler and E.H. Luckett, assignees of William T. Cheatham. Overridden by Senate on May 20, 1876, 46–0 (31 votes needed). Overridden by House on May 26, 1876, 181–14 (130 votes needed). Enacted over the president's veto (19 Stat. 435).
68. April 18, 1876: Vetoed S. 172, an act fixing the salary of the President of the United States. No override attempt made.
69. May 26, 1876: Vetoed H.R. 1922, an act providing for the recording of deeds, mortgages, and other conveyances affecting real estate in the District of Columbia. No override attempt made.
70. June 9, 1876: Vetoed S. 165, an act for the relief of Michael W. Brock, of Megis County, Tennessee, late a private in Company D, Tenth Tennessee Volunteers. No override attempt made.
71. June 30, 1876: Vetoed S. 692, an act to amend chapter 166 of the laws of the second session of the Forty-third Congress relating to the Fox and Wisconsin Rivers. No override attempt made.
72. July 11, 1876: Vetoed H.R. 1337, an act to provide for the relief of Nelson Tiffany. Overridden by House on July 28, 1876, 177–1 (119 votes needed). Overridden by Senate on July 31, 1876, 40–0 (27 votes needed). Enacted over the president's veto (19 Stat. 472).
73. July 13, 1876: Vetoed H.R. 11, an act to provide a pension to Eliza Jane Blumer. No override attempt made.
74. July 20, 1876: Vetoed H.R. 2684, an act to amend sections 3496, 3951, and 3954 of the Revised Statutes, relating to bids and contracts. No override attempt made.
75. August 14, 1876: Vetoed H.R. 36, an act to restore the name of Capt. Edward S. Meyer to the active list of the Army. No override attempt made.
76. August 15, 1876: Vetoed H.R. 4085, an act to repeal part of section 5 of an act entitled, "An act authorizing the repavement of Pennsylvania Avenue." No override attempt made.
77. August 15, 1876: Vetoed S. 561, an act for the relief of Major Junius T. Turner. No override attempt made.
78. August 15, 1876: Vetoed S. 779, an act to provide for the sale of a portion of the reservation of the Confederated Otoe and Missouria and the Sac and Foxes of the Missouri Tribes of Indians in the States of Kansas and Nebraska. Overridden by Senate on August 15, 1876, 36–0 (24 votes needed). Overridden by House on August 15, 1876, 120–18 (92 votes needed). Enacted over the president's veto (19 Stat. 208).
79. August 24, 1876: Pocket-vetoed S. 990, an act to remove the political disabilities of Reuben Davis, of Mississippi.
80. January 15, 1877: Vetoed H.R. 2041, an act to amend section 2291 of the Revised Statutes of the United States, in relation to proof required in homestead entries. No override attempt made.
81. January 23, 1877: Vetoed H.R. 4350, an act to abolish the Board of Commissioners from the District of Columbia Police Department. Overridden by House on January 30, 1877, 159–78 (158 votes needed). Override attempt failed in Senate on February 6, 1877, 33–22 (37 votes needed).
82. January 26, 1877: Vetoed H.J. Res. 171, a joint resolution in reference to congratulations from the Republic of Pretoria, South Africa. No override attempt made.
83. January 26, 1877: Vetoed H.J. Res. 172, a joint resolution in reference to congratulations from the Argentine Republic. No override attempt made.
84. January 26, 1877: Vetoed S. 685, an act to place the name of Daniel H. Kelly upon the muster-roll of Company F, Second Tennessee Infantry. No override attempt made.
85. February 14, 1877: Vetoed H.R. 3156, an act to perfect the revision of the Statutes of the United States. Override attempt failed in House on February 15, 1877, 1–211 (142 votes needed).
86. February 14, 1877: Vetoed H.R. 3367, an act to remove the charge of desertion of Alfred Rowland from military records. No override attempt made.
87. February 28, 1877: Vetoed S. 691, an act to provide for the relief of Edward A. Leland. No override attempt made.
88. March 12, 1877: Pocket-vetoed S. 2833, an act to provide for the relief of Susan P. Vance.
89. March 14, 1877: Pocket-vetoed S. 407, an act to authorize the restoration of George A. Armes to the rank of captain.
90. March 14, 1877: Pocket-vetoed S. 780, an act to provide for the relief of the Richmond Female Institute, Richmond, Virginia.
91. March 14, 1877: Pocket-vetoed S. 973, an act to provide for the relief of Elizabeth Carson.
92. March 14, 1877: Pocket-vetoed S. 974, an act to provide for the relief of Francis Guilbeau, San Antonio, Texas.
93. March 14, 1877: Pocket-vetoed S. 1284, an act to provide for the relief of William E. Hickham, Missouri.

H.R. 4476, an act to provide for the appointment of shorthand reporters in and for the United States Courts in California, was not presented to the President for his signature. It therefore expired at the adjournment sine die of the 44th Congress on March 3, 1877, but is not counted in the tables above.

=== Rutherford B. Hayes ===
13 vetoes (twelve regular vetoes and one pocket veto). One was overridden.

1. February 28, 1878: Vetoed H.R. 1093, the Bland–Allison Act, an act to authorize the coinage of the standard silver dollar and to restore its legal-tender character. Overridden by House on February 28, 1878, 196–73 (180 votes needed). Overridden by Senate on February 28, 1878, 46–19 (44 votes needed). Enacted over the president's veto (20 Stat. 25).
2. March 6, 1878: Vetoed H.R. 3072, an act to authorize a special term of circuit courts of the United States for the southern district of Mississippi, to be held at Scranton, in Jackson County. No override attempt made.
3. March 1, 1879: Vetoed H.R. 2423, an act to restrict the immigration of Chinese to the United States. Override attempt failed in House on March 1, 1879, 110–96 (138 votes needed).
4. March 13, 1879: Pocket-vetoed S. 989, an act to provide for the relief of certain settlers on the public lands, and to provide for the repayment of certain fees and commissions paid on void entries of public lands.
5. June 27, 1879: Vetoed S. 595, an act to amend an act for the relief of Joseph B. Collins, approved March 3, 1879. No override attempt made.
6. April 29, 1879: Vetoed H.R. 1, an act making appropriations for the support of the Army for fiscal year ending June 30, 1880. Override attempt failed in House on May 1, 1879, 121–110 (154 votes needed).
7. May 29, 1879: Vetoed H.R. 2, an act making appropriations for legislative, executive and judicial expenses of the Government for the fiscal year ending June 30, 1880. Override attempt failed in House on May 29, 1879, 114–93 (138 votes needed).
8. May 12, 1879: Vetoed H.R. 1382, an act to prohibit military interference at elections. Override attempt failed in House on May 13, 1879, 128–97 (150 votes needed).
9. June 23, 1879: Vetoed H.R. 2252, an act making appropriations for certain judicial expenses. Override attempt failed in House on June 23, 1879, 102–78 (120 votes needed).
10. June 30, 1879: Vetoed H.R. 2382, an act making appropriations to pay fees of United States Marshals and their general deputies. Override attempt failed in House on June 30, 1879, 85–63 (99 votes needed).
11. May 4, 1880: Vetoed H.R. 4924, an act making appropriations to supply certain deficiencies in the appropriations for the service of the Government for the fiscal year ending June 30, 1880. No override attempt made.
12. June 15, 1880: Vetoed S. 1726, an act regulating pay and appointment of special deputy marshals. No override attempt made.
13. March 3, 1881: Vetoed H.R. 4592, an act to facilitate the refunding of the national debt. No override attempt made.

=== James Garfield ===
No vetoes.

=== Chester Arthur ===
Twelve vetoes (four regular vetoes and eight pocket vetoes. One was overridden.

1. April 4, 1882: Vetoed S. 71, an act to execute certain treaty stipulations relating to Chinese. Override attempt failed in Senate on April 5, 1882, 29–21 (34 votes needed).
2. July 1, 1882: Vetoed H.R. 2744, an act to regulate the carriage of passengers by sea. No override attempt made.
3. August 1, 1882: Vetoed H.R. 6242, an act making appropriations for the construction, repair, and preservation of certain workers on rivers and harbors. Overridden by House on August 2, 1882, 122–59 (121 votes needed). Overridden by Senate on August 2, 1882, 41–16 (38 votes needed). Enacted over the president's veto (22 Stat. 191).
4. July 2, 1884: Vetoed H.R. 1015, an act to provide for the relief of Fitz-John Porter. Overridden by House on July 2, 1884, 168–78 (164 votes needed). Override attempt failed in Senate on July 3, 1884, 27–27 (36 votes needed).
5. July 9, 1884: Pocket-vetoed S. 81, an act to confirm the title of Benjamin F. Pope to his office of assistant surgeon, in the United States Army.
6. July 9, 1884: Pocket-vetoed S. 472, an act to provide for the relief of George P. Webster.
7. July 11, 1884: Pocket-vetoed S. 42, an act to provide for the relief of Joseph F. Wilson.
8. July 17, 1884: Pocket-vetoed H.R. 2487, an act to provide for the relief of Brevet Major General William W. Averell, United States Army.
9. July 17, 1884: Pocket-vetoed H.J. Res. 17, a joint resolution authorizing the appointment and retirement of Samuel Kramer as a chaplain in the Navy of the United States.
10. July 18, 1884: Pocket-vetoed S. 28, an act to confirm the status of John N. Quackenbush as a commander in the United States Navy.
11. March 14, 1885: Pocket-vetoed H.R. 78, an act to provide for the retirement of Colonel Henry J. Hunt as a major general of the United States Army.
12. March 14, 1885: Pocket-vetoed H.J. Res. 170, a joint resolution relating to a claim made by Doctor John B. Read against the United States.

=== Grover Cleveland ===
584 vetoes (346 regular vetoes and 238 pocket vetoes). Seven were overridden.

Strongly opposed to what he perceived as "pork barrel" spending, and favoring limited government, he vetoed more than 200 private bills granting pensions to individual Civil War veterans. Reacting to these vetoes, Congress passed a bill that would have granted a pension to any disabled veteran. He vetoed this bill as well. This is widely perceived to have been a factor in the defeat of his 1888 bid for re-election. In addition to these, he also vetoed a bill that would have distributed seed grain to drought-stricken farmers in the American West, and bills increasing the monetary supply. He also refused to sign, but did not veto, the Wilson–Gorman Tariff Act.

=== Benjamin Harrison ===
44 vetoes (19 regular vetoes and 25 pocket vetoes). One was overridden.

1. April 26, 1890: Vetoed H.R. 7170, an act to authorize the city of Ogden, Utah to assume an increased indebtedness. No override attempt made.
2. April 29, 1890: Vetoed H.R. 848, an act to authorize the construction of an addition to the public building at Dallas, Texas. Overridden by House on February 10, 1891, 143–69 (142 votes needed). No override attempt made in Senate.
3. June 4, 1890: Vetoed S. 1306, an act for the erection of a public building at Hudson, New York. No override attempt made.
4. June 12, 1890: Vetoed H.R. 7175, an act for the erection of a public building at Tuscaloosa, Alabama. No override attempt made.
5. June 19, 1890: Vetoed S. 1762, an act to change the boundaries of the Uncompahgre Reservation. No override attempt made.
6. June 20, 1890: Vetoed H.R. 3934, an act to authorize the board of supervisors of Maricopa County, Arizona to issue certain bonds in aid of the construction of a certain railroad. No override attempt made.
7. July 9, 1890: Vetoed H.R. 5974, an act to extend time of payment to purchasers of land of the Omaha Tribe of Indians in Nebraska, and for other purposes. No override attempt made.
8. September 30, 1890: Vetoed H.J. Res. 39, a joint resolution declaring the retirement of Captain Charles B. Stivers, of the United States Army, valid, and that he be entitled as such retired officer to his pay. No override attempt made.
9. October 1, 1890: Vetoed S. 473, an act for the relief of the Portland Company of Portland, Maine. No override attempt made.
10. October 1, 1890: Vetoed S. 1857, an act for the relief of Charles P. Chouteau, survivor of Chouteau, Harrison & Valle. No override attempt made.
11. October 1, 1890: Vetoed S. 3830, an act to prohibit bookmaking of any kind and pool selling in the District of Columbia for purposes of gaming. No override attempt made.
12. October 6, 1890: Pocket-vetoed S. 117, an act for the relief of Edward H. Leib.
13. October 8, 1890: Pocket-vetoed S. 1552, an act granting a pension to Louise Selden.
14. October 8, 1890: Pocket-vetoed S. 3414, an act granting a pension to James Melvin.
15. October 10, 1890: Pocket-vetoed H.R. 4367, an act for the relief of D.H. Mitchell.
16. October 11, 1890: Pocket-vetoed S. 125, an act for the relief of Reaney, Son & Archbold.
17. October 11, 1890: Pocket-vetoed S. 270, an act for the relief of the assignees of John Roach, deceased.
18. October 11, 1890: Pocket-vetoed S. 968, an act for the relief of Amos L. Allen, survivor of the firm of Larrabee & Allen.
19. October 11, 1890: Pocket-vetoed S. 1187, an act for the relief of the Washington Iron Works, District of Columbia.
20. October 11, 1890: Pocket-vetoed S. 2531, an act granting an increase of pension to Benjamin T. Baker.
21. October 13, 1890: Pocket-vetoed S. 145, an act for the relief of the legal representatives of Henry S. French.
22. October 13, 1890: Pocket-vetoed S. 3721, an act for the relief of A.J. McCreary, administrator of the estate of J.M. Hiatt, deceased, and for other purposes.
23. December 24, 1890: Vetoed S. 544, an act for the erection of a building at Bar Harbor, Maine. No override attempt made.
24. January 26, 1891: Vetoed H.R. 12365, an act to authorize Oklahoma City, in Oklahoma Territory, to issue bonds to provide a right-of-way for the Choctaw Coal & Railway Company through said city. No override attempt made.
25. February 26, 1891: Vetoed S. 4620, an act to establish the record and pension office in the War Department. No override attempt made.
26. March 2, 1891: Vetoed S. 3270, an act for the relief of the administratrix of the estate of George W. Lawrence. No override attempt made.
27. March 6, 1891: Pocket-vetoed S. 712, an act for the relief of the Stockbridge Tribe of Indians, in the State of Wisconsin.
28. March 6, 1891: Pocket-vetoed S. 4749, an act for the relief of the Portland Co., of Portland, Maine.
29. March 12, 1891: Pocket-vetoed S. 395, an act for the relief of Sarah K. McLean, widow of the late Lt. Col. Nathaniel H. McLean.
30. March 13, 1891: Pocket-vetoed H.R. 174, an act to create the eastern division of the northern Federal judicial district of Georgia.
31. March 13, 1891: Pocket-vetoed H.R. 2001, an act to remove the charge of desertion against Gardner Dodge.
32. March 13, 1891: Pocket-vetoed H.R. 3308, an act to open and set aside an order of the Court of Claims canceling a portion of a judgement against the United States, remitted through mistake as to the facts in regard to the same by claimant to the United States, and to refer the matter to the Court of Claims for such further action as said court shall find to be just and equitable.
33. March 13, 1891: Pocket-vetoed H.R. 4187, an act for the correction of the record of Captain William P. Hall, United States Army.
34. March 13, 1891: Pocket-vetoed H.R. 6170, an act directing the issuance of an honorable discharge to David L. Lockerby, late of Company A, Ninety-sixth New York Volunteers.
35. March 13, 1891: Pocket-vetoed H.R. 9313, an act granting a pension to Mary D. McChesney.
36. March 13, 1891: Pocket-vetoed H.R. 12643, an act to remove the charge of desertion from the record of Michael Mahan.
37. July 19, 1892: Vetoed S. 2729, an act to amend an act entitled "An act to establish circuit courts of appeals, and to define and regulate in certain cases the jurisdiction of the courts of the United States, and for other purposes." No override attempt made.
38. July 29, 1892: Vetoed S. 1958, an act to submit to the Court of Claims the title of William McGarrahan to the Rancho Panoche Grande, in the State of California, and for other purposes. Override attempt failed in Senate on January 17, 1893, 29–18 (32 votes needed).
39. August 3, 1892: Vetoed S. 1111, an act to amend the Act of Congress approved March 3, 1887, entitled "An act to provide for the bringing of suits against the Government of the United States." No override attempt made.
40. August 17, 1892: Pocket-vetoed H.R. 9657, an act to provide for lowering the height of a bridge proposed to be constructed across the Ohio River, between Cincinnati, Ohio, and Covington, Kentucky, by the Cincinnati & Covington Rapid Transit Bridge Company.
41. December 27, 1892: Pocket-vetoed S. 2275, an act for the relief of purchasers of timber and stone lands under the act of June 3, 1878.
42. February 27, 1893: Vetoed H.R. 9612, an act to prescribe the number of district attorneys and marshals in the judicial districts of the State of Alabama. Overridden by House on March 2, 1893, 184–55 (160 votes needed). Overridden by Senate on March 3, 1893, 58–1 (40 votes needed). Enacted over the president's veto (27 Stat. 745).
43. March 15, 1893: Pocket-vetoed H.R. 2122, an act for the relief of Cumberland Female College of McMinnville, Tennessee.
44. March 15, 1893: Pocket-vetoed H.R. 9956, an act to incorporate the Washington, Burnt Mills & Sandy Spring Railway Company.

=== William McKinley ===
42 vetoes (six regular vetoes and 36 pocket vetoes).

1. May 19, 1898: Vetoed H.R. 2219, an act for the relief of the administrators of Isaac P. Tice, deceased, and others. Override attempt failed in House on May 16, 1898, 0–189 (126 votes needed).
2. July 20, 1898: Pocket-vetoed S. 4847, an act to provide an American register for the steamer Titania.
3. January 19, 1899: Vetoed S. 708, an act for the relief of Albert E. Redstone. No override attempt made.
4. March 7, 1899: Pocket-vetoed H.R. 8997, an act for the relief of John W. Brisbois.
5. March 11, 1899: Pocket-vetoed H.R. 8578, an act granting an increase of pension to George W. Reisinger.
6. March 11, 1899: Pocket-vetoed H.R. 9344, an act granting an increase of pension to John Begley.
7. March 16, 1899: Pocket-vetoed H.J. Res. 384, a joint resolution authorizing the acceptance of the cession by the Commonwealth of Massachusetts to the United States of a certain tract of land in Boston Harbor.
8. May 3, 1900: Vetoed H.R. 4001, an act authorizing the adjustment of rights of settlers on the Navajo Indian Reservation, Territory of Arizona. No override attempt made.
9. May 16, 1900: Vetoed H.R. 1454, an act for the relief of William L. Orr. No override attempt made.
10. June 16, 1900: Pocket-vetoed H.R. 8815, an act to amend chapter 4, Title XIII, of the Revised Statutes of the United States, relating to district courts.
11. June 19, 1900: Pocket-vetoed S. 2581, an act to incorporate the National White Cross of America, and for other purposes.
12. March 1, 1901: Vetoed H.R. 3204, an act to refer certain claims for Indian depredations to the Court of Claims. No override attempt made.
13. March 2, 1901: Vetoed H.R. 321, an act for the relief of the legal representatives of Samuel Tewksbury. No override attempt made.
14. March 2, 1901: Pocket-vetoed H.R. 7243, an act to remove the charge of desertion from the military record of Silas Nicholson.
15. March 3, 1901: Pocket-vetoed H.R. 5599, an act granting an honorable discharge to James L. Proctor.
16. March 5, 1901: Pocket-vetoed H.R. 2464, an act to remove the charge of desertion from the military record of Nicholas Swingle.
17. March 5, 1901: Pocket-vetoed H.R. 3825, an act to grant an honorable discharge to Frederick A. Noeller.
18. March 5, 1901: Pocket-vetoed H.R. 7602, an act to correct the military record of Palmer G. Percy.
19. March 7, 1901: Pocket-vetoed H.R. 2430, an act for the relief of Jacob L. Hangar, alias William T. Graham.
20. March 9, 1901: Pocket-vetoed H.R. 12860, an act for the relief of Isaiah Lightner, W.H. Winterbottom, and Gustave Mollin.
21. March 11, 1901: Pocket-vetoed H.R. 5533, an act to correct the military record of William T. Pratt.
22. March 11, 1901: Pocket-vetoed H.R. 6146, an act for the relief of the administrators of William B. Moses, deceased, and Lebbeus H. Rogers.
23. March 12, 1901: Pocket-vetoed S. 76, an act for the relief of the University of Kansas.
24. March 12, 1901: Pocket-vetoed S. 1673, an act to grant an honorable discharge from the military service to Charles H. Hawley.
25. March 12, 1901: Pocket-vetoed S. 3554, an act for the relief of W.T. Scott and others.
26. March 13, 1901: Pocket-vetoed H.R. 1136, an act for the relief of parties for property taken from them by military forces of the United States.
27. March 13, 1901: Pocket-vetoed H.R. 1860, an act for the relief of the trustees of Carson-Newman College, at Mossycreek, Tennessee.
28. March 14, 1901: Pocket-vetoed H.R. 427, an act for the relief of heirs of Mrs. Tellisse W. Wilson.
29. March 14, 1901: Pocket-vetoed H.R. 628, an act for the relief of Hamilton M. Sailors.
30. March 14, 1901: Pocket-vetoed H.R. 636, an act for the relief of St. John's Lodge, Ancient Free and Accepted Masons, No. 3, of New Bern, North Carolina.
31. March 14, 1901: Pocket-vetoed H.R. 1959, an act for the relief of the heirs of George W. Saulpaw.
32. March 14, 1901: Pocket-vetoed H.R. 2294, an act for the relief of J.V. Davis, of Alexandria, Virginia.
33. March 14, 1901: Pocket-vetoed H.R. 2472, an act to correct the military record of John H. Finfrock.
34. March 14, 1901: Pocket-vetoed H.R. 2617, an act for the relief of the legal representatives of Edwin De Leon, deceased, for $8,000 claimed to be due for judicial service.
35. March 14, 1901: Pocket-vetoed H.R. 2619, an act for the relief of Agnes and Maria De Leon.
36. March 14, 1901: Pocket-vetoed H.R. 4204, an act for the correction of the military record of George A. Winslow.
37. March 14, 1901: Pocket-vetoed H.R. 4853, an act for the relief of heirs-at-law of Edward N. Oldmixon.
38. March 14, 1901: Pocket-vetoed H.R. 6591, an act for the relief of Austin A. Yates.
39. March 14, 1901: Pocket-vetoed H.R. 7603, an act to correct the military record of James A. Somerville.
40. March 14, 1901: Pocket-vetoed H.R. 8270, an act for the relief of Herman Von Marsdorf, late a Lieutenant of Company D, First Maryland Cavalry.
41. March 14, 1901: Pocket-vetoed H.R. 11828, an act to remove the charge of desertion from military record of Charles F. Kramer.
42. March 15, 1901: Pocket-vetoed S. 4956, an act to grant the Knoxville Power Company the right to dam the Tennessee River at or near Knoxville, Tennessee.

=== Theodore Roosevelt ===
82 vetoes (42 regular vetoes and 40 pocket vetoes). One was overridden.

1. March 11, 1902: Vetoed S. 1258, an act to remove the charge of desertion from naval record of John Glass. No override attempt made.
2. March 15, 1902: Vetoed S. 24, an act for the relief of James W. Howell. No override attempt made.
3. March 15, 1902: Vetoed S. 336, an act to grant honorable discharge from the military service to Charles H. Hawley. No override attempt made.
4. March 28, 1902: Vetoed H.R. 3762, an act for the relief of Emanuel Klauser. No override attempt made.
5. April 16, 1902: Vetoed H.R. 5761, an act granting a pension to Thomas F. Walter. No override attempt made.
6. April 23, 1902: Vetoed S. 4363, an act granting the Central Arizona Railway Company right-of-way for railroad purposes through San Francisco Mountains Forest Reserve. No override attempt made.
7. May 15, 1902: Vetoed H.R. 4446, an act for the relief of Harry C. Mix. No override attempt made.
8. June 23, 1902: Vetoed H.R. 3309, an act to remove the charge of desertion against Ephraim H. Gallion. No override attempt made.
9. February 5, 1903: Vetoed H.R. 14275, an act to provide for the appointment of a district judge for the western judicial district of South Carolina, and for other purposes. No override attempt made.
10. February 11, 1903: Vetoed S. 4308, an act for the relief of Katie A. Nolan. No override attempt made.
11. February 21, 1903: Vetoed S. 1115, an act for the relief of Francis S. Davidson, late first lieutenant, Ninth United States Cavalry. No override attempt made.
12. February 25, 1903: Vetoed H.R. 10095, an act for the relief of Levi L. Reed. No override attempt made.
13. March 3, 1903: Vetoed H.R. 9632, an act for the allowance of claims of certain citizens of Virginia for damages to their property incident to the encampment at Nanassas and march from Camp Alger to Thoroughfare Gap, Virginia, as recommended by a board of officers appointed for the consideration of claims for damages to property by volunteer soldiers during the war with Spain. No override attempt made.
14. March 3, 1903: Vetoed H.R. 14051, an act granting the consent of Congress to N.F. Thompson and others to erect a dam and power stations at Muscle Shoals, Alabama. No override attempt made.
15. March 3, 1903: Vetoed S. 1168, an act authorizing the appointment of Edward L. Bailey, as captain of infantry, United States Army and to place him on the retired list. No override attempt made.
16. March 11, 1903: Pocket-vetoed H.R. 5907, an act granting a pension to David S. Taylor.
17. March 11, 1903: Pocket-vetoed H.R. 15573, an act granting a pension to Cynthia Thomas.
18. March 11, 1903: Pocket-vetoed H.R. 16361, an act granting an increase of pension to John W. Chancellor.
19. March 11, 1903: Pocket-vetoed H.R. 16445, an act granting an increase of pension to Luke Madden, alias John E. McDonald.
20. March 13, 1903: Pocket-vetoed H.R. 2199, an act to remove the charge of desertion from the military record of Jonas Albert.
21. March 15, 1903: Pocket-vetoed S. 4641, an act for the relief of Benjamin Franklin Handforth.
22. March 15, 1905: Pocket-vetoed H.R. 11204, an act to ratify and confirm a lease made by the Seneca Nation of New York Indians to John Quilter.
23. March 16, 1905: Pocket-vetoed S. 5108, an act to amend an act for the prevention of smoke in the District of Columbia, and for other purposes, approved February 2, 1899.
24. March 12, 1906: Vetoed H.R. 10080, an act to provide for sittings of the United States circuit and district courts of the southern district of Florida at the city of Miami, in said district. No override attempt made.
25. March 22, 1906: Vetoed H.R. 8977, an act to create a new division of the western judicial district of Texas and to provide for terms of court at Del Rio, Texas, and for a clerk for said court, and for other purposes. No override attempt made.
26. April 2, 1906: Vetoed H.R. 15521, an act establishing regular terms of the United States circuit and district courts of the northern district of California at Eureka, California. No override attempt made.
27. April 16, 1906: Vetoed H.R. 20, an act to change and fix the time for holding the circuit and district courts of the United States for the middle district of Tennessee, in the southern division of the eastern district of Tennessee at Chattanooga, and the northeastern division of the eastern division of Tennessee at Greenville, and for other purposes. No override attempt made.
28. May 10, 1906: Vetoed S. 5514, an act to amend section 4472 of the Revised Statutes, relating to the carrying of dangerous articles on passenger steamers. No override attempt made.
29. May 16, 1906: Vetoed S. 3454, an act granting an increase of pension to William Wilson. No override attempt made.
30. June 29, 1906: Vetoed H.R. 10133, an act to provide for the annual pro rata distribution of annuities of the Sac and Fox Indians of the Mississippi between the two branches of the tribe, and to adjust the existing claims between the two branches as to said annuities. No override attempt made.
31. June 29, 1906: Vetoed H.R. 19681, an act to survey and allot the lands embraced within the limits of the Blackfeet Indian Reservation, in the State of Montana, and to open the surplus lands to settlement. No override attempt made.
32. July 11, 1906: Pocket-vetoed H.R. 7226, an act for the relief of Patrick Conlin.
33. July 12, 1906: Pocket-vetoed H.R. 12080, an act granting to the Siletz Power and Manufacturing Co. a right-of-way for water ditch or canal through the Siletz Indian Reservation, in Oregon.
34. July 12, 1906: Pocket-vetoed H.R. 15673, an act for the relief of Harry A. Young.
35. July 12, 1906: Pocket-vetoed S. 4197, an act authorizing and directing the Secretary of the Treasury to enter on the roll of Captain Orlando Humason's Company B, First Oregon Mounted Volunteers, the name of Hezekiah Davis.
36. July 12, 1906: Pocket-vetoed S. 4965, an act authorizing the appointment of Harold L. Jackson, a captain on the retired list of the Army, as a major on the retired list of the Army.
37. July 12, 1906: Pocket-vetoed S. 6355, an act concerning licensed officers of vessels.
38. July 13, 1906: Pocket-vetoed S. 1812, an act for the relief of Lieut. James M. Pickrell, United States Navy, retired.
39. July 13, 1906: Pocket-vetoed S. 2188, an act granting to the city of Durango, in the State of Colorado, certain lands therein described for water reservoirs.
40. July 13, 1906: Pocket-vetoed S. 4774, an act relating to the movements and anchorage of vessels in Hampton Roads, the Harbors of Norfolk and Newport News, and adjacent waters, in the State of Virginia.
41. December 20, 1906: Vetoed S. 6197, an act granting increase of pension to Charles E. Henry. No override attempt made.
42. February 4, 1907: Vetoed S. 2578, an act for the relief of Alice Stafford, administratrix of the estate of Captain Stephen R. Stafford. No override attempt made.
43. February 4, 1907: Vetoed S. 5531, an act for the relief of Francisco Krebs. No override attempt made.
44. February 26, 1907: Vetoed H.R. 22367, an act for the relief of Patrick Conlin. No override attempt made.
45. February 26, 1907: Vetoed H.R. 24989, an act to provide for the commutation of town-site purposes of homestead entries in certain portions of Oklahoma. No override attempt made.
46. February 27, 1907: Vetoed H.R. 2326, an act for the relief of J.W. Bauer and others. No override attempt made.
47. March 4, 1907: Vetoed H.R. 13122, an act to correct the military record of John Allen. No override attempt made.
48. March 7, 1907: Pocket-vetoed H.R. 18854, an act providing for sittings of the United States circuit and district courts of the southern district of Ohio at the city of Dayton, in said district.
49. March 13, 1907: Pocket-vetoed H.R. 3498, an act for the relief of Stephen M. Honeycutt.
50. March 15, 1907: Pocket-vetoed H.R. 17415, an act to authorize the assignee of coal-land locations to make entry under the coal-land laws applicable to Alaska.
51. March 15, 1907: Pocket-vetoed H.R. 19500, an act for the relief of Indian Traders Marion Wescott, F.F. Green, and J.A. Leige, assignee of Joseph F. Gauthier, a Menominee Indian trader, with the Menominee Indians of Wisconsin.
52. March 15, 1907: Pocket-vetoed S. 4964, an act for the relief of Thomas F. Walter.
53. March 15, 1907: Pocket-vetoed S. 8540, an act to ratify a certain lease with the Seneca Nation of Indians.
54. April 7, 1908: Vetoed H.R. 4763, an act transferring Commander William Wilmot White from retired list to active list of Navy. Override attempt failed in House on April 8, 1908, 0–258 (172 votes needed).
55. April 7, 1908: Vetoed H.R. 16621, an act permitting the building of a dam across the Savannah River at Cherokee Shoals. No override attempt made.
56. April 13, 1908: Vetoed H.R. 15444, an act extending the time for construction of a dam across the Rainy River. Overridden by House on May 23, 1908, 240–5 (164 votes needed). Overridden by Senate on May 23, 1908, 49–0 (33 votes needed). Enacted as Pub. L. 60–138 over the president's veto.
57. December 19, 1908: Vetoed S.J. Res. 78, a joint resolution establishing the boundary line between the States of Colorado and Oklahoma and the Territory of New Mexico. No override attempt made.
58. January 15, 1909: Vetoed H.R. 17707, an act to authorize William H. Standish to construct a dam across James River, in Stone County, Missouri, and divert a portion of its waters through a tunnel into the said river again to create electric power. No override attempt made.
59. January 27, 1909: Vetoed H.R. 15098, an act to correct the military record of John H. Layne. No override attempt made.
60. January 28, 1909: Vetoed S. 653, an act to authorize commissions to issue in the cases of officers of the Army, Navy, Marine Corps, and Revenue Cutter Service, retired with increased rank. No override attempt made.
61. February 5, 1909: Vetoed H.R. 16954, an act to provide for the Thirteenth and subsequent decennial censuses. No override attempt made.
62. February 8, 1909: Vetoed H.R. 16927, an act for the relief of Lieutenant Commander Kenneth McAlpine. No override attempt made.
63. February 10, 1909: Vetoed S. 5473, an act amending section 1998 of the Revised Statutes of the United States and to authorize the Secretary of the Navy in certain cases to mitigate or remit the loss of rights of citizenship imposed by law upon deserters from naval service. No override attempt made.
64. February 26, 1909: Vetoed H.R. 7157, an act for the relief of W.P. Dukes, postmaster at Rowesville, South Carolina. No override attempt made.
65. February 26, 1909: Vetoed H.R. 19762, an act to reimburse the postmaster at Sandborn, Indiana. No override attempt made.
66. March 6, 1909: Pocket-vetoed H.R. 13712, an act for the relief of the legal representatives of Sarah J. Montgomery, deceased.
67. March 7, 1909: Pocket-vetoed H.R. 1072, an act for the relief of Mary A. Coulson, executrix of Sewell Coulson, deceased.
68. March 7, 1909: Pocket-vetoed H.R. 12499, an act for the relief of Clarence Frederick Chapman, United States Navy.
69. March 7, 1909: Pocket-vetoed H.R. 13928, an act for the relief of P. H. McDonough, of Bardstown, Kentucky.
70. March 14, 1909: Pocket-vetoed H.R. 4521, an act to reorganize and enlist the members of the United States Naval Academy Band.
71. March 16, 1909: Pocket-vetoed S. 3164, an act to correct the military record of Paul Sinock.
72. March 16, 1909: Pocket-vetoed S. 3526, an act to amend section 876 of the Revised Statutes, relating to subpoenas.
73. March 16, 1909: Pocket-vetoed S. 4426, an act for the relief of Thomas C. Clark.
74. March 16, 1909: Pocket-vetoed S. 6852, an act for the relief of Walter F. Rogers, executor of the estate of Sarah Edwards, late owner of lot No. 116, square No. 628, Washington, D.C., with regard to assessment and payment of damages on account of changes of grade due to construction of the Union Station, District of Columbia.
75. March 16, 1909: Pocket-vetoed S. 7859, an act for the relief of Parsey O. Burrough.
76. March 16, 1909: Pocket-vetoed S. 8429, an act to refund certain tonnage taxes and light duties levied on the steamship Montara without register.
77. March 16, 1909: Pocket-vetoed S. 8588, an act to amend an act entitled, "An act for the relief of Dewitt Eastman," approved January 8, 1909.
78. March 16, 1909: Pocket-vetoed S. 8839, an act for the removal of restrictions from the third selection or allotment of lands selected by William J. Scott, a minor member of the Osage Tribe of Indians, and for other purposes.
79. March 16, 1909: Pocket-vetoed S. 9402, an act for the relief of John H. Layne.
80. March 17, 1909: Pocket-vetoed H.R. 6183, an act granting to the Siletz Power & Manufacturing Company a right of way for a water ditch or canal through the Siletz Indian Reservation, in Oregon.
81. March 17, 1909: Pocket-vetoed H.R. 16696, an act for the relief of the estate of Peter McEnery, deceased.

=== Woodrow Wilson ===
Thirty-three regular vetoes, eleven pocket vetoes. Six were overridden.

Wilson wrote: "The President is no greater than his prerogative of veto makes him; he is, in other words, powerful rather as a branch of the legislature than as the titular head of the Executive."

Some of Wilson's vetoes include:

1. October 27, 1919: Vetoed the Volstead Act, but his veto was overridden by Congress.
2. December 14, 1916: Vetoed the Immigration Act of 1917, but his veto was overridden by Congress.

=== Warren Harding ===
Harding vetoed the Soldiers' Adjusted Compensation Act (soldiers' bonus) on September 19, 1922, arguing the country could not afford the cost during the postwar recession. Congress failed, by four votes, to override his veto.

=== Calvin Coolidge ===
Coolidge vetoed the McNary–Haugen Farm Relief Bill because he thought its cost was too high.

=== Herbert Hoover ===
- May 11, 1932 – Vetoed a bill to amend the Tariff Act of 1930 and for other purposes. The House of Representatives sustained the veto.

=== Franklin D. Roosevelt ===
635 vetoes.

Franklin D. Roosevelt vetoed more bills than any other president in history. This is partly because of the many new ideas for solutions to the problems caused by the Great Depression and World War II, and partly because he served three full terms (Roosevelt died roughly three months into his fourth term). Grover Cleveland vetoed more bills per term.

=== Harry S. Truman ===
180 regular vetoes, 70 pocket vetoes.

Congress overrode 12 of Truman's vetoes. One of the most notable was the Taft–Hartley Act, which weakened labor unions. Another was the McCarran Internal Security Act, which established the Subversive Activities Control Board to investigate suspected communist and/or fascist sympathizers.

=== Dwight Eisenhower ===
President Eisenhower had 181 vetoes, 73 of them regular legislative vetoes and 108 pocket vetoes. Two of these vetoes were overridden, the Postal and Federal Employees' Salary Increase Acts of 1960 and the Public works appropriations for 1960 fiscal year.

=== Lyndon B. Johnson ===
Sixteen regular vetoes, fourteen pocket vetoes. None were overridden.

Like President Kennedy before him, President Johnson made no public veto threats.

1. December 30, 1963: Pocket vetoed H.R. 2513, A bill to amend the Tariff Act of 1930. The bill was presented to the president on December 19, 1963.
2. December 30, 1963: Pocket vetoed H.R. 4505, A bill to confer jurisdiction on the Court of Claims to entertain, hear, and determine a motion for a new trial on the claim of Robert Alexander. The bill was presented to the president on December 21, 1963.
3. March 23, 1964: Vetoed H.R. 1761, A bill to confer jurisdiction on the Court of Claims to hear, determine, and render judgment upon the claim of R. Gordon Finney, Jr. No override attempt made.
4. August 6, 1964: Vetoed H.R. 4501, A bill for the relief of Anthony F. Bernardo and Ambrose A. Cerrito. No override attempt made.
5. August 11, 1964: Vetoed H.R. 2262, A bill for the relief of Catalina Properties, Incorporated. No override attempt made.
6. August 31, 1964: Pocket vetoed H.R. 6883, A bill for the relief of the estate of Eileen G. Foster. The bill was presented to the president on August 14, 1964. The pocket veto occurred during a recess from August 21, 1964, until August 31, 1964.
7. September 1, 1964: Vetoed H.R. 7132, A bill for the relief of Wetsel-Oviatt Lumber Co., Inc., Omo Ranch, El Dorado County, California. No override attempt made.
8. October 3, 1964: Pocket vetoed H.R. 1851, A bill for the relief of Chester A. Brothers and Anna Brothers, his wife.
9. June 5, 1965: Vetoed S. 327, A bill to provide assistance to the States of California, Oregon, Washington, Nevada, and Idaho for the re-construction of areas damaged by recent floods and high waters. No override attempt made.
10. June 14, 1965: Vetoed H.R. 1867, A bill for the relief of Daniel Walter Miles. No override attempt made.
11. June 26, 1965: Vetoed H.R. 2166, A bill for the relief of Staiman Bros.-Simon Wrecking Company. No override attempt made.
12. August 21, 1965: Vetoed H.R. 8439, A bill to authorize certain construction at military installations, and for other purposes. No override attempt made.
13. September 10, 1965: Vetoed H.R. 3329, A bill to incorporate the Youth Councils on Civic Affairs, and for other purposes. No override attempt made.
14. October 4, 1965: Vetoed H.R. 5902, A bill for the relief of Cecil Graham. No override attempt made.
15. October 20, 1965: Vetoed H.R. 1384, A bill for the relief of Theodore Zissu. No override attempt made.
16. July 19, 1966: Vetoed H.R. 2035, A bill to provide for cost-of-living adjustments in star route contract prices. No override attempt made.
17. September 12, 1966: Vetoed H.R. 6926, A bill to strengthen the financial condition of the Employees' Life Insurance Fund created by the Federal Employees' Group Life Insurance Act, to provide certain adjustments in amounts of group life and group accidental death and dismemberment insurance under such Act, and for other purposes. No override attempt made.
18. October 10, 1966: Vetoed H.R. 7546, A bill for the relief of Gilmour C. MacDonald, colonel, U.S. Air Force (retired). No override attempt made.
19. October 22, 1966: Pocket vetoed S. 1674, A bill to authorize the Secretary of the Interior to make disposition of geothermal resources, and for other purposes. The bill was presented to the president on November 2, 1966.
20. October 22, 1966: Pocket vetoed H.R. 3901, A bill for the relief of Miss Elisabeth von Oberndorff. The bill was presented to the president on October 28, 1966.
21. October 22, 1966: Pocket vetoed H.R. 5688, A bill relating to crime and criminal procedure in the District of Columbia. The bill was presented to the president on October 25, 1966.
22. October 22, 1966: Pocket vetoed H.R. 13955, A bill to establish the past and present location of a certain portion of the Colorado River for certain purposes. The bill was presented to the president on October 25, 1966.
23. August 12, 1967: Vetoed H.R. 11089, An act to amend Title 5, United States Code, to provide additional group life insurance and accidental death and dismemberment insurance for Federal employees, and to strengthen the financial condition of the Employees' Life Insurance Fund. No override attempt made.
24. December 8, 1967: Vetoed H.R. 162, A bill to grant the masters of certain U.S. vessels a lien on those vessels for their wages and for certain disbursements. No override attempt made.
25. December 15, 1967: Pocket vetoed H.R. 1670, A bill for the relief of Dr. George H. Edler. The bill was presented to the president on December 12, 1967
26. September 4, 1968, Pocket vetoed H.R. 10915, A bill to amend section 202 of the Agricultural Act of 1956. The bill was presented to the president on July 31, 1968. The pocket veto occurred during a recess from August 2, 1968, until September 4, 1968.
27. October 14, 1968: Pocket vetoed H.R. 159, A bill to amend Title II of the Merchant Marine Act, 1936, to create an independent Federal Maritime Administration, and for other purposes. The bill was presented to the president on October 18, 1968.
28. October 14, 1968: Pocket vetoed H.R. 4939, A bill for the relief of Joseph H. Bonduki. The bill was presented to the president on October 14, 1968.
29. October 14, 1968: Pocket vetoed H.R. 5677, A bill for the relief of Robert L. Miller and Mildred M. Miller. The bill was presented to the president on October 12, 1968.
30. October 14, 1968: Pocket vetoed H.R. 10256, A bill to render the assertion of land claims by the United States based upon accretion or avulsion subject to legal and equitable defense to which private persons asserting such claims would be subject. The bill was presented to the president on October 14, 1968.

=== Richard Nixon ===
Twenty-six regular vetoes, seventeen pocket vetoes. Seven were overridden. There were no vetoes in the first session of the Ninety-first Congress.

- December 10, 1971 – Vetoed the Comprehensive Child Development Act.
- October 17, 1972 – Veto of the Clean Water Act was overridden by Congress (date is enactment date).
- November 7, 1973 – Veto of the War Powers Act of 1973 was overridden in Congress (date is enactment date).
- January 4, 1974 – Pocket vetoed a bill to provide federal funds for local purchases of buses for mass transportation.
- March 6, 1974 – Vetoed an emergency energy bill

=== Gerald Ford ===
Forty eight regular vetoes, eighteen pocket vetoes. Twelve were overridden.

- October 29, 1974 – Veto of H.R. 6624 Private Relief Bill for Burt, Pope and Kennedy (Miami Herald Reporters)

This bill would have provided for payment, "as a gratuity," of $45,482 to Mr. Burt and for similar payments of $36,750 each to the widow and son of Douglas E. Kennedy for injuries and other damages Mr. Burt and Mr. Kennedy sustained as a result of gunshot wounds inflicted by U.S. military personnel in the Dominican Republic in 1965.

=== Jimmy Carter ===
- 1977: Vetoed Department of Energy authorization bill.
- 1978: Vetoed bill to reduce federal firefighters' work week.

Congress overrode two of Carter's vetoes. Not since 1952 had a Congress controlled by the president's own party overridden a veto. On June 5, 1980, Carter vetoed a bill that repealed a crude oil import fee of $4.62 per barrel. The same day, the House voted 335–34 to override Carter's veto. The Senate followed suit the next day by 68 votes to 10. Carter's own party (the Democrats) had a 59-seat majority (276–157) in the House, and an eight-seat majority (58–41) in the Senate. In August 1980, Congress overrode his veto of a veterans' health care bill, by votes of 401–5 in the House, and 85–0 in the Senate.

=== Ronald Reagan ===
Thirty-nine normal vetoes, thirty-nine pocket vetoes. Nine were overridden. The following is an incomplete list of Reagan's vetoes.

1. November 23, 1981: Vetoed H.J.Res. 357, Continuing Appropriations for fiscal year 1982. No override attempt made.
2. December 30, 1981: Pocket vetoed H.R. 4353, To amend the Federal Bankruptcies Act of 1978.
3. March 20, 1982: Vetoed S. 1503, Standby Petroleum Allocation Act of 1982. Override attempt failed in Senate, 58–36 (63 needed).
4. June 1, 1982: Vetoed H.R. 5118, Southern Arizona Water Rights Settlement Act of 1982. No override attempt made.
5. June 24, 1982: Vetoed H.R. 5922, Urgent Supplemental Appropriations Act, 1982. Override attempt failed in House, 253–151 (270 needed).
6. June 25, 1982: Vetoed H.R. 6682, Urgent Supplemental Appropriations Act, 1982. Override attempt failed in House, 242–169 (274 needed).
7. July 8, 1982: Vetoed H.R. 6198, A bill to amend the manufacturing clause of the copyright law. Overridden by House, 324–86 (274 needed). Overridden by Senate, 84–9 (62 needed), and enacted as Pub. L. 97–215 over the president's veto.
8. August 28, 1982: Vetoed H.R. 6863, Supplemental Appropriations Act, 1982. Overridden by House, 301–117 (279 needed). Overridden by Senate, 60–30 (60 needed), and enacted as Pub. L. 97–257 over the president's veto.
9. October 15, 1982: Vetoed H.R. 1371, A bill to amend section 12 of the Contract Disputes Act of 1978. No override attempt made.
10. October 22, 1982: Vetoed S. 2577, Environmental Research, Development, and Demonstration Act of 1983. No override attempt made.
11. January 3, 1983: Pocket vetoed S. 2623, A bill to amend and extend the Tribally Controlled Community College Assistance Act of 1978, and for other purposes.
12. January 4, 1983: Pocket vetoed H.R. 5858, A bill for the relief of Mocatta & Goldsmid, Ltd., Sharps, Pixley & Co., Ltd., and Primary Metal and Mineral Corp (private bill).
13. January 14, 1983: Pocket vetoed H.R. 3963, A bill to amend the Contract Services for Drug Dependent Federal Offenders Act of 1978.
14. January 14, 1983: Pocket vetoed H.R. 9, Florida Wilderness Act of 1982.
15. January 14, 1983: Pocket vetoed H.R. 7336, A bill to make certain technical amendments to improve implementation of the Education Consolidation and Improvement Act of 1981.
16. December 17, 1985: Vetoed H.R. 1562, Textile and Apparel Trade Enforcement Act of 1985. Override attempt failed in House, 276–149 (284 needed).
17. September 26, 1986: Vetoed, H.R. 4868, Comprehensive Anti-Apartheid Act. Overridden by House, 292–133 (284 needed). Overridden by Senate, 73–24 (65 needed), and enacted as Pub. L. 99–440 over the president's veto.
18. March 27, 1987: Vetoed, H.R. 2, Surface Transportation and Uniform Relocation Assistance Act. Overridden by House, 350-73 (282 needed). Overridden by Senate, 67-33 (67 needed), and enacted as Pub. L. 100–17 over the president's veto.
19. March 16, 1988: Vetoed S. 557, Civil Rights Restoration Act of 1987. Overridden by House, 313–83 (264 needed). Overridden by Senate, 78–21 (66 needed), and enacted as Pub. L. 100–259 over the president's veto.

=== George H. W. Bush ===
Twenty-nine vetoes, fifteen pocket vetoes. One was overridden.

1. June 13, 1989: Vetoed H.R. 2, Fair Labor Standards Amendments of 1989. Override attempt failed in House, 247–178 (284 needed).
2. July 31, 1989: Vetoed S.J.Res. 113, Prohibiting the export of technology, defense articles, and defense services to codevelop or coproduce the FS-X aircraft with Japan. Override attempt failed in Senate, 66–34 (67 needed).
  August 16, 1989: Disputed pocket veto of H.J.Res. 390, Waiving certain enrollment requirements with respect to the bill H.R. 1278.
3. October 21, 1989: Vetoed H.R. 2990, Departments of Labor, Health and Human Services, and Education, and Related Agencies Appropriations Act, 1990. Override attempt failed in House, 231–191 (282 needed).
4. October 27, 1989: Vetoed H.R. 3026, District of Columbia Appropriations Act, 1990. No override attempt made.
5. November 19, 1989: Vetoed H.R. 2939, Foreign Operations, Export Financing, and Related Programs Appropriations Act, 1990. No override attempt made.
6. November 20, 1989: Vetoed H.R. 3610, District of Columbia Appropriations Act, 1990. No override attempt made.
7. November 21, 1989: Vetoed H.R. 1231, To establish a commission to investigate and report respecting the dispute between Eastern Airlines and its collective bargaining units, and for other purposes. Override attempt failed in House, 261–160 (281 needed).
8. November 21, 1989: Vetoed H.R. 1487, Foreign Relations Authorization Act, Fiscal Years 1990 and 1991. No override attempt made.
9. November 30, 1989: Vetoed (or in the alternative pocket vetoed) H.R. 2712, Emergency Chinese Immigration Relief Act of 1989. Overridden by House, 390–25 (277 needed). Override attempt failed in Senate, 62–37 (66 needed).
10. May 24, 1990: Vetoed H.R. 2364, Amtrak Reauthorization and Improvement Act of 1990. Overridden by House, 294–123 (278 needed). Override attempt failed in Senate, 64–36 (67 needed).
11. June 15, 1990: Vetoed H.R. 20, Hatch Act Reform Amendments of 1990. Overridden by House, 327–93 (280 needed). Override attempt failed in Senate, 65–35 (67 needed).
12. June 29, 1990: Vetoed H.R. 770, Family and Medical Leave Act of 1990. Override attempt failed in House, 232–195 (285 needed).
13. October 5, 1990: Vetoed H.R. 4328, Textile, Apparel, and Footwear Trade Act of 1990. Override attempt failed in House, 275–152 (285 needed).
14. October 6, 1990: Vetoed H.J.Res. 660, Making further continuing appropriations for the fiscal year 1991, and for other purposes. Override attempt failed in House, 260–138 (266 needed).
15. October 22, 1990: Vetoed S. 2104, Civil Rights Act of 1990. Override attempt failed in Senate, 66–34 (67 needed).
16. November 10, 1990: Pocket vetoed H.R. 4638, Orphan Drug Amendments of 1990.
17. November 17, 1990: Pocket vetoed H.R. 3134, For the relief of Mrs. Joan R. Daronco (private bill).
18. November 17, 1990: Pocket vetoed H.R. 4653, Omnibus Export Amendments Act of 1990.
19. November 21, 1990: Pocket vetoed S. 321, To revise provisions of law that provide a preference to Indians.
20. November 30, 1990: Pocket vetoed S. 2834, Intelligence Authorization Act, Fiscal Year 1991.
21. August 17, 1991: Vetoed H.R. 2699, Making appropriations for the government of the District of Columbia and other activities chargeable in whole or in part against the revenues of said District for the fiscal year ending September 30, 1992, and for other purposes. No override attempt made.
22. October 11, 1991: Vetoed S. 1722, Emergency Unemployment Compensation Act of 1991. Override attempt failed in Senate, 65–35 (67 needed).
23. November 19, 1991: Vetoed H.R. 2707, Departments of Labor, Health and Human Services, and Education, and Related Agencies Appropriations Act, 1992. Override attempt failed in House, 276–156 (288 needed).
  December 20, 1991: Disputed pocket veto of S. 1176, Morris K. Udall Scholarship and Excellence in National Environmental Policy Act.
24. March 2, 1992: Vetoed H.R. 2212, United States–China Act of 1991. Overridden by House, 357–61 (279 needed). Override attempt failed in Senate, 60–38 (66 needed).
25. March 20, 1992: Vetoed H.R. 4210, Tax Fairness and Economic Growth Acceleration Act of 1992. Override attempt failed in House, 211–215 (284 needed).
26. May 9, 1992: Vetoed S. 3, Congressional Campaign Spending Limit and Election Reform Act of 1992. Override attempt failed in Senate, 57–42 (66 needed).
27. June 16, 1992: Vetoed S. 2342, To amend the Act entitled "An Act to provide for the disposition of funds appropriated to pay judgment in favor of the Mississippi Sioux Indians in Indian Claims Commission dockets numbered 142, 359, 360, 361, 362, and 363, and for other purposes", approved October 25, 1972 (86 Stat. 1168 et seq.). No override attempt made.
28. June 23, 1992: Vetoed H.R. 2507, National Institutes of Health Revitalization Amendments of 1992. Override attempt failed in House, 271–156 (285 needed).
29. July 2, 1992: Vetoed S. 250, National Voter Registration Act of 1992. Override attempt failed in Senate, 62–38 (67 needed).
30. September 22, 1992: Vetoed S. 5, Family and Medical Leave Act of 1992. Overridden by Senate, 68–31 (66 needed). Override attempt failed in House, 258–169 (285 needed).
31. September 25, 1992: Vetoed S. 323, Family Planning Amendments Act of 1992. Overridden by Senate, 73–26 (66). Override attempt failed in House, 266–148 (276 needed).
32. September 28, 1992: Vetoed H.R. 5318, United States-China Act of 1992. Overridden by House, 345–74 (280 needed). Override attempt failed in Senate, 59–40 (66 needed).
33. September 30, 1992: Vetoed H.R. 5517, District of Columbia Supplemental Appropriations and Rescissions Act, 1992. No override attempt made.
34. October 3, 1992: Vetoed S. 12, Cable Television Consumer Protection and Competition Act of 1992. Overridden by Senate, 74–25 (66 needed). Overridden by House, 308–114 (282 needed), and enacted as Pub. L. 102–385 over the president's veto.
35. October 21, 1992: Pocket vetoed S. 3095, Jena Band of Choctaws of Louisiana Restoration Act.
36. October 27, 1992: Pocket vetoed H.R. 2859, To direct the Secretary of the Interior to conduct a study of the historical and cultural resources in the vicinity of the city of Lynn, Massachusetts, and make recommendations on the appropriate role of the Federal Government in preserving and interpreting such historical and cultural resources.
37. October 27, 1992: Pocket vetoed H.R. 5021, New River Wild and Scenic Study Act of 1992.
38. October 27, 1992: Pocket vetoed H.R. 5061, To establish Dry Tortugas National Park in the State of Florida.
39. October 27, 1992: Pocket vetoed H.R. 5452, Granting the consent of the Congress to a supplemental compact or agreement between the Commonwealth of Pennsylvania and the State of New Jersey concerning the Delaware River Port Authority.
40. October 28, 1992: Pocket vetoed H.R. 2109, To direct the Secretary of the Interior to conduct a study of the feasibility of including Revere Beach, located in the city of Revere, Massachusetts, in the National Park System.
41. October 30, 1992: Pocket vetoed H.R. 6185, Federal Courts Administration Act of 1992.
42. October 31, 1992: Pocket vetoed H.R. 6138, To amend the Consolidated Farm and Rural Development Act.
43. October 31, 1992: Pocket vetoed S. 3144, Military Health Care Initiatives Act of 1992.
44. November 5, 1992: Pocket vetoed H.R. 11, Revenue Act of 1992.

=== Bill Clinton ===
Thirty-six vetoes, one pocket veto. Two were overridden.

1. June 7, 1995: Vetoed H.R. 1158, Emergency Supplemental Appropriations for Additional Disaster Assistance and Recissions for Fiscal Year 1995. No override attempt made.
2. August 11, 1995: Vetoed S. 21, Bosnia and Herzegovina Self-Defense Act of 1995. No override attempt made.
3. October 3, 1995: Vetoed H.R. 1854, Legislative Branch Appropriations Act, FY 1996. No override attempt made.
4. November 13, 1995: Vetoed H.J.Res. 115, Second Continuing Resolution for fiscal year 1996. No override attempt made.
5. November 13, 1995: Vetoed H.R. 2586, Temporary Increase in the statutory debt limit. No override attempt made.
6. December 6, 1995: Vetoed H.R. 2491, Seven-Year Balanced Budget Reconciliation Act of 1995. No override attempted.
7. December 18, 1995: Vetoed H.R. 1977, Department of the Interior and Related Agencies Appropriations Act, 1996. Override attempt failed in House, 239–177 (278 needed).
8. December 18, 1995: Vetoed H.R. 2099, Department of the Interior and Related Agencies Appropriations Act, 1996. No override attempted.
9. December 19, 1995: Vetoed H.R. 1058, Private Securities Litigation Reform Act of 1995. Overridden by House, 319–100 (280 needed). Overridden by Senate, 68–30 (66 needed), and enacted as Pub. L. 104–67 (text) (PDF) over veto.
10. December 19, 1995: Vetoed H.R. 2076, Departments of Commerce, Justice, and State, the Judiciary, and Related Agencies Appropriations Act, 1996. Override attempt failed in House, 240–159 (266 needed).
11. December 28, 1995: Vetoed H.R. 1530, National Defense Authorization Act for Fiscal Year 1996. Override attempt failed in House, 240–156 (264 needed).
12. January 9, 1996: Vetoed H.R. 4, Personal Responsibility and Work Opportunity Act of 1995. No override attempt made.
13. April 10, 1996: Vetoed H.R. 1833, banning partial birth abortions. Overridden in House, 285–137 (282 needed). Override attempt failed in Senate, 58–40 (66 needed).
14. April 12, 1996: Vetoed H.R. 1561, Foreign Relations Authorization Act, Fiscal Years 1996 and 1997. Override attempt failed in House, 234–188 (282 needed).
15. May 2, 1996: Vetoed H.R. 956, Common Sense Product Liability Legal Reform Act of 1996. Override attempt failed in House, 258–163 (281 needed).
16. July 30, 1996: Vetoed H.R. 743, Teamwork for Employees and Managers Act of 1995. No override attempt made.
17. October 2, 1996: Vetoed H.R. 2909, Silvio O. Conte National Fish and Wildlife Refuge Eminent Domain Prevention Act. No override attempt made.
18. June 9, 1997: Vetoed H.R. 1469, Supplemental Appropriations and Recissions Act, FY 1997. No override attempt made.
19. October 10, 1997: Vetoed H.R. 1122, the second attempted partial birth abortion ban. Overridden by House, 296–132 (286 needed). Override attempt failed in Senate, 64–36 (67 needed).
20. November 13, 1997: Vetoed H.R. 2631, a line item veto override bill. Overridden by House, 347–69 (278 needed). Overridden by Senate, 78–20 (66 needed), and enacted as Pub. L. 105–159 (text) (PDF) over the president's veto.
21. May 20, 1998: Vetoed S. 1502, District of Columbia Student Opportunity Scholarship Act of 1997. No override attempt made.
22. June 23, 1998: Vetoed H.R. 2709, Iran Missile Proliferation Sanctions Act of 1998. No override attempt made.
23. July 21, 1998: Vetoed H.R. 2646, Education Savings and School Excellence Act of 1998. No override attempt made.
24. October 7, 1998: Vetoed H.R. 4101, Agriculture, Rural Development, Food and Drug Administration, and Related Agencies Appropriations Act, 1999. No override attempt made.
25. October 21, 1998: Vetoed H.R. 1757, Foreign Affairs Reform and Restructuring Act of 1998. No override attempt made.
26. September 23, 1999: Vetoed H.R. 2488, Taxpayer Refund and Relief Act of 1999. No override attempt made.
27. September 28, 1999: Vetoed H.R. 2587, District of Columbia Appropriations Act, 2000. No override attempt made.
28. October 18, 1999: Vetoed H.R. 2606, Foreign Operations, Export Financing, and Related Programs Appropriations Act, 2000. No override attempt made.
29. October 25, 1999: Vetoed H.R. 2670, Departments of Commerce, Justice, and State, the Judiciary, and Related Agencies Appropriations Act, 2000. No override attempt made.
30. November 3, 1999: Vetoed H.R. 3064, FY 2000 District of Columbia and Departments of Labor, Health and Human Services, and Education, and Related Agencies appropriations bill. No override attempt made.
31. April 25, 2000: Vetoed S. 1287, Nuclear Waste Policy Amendments Act of 2000. Override attempt failed in Senate, 64–35 (66 needed).
32. August 5, 2000: Vetoed H.R. 4810, Marriage Tax Relief Reconciliation Act of 2000. Override attempt failed in House, 270–158 (286 needed).
33. August 31, 2000: Vetoed H.R. 8, Death Tax Elimination Act of 2000. Override attempt failed in House, 274–157 (288 needed).
34. October 7, 2000: Vetoed H.R. 4733, Energy and Water Appropriations Act, 2001. Overridden by House, 315–98 on October 11 (276 needed). No attempt made in Senate.
35. October 30, 2000: Vetoed H.R. 4516, Legislative Branch and the Treasury and General Government Appropriations Act, 2001. No override attempt made.
36. November 4, 2000: Vetoed H.R. 4392, Intelligence Authorization Act for Fiscal Year 2001. No override attempt made.
37. December 19, 2000: Pocket vetoed H.R. 2415, Bankruptcy Reform Act of 2000.

=== George W. Bush ===
Twelve vetoes, including one veto whose status is disputed (Bush claimed it was a pocket veto; the Senate considers it to have been a regular veto):

1. July 19, 2006: Vetoed H.R. 810, Stem Cell Research Enhancement Act of 2005, a bill to ease restrictions on federal funding for embryonic stem cell research. Override attempt failed in House, 235–193 (286 needed).
2. May 1, 2007: Vetoed H.R. 1591, U.S. Troop Readiness, Veterans' Care, Katrina Recovery, and Iraq Accountability Appropriations Act, 2007. Override attempt failed in House, 222–203 (284 needed). A later version of the bill that excluded certain aspects of the initial legislation that the president disapproved of H.R. 2206, was enacted as Pub. L. 110–28 (text) (PDF) with the president's approval.
3. June 20, 2007: Vetoed S. 5, Stem Cell Research Enhancement Act of 2007. No override attempt made.
4. October 3, 2007: Vetoed H.R. 976, Children's Health Insurance Program Reauthorization Act of 2007 ("SCHIP"). Override attempt failed in House, 273–156 (286 votes needed).
5. November 2, 2007: Vetoed H.R. 1495, Water Resources Development Act of 2007. Overridden by House, 361–54 (277 votes needed). Overridden by Senate, 79–14 (62 needed), and enacted as Pub. L. 110–114 (text) (PDF) over the president's veto.
6. November 13, 2007: Vetoed H.R. 3043, Departments of Labor, Health and Human Services, and Education, and Related Agencies Appropriations Act of 2008. Override attempt failed in House, 277–141 (279 votes needed).
7. December 12, 2007: Vetoed H.R. 3963, Children's Health Insurance Program Reauthorization Act of 2007. Override attempt failed in House, 260–152 (275 votes needed).
8. December 28, 2007: Vetoed H.R. 1585, National Defense Authorization Act for Fiscal Year 2008. No override attempt made. A later version of the bill that changed a minor provision of which the president disapproved was quickly passed by Congress (H.R. 4986) and was enacted with the president's approval as Pub. L. 110–181 (text) (PDF) on January 28, 2008. (Note: President Bush characterized this veto as a pocket veto, but the Senate disputes this and counts it as a regular veto. See Vetoes by President George W. Bush)
9. March 8, 2008: Vetoed H.R. 2082, Intelligence Authorization Act for Fiscal Year 2008. Override attempt failed in House, 225–188 (276 votes needed).
10. May 21, 2008: Vetoed H.R. 2419, 2007 U.S. Farm Bill. Overridden by House, 316–108 (283 votes needed). Overridden by Senate, 82–13 (64 votes needed). Enacted as Pub.L. 110–234 over the president's veto. Due to a clerical error, this act was repealed by Pub.L. 110–246.
11. June 18, 2008: Vetoed H.R. 6124, 2007 U.S. Farm Bill, re-passed by Congress to correct a clerical error in HR 2419. Overridden by House, 317–109 (284 votes required). Overridden by Senate, 80–14 (63 votes needed). Enacted as Pub.L. 110–246 over the president's veto.
12. July 15, 2008: Vetoed H.R. 6331, Medicare Improvements for Patients and Providers Act of 2008. Overridden by House, 383–41 (283 votes required.) Overridden by Senate, 70–26 (64 votes required). Enacted as Pub. L. 110–275 (text) (PDF) over the president's veto.

=== Barack Obama ===
President Obama issued twelve vetoes, of which the status of five is disputed (Obama considered them pocket vetoes, but since he returned the parchments to Congress, the Senate considers them regular vetoes). They are:

1. December 30, 2009: Vetoed H.J.Res. 64, a joint resolution making further continuing appropriations for fiscal year 2010, and for other purposes. Override attempt failed in House 143–245, 1 present (259 needed). (Note: President Obama characterized his veto of this bill as a pocket veto, but since he returned the parchment to Congress, Congress treated it as a regular veto. See Vetoes by President Barack H. Obama)
2. October 7, 2010: Vetoed H.R. 3808, the Interstate Recognition of Notarizations Act of 2010. Override attempt failed in House, 185–235 (280 needed).
3. February 24, 2015: Vetoed S. 1, the Keystone XL Pipeline Approval Act. Override attempt failed in Senate, 62–36 (66 needed).
4. March 31, 2015: Vetoed S.J.Res. 8, a joint resolution providing for congressional disapproval under chapter 8 of title 5, United States Code, of the rule submitted by the National Labor Relations Board relating to representation case procedures. (Note: "Unanimous Consent Agreement – Veto Override" (PDF). Congressional Record 114th Congress, First Session. March 26, 2015. p. S2085. While the president cites the Pocket Veto Case in his memorandum, he also returned the joint resolution to the Secretary of the Senate, as the Senate had provided for the receipt of presidential messages during its adjournment. Therefore, this is a regular veto rather than a pocket veto.) Veto message tabled in Senate 96–3.
5. October 22, 2015: Vetoed H.R. 1735, the National Defense Authorization Act for Fiscal Year 2016. No override attempt made.
6. December 19, 2015: Vetoed S.J.Res. 23, a joint resolution providing for congressional disapproval under chapter 8 of title 5, United States Code, of a rule submitted by the Environmental Protection Agency relating to "Standards of Performance for Greenhouse Gas Emissions from New, Modified, and Reconstructed Stationary Sources: Electric Utility Generating Units". No override attempt made.
7. December 19, 2015: Vetoed S.J.Res. 24, a joint resolution providing for congressional disapproval under chapter 8 of title 5, United States Code, of a rule submitted by the Environmental Protection Agency relating to "Carbon Pollution Emission Guidelines for Existing Stationary Sources: Electric Utility Generating Units". No override attempt made.
8. January 8, 2016: Vetoed H.R. 3762, the Restoring Americans' Healthcare Freedom Reconciliation Act of 2015. Override attempt failed in House, 241–186 (285 needed).
9. January 19, 2016: Vetoed S.J.Res. 22, a joint resolution providing for congressional disapproval under chapter 8 of title 5, United States Code, of the rule submitted by the Corps of Engineers and the Environmental Protection Agency relating to the definition of "waters of the United States" under the Federal Water Pollution Control Act. Cloture on the veto message not invoked in Senate 52–40 (60 needed).
10. June 8, 2016: Vetoed H.J.Res. 88, a joint resolution disapproving the rule submitted by the Department of Labor relating to the definition of the term "Fiduciary". Override attempt failed in House, 239–180 (280 needed).
11. July 22, 2016: Vetoed H.R. 1777, the Presidential Allowance Modernization Act of 2016. No override attempt made.
12. September 23, 2016: Vetoed S. 2040, the Justice Against Sponsors of Terrorism Act. Overridden by Senate, 97–1 (66 needed). Overridden by House, 348–77, 1 present (284 votes needed). Enacted as Pub. L. 114–222 (text) (PDF) over the president's veto.

=== Donald Trump (first presidency) ===
1. March 15, 2019: Vetoed H.J.Res. 46, a joint resolution relating to a national emergency declared by the President on February 15, 2019. Override attempt failed in House, 248–181 (286 votes needed).
2. April 16, 2019: Vetoed S.J.Res. 7, a joint resolution to direct the removal of United States Armed Forces from hostilities in the Republic of Yemen that have not been authorized by Congress. Override attempt failed in Senate, 53–45 (66 votes needed).
3. July 24, 2019: Vetoed S.J.Res. 36, a joint resolution providing for congressional disapproval of the proposed transfer to the Kingdom of Saudi Arabia, the United Kingdom of Great Britain and Northern Ireland, the Kingdom of Spain, and the Italian Republic of certain defense articles and services. Override attempt failed in Senate, 45–40 (57 votes needed)
4. July 24, 2019: Vetoed S.J.Res. 37, a joint resolution providing for congressional disapproval of the proposed export to the United Arab Emirates, the United Kingdom of Great Britain and Northern Ireland, and the Republic of France of certain defense articles and services. Override attempt failed in Senate, 45–39 (56 votes needed).
5. July 24, 2019: Vetoed S.J.Res. 38, a joint resolution providing for congressional disapproval of the proposed export to the Kingdom of Saudi Arabia and the United Kingdom of Great Britain and Northern Ireland of certain defense articles and services. Override attempt failed in Senate, 46–41 (58 votes needed).
6. October 15, 2019: Vetoed S.J.Res. 54, a joint resolution relating to a national emergency declared by the President on February 15, 2019. Override attempt failed in Senate, 53–36 (60 votes needed).
7. May 6, 2020: Vetoed S.J.Res. 68, a joint resolution to direct the removal of United States Armed Forces from hostilities against the Islamic Republic of Iran that have not been authorized by Congress. Override attempt failed in Senate, 49–44 (62 votes needed)
8. May 29, 2020: Vetoed H.J.Res. 76 a joint resolution providing for congressional disapproval under chapter 8 of title 5, United States Code, of the rule submitted by the Department of Education relating to "Borrower Defense Institutional Accountability". Override attempt failed in House, 238–173 (276 votes needed).
9. December 23, 2020: Vetoed H.R. 6395, the William M. (Mac) Thornberry National Defense Authorization Act for Fiscal Year 2021. Overridden by House, 322–87 (273 votes needed). Overridden by Senate, 81–13 (63 votes needed). Enacted as Pub. L. 116–283 (text) (PDF) over the president's veto
10. January 1, 2021: Vetoed S. 906, the Driftnet Modernization and Bycatch Reduction Act. No override attempt made.

=== Joe Biden ===
Biden is the first president since Lyndon B. Johnson to have none of his vetoes overridden by Congress.

1. March 20, 2023: Vetoed H.J.Res. 30, a joint resolution providing for congressional disapproval under chapter 8 of title 5, United States Code, of the rule submitted by the Department of Labor relating to "Prudence and Loyalty in Selecting Plan Investments and Exercising Shareholder Rights". Override attempt failed in House on March 23, 2023, 219–200 (280 votes needed).
2. April 6, 2023: Vetoed H.J.Res. 27, a joint resolution providing for congressional disapproval under chapter 8 of title 5, United States Code, of the rule submitted by the Department of the Army, Corps of Engineers, Department of Defense and the Environmental Protection Agency relating to "Revised Definition of 'Waters of the United States'". Override attempt failed in House on April 18, 2023, 227–196 (282 votes needed).
3. May 16, 2023: Vetoed H.J.Res. 39, a joint resolution disapproving the rule submitted by the Department of Commerce relating to "Procedures Covering Suspension of Liquidation, Duties and Estimated Duties in Accord With Presidential Proclamation 10414". Override attempt failed in House on May 24, 2023, 214–205 (280 votes needed).
4. May 25, 2023: Vetoed H.J.Res. 42, a joint resolution disapproving the action of the District of Columbia Council in approving the Comprehensive Policing and Justice Reform Amendment Act of 2022. Override attempt failed in House on June 13, 2023, 233–197 (287 votes needed).
5. June 7, 2023: Vetoed H.J.Res. 45, a joint resolution providing for congressional disapproval under chapter 8 of title 5, United States Code, of the rule submitted by the Department of Education relating to "Waivers and Modifications of Federal Student Loans". Override attempt failed in House on June 21, 2023, 221–206 (285 votes needed).
6. June 14, 2023: Vetoed S.J.Res. 11, a joint resolution providing for congressional disapproval under chapter 8 of title 5, United States Code, of the rule submitted by the Environmental Protection Agency relating to "Control of Air Pollution From New Motor Vehicles: Heavy-Duty Engine and Vehicle Standards". Override attempt failed in Senate on June 21, 2023, 50–50 (67 votes needed).
7. September 26, 2023: Vetoed S.J.Res. 9, a joint resolution providing for congressional disapproval under chapter 8 of title 5, United States Code, of the rule submitted by the United States Fish and Wildlife Service relating to "Endangered and Threatened Wildlife and Plants; Lesser Prairie-Chicken; Threatened Status with Section 4(d) Rule for the Northern Distinct Population Segment and Endangered Status for the Southern Distinct Population Segment". Override attempt failed in Senate on September 28, 2023, 47–46 (62 votes needed).
8. September 26, 2023: Vetoed S.J.Res. 24, a joint resolution providing for congressional disapproval under chapter 8 of title 5, United States Code, of the rule submitted by the United States Fish and Wildlife Service relating to "Endangered and Threatened Wildlife and Plants; Endangered Species Status for Northern Long-Eared Bat". Override attempt failed in Senate on September 28, 2023, 47–45 (62 votes needed).
9. December 19, 2023: Vetoed S.J.Res. 32, a joint resolution providing for congressional disapproval under chapter 8 of title 5, United States Code, of the rule submitted by the Bureau of Consumer Financial Protection relating to “Small Business Lending Under the Equal Credit Opportunity Act (Regulation B)". Override attempt failed in Senate on January 10, 2024, 54–45 (67 votes needed).
10. January 24, 2024: Vetoed S.J.Res. 38, a joint resolution providing for congressional disapproval under chapter 8 of title 5, United States Code, of the rule submitted by the Federal Highway Administration relating to “Waiver of Buy America Requirements for Electric Vehicle Chargers”. Override attempt failed in Senate on February 29, 2024, 50–47 (65 votes needed).
11. May 3, 2024: Vetoed H.J.Res. 98, a joint resolution providing for congressional disapproval under chapter 8 of title 5, United States Code, of the rule submitted by the National Labor Relations Board relating to "Standard for Determining Joint Employer Status". Override attempt failed in House on May 7, 2024, 214–191 (270 votes needed).
12. May 31, 2024: Vetoed H.J.Res. 109, a joint resolution providing for congressional disapproval under chapter 8 of title 5, United States Code, of the rule submitted by the Securities and Exchange Commission relating to "Staff Accounting Bulletin No. 121". Override attempt failed in House July 11, 2024, 228–184 (274 votes needed).
13. December 23, 2024: Vetoed S. 4199, the Judicial Understaffing Delays Getting Emergencies Solved (JUDGES) Act of 2024. No override attempt made.

=== Donald Trump (second presidency) ===
1. December 29, 2025: Vetoed H.R. 131, the "Finish the Arkansas Valley Conduit Act". Override attempt failed in House January 8, 2026, 248–177
2. December 29, 2025: Vetoed H.R. 504, the "Miccosukee Reserved Area Amendments Act". Override attempt failed in House January 8, 2026, 236–188

== See also ==
- Signing statement – Statement by US president when approving laws
