= Bankruptcy Appellate Panel =

A Bankruptcy Appellate Panel (abbreviated BAP) is authorized by 28 U.S.C. § 158(b) to hear, with the consent of all parties, appeals from the decisions of the United States bankruptcy courts in their district that otherwise would be heard by district courts, but only in those districts in which the district judges authorize appeals to BAPs. BAPs typically sit as three-judge panels composed of bankruptcy judges appointed from the circuit's districts, with the restriction that no judge may participate in an appeal arising from that judge's own district.

Not all of the federal judicial circuits have convened a BAP. As of 2011, only the First, Sixth, Eighth, Ninth, and Tenth Circuits had convened these panels.

== History ==
The Bankruptcy Reform Act of 1978 permitted federal judicial circuits to establish Bankruptcy Appellate Panels to hear appeals from the bankruptcy courts. Those circuits which chose not to establish panels would have bankruptcy appeals heard by the United States district courts.

The first circuits to establish Bankruptcy Appellate Panels were the Ninth Circuit (in 1979) and the First Circuit (in 1980). The aftermath of the landmark Northern Pipeline Co. v. Marathon Pipe Line Co. case in 1982 had different effects on the two circuits. Even though the U.S. Supreme Court did not directly address the constitutionality of the panels in that decision, the First Circuit held that the emergency rules adopted after the decision was rendered pre-empted the use of their BAP, and subsequently disbanded it. The Ninth Circuit disagreed, holding that because the BAP was supervised by the Court of Appeals, and because the BAP's decisions could be appealed to the Court of Appeals, it was constitutional and could therefore continue.

In 1994, Congress enacted the Bankruptcy Reform Act of 1994, which included an amendment of 28 U.S.C. § 158 (the statute governing appeals in bankruptcy cases) to require all circuits to establish a BAP unless the judicial council of a circuit found that (1) there were insufficient judicial resources in the circuit to do so, or (2) the establishment of a BAP would result in undue delay or increased cost to parties in bankruptcy cases.

In 1996, the First Circuit reestablished its BAP, and four new panels were created in the Second, Sixth, Eighth, and Tenth Circuits. The Seventh Circuit deferred making a decision, and the remaining five circuits declined to create a BAP. The Second Circuit BAP ceased operations on July 1, 2000.

== Procedures ==
The BAP in each judicial circuit has its own local rules of practice, in addition to the Federal Rules of Bankruptcy Procedure and Federal Rules of Appellate Procedure. Parties to the bankruptcy case retain the right to have their appeal heard by a district court instead of a BAP by filing an election to transfer the case. Judges on a BAP are generally barred from hearing a case from their own bankruptcy district.

Appeals from the BAP itself are directed to the court of appeals for that circuit.
