= Federal Magistrates Act =

The Magistrates Act

The 90th United States Congress
- Long title: The Federal Magistrates Act of 1968
- Citation: S.945
- Enacted by: The 90th United States Congress
- Signed: October 17, 1968
- Introduced by: Joseph D. Tydings

Related legislation
- The Bankruptcy Reform Act of 1978

The Federal Magistrates Act of 1968 was enacted by Congress to reform and modernize the federal judiciary. Its primary objective was to create the position of magistrate judges to handle minor judicial functions, easing the workload of district court judges.

== Historical background ==
The Act was born out of a need for judicial efficiency during a period when federal courts faced a mounting backlog of cases. The Federal Magistrates Act of 1968 established the position of United States magistrates (now referred to as magistrate judges) within the federal judiciary. This law aimed to address inefficiencies in the federal court system by delegating certain judicial tasks from district judges to magistrates. Over the years, the act has undergone amendments to enhance the role of magistrate judges and improve the administration of justice.

The act’s purpose was twofold: to alleviate the workload of district court judges and to provide more efficient resolution of federal cases. By creating magistrate judges, Congress intended to streamline the judiciary and ensure that minor judicial matters were handled promptly, thereby freeing district judges to focus on complex cases.

== Legislative history ==
The Federal Magistrates Act originated from recommendations by the Judicial Conference of the United States. By the 1960s, district courts faced significant backlogs due to increasing caseloads. Congress recognized the need for a solution to these delays and sought to expand the judiciary's capacity.

The act was introduced in the House of Representatives in early 1968 as part of a larger judicial reform package. After committee hearings and bipartisan support, the bill passed both houses of Congress and was signed into law by President Lyndon B. Johnson on October 17, 1968.

Key legislative milestones include:

1. Judicial Conference recommendations (1965–1967).
2. Initial introduction and committee deliberations in early 1968.
3. Final passage of the bill in September 1968.
4. Presidential signing and subsequent implementation in October 1968.

== Provisions of the Act ==
The act outlined several core features:

=== Creation of magistrate positions ===
1. Authorized each federal district court to appoint magistrates based on workload.
2. Magistrates were granted authority to assist district judges with pretrial matters and other specified duties.

=== Jurisdiction and Duties ===
1. Conduct preliminary hearings in criminal cases.
2. Issue warrants and subpoenas.
3. Hear evidence and make recommendations in civil cases referred by district judges.

=== Selection and appointment ===
Magistrates are appointed by a majority vote of district judges in their respective districts. Candidates must meet statutory qualifications, including good standing as members of the bar and a history of legal practice. The chief judge of the district organizes a merit selection panel to interview a candidate, and the panel makes a recommendation to the court about whether or not the applicant should be appointed as a magistrate judge. After the vote, the chief judge decides whether or not to adopt the recommendation. If the recommendation is adopted, an investiture is held before the chief judge for the magistrate judge, beginning the start of the magistrate's term.

=== Compensation and terms ===
Initial terms were set at eight years for full-time magistrates and four years for part-time magistrates. Compensation was determined based on recommendations from the Judicial Conference.

=== Expansion of judicial capacity ===
Focused on delegating routine tasks to magistrates, reducing delays in the courts.

== Role of magistrates before 1968 ==
Before the Federal Magistrates Act, the federal judiciary relied on commissioners to handle minor judicial matters. However, the commissioner system was widely criticized for its lack of professionalism and limited jurisdiction.

Commissioners primarily handled arrest warrants, bail determinations, and preliminary examinations. While they served a useful function, their authority was insufficient to address the growing demands on the judiciary.

The act replaced commissioners with magistrates, who were granted broader powers and professionalized roles. This change marked a significant shift in how the federal judiciary managed its workload.

== Amendments to the Federal Magistrates Act ==
Since its passage in 1968, the Federal Magistrates Act has been amended several times to expand the powers and responsibilities of magistrate judges. Key amendments include:

=== 1976 amendment ===
1. Expanded the scope of duties magistrate judges could perform.
2. Allowed magistrates to preside over certain civil trials with the consent of the parties.

=== 1979 amendment ===
1. Permitted magistrates to conduct misdemeanor trials.
2. Provided clear guidelines for appeals of magistrate decisions.

=== 1990 Judicial Improvements Act ===
1. Changed the title from "magistrates" to "magistrate judges" to reflect their judicial authority.
2. Increased their role in alternative dispute resolution and pretrial management.

=== 2000 amendments ===
1. Codified the ability of magistrate judges to handle additional civil cases upon referral by district judges.
2. Enhanced their role in criminal proceedings, including overseeing jury selection.

== Impact on the federal judiciary ==
The Federal Magistrates Act has had a profound impact on the administration of justice in the United States. Key benefits include:

=== Reduction of backlogs ===
By delegating routine and preliminary tasks to magistrate judges, district courts have been able to focus on more complex cases.

=== Efficiency in case management ===
Magistrate judges often oversee pretrial conferences, manage discovery disputes, and facilitate settlements, which expedites case resolution.

=== Access to justice ===
Magistrate judges are often more accessible to litigants, particularly in remote or underserved areas.

=== Judicial innovation ===
Magistrate judges have played a key role in implementing alternative dispute resolution mechanisms and other judicial reforms.

== Criticism and challenges ==
Despite its success, the Federal Magistrates Act has faced criticism and challenges over the years. Common concerns include:

=== Consent requirements ===
Critics argue that requiring party consent for magistrate judges to preside over certain trials creates inefficiencies and unnecessary delays.

=== Uneven workloads ===
The distribution of magistrate judges across districts does not always align with caseload demands, leading to disparities in efficiency.

=== Perceived lack of authority ===
Some litigants perceive magistrate judges as having less authority or prestige compared to district judges, which can affect their willingness to consent. The sharpest criticism to date can be found at 423 U.S. 261. The Supreme Court of the United States acknowledged an argument from the Secretary of Health, Education and Welfare that magistrate judges are "super notaries", and not Article III judges as prescribed by the Constitution. The Supreme Court did not take a position on this argument, and instead focused on the powers afforded to magistrate judges under the Federal Magistrates Act.

Magistrate judges are Article I judges and the question of magistrate judges presiding over trials and exercising jurisdiction outside the consent constraints of the Act are debatable and unsettled law. The Constitution of the United States entitles Americans to Article III judges with "life tenure" and magistrate judges do not have life tenure. Their appointments range from terms of 4 to 8 years. Part-time magistrates are appointed for 4-year terms, while full-time magistrate judges are appointed for 8-year terms.

== Judicial opinions and case law ==
The role of magistrate judges has been shaped by significant judicial opinions interpreting the Federal Magistrates Act. Key cases include:

=== United States v. Raddatz (1980) ===
Affirmed the authority of magistrate judges to conduct evidentiary hearings and make recommendations in criminal cases.

=== Peretz v. United States (1991) ===
Upheld the ability of magistrate judges to oversee jury selection in felony cases with party consent.

== Comparison with other judicial systems ==
The concept of magistrate judges is not unique to the United States. Similar systems exist in other countries, including:

=== United Kingdom ===
Lay magistrates (Justices of the Peace) handle minor criminal and civil matters, often without formal legal training.

=== Canada ===
Provincial court judges perform functions analogous to U.S. magistrate judges, such as handling preliminary inquiries in criminal cases.

=== Australia ===
Magistrates in Australia’s state and territory courts oversee a broad range of cases, including traffic offenses and small claims.

== Future of the Federal Magistrates Act ==
As the federal judiciary continues to evolve, the role of magistrate judges could expand further. Potential areas for growth include:

=== Technological integration ===
Magistrate judges could play a key role in managing virtual hearings and implementing e-filing systems.

=== Expanded or reduced jurisdiction ===
Congress may consider granting magistrate judges greater authority in civil and criminal matters to further alleviate district court workloads. However, on December 23, 2024, President Joe Biden vetoed the JUDGES Act of 2024, which may encourage Congress to seek a reduction in magistrate jurisdiction as other avenues are explored to expand the judiciary.

=== Diversity, equity and inclusion ===
Efforts to recruit magistrate judges from diverse backgrounds could enhance public trust in the judiciary. Magistrate judge Embry Kidd was confirmed by the U.S. Senate, 49-45 after being nominated to the Eleventh Circuit Court of Appeals by President Biden. The President also nominated magistrate judge Julie S. Sneed to the district court before she was confirmed as a district judge , demonstrating that magistrate judges were a reliable pool for the Biden administration's efforts to strengthen public faith in the system through diversity, equity and inclusion.

== Excerpted text ==
Federal Magistrates Act (P.L. 90-578), enacted October 17, 1968

To abolish the office of United States commissioner, to establish in place thereof within the judicial branch of the Government the office of United States magistrate, and for other purposes. Be it enacted by the Senate and House of Representatives of the United States of America in Congress assembled, That this Act may be cited as the "Federal Magistrates Act".

== Notable cases ==
Supreme Court decisions illustrate the role of magistrate judges under this Act. One notable case is:

- Peretz v. United States (1991)
