= United States bankruptcy courts =

Courts created under Article I of the United States Constitution

United States bankruptcy courts are federal tribunal courts created under Article I of the United States Constitution. The current system of bankruptcy courts was created by the United States Congress in 1978, effective April 1, 1984. United States bankruptcy courts function as units of the Article III federal district courts and have subject-matter jurisdiction over bankruptcy cases. The federal district courts have original and exclusive jurisdiction over all cases arising under the bankruptcy code, (see 28 U.S.C. § 1334(a)), and bankruptcy cases cannot be filed in state court. Each of the 94 federal judicial districts handles bankruptcy matters.

Technically, the United States district courts have subject matter jurisdiction over bankruptcy matters (see 28 U.S.C. § 1334(a)). However, each such district court may, by order, "refer" bankruptcy matters to the bankruptcy court (see 28 U.S.C. § 157(a)). As a practical matter, most district courts have a standing "reference" order to that effect, so that all bankruptcy cases in that district are handled, at least initially, by the bankruptcy court. In unusual circumstances, a district court may in a particular case "withdraw the reference" (i.e., take the case or a particular proceeding within the case away from the bankruptcy court and decide the matter itself) under 28 U.S.C. § 157(d).

The overwhelming majority of all proceedings in bankruptcy are held before a United States bankruptcy judge, whose decisions are subject to appeals to the district court. In some judicial circuits, appeals may be taken to a Bankruptcy Appellate Panel (BAP). The bankruptcy judges in each judicial district in regular active service constitute a "unit" of the applicable United States district court (see 28 U.S.C. § 151). The bankruptcy judge is appointed for a renewable term of 14 years by the United States Court of Appeals for the circuit in which the applicable district is located (see 28 U.S.C. § 152).

The Federal Rules of Bankruptcy Procedure (FRBP) govern procedure in the U.S. bankruptcy courts.

Decisions of the bankruptcy courts are not collected and published in an official reporter produced by the government. Instead, the de facto official source for opinions of the bankruptcy courts is West's Bankruptcy Reporter, published privately by Thomson West.

Bankruptcy courts appoint a trustee to represent the interests of the creditors and administer the cases. The U.S. Trustee appoints Chapter 7 trustees for a renewable period of 1 year, Chapter 13 trustees are "standing trustees" who administer cases in a specific geographic region.
