= Peretz v. United States =

- Supreme Court of the United States

Argued April 23, 1991 Decided June 27, 1991
- Full case name: Peretz v. United States
- Citations: 501 U.S. 923 (more) 111 S. Ct. 2661; 115 L. Ed. 2d 808

Case history
- Prior: Defendant was charged with importing heroin. A federal magistrate conducted jury selection, and defendant acquiesced, raising no objection in the district court. On appeal, he contended that the magistrate's conducting jury selection violated his rights under Article III of the Constitution. The Second Circuit disagreed; cert. granted.

Holding
- If the parties consent, Article III and the Federal Magistrates Act allow a district court to delegate to a magistrate judge the responsibility for managing jury selection in a felony trial.

Court membership
- Chief Justice William Rehnquist Associate Justices Byron White · Thurgood Marshall; Harry Blackmun · John P. Stevens; Sandra Day O'Connor · Antonin Scalia; Anthony Kennedy · David Souter

Case opinions
- Majority: Stevens, joined by Rehnquist, O'Connor, Kennedy, Souter
- Dissent: Marshall, joined by White, Blackmun
- Dissent: Scalia

Laws applied
- U.S. Const. art. III, Federal Magistrates Act, 28 U.S.C. § 636

Peretz v. United States, 501 U.S. 923 (1991), was a case at the Supreme Court of the United States. The Court affirmed that a defendant in a federal criminal trial on a felony charge must affirmatively object to the supervising of jury selection by a magistrate judge, ruling that it is not enough that the defendant merely acquiesce to the magistrate's involvement in his case for a court to reverse a conviction for this reason.

== Background ==
Peretz and a co-defendant had been indicted on smuggling four kilograms of heroin into the United States. The district judge who oversaw the trial asked if there was any objection to a magistrate conducting the jury selection, and Peretz did not make an objection. The district judge conducted the actual trial. Peretz did not object to the magistrate conducting the jury selection until he reached the court of appeals. The court of appeals disagreed, reasoning that the Federal Magistrates Act required him to object specifically to the involvement of a magistrate judge in his case. Since Peretz had not objected in the district court to the magistrate's involvement in the jury selection, the Second Circuit ruled that he had waived the objection.

== Opinion of the Court ==
In an opinion by Justice Stevens, the Court upheld Peretz's conviction.

=== Consent allows the magistrate to act ===
There exists a personal right for a litigant in federal court to insist on the involvement of a judge who has been appointed by the President and confirmed by the Senate in the manner contemplated by the Constitution. However, the Federal Magistrates Act authorizes magistrate judges to undertake "additional duties" when the parties in a case consent. For magistrates to undertake their routine tasks is a great relief to federal courts in processing their caseloads. When the parties consent, magistrates may supervise entire misdemeanor trials. "These duties [in supervising an entire trial] are comparable in responsibility and importance to presiding over voir dire at a felony trial." Thus, supervising voir dire is one of the "additional duties" Congress authorized magistrate judges to undertake.

=== A magistrate at voir dire does not implicate constitutional concerns ===
Although the involvement of an Article III judge is a personal right, it is a right that can be waived. In the course of a criminal proceeding, defendants are asked to waive many rights; the right to the involvement of an Article III judge at jury selection imposes little marginal cost on him. Furthermore, the decision to involve a magistrate in the first place rests with an Article III judge, and the parties may veto that decision. Article III judges retain "total control and jurisdiction" over the entire process, and must review the magistrate judge's decisions de novo if the parties ask. For the same reason that involving a magistrate judge does not implicate due process concerns (United States v. Raddatz), it does not implicate Article III concerns either.

=== Dissenting opinions ===
==== Justice Marshall's dissent ====
Justice Marshall disagreed that the parties' consent could vitiate the involvement of a magistrate. Congress did not, after all, specify jury selection in the Federal Magistrates Act. For Justice Marshall, the defendant's consent did not change this. Congress limited a magistrate's involvement to misdemeanors and other relatively minor roles, and jury selection is a major event in a felony trial. Furthermore, Congress did not allow an Article III judge to review the magistrate's involvement in jury selection. When the Court had previously ruled that the defendant's consent was the deciding factor in the propriety of a magistrate's involvement, it had also rested on a district judge's review of that involvement. Because there is none with respect to jury selection, a defendant's consent was not enough for Justice Marshall to extend a magistrate's involvement any further than Congress had expressly allowed.

Furthermore, Justice Marshall disputed that a magistrate's involvement in jury selection was consistent with Article III. The right to an Article III judge rests on his political independence and his role as a check and balance against the other two branches. The first of these is a personal right and therefore waivable. The second, however, is structural, and therefore unwaivable. Justice Marshall was willing to accede to the involvement of a magistrate if there would be de novo review in the district court. To justify a magistrate's involvement based on consent in the absence of judicial review went too far for Justice Marshall.

==== Justice Scalia's dissent ====
Because the Court's previous decision came while Peretz's case was pending in the court of appeals, Justice Scalia reasoned that the magistrate judge's involvement was plain error that affected Peretz's substantial rights. In Justice Scalia's view, the Government conceded that the Federal Magistrates Act did not authorize the magistrate's involvement in Peretz's jury selection, as Justice Marshall observed. Accordingly, Justice Scalia would have overturned Peretz's conviction.

== See also ==
- List of United States Supreme Court cases, volume 501
- List of United States Supreme Court cases
- Lists of United States Supreme Court cases by volume
- List of United States Supreme Court cases by the Rehnquist Court
