= JUDGES Act of 2024 =

Proposed United States federal judiciary law

Judicial Understaffing Delays Getting Emergencies Solved Act of 2024
- Long title: An act to authorize additional district judges for the district courts and convert temporary judgeships.
- Acronyms (colloquial): JUDGES Act of 2024
- Announced in: the 118th United States Congress

Legislative history
- Introduced in the Senate as S. 4199 by Todd Young (R‑IN) on April 19, 2024; Committee consideration by Senate Committee on the Judiciary; Passed the Senate on August 1, 2024 (by unanimous consent); Passed the House on December 12, 2024 (236-173); Vetoed by President Joe Biden on December 23, 2024; 22 months ago

The Judicial Understaffing Delays Getting Emergencies Solved (JUDGES) Act of 2024 was a legislative proposal aimed at expanding the Federal judiciary of the United States to address increasing caseloads and judicial backlogs. The bill sought to create 66 new federal district judgeships across 25 district courts in 13 states, including California, Florida, and Texas, with the additions phased in over several years through 2035.

The bill passed in Congress with a vote of 236–173, which represented the first attempt at a major expansion of the judiciary in 30 years, although Senators Dick Durbin and Jerry Nadler accused Republicans of suspicious timing in the introduction of the bill.

== Background ==
Introduced by Senator Todd Young (R-Indiana), the JUDGES Act garnered bipartisan support in Congress. The bill was supported by a total of 17 cosponsors, of whom 9 were Democrats and 8 were Republicans. The Senate unanimously approved the bill in August 2024, reflecting a consensus on the necessity to bolster the federal judiciary to manage growing caseloads. The House of Representatives passed the bill in December 2024, following the 2024 presidential election.

The Judges Act follows a prolonged gap in the creation of American Judicial legislation. The last time Congress passed legislation to increase the number of federal judgeships was the Judicial Improvement Act of 1990. The Judicial Improvement Act authorized 85 new judgeships. Since 1990, the U.S. population has grown by 30%, while District Court filings have increased by 30%, and the number of judgeships in the U.S. has remained the same. With the United States' growing population, Senator Coons and Young cited disparities within the federal judiciary. States that had judges added under the JUDGES Act were Arizona, California, Colorado, Delaware, Florida, Georgia, Idaho, Indiana, Iowa, Nebraska, New Jersey, New York, and Texas, totaling 13 states.

== Provisions and expansion ==
The JUDGES Act proposed the following key measures:

- Establishment of 66 new permanent federal district judgeships to be introduced incrementally over a decade, targeting districts experiencing significant caseload pressures.
- The new judgeships were to be allocated over three presidential administrations, ensuring a gradual enhancement of judicial capacity.
- In addition to creating new positions, the act aimed to convert certain temporary judgeships into permanent roles to provide stability and continuity within the judiciary.
- The Judicial Conference of the United States decided upon the number of 66 judgeships for this legislation.
- The Judicial Conference recommends that courts have at least 430 weighted filings, with 500 filings in the 2022 fiscal year across 17 of the 30 courts.
- Some U.S. courts had up to 700 filings in the 2022 fiscal year, surpassing the 430 benchmark.
- Weighted filings describe a value or duration associated with a criminal or civil lawsuit that measures the judicial workload required for federal cases interpreted in the JUDGES Act.

== Judicial vacancies and senior status ==
During the Biden administration, vacancies, the timing of federal judicial appointments, and lifetime appointments were considered. The Rule of 80 applies to lifetime appointments and states that if a judge's age and service are equal to or exceed 80, the judge can semi-retire, and half of the U.S. federal judges opted for this opportunity. Senior status under the Rule of 80 creates a vacancy for a new full-time appointment to the federal judicial circuit, but many senior judges can still hear cases. 15-25% of the workload can be attributed to Federal Senior judges. The senior judges will not be counted toward the total number of federal judgeships, and districts relying on senior judges may still experience high caseloads.

== Presidential veto ==
On December 23, 2024, President Joe Biden vetoed the JUDGES Act. In his veto statement, Biden expressed concerns that the legislation was expedited without adequately resolving critical questions, particularly regarding the allocation of new judgeships and the consideration of the roles of senior status judges and magistrate judges in assessing the need for additional positions. He emphasized that a thorough analysis was necessary to ensure the efficient and effective administration of justice before creating lifetime appointments.

== Economic and financial contribution ==
The JUDGES ACT was projected to have a significant economic impact on the United States. From 2024 to 2029, the bill would cost the American economy $70 million, and between 2024 and 2034, it would cost $251 million. Net direct spending will be below $2.5 billion, and the budget deficit will be below $5 billion. Coon and Young sought to address judicial shortages to reduce backlogs and improve court access for all Americans. Coons and Young sponsored the JUDGES Act to create a system that supported the economy by being more efficient.

A 2025 Journal of Economic Behavior & Organization found that delays in court proceedings had a negative economic effect: the slower disputes are resolved, the more uncertainty there is within the business cycle, and that improving judicial timelines will help economic outcomes.

=== Reactions ===
The veto elicited varied responses:

- Senator Todd Young criticized the veto as partisan politics, arguing that the JUDGES Act was a fair, bipartisan effort to address judicial backlogs and that the president's decision undermined the pursuit of timely justice for Americans.
- Judge Robert J. Conrad, Jr., who is the Director of the Administrative Office of the United States Courts, issued a statement in which he explained that the president's veto of the JUDGES Act is extremely disappointing. He explains how adding judgeships is essential for the U.S. judicial system to run efficiently and effectively. Conversely, Jerry Nadler, a U.S. representative from NY, agreed with Biden. He explained that Trump would stack the courts with unqualified, ideological appointments, and that giving Trump power would be irresponsible.

== Allegations of partisanship ==
After the election of Donald Trump on November 5, 2024, many district court judges appointed by Democratic presidents who had previously planned to retire, decided to remain on the bench. Combined with the timing of the introduction of the Act itself and President Biden's veto of the bill, allegations of partisanship on both sides have arose as tensions rise over how the judiciary will be shaped in the near future.
