= War Damage Act 1943 =

Act of the Parliament of the United Kingdom

War Damage Act 1943 (Note: Section 128.)
- Act of Parliament
- Parliament of the United Kingdom
- Long title: An Act to consolidate the War Damage Act, 1941, the War Damage (Amendment) Act, 1942, and the War Damage (Amendment) Act, 1943 (other than provisions thereof for amending the War Risks Insurance Act, 1939).
- Citation: 6 & 7 Geo. 6. c. 21
- Territorial extent: United Kingdom

Dates
- Royal assent: 3 June 1943
- Commencement: 3 June 1943 (Note: The Acts of Parliament (Commencement) Act 1793.)
- Repealed: 21 May 1981
Other legislation
Amends	See § Repealed enactments
Repeals/revokes	See § Repealed enactments
Amended by	War Damage (Public Utility Undertakings, &c.) Act 1949; War Damage Act 1964; Statute Law (Repeals) Act 1974
Repealed by	Statute Law (Repeals) Act 1981
Relates to	War Damage Act 1941; War Damage Act 1964; War Damage Act 1965

Status: Repealed

Text of statute as originally enacted

The War Damage Act 1943 (6 & 7 Geo. 6. c. 21) was an act of the Parliament of the United Kingdom that consolidated enactments relating to war damage in the United Kingdom.

== Provisions ==
=== Repealed enactments ===
Section 127(1) of the act repealed 3 enactments, listed in the eighth schedule to the act.

Citation	Short title	Extent of repeal
4 & 5 Geo. 6. c. 12	War Damage Act 1941	The whole act, so far as not already repealed, except Part III, so much of section eighty-eight as relates to the War Risks Insurance Act 1939, and subsection (1) of section one hundred and two.
5 & 6 Geo. 6. c. 28	War Damage (Amendment) Act 1942	The whole act, except so much of section three as relates to the War Risks Insurance Act 1939, subsection (2) of section four, section five, subsection (1) of section seven, so much of subsection (2) of section seven as relates to citation, and subsection (5) of section seven.
6 & 7 Geo. 6. c. 12	War Damage (Amendment) Act 1943	The whole act.

== Subsequent developments ==
Section 3 of, and paragraphs 1 to 8 of schedule 1 to, the act were repealed by section 12 of, and part I of schedule 3 to, the War Damage Act 1964, which came into force on 1 October 1964. The same act dissolved the War Damage Commission and transferred its functions to the Commissioners of Inland Revenue.

Section 122 of the act was repealed by section 1 of, and part IX of the schedule to, the Statute Law (Repeals) Act 1974, which came into force on 27 June 1974.

The whole act was repealed by section 1(1) of, and part XI of schedule 1 to, the Statute Law (Repeals) Act 1981, which came into force on 21 May 1981.
