= List of acts of the Parliament of the United Kingdom from 1856 =

This is a complete list of acts of the Parliament of the United Kingdom for the year 1856.

Note that the first parliament of the United Kingdom was held in 1801; parliaments between 1707 and 1800 were either parliaments of Great Britain or of Ireland). For acts passed up until 1707, see the list of acts of the Parliament of England and the list of acts of the Parliament of Scotland. For acts passed from 1707 to 1800, see the list of acts of the Parliament of Great Britain. See also the list of acts of the Parliament of Ireland.

For acts of the devolved parliaments and assemblies in the United Kingdom, see the list of acts of the Scottish Parliament, the list of acts of the Northern Ireland Assembly, and the list of acts and measures of Senedd Cymru; see also the list of acts of the Parliament of Northern Ireland.

The number shown after each act's title is its chapter number. Acts passed before 1963 are cited using this number, preceded by the year(s) of the reign during which the relevant parliamentary session was held; thus the Union with Ireland Act 1800 is cited as "39 & 40 Geo. 3 c. 67", meaning the 67th act passed during the session that started in the 39th year of the reign of George III and which finished in the 40th year of that reign. Note that the modern convention is to use Arabic numerals in citations (thus "41 Geo. 3" rather than "41 Geo. III"). Acts of the last session of the Parliament of Great Britain and the first session of the Parliament of the United Kingdom are both cited as "41 Geo. 3".

Some of these acts have a short title. Some of these acts have never had a short title. Some of these acts have a short title given to them by later acts, such as by the Short Titles Act 1896.

== 19 & 20 Vict. ==
The fourth session of the 16th Parliament of the United Kingdom, which met from 31 January 1856 until 29 July 1856.

=== Public general acts ===
Short title	Citation	Royal assent
Long title
House of Commons Offices Act 1856	19 & 20 Vict. c. 1	28 February 1856
An Act to regulate certain Offices of the House of Commons.
Metropolitan Police Act 1856 (repealed)	19 & 20 Vict. c. 2	28 February 1856
An Act to amend the Acts relating to the Metropolitan Police. (Repealed by Statute Law Revision Act 1875 (38 & 39 Vict. c. 66), Statute Law Revision Act 1892 (55 & 56 Vict. c. 19), Metropolitan Police Act 1899 (62 & 63 Vict. c. 26), House of Commons Disqualification Act 1957 (5 & 6 Eliz. 2. c. 20), Administration of Justice Act 1973 (c. 15) and Greater London Authority Act 1999 (c. 29))
Joint Stock Banks (Scotland) Act 1856 (repealed)	19 & 20 Vict. c. 3	7 March 1856
An Act to extend the Period for which Her Majesty may grant Letters Patent of Incorporation to Joint Stock Banks in Scotland existing before the Act (Note: Joint Stock Banks (Scotland and Ireland) Act 1846 (9 & 10 Vict. c. 75)) of One thousand eight hundred and forty-six. (Repealed by Statute Law (Repeals) Act 1981 (c. 19))
Supply Act 1856 (repealed)	19 & 20 Vict. c. 4	7 March 1856
An Act to apply the Sum of One million six hundred and thirty-one thousand and five Pounds One Shilling and Fivepence out of the Consolidated Fund to the Service of the Year ending the Thirty-first Day of March One thousand eight hundred and fifty-six. (Repealed by Statute Law Revision Act 1875 (38 & 39 Vict. c. 66))
National Debt Act 1856 (repealed)	19 & 20 Vict. c. 5	7 March 1856
An Act for funding Exchequer Bills and raising Money by way of Annuities. (Repealed by Statute Law Revision Act 1870 (33 & 34 Vict. c. 69))
National Debt (No. 2) Act 1856 (repealed)	19 & 20 Vict. c. 6	7 March 1856
An Act for raising Five Millions by way of Annuities. (Repealed by Statute Law Revision Act 1870 (33 & 34 Vict. c. 69))
Supply (No. 2) Act 1856 (repealed)	19 & 20 Vict. c. 7	14 March 1856
An Act to apply the Sum of Twenty-six Millions out of the Consolidated Fund to the Service of the Year One thousand eight hundred and fifty-six. (Repealed by Statute Law Revision Act 1875 (38 & 39 Vict. c. 66))
Marine Mutiny Act 1856 (repealed)	19 & 20 Vict. c. 8	14 March 1856
An Act for the Regulation of Her Majesty's Royal Marine Forces while on Shore. (Repealed by Statute Law Revision Act 1875 (38 & 39 Vict. c. 66))
Public Money Drainage Act 1856 (repealed)	19 & 20 Vict. c. 9	14 March 1856
An Act to amend the Acts relating to the Advance of Public Money to promote the Improvement of Land. (Repealed by Statute Law Revision Act 1958 (6 & 7 Eliz. 2. c. 46))
Mutiny Act 1856 (repealed)	19 & 20 Vict. c. 10	14 March 1856
An Act for punishing Mutiny and Desertion, and for the better Payment of the Army and their Quarters. (Repealed by Statute Law Revision Act 1875 (38 & 39 Vict. c. 66))
Annual Inclosure Act 1856	19 & 20 Vict. c. 11	11 April 1856
An Act to authorize the Inclosure of certain Lands in pursuance of a Report of the Inclosure Commissioners for England and Wales.
Turnpike Trusts Act 1856 (repealed)	19 & 20 Vict. c. 12	11 April 1856
An Act to confirm certain Provisional Orders made under an Act of the Fifteenth Year of Her present Majesty, (Note: Turnpike Trusts (Making of Provisional Orders) Act 1851 (14 & 15 Vict. c. 38)) to facilitate Arrangements for the Relief of Turnpike Trusts. (Repealed by Statute Law (Repeals) Act 1981 (c. 19))
Delamere Forest Act 1856 (repealed)	19 & 20 Vict. c. 13	11 April 1856
An Act to make Provision for the Management of certain Lands belonging to Her Majesty within the former Limits of the late Forest of Delamere in the County of Chester. (Repealed by Crown Estate Act 1961 (9 & 10 Eliz. 2. c. 55))
Poor Law Commissioners (Ireland) Act 1856 (repealed)	19 & 20 Vict. c. 14	11 April 1856
An Act to abolish the Office of Secretary to the Poor Law Commissioners in Ireland. (Repealed by Statute Law Revision Act 1875 (38 & 39 Vict. c. 66))
Out-pensioners of Greenwich and Chelsea Hospitals Act 1856 (repealed)	19 & 20 Vict. c. 15	11 April 1856
An Act for further regulating the Payment of the Out-Pensioners of Greenwich and Chelsea Hospitals. (Repealed by Naval Pensions Act 1884 (47 & 48 Vict. c. 44) and Pensions and Yeomanry Pay Act 1884 (47 & 48 Vict. c. 55))
Central Criminal Court Act 1856 or the Trial of Offences Act 1856 or Palmer's Act (repealed)	19 & 20 Vict. c. 16	11 April 1856
An Act to empower the Court of Queen's Bench to order certain Offenders to be tried at the Central Criminal Court. (Repealed by Administration of Justice (Miscellaneous Provisions) Act 1938 (1 & 2 Geo. 6. c. 63))
Public Works Act 1856 (repealed)	19 & 20 Vict. c. 17	29 April 1856
An Act to authorize for a further Period the Advance of Money out of the Consolidated Fund for carrying on Public Works and Fisheries and for the Employment of the Poor. (Repealed by Public Works Loans Act 1875 (38 & 39 Vict. c. 89))
Public Works (Ireland) Act 1856 (repealed)	19 & 20 Vict. c. 18	29 April 1856
An Act to authorize for a further Period the Application of Money for the Purposes of Loans for carrying on Public Works in Ireland. (Repealed by Statute Law Revision Act 1875 (38 & 39 Vict. c. 66), Statute Law Revision Act 1892 (55 & 56 Vict. c. 19) and Public Works &c Loans Act (Northern Ireland) 1953 (c. 13 (N.I.)))
Exchequer Bills Act 1856 (repealed)	19 & 20 Vict. c. 19	29 April 1856
An Act for raising the Sum of Twenty-one million one hundred and eighty-two thousand seven hundred Pounds by Exchequer Bills for the Service of the Year One thousand eight hundred and fifty-six. (Repealed by Statute Law Revision Act 1875 (38 & 39 Vict. c. 66))
Bankers' Compositions Act 1856 or the Bankers' Composition Act 1856 (repealed)	19 & 20 Vict. c. 20	5 June 1856
An Act to continue certain Compositions payable to Bankers who have ceased to issue Bank Notes. (Repealed by Statute Law (Repeals) Act 1971 (c. 52))
National Debt (No. 3) Act 1856 (repealed)	19 & 20 Vict. c. 21	5 June 1856
An Act for raising the further Sum of Five Millions by way of Annuities. (Repealed by Statute Law Revision Act 1870 (33 & 34 Vict. c. 69))
Stamps Act 1856 (repealed)	19 & 20 Vict. c. 22	5 June 1856
An Act to amend tho Laws relating to the Duties on Fire Insurances. (Repealed by Inland Revenue Repeal Act 1870 (33 & 34 Vict. c. 99))
Canada Company's Amendment Act 1856 (repealed)	19 & 20 Vict. c. 23	23 June 1856
An Act for granting certain additional Powers and Authorities to the Canada Company. (Repealed by Canada Company Act 1916 (6 & 7 Geo. 5. c. xiv))
Juvenile Convict Prisons Act 1856 or the Juvenile Convict Prison (Ireland) Act 1856 (repealed)	19 & 20 Vict. c. 24	23 June 1856
An Act for enabling the Commissioners of Public Works in Ireland to acquire certain Lands for the Site of a Prison for the Reception of Juvenile Convicts. (Repealed by Statute Law Revision Act 1894 (57 & 58 Vict. c. 56))
Drafts on Bankers Act 1856 (repealed)	19 & 20 Vict. c. 25	23 June 1856
An Act to amend the Law relating to Drafts on Bankers. (Repealed by Crossed Cheques Act 1876 (39 & 40 Vict. c. 81))
Public Health Supplemental Act 1856	19 & 20 Vict. c. 26	23 June 1856
An Act to confirm Provisional Orders of the General Board of Health applying the Public Health Act, 1848, (Note: Public Health Act 1848 (11 & 12 Vict. c. 63)) to the Districts of Waterloo with Seaforth, West Ham, Sowerby Bridge, and Moss-side; for Alteration of the Boundaries of the Districts of Rusholme and Bishop Auckland; and for other Purposes.
	Provisional Order for the Application of the Public Health Act to the District of Waterloo with Seaforth, in the County Palatine of Lancaster.	
	Provisional Order for the Application of the Public Health Act, 1848, to the Parish of West Ham, in the County of Essex.	
	Provisional Order for the Application of the Public Health Act to the District of Sowerby Bridge, in the County of York.	
	Provisional Order for the Application of the Public Health Act to the District of Moss-side, in the County Palatine of Lancaster.	
	Provisional Order for altering the Boundaries of the District of Rusholme, in the County Palatine of Lancaster, as constituted for the Purposes of the Public Health Act, 1848.	
	Provisional Order for altering the Boundaries of the District of Bishop Auckland, in the County of Durham, as constituted for the Purposes of the Public Health Act, 1848.	
Pawnbrokers Act 1856 (repealed)	19 & 20 Vict. c. 27	23 June 1856
An Act to amend the Acts relating to Pawnbrokers. (Repealed by Pawnbrokers Act 1872 (35 & 36 Vict. c. 93))
Reformatory Schools (Scotland) Act 1856 (repealed)	19 & 20 Vict. c. 28	23 June 1856
An Act to make further Provision for rendering Reformatory and Industrial Schools in Scotland more available for the Benefit of Vagrant Children. (Repealed by Industrial Schools (Scotland) Act 1861 (24 & 25 Vict. c. 132))
National Gallery Act 1856 (repealed)	19 & 20 Vict. c. 29	23 June 1856
An Act to extend the Powers of the Trustees and Director of the National Gallery, and to authorize the Sale of Works of Art belonging to the Public. (Repealed by Museums and Galleries Act 1992 (c. 44))
Annuity to Sir W. F. Williams Act 1856 (repealed)	19 & 20 Vict. c. 30	23 June 1856
An Act to settle an Annuity on Sir William Fenwick Williams, in consideration of his eminent Services. (Repealed by Statute Law Revision (No. 2) Act 1893 (56 & 57 Vict. c. 54))
Oxford University Act 1856 (repealed)	19 & 20 Vict. c. 31	23 June 1856
An Act to amend the Act of the Seventeenth and Eighteenth Years of Her Majesty, (Note: Oxford University Act 1854 (17 & 18 Vict. c. 81)) concerning the University of Oxford and the College of Saint Mary Winchester. (Repealed by Statute Law Revision Act 1875 (38 & 39 Vict. c. 66))
Whichwood Disafforesting Amendment Act 1856 or the Whichwood Disafforesting Act 1856 (repealed)	19 & 20 Vict. c. 32	23 June 1856
An Act to amend the Whichwood Disafforesting Act, 1853. (Note: Whichwood Disafforesting Act 1853 (16 & 17 Vict. c. 36)) (Repealed by Wild Creatures and Forest Laws Act 1971 (c. 47))
Income Tax Act 1856 (repealed)	19 & 20 Vict. c. 33	30 June 1856
An Act to continue the Act for extending for a limited Time tho Provision for Abatement of Income Tax in respect of Insurance on Lives. (Repealed by Statute Law Revision Act 1875 (38 & 39 Vict. c. 66))
Excise Duties Act 1856 (repealed)	19 & 20 Vict. c. 34	30 June 1856
An Act to grant Allowances of Excise Duty on Malt in Stock; to alter and regulate certain Drawbacks and Allowances in respect of Malt Duty; to repeal and re-impose the Excise Duty on Sugar used in brewing Beer; and to amend the Law relating to Malt Roasters. (Repealed by Inland Revenue Act 1880 (43 & 44 Vict. c. 20))
West India Relief Commissioners Act 1856 (repealed)	19 & 20 Vict. c. 35	30 June 1856
An Act to authorize the West India Relief Commissioners to grant further Time for the Repayment of Monies advanced by them in certain Cases. (Repealed by West India Loan Act 1879 (42 & 43 Vict. c. 16))
Peace Preservation (Ireland) Act 1856 or the Peace Preservation, Ireland, Act 1856 (repealed)	19 & 20 Vict. c. 36	30 June 1856
An Act for the better Preservation of the Peace in Ireland. (Repealed by Statute Law Revision Act 1892 (55 & 56 Vict. c. 19) and Statute Law Revision Act (Northern Ireland) 1954 (c. 35 (N.I.)))
Transfer of Works (Ireland) Act 1856 (repealed)	19 & 20 Vict. c. 37	30 June 1856
An Act to amend the Act for transferring to Counties in Ireland certain Works constructed wholly or in part with the Public Money. (Repealed by Statute Law Revision Act 1892 (55 & 56 Vict. c. 19) and Statute Law Revision Act (Northern Ireland) 1954 (c. 35 (N.I.)))
Factory Act 1856 or the Factories Act 1856 (repealed)	19 & 20 Vict. c. 38	30 June 1856
An Act for the further Amendment of the Laws relating to Labour in Factories. (Repealed by Factory and Workshop Act 1878 (41 & 42 Vict. c. 16))
Sardinian Loan Act 1856 (repealed)	19 & 20 Vict. c. 39	30 June 1856
An Act to carry into effect a Convention respecting a Loan by Her Majesty to the King of Sardinia. (Repealed by Statute Law Revision Act 1950 (14 Geo. 6. c. 6))
Industrial and Provident Societies Act 1856 (repealed)	19 & 20 Vict. c. 40	7 July 1856
An Act to amend an Act of the Seventeenth and Eighteenth Years of Her present Majesty (Note: Industrial and Provident Societies Act 1854 (17 & 18 Vict. c. 25)) relating to Industrial and Provident Societies. (Repealed by Industrial and Provident Societies Act 1862 (25 & 26 Vict. c. 87))
Seamen's Savings Bank Act 1856 (repealed)	19 & 20 Vict. c. 41	7 July 1856
An Act to make further Provision for the Establishment of Savings Banks for Seamen. (Repealed by Merchant Shipping Act 1894 (57 & 58 Vict. c. 60))
Poor Rates Act 1856 (repealed)	19 & 20 Vict. c. 42	7 July 1856
An Act to continue the Act (Note: Poor Rate Exemption Act 1840 (3 & 4 Vict. c. 89)) for the Exemption of Stock in Trade from Rating. (Repealed by Statute Law Revision Act 1875 (38 & 39 Vict. c. 66))
Hereditary Revenues Act 1856 (repealed)	19 & 20 Vict. c. 43	7 July 1856
An Act to authorise issues out of the Consolidated Fund for the redemption of certain Annuities charged on branches of the gross revenue. (Repealed by Statute Law (Repeals) Act 1989 (c. 43))
Exchequer Bills and Bonds Act 1856 (repealed)	19 & 20 Vict. c. 44	14 July 1856
An Act for raising the Sum of Four Millions by Exchequer Bills and Exchequer Bonds, for the Service of the Year One thousand eight hundred and fifty-six. (Repealed by Statute Law Revision Act 1875 (38 & 39 Vict. c. 66))
St. Mary Magdalen Hospital, Bath Act 1856 (repealed)	19 & 20 Vict. c. 45	14 July 1856
An Act for confirming a Scheme of the Charity Commissioners for Saint Mary Magdalen Hospital near Bath. (Repealed by Statute Law Revision Act 1950 (14 Geo. 6. c. 6))
	Scheme for the Regulation of the Hospital of Saint Mary Magdalen in Holloway, near the City of Bath, and the Possessions thereof.	
Imprisonment (Scotland) Act 1856 (repealed)	19 & 20 Vict. c. 46	14 July 1856
An Act to exempt Imprisonments under the Act 5 Geo. 4. c. 96. (Note: Masters and Workmen Arbitration Act 1824 (5 Geo. 4. c. 96)) from the Operation of the Act (Note: Imprisonment for Debt (Scotland) Act 1835 (5 & 6 Will. 4. c. 70)) abolishing in Scotland Imprisonment for Civil Debts of small Amount. (Repealed by Statute Law Revision Act 1950 (14 Geo. 6. c. 6))
Joint Stock Companies Act 1856 (repealed)	19 & 20 Vict. c. 47	14 July 1856
An Act for the Incorporation and Regulation of Joint Stock Companies and other Associations. (Repealed by Companies Act 1862 (25 & 26 Vict. c. 89))
Justices (Scotland) Act 1856 (repealed)	19 & 20 Vict. c. 48	14 July 1856
An Act for amending the Procedure before Magistrates and Justices of Peace in Scotland. (Repealed by District Courts (Scotland) Act 1975 (c. 20))
Annual Turnpike Acts Continuance Act 1856 or the Turnpike Acts, Great Britain Act 1856 (repealed)	19 & 20 Vict. c. 49	14 July 1856
An Act to continue certain Turnpike Acts in Great Britain. (Repealed by Statute Law Revision Act 1875 (38 & 39 Vict. c. 66))
Sale of Advowsons Act 1856 (repealed)	19 & 20 Vict. c. 50	14 July 1856
An Act to enable Parishioners and others, forming a numerous Class, to sell Advowsons held by or in trust for them, and to apply the Proceeds in providing Parsonage Houses, augmenting small Livings, and to other beneficial Purposes; and for giving other Powers to such Persons. (Repealed by Patronage (Benefices) Measure 1986 (No. 3))
Use of Rice in Distillation Act 1856 (repealed)	19 & 20 Vict. c. 51	14 July 1856
An Act to permit the Use of Rice in the Distillation of Spirits. (Repealed by Statute Law Revision Act 1875 (38 & 39 Vict. c. 66))
Militia Ballots Suspension Act 1856 (repealed)	19 & 20 Vict. c. 52	14 July 1856
An Act to suspend the making of Lists and the Ballots for the Militia of the United Kingdom. (Repealed by Statute Law Revision Act 1875 (38 & 39 Vict. c. 66))
Moulton Endowed School Act 1856	19 & 20 Vict. c. 53	14 July 1856
An Act for confirming a Scheme of the Charity Commissioners for the Endowed School at Moulton in the County of Lincoln.
Grand Juries Act 1856 (repealed)	19 & 20 Vict. c. 54	14 July 1856
An Act to facilitate the Despatch of Business before Grand Juries in England and Wales. (Repealed by Criminal Justice Act 1948 (11 & 12 Geo. 6. c. 58))
Church Building Commissioners (Transfer of Powers) Act 1856 (repealed)	19 & 20 Vict. c. 55	21 July 1856
An Act for transferring the Powers of the Church Building Commissioners to the Ecclesiastical Commissioners for England. (Repealed by Statute Law Revision Act 1964 (c. 79))
Exchequer Court (Scotland) Act 1856	19 & 20 Vict. c. 56	21 July 1856
An Act to constitute the Court of Session the Court of Exchequer in Scotland, and to regulate Procedure in Matters connected with the Exchequer.
Manor Court of St. Sepulchre Abolition Act 1856 or the Manor Court of Saint Sepulchre Abolition Act 1856	19 & 20 Vict. c. 57	21 July 1856
An Act to abolish the Jurisdiction of the Court of the Liberties and Manor of Saint Sepulchre in and near Dublin, and for the future Regulation of certain Markets of the said Manor.
Burgh Voters Registration (Scotland) Act 1856 (repealed)	19 & 20 Vict. c. 58	21 July 1856
An Act to amend the Law for the Registration of Persons entitled to vote in the Election of Members to serve in Parliament for Burghs in Scotland. (Repealed by Statute Law Revision Act 1875 (38 & 39 Vict. c. 66), Statute Law Revision Act 1892 (55 & 56 Vict. c. 19), Town Councils (Scotland) Act 1900 (63 & 64 Vict. c. 49) and Representation of the People Act 1918 (7 & 8 Geo. 5. c. 64))
Revenue (Transfer of Charges) Act 1856 (repealed)	19 & 20 Vict. c. 59	21 July 1856
An Act to alter the Mode of providing for certain Expenses now charged upon certain Parts of the Public Revenue. (Repealed by Statute Law Revision Act 1963 (c. 30))
Mercantile Law Amendment Act (Scotland) 1856 or the Mercantile Law Amendment Act Scotland 1856	19 & 20 Vict. c. 60	21 July 1856
An Act to amend the Laws of Scotland affecting Trade and Commerce.
Survey Act 1856 or the Ordnance Survey Act 1856 (repealed)	19 & 20 Vict. c. 61	21 July 1856
An Act to continue an Act (Note: Ordnance Survey Act 1841 (4 & 5 Vict. c. 30)) for the Survey of Great Britain, Berwick-upon-Tweed, and the Isle of Man. (Repealed by Survey Act 1870 (33 & 34 Vict. c. 13))
Drainage (Ireland) Act 1856 (repealed)	19 & 20 Vict. c. 62	21 July 1856
An Act to provide for the Maintenance of Navigations made in connexion with Drainage, and to make further Provision in relation to Works of Drainage in Ireland. (Repealed by Drainage Act (Northern Ireland) 1925 (15 & 16 Geo. 5. c. 24 (N.I.)) and Erne Drainage and Development Act (Northern Ireland) 1950 (c. 15 (N.I.)))
Grand Jury (Ireland) Act 1856 (repealed)	19 & 20 Vict. c. 63	21 July 1856
An Act to amend the Acts relating to Grand Juries in Ireland. (Repealed by Roads and Road Traffic (Northern Ireland) Order 1978 (SI 1978/1051 (N.I. 21)))
Repeal of Obsolete Statutes Act 1856 or the Statute Law Revision Act 1856 (repealed)	19 & 20 Vict. c. 64	21 July 1856
An Act to repeal certain Statutes which are not in use. (Repealed by Statute Law Revision Act 1875 (38 & 39 Vict. c. 66))
Cottier Tenant (Ireland) Act 1856 (repealed)	19 & 20 Vict. c. 65	21 July 1856
An Act to encourage the providing of improved Dwellings for the Labouring Classes in Ireland. (Repealed by Summary Jurisdiction and Criminal Justice Act (Northern Ireland) 1935 (25 & 26 Geo. 5. c. 13 (N.I.)))
Rights of Way Near Aldershot Camp Act 1856	19 & 20 Vict. c. 66	21 July 1856
An Act to extinguish certain Rights of Way and to stop up certain Roads and Paths near the Camp at Aldershot.
Incumbered Estates (Ireland) Act 1856 (repealed)	19 & 20 Vict. c. 67	21 July 1856
An Act to extend the Period for applying for a Sale under the Acts for facilitating the Sale and Transfer of Incumbered Estates in Ireland, and to amend the said Acts. (Repealed by Statute Law Revision Act 1875 (38 & 39 Vict. c. 66))
Prisons (Ireland) Act 1856 (repealed)	19 & 20 Vict. c. 68	21 July 1856
An Act to further amend the Laws relating to Prisons in Ireland. (Repealed by Prison Officers Superannuation (Ireland) Act 1873 (36 & 37 Vict. c. 51), Statute Law Revision Act 1875 (38 & 39 Vict. c. 66), Statute Law Revision Act 1892 (55 & 56 Vict. c. 19), Statute Law Revision Act 1893 (56 & 57 Vict. c. 14), Statute Law Revision Act 1898 (61 & 62 Vict. c. 22) and Prison Act (Northern Ireland) 1953 (c. 18 (N.I.)))
County and Borough Police Act 1856 or the Police Act 1856 or the County Constabulary Act 1856 (repealed)	19 & 20 Vict. c. 69	21 July 1856
An Act to render more effectual the Police in Counties and Boroughs in England and Wales. (Repealed by Police Act 1964 (c. 48))
Confirmation of Marriages Act 1856 (repealed)	19 & 20 Vict. c. 70	29 July 1856
An Act to render valid certain Marriages in the Church at Coatham in the Parish of Kirk Leatham in the County of York. (Repealed by Statute Law (Repeals) Act 1977 (c. 18))
Annual Turnpike Acts (Ireland) Continuance Act 1856 (repealed)	19 & 20 Vict. c. 71	29 July 1856
An Act to continue certain Acts for regulating Turnpike Roads in Ireland. (Repealed by Statute Law Revision Act 1875 (38 & 39 Vict. c. 66))
Railways (Ireland) Act 1856 (repealed)	19 & 20 Vict. c. 72	29 July 1856
An Act to continue "The Railways Act (Ireland), 1851." (Note: Railways Act (Ireland) 1851 (14 & 15 Vict. c. 70)) (Repealed by Statute Law Revision Act 1875 (38 & 39 Vict. c. 66))
Indemnity Act 1856 (repealed)	19 & 20 Vict. c. 73	29 July 1856
An Act to indemnify such Persons in the United Kingdom as have omitted to qualify themselves for Offices and Employments, and to extend the Time limited for those Purposes respectively. (Repealed by Promissory Oaths Act 1871 (34 & 35 Vict. c. 48))
Episcopal, etc., Estates Management Act 1856 (repealed)	19 & 20 Vict. c. 74	29 July 1856
An Act to continue the Act (Note: Episcopal and Capitular Estates Act 1851 (14 & 15 Vict. c. 104)) to facilitate the Management and Improvement of Episcopal and Capitular Estates in England. (Repealed by Statute Law Revision Act 1875 (38 & 39 Vict. c. 66))
Customs Act 1856 (repealed)	19 & 20 Vict. c. 75	29 July 1856
An Act for the further Alteration and Amendment of the Laws and Duties of Customs. (Repealed by Statute Law (Repeals) Act 1977 (c. 18))
Roman Catholic Charities Act 1856 (repealed)	19 & 20 Vict. c. 76	29 July 1856
An Act to continue for a limited Time the Exemption of certain Charities from the Operation of the Charitable Trusts Acts. (Repealed by Statute Law Revision Act 1875 (38 & 39 Vict. c. 66))
Chancery Receivers (Ireland) Act 1856 (repealed)	19 & 20 Vict. c. 77	29 July 1856
An Act to amend the Law and Practice of the Court of Chancery in Ireland in relation to the Appointment of Receivers over Real Estate, and to expedite the Sale of Estates in the said Court. (Repealed by Judicature (Northern Ireland) Act 1978 (c. 23))
Unlawful Oaths (Ireland) Act 1856 or the Unlawful Oaths Amendment Continuance Act 1856 (repealed)	19 & 20 Vict. c. 78	29 July 1856
An Act to continue the Act of the Second and Third Years of Her Majesty, Chapter Seventy-four, (Note: Unlawful Societies (Ireland) Act 1839 (2 & 3 Vict. c. 74)) for preventing the administering and taking of unlawful Oaths in Ireland, as amended by an Act of the Eleventh and Twelfth Years of Her Majesty's Reign. (Note: Unlawful Combinations (Ireland) Act 1848 (11 & 12 Vict. c. 89)) (Repealed by Statute Law Revision Act 1875 (38 & 39 Vict. c. 66))
Bankruptcy (Scotland) Act 1856 (repealed)	19 & 20 Vict. c. 79	29 July 1856
An Act to consolidate and amend the Laws relating to Bankruptcy in Scotland. (Repealed by Bankruptcy (Scotland) Act 1913 (3 & 4 Geo. 5. c. 20))
Taxes Act 1856 (repealed)	19 & 20 Vict. c. 80	29 July 1856
An Act to grant Relief in assessing the Income Tax on Lands in Scotland in respect of certain Public Burdens charged thereon; to alter and regulate the Allowances to Clerks to the Commissioners of Income Tax; and to amend the Laws relating to the Land, Assessed, and Income Taxes, and the Redemption and Purchase of the Land Tax. (Repealed by Income Tax Act 1918 (8 & 9 Geo. 5. c. 40))
Stamps (No. 2) Act 1856 (repealed)	19 & 20 Vict. c. 81	29 July 1856
An Act to reduce the Stamp Duties on certain Instruments of Proxy; to amend the Laws relating to the stamping of Articles of Clerkship to Attorneys and others; and to exempt from Stamp Duty Admissions to the Freedom of the City of London by Redemption. (Repealed by Inland Revenue Repeal Act 1870 (33 & 34 Vict. c. 99))
Duty on Racehorses Act 1856 (repealed)	19 & 20 Vict. c. 82	29 July 1856
An Act to repeal and reimpose under new Regulations the Duty on Race-horses. (Repealed by Customs and Inland Revenue Act 1874 (37 & 38 Vict. c. 16))
Coast-guard Service Act 1856 or the Coastguard Service Act 1856 (repealed)	19 & 20 Vict. c. 83	29 July 1856
An Act to provide for the better Defence of the Coasts of the Realm, and the more ready Manning of the Navy, and to transfer to the Admiralty the Government of the Coast Guard. (Repealed by Coastguard Act 1925 (15 & 16 Geo. 5. c. 88))
Corrupt Practices Act 1856 (repealed)	19 & 20 Vict. c. 84	29 July 1856
An Act to continue the Corrupt Practices Prevention Act, 1854. (Note: Corrupt Practices Prevention Act 1854 (17 & 18 Vict. c. 102)) (Repealed by Statute Law Revision Act 1875 (38 & 39 Vict. c. 66))
General Board of Health Act 1856 (repealed)	19 & 20 Vict. c. 85	29 July 1856
An Act to continue the General Board of Health. (Repealed by Statute Law Revision Act 1875 (38 & 39 Vict. c. 66))
Cursitor Baron of the Exchequer Act 1856 (repealed)	19 & 20 Vict. c. 86	29 July 1856
An Act to abolish the Office of Cursitor Baron of the Exchequer. (Repealed by Statute Law Revision and Civil Procedure Act 1881 (44 & 45 Vict. c. 59))
Lunatic Asylums Act 1856 (repealed)	19 & 20 Vict. c. 87	29 July 1856
An Act to amend the Lunatic Asylums Act, 1853. (Note: Lunatic Asylums Act 1853 (16 & 17 Vict. c. 97)) (Repealed by Lunacy Act 1890 (53 & 54 Vict. c. 5))
Cambridge University Act 1856 or the Cambridge Reform Act 1856	19 & 20 Vict. c. 88	29 July 1856
An Act to make further Provision for the good Government and Extension of the University of Cambridge, of the Colleges therein, and of the College of King Henry the Sixth at Eton.
Form of Deeds (Scotland) Act 1856 (repealed)	19 & 20 Vict. c. 89	29 July 1856
An Act to abolish certain unnecessary Forms in the framing of Deeds in Scotland. (Repealed by Statute Law Revision Act 1892 (55 & 56 Vict. c. 19))
Militia Pay Act 1856 (repealed)	19 & 20 Vict. c. 90	29 July 1856
An Act to defray the Charge of the Pay, Clothing, and contingent and other Expenses of the Disembodied Militia in Great Britain and Ireland; to grant Allowances in certain Cases to Subaltern Officers, Adjutants, Paymasters, Quartermasters, Surgeons, Assistant Surgeons, and Surgeons Mates of the Militia; and to authorize the Employment of the Non-commissioned Officers. (Repealed by Statute Law Revision Act 1875 (38 & 39 Vict. c. 66))
Debts Securities (Scotland) Act 1856	19 & 20 Vict. c. 91	29 July 1856
An Act to amend and re-enact certain Provisions of an Act of the Fifty-fourth Year of King George the Third, (Note: Payment of Creditors (Scotland) Act 1814 (54 Geo. 3. c. 137)) relating to Judicial Procedure and Securities for Debts in Scotland.
Chancery Appeal Court (Ireland) Act 1856 (repealed)	19 & 20 Vict. c. 92	29 July 1856
An Act to constitute a Court of Appeal in Chancery, and to amend the Law relating to Appeals from the Incumbered Estates Court in Ireland. (Repealed by Judicature (Northern Ireland) Act 1978 (c. 23))
Commissioners of Supply (Scotland) Act 1856 (repealed)	19 & 20 Vict. c. 93	29 July 1856
An Act to constitute all legally qualified Persons in Scotland Commissioners of Supply without being named in an Act of Supply. (Repealed by Local Government (Scotland) Act 1929 (19 & 20 Geo. 5. c. 25))
Administration of Intestates' Estates Act 1856 (repealed)	19 & 20 Vict. c. 94	29 July 1856
An Act for the uniform Administration of Intestates Estates. (Repealed by Statute Law Revision Act 1892 (55 & 56 Vict. c. 19))
Oxford Colleges, etc., Estates Act 1856 (repealed)	19 & 20 Vict. c. 95	29 July 1856
An Act to give to the University of Oxford and to Colleges in the said University, and to the College of Saint Mary of Winchester near Winchester, Power to sell and exchange Lands, under certain Conditions. (Repealed by Universities and College Estates Act 1858 (21 & 22 Vict. c. 44))
Marriage (Scotland) Act 1856 (repealed)	19 & 20 Vict. c. 96	29 July 1856
An Act for amending the Law of Marriage in Scotland. (Repealed by Marriage (Scotland) Act 1939 (2 & 3 Geo. 6. c. 34))
Mercantile Law Amendment Act 1856	19 & 20 Vict. c. 97	29 July 1856
An Act to amend the Laws of England and Ireland affecting Trade and Commerce.
Burial Grounds (Ireland) Act 1856 (repealed)	19 & 20 Vict. c. 98	29 July 1856
An Act to amend the Laws relating to the Burial of the Dead in Ireland. (Repealed by Public Health (Ireland) Act 1878 (41 & 42 Vict. c. 52))
Lunatic Asylums, Superannuations, Ireland, Act 1856 (repealed)	19 & 20 Vict. c. 99	29 July 1856
An Act to amend the Acts relating to Lunatic Asylums in Ireland, so far as relates to Superannuations. (Repealed by Local Government (Ireland) Act 1898 (61 & 62 Vict. c. 37) and Asylums Officers' Superannuation Act 1909 (9 Edw. 7. c. 48))
Joint Stock Banks Act 1856 (repealed)	19 & 20 Vict. c. 100	29 July 1856
An Act to amend the Law with respect to the Election of Directors of Joint Stock Banks in England. (Repealed by Statute Law Revision Act 1892 (55 & 56 Vict. c. 19) and Statute Law (Repeals) Act 1973 (c. 39))
Contagious Diseases, Animals Act 1856 (repealed)	19 & 20 Vict. c. 101	29 July 1856
An Act to continue certain Acts to prevent the spreading of contagious or infectious Disorders among Sheep, Cattle, and other Animals. (Repealed by Statute Law Revision Act 1875 (38 & 39 Vict. c. 66))
Common Law Procedure Amendment Act (Ireland) 1856 or the Common Law Procedure Amendment (Ireland) Act 1856 (repealed)	19 & 20 Vict. c. 102	29 July 1856
An Act to further amend the Procedure in and to enlarge the Jurisdiction of the Superior Courts of Common Law in Ireland. (Repealed by Judicature (Northern Ireland) Act 1978 (c. 23))
Nuisances Removal (Scotland) Act 1856 (repealed)	19 & 20 Vict. c. 103	29 July 1856
An Act to make better Provision for the Removal of Nuisances, Regulation of Lodging Houses, and the Health of Towns in Scotland. (Repealed by Statute Law (Repeals) Act 1977 (c. 18))
New Parishes Act 1856 or Blandford's Act (repealed)	19 & 20 Vict. c. 104	29 July 1856
An Act to extend the Provisions of an Act of the Sixth and Seventh Years of Her Majesty, (Note: New Parishes Act 1843 (6 & 7 Vict. c. 37)) for making better Provision for the Spiritual Care of populous Parishes, and further to provide for the Formation and Endowment of separate and distinct Parishes. (Repealed by Isle of Man (Church Building and New Parishes) Act 1897 (60 & 61 Vict. c. 33), New Parishes Measure 1943 (No. 1) and Statute Law (Repeals) Act 1974 (c. 22))
Appropriation Act 1856 (repealed)	19 & 20 Vict. c. 105	29 July 1856
An Act to apply a Sum out of the Consolidated Fund and the Surplus of Ways and Means to the Service of the Year One thousand eight hundred and fifty-six, and to appropriate the Supplies granted in this Session of Parliament. (Repealed by Statute Law Revision Act 1875 (38 & 39 Vict. c. 66))
Second Annual Inclosure Act 1856	19 & 20 Vict. c. 106	29 July 1856
An Act to authorize the Inclosure of certain Lands in pursuance of a Special Report of the Inclosure Commissioners for England and Wales.
Smoke Abatement, London Act 1856 (repealed)	19 & 20 Vict. c. 107	29 July 1856
An Act to amend the Smoke Nuisance Abatement (Metropolis) Act, 1853. (Note: Smoke Nuisance Abatement (Metropolis) Act 1853) (Repealed by Public Health (London) Act 1891 (54 & 55 Vict. c. 76))
County Courts Act 1856 (repealed)	19 & 20 Vict. c. 108	29 July 1856
An Act to amend the Acts relating to the County Courts. (Repealed by County Courts Act 1888 (51 & 52 Vict. c. 43))
Reformatory, etc., Schools Act 1856 (repealed)	19 & 20 Vict. c. 109	29 July 1856
An Act to amend the Mode of committing Criminal and Vagrant Children to Reformatory and Industrial Schools. (Repealed by Reformatory Schools Act 1866 (29 & 30 Vict. c. 117))
Dublin Hospitals Regulation Act 1856 or the Dublin Hospitals Act 1856 (repealed)	19 & 20 Vict. c. 110	29 July 1856
An Act for the better Regulation of the House of Industry Hospitals and other Hospitals in Dublin supported wholly or in part by Parliamentary Grants. (Repealed by Statute Law (Repeals) Act 2013 (c. 2))
Stoke Poges Hospital Act 1856	19 & 20 Vict. c. 111	29 July 1856
An Act for confirming a Scheme of the Charity Commissioners for Stoke Poges Hospital in the County of Bucks, with certain Alterations.
	Scheme.	
Metropolis Management Amendment Act 1856 (repealed)	19 & 20 Vict. c. 112	29 July 1856
An Act to amend the Act of the last Session of Parliament, Chapter One hundred and twenty, (Note: Metropolis Management Act 1855 (18 & 19 Vict. c. 120)) for the better Local Management of the Metropolis. (Repealed by Local Law (Greater London Council and Inner London Boroughs) Order 1965 (SI 1965/540))
Foreign Tribunals Evidence Act 1856 (repealed)	19 & 20 Vict. c. 113	29 July 1856
An Act to provide for taking Evidence in Her Majesty’s Dominions in relation to Civil and Commercial Matters pending before Foreign Tribunals. (Repealed by Evidence (Proceedings in other Jurisdictions) Act 1975 (c. 34))
Hay and Straw Act 1856 (repealed)	19 & 20 Vict. c. 114	29 July 1856
An Act to prevent false Packing and other Frauds in the Hay and Straw Trade. (Repealed by Theft Act 1968 (c. 60))
Bishops of London and Durham Act 1856 (repealed)	19 & 20 Vict. c. 115	29 July 1856
An Act to provide for the Retirement of the present Bishops of London and Durham. (Repealed by Statute Law Revision Act 1875 (38 & 39 Vict. c. 66))
Education Department Act 1856 (repealed)	19 & 20 Vict. c. 116	29 July 1856
An Act for the Appointment of a Vice-President of the Committee of Council on Education. (Repealed by Board of Education Act 1899 (62 & 63 Vict. c. 33))
Poor Law (Scotland) Act 1856 (repealed)	19 & 20 Vict. c. 117	29 July 1856
An Act to amend the Law relating to the Relief of the Poor in Scotland. (Repealed by National Assistance Act 1948 (11 & 12 Geo. 6. c. 29))
Criminal Justice Act 1856 (repealed)	19 & 20 Vict. c. 118	29 July 1856
An Act to amend the Act of the last Session of Parliament (Note: Criminal Justice Act 1855 (18 & 19 Vict. c. 126)) for diminishing Expense and Delay in the Administration of Criminal Justice in certain Cases. (Repealed by Statute Law Revision Act 1953 (2 & 3 Eliz. 2. c. 5))
Marriage and Registration Act 1856 (repealed)	19 & 20 Vict. c. 119	29 July 1856
An Act to amend the Provisions of the Marriage and Registration Acts. (Repealed by Marriage Act 1949 (12, 13 & 14 Geo. 6. c. 76), Public Expenditure and Receipts Act 1968 (c. 14) and Statute Law (Repeals) Act 2004 (c. 14) and for Northern Ireland by Statute Law Revision Act (Northern Ireland) 1953 (c. 1 (N.I.)))
Settled Estates Act 1856 or the Leases and Sales of Settled Estates Act 1856 (repealed)	19 & 20 Vict. c. 120	29 July 1856
An Act to facilitate Leases and Sales of Settled Estates. (Repealed by Settled Estates Act 1877 (40 & 41 Vict. c. 18))

=== Local acts ===
Short title	Citation	Royal assent
Long title
London Docks Act 1856 (repealed)	19 & 20 Vict. c. i	29 April 1856
An Act to enable the London Dock Company to raise a further Sum of Money. (Repealed by London and Saint Katharine Docks Act 1864 (27 & 28 Vict. c. clxxviii))
Knottingley Gas Act 1856 (repealed)	19 & 20 Vict. c. ii	29 April 1856
An Act for supplying with Gas the Townships of Knottingley and Ferrybridge in the West Hiding of the County of York. (Repealed by West Yorkshire Act 1980 (c. xiv))
Colonial Bank Act 1856 (repealed)	19 & 20 Vict. c. iii	29 April 1856
An Act to extend the Period limited for the Exercise of the Powers of the Colonial Bank; and for other Purposes. (Repealed by Colonial Bank Act 1925 (15 & 16 Geo. 5. c. cvi))
Weymouth Gas Act 1856	19 & 20 Vict. c. iv	29 April 1856
An Act for lighting with Gas the Borough of Weymouth and Melcombe Regis, and its Neighbourhood, in the County of Dorset; and for other Purposes.
Chorley Waterworks Transfer Act 1856 (repealed)	19 & 20 Vict. c. v	29 April 1856
An Act for vesting in the Mayor, Aldermen, and Burgesses of the Borough of Liverpool the Undertaking of the Chorley Waterworks Company, and for other Purposes. (Repealed by County of Lancashire Act 1984 (c. xxi))
Lancaster Gas Company's Act 1856 (repealed)	19 & 20 Vict. c. vi	29 April 1856
An Act for incorporating the Lancaster Gaslight Company, and extending their Powers, and for authorizing additional Works, and the raising of further Monies; and for other Purposes. (Repealed by County of Lancashire Act 1984 (c. xxi))
Haslingden and Rawtenstall Waterworks Act 1856 (repealed)	19 & 20 Vict. c. vii	29 April 1856
An Act to enable the Haslingden and Rawtenstall Waterworks Company to raise a further Sum of Money, and for other Purposes. (Repealed by Bury and District Joint Water Board Act 1903 (3 Edw. 7. c. ccxxxiv))
Southport Waterworks Act 1856	19 & 20 Vict. c. viii	29 April 1856
An Act to enable the Southport Waterworks Company to raise a further Sum of Money, and for other Purposes.
Gainsborough Gas Act 1856 (repealed)	19 & 20 Vict. c. ix	29 April 1856
An Act for the better supplying with Gas the Parish of Gainsborough in Lincolnshire. (Repealed by Gainsborough Urban District Council Gas Act 1899 (62 & 63 Vict. c. lxxiv))
Lambeth Waterworks Act 1856	19 & 20 Vict. c. x	5 June 1856
An Act for enabling the Company of Proprietors of Lambeth Waterworks to raise further Money, and for other Purposes.
Dundee Harbour Act 1856 (repealed)	19 & 20 Vict. c. xi	5 June 1856
An Act for effecting certain Alterations in the Works of the Tidal Harbour of Victoria Dock at Dundee, and for other Purposes in relation to the Harbour of Dundee. (Repealed by Dundee Harbour Consolidation Act 1875 (38 & 39 Vict. c. cl))
Lincoln Waterworks Act 1856	19 & 20 Vict. c. xii	5 June 1856
An Act to enable the Lincoln Waterworks Company to raise a further Sum of Money.
Heywood Gas Amendment Act 1856	19 & 20 Vict. c. xiii	5 June 1856
An Act for granting further Powers to the Heywood Gaslight and Coke Company.
Milford Railway Act 1856	19 & 20 Vict. c. xiv	5 June 1856
An Act for the incorporating of the Milford Railway Company and for the making of the Milford Railway in the County of Pembroke.
London, Tilbury and Southend Railway Amendment Act 1856	19 & 20 Vict. c. xv	5 June 1856
An Act to enable the Eastern Counties and London and Blackball Railway Companies to raise a further Sum of Money for the Purposes of the London, Tilbury, and Southend Extension Railway; to amend the Acts relating to such Undertaking; and for other Purposes.
East Somerset Railway Act 1856	19 & 20 Vict. c. xvi	5 June 1856
An Act for making a Railway from the Wilts, Somerset, and Weymouth Railway, near Frome, to Shepton Mallett in the County of Somerset.
Cambridge Award Act 1856	19 & 20 Vict. c. xvii	5 June 1856
An Act to confirm an Award for the Settlement of Matters in difference between the University and Borough of Cambridge, and for other Purposes connected therewith.
Ulster, Portadown and Dungannon Railways Act 1856	19 & 20 Vict. c. xviii	5 June 1856
An Act to enable the Ulster Railway Company to subscribe towards the Undertaking of the Portadown and Dungannon Railway Company, and to authorize certain Arrangements between the said Companies, and for other Purposes.
Filey Waterworks Act 1856 (repealed)	19 & 20 Vict. c. xix	5 June 1856
An Act for supplying with Water the Town of Filey and the Environs and Neighbourhood thereof, and other Places in the East and North Ridings of the County of York, and for authorizing the Purchase of the Filey Gasworks, and for supplying the said Town with Gas; and for other Purposes. (Repealed by Filey Water and Gas Act 1898 (61 & 62 Vict. c. ccxxx))
Wakefield Gas Act 1856 (repealed)	19 & 20 Vict. c. xx	5 June 1856
An Act to empower the Wakefield Gaslight Company to raise a further Sum of Money. (Repealed by West Yorkshire Act 1980 (c.xiv))
Worksop Gas Act 1856	19 & 20 Vict. c. xxi	5 June 1856
An Act for incorporating the Worksop Gas Company.
Llanidloes and Newtown Railway Deviation Act 1856	19 & 20 Vict. c. xxii	5 June 1856
An Act to amend and extend the Provisions of "The Llanidloes and Newtown Railway Act, 1853;" (Note: Llanidloes and Newtown Railway Act 1853 (16 & 17 Vict. c. cxliii)) and to enable the Llanidloes and Newtown Railway Company to make certain Deviations in their authorized Line and Levels, and for other Purposes.
Boston Gas Amendment Act 1856	19 & 20 Vict. c. xxiii	5 June 1856
An Act to confer further Powers on the Boston Gaslight and Coke Company.
East of Fife Railway (Deviation) Act 1856	19 & 20 Vict. c. xxiv	5 June 1856
An Act to enable the East of Fife Railway Company to make a Deviation in the Line of their Railway, and for other Purposes.
Leicester and Welford Road Act 1856	19 & 20 Vict. c. xxv	5 June 1856
An Act for continuing the Term and amending and extending the Provisions of the Act (Note: Road from Welford Bridge Act 1825 (6 Geo. 4. c. lxxxii)) relating to the Leicester and Welford Turnpike Road, in the Counties of Leicester and Northampton.
Gravesend Improvement Act 1856 (repealed)	19 & 20 Vict. c. xxvi	5 June 1856
An Act for more effectually paving, cleansing, lighting, and otherwise improving the Town of Gravesend in the County of Kent. (Repealed by County of Kent Act 1981 (c.xviii))
Scarborough Waterworks Amendment Act 1856	19 & 20 Vict. c. xxvii	5 June 1856
An Act to enable the Scarborough Waterworks Company to raise a further Sum of Money, and to extend the Limits for the Supply of Water, and to amend the Provisions of the Act (Note: Scarborough and Falsegrave Water Act 1845 (8 & 9 Vict. c. lxviii)) relating to such Company.
Sleaford and Tattershall Road Act 1856	19 & 20 Vict. c. xxviii	5 June 1856
An Act to repeal the Acts relating to the Sleaford and Tattershall Turnpike Road, and to make other Provisions in lieu thereof.
Bath Gas Act 1856	19 & 20 Vict. c. xxix	23 June 1856
An Act to confer further Powers on the Bath Gaslight and Coke Company.
Cheltenham Gas Act 1856	19 & 20 Vict. c. xxx	23 June 1856
An Act to confer further Powers on the Cheltenham Gaslight and Coke Company.
Crowland and Eye Turnpike Road Act 1856	19 & 20 Vict. c. xxxi	23 June 1856
An Act for continuing the Term and amending the Provisions of the Act (Note: Road from Crowland to Eye Act 1817 (57 Geo. 3. c. liv)) for making and maintaining a Turnpike Road from the Town of Crowland in the County of Lincoln to the Town of Eye in the County of Northampton.
Edinburgh Municipality Extension Act 1856 (repealed)	19 & 20 Vict. c. xxxii	23 June 1856
An Act to extend the Municipal Boundaries of the City of Edinburgh, to transfer the Powers of the Commissioners of Police to the Magistrates and Council, and for other Purposes relating to the Municipality of the said City. (Repealed by Edinburgh Municipal and Police Act 1879 (42 & 43 Vict. c. cxxxii))
Cork and Youghal Railway Amendment Act 1856	19 & 20 Vict. c. xxxiii	23 June 1856
An Act to authorize the Cork and Youghal Railway Company to extend their Railway into Cork, and for other Purposes.
Banbridge Junction Railway Act 1856	19 & 20 Vict. c. xxxiv	23 June 1856
An Act for altering the Name of the Banbridge, Newry, Dublin, and Belfast Junction Railway Company to the Name "The Banbridge Junction Railway Company," for increasing their Capital and extending their Powers, and for other Purposes.
Glasgow Court Houses Act 1856	19 & 20 Vict. c. xxxv	23 June 1856
An Act for enlarging and improving the Justiciary Court House, and Court Houses and Public Buildings of the City of Glasgow and County of Lanark, for erecting additional Buildings, for amending the Act (Note: Glasgow Judicial Buildings Act 1836 (6 & 7 Will. 4. c. xxiv)) relating thereto, and for other Purposes.
Dewsbury, Batley and Heckmondwike Waterworks Act 1856	19 & 20 Vict. c. xxxvi	23 June 1856
An Act for making better Provision for supplying the Districts of Dewsbury, Batley, and Heckmondwike with Water, and for confirming an Agreement between the Local Boards of Health of those Districts; and for other Purposes.
Kettering and Newport Pagnell Turnpike Road Act 1856	19 & 20 Vict. c. xxxvii	23 June 1856
An Act for the Continuance and Regulation of the Kettering and Newport Pagnell Turnpike Road Trust.
Coventry Gas Act 1856	19 & 20 Vict. c. xxxviii	23 June 1856
An Act to amend the Provisions and extend the Limits of the Act (Note: Coventry Gas Act 1821 (1 & 2 Geo. 4. c. l)) relating to the City of Coventry Gaslight Company.
Stockton and Middlesbrough Road Act 1856	19 & 20 Vict. c. xxxix	23 June 1856
An Act to authorize the making of a Turnpike Road from the Township of Thomaby to Middlesbrough in the North Riding of the County of York, with a Bridge over a Creek or Arm of the River Tees, and for other Purposes.
Alford Valley Railway Act 1856	19 & 20 Vict. c. xl	23 June 1856
An Act to authorize the making of a Railway from the Great North of Scotland Railway to Afford in the County of Aberdeen, to be called "The Alford Valley Railway."
Saint Ives and West Cornwall Junction Railway Act 1856 (repealed)	19 & 20 Vict. c. xli	23 June 1856
An Act to amend "The Saint Ives and West Cornwall Junction Railway Act, 1853." (Note: Saint Ives and West Cornwall Junction Railway Act 1853 (16 & 17 Vict. c. clv)) (Repealed by Statute Law (Repeals) Act 2013 (c. 2))
Shrewsbury Waterworks Act 1856	19 & 20 Vict. c. xlii	23 June 1856
An Act to make further Provision for supplying with Water the Borough of Shrewsbury in the County of Salop.
Barnsdale and Leeds Turnpike Road Act 1856	19 & 20 Vict. c. xliii	23 June 1856
An Act to amend an Act passed in the 7th and 8th Years of the Reign of His late Majesty King George the Fourth, intituled "An Act to alter, amend, and enlarge the Powers and Provisions of an Act relating to the Road from Barnsdale through Pontefract to Thwaite Gate near Leeds in the West Riding of the County of York," (Note: Barnsdale and Thwaite Gate, and Leeds and Wakefield Roads Act 1827 (7 & 8 Geo. 4. c. lxxii)) and to continue the Term thereby granted.
Fleetwood, Preston and West Riding Junction Railway Act 1856	19 & 20 Vict. c. xliv	23 June 1856
An Act for regulating the Capital of the Fleetwood, Preston, and West Riding Junction Railway Company, for making further Provision with respect to Tolls to be taken on the Railway, and for other Purposes.
Vale of Clwyd Railway Act 1856	19 & 20 Vict. c. xlv	23 June 1856
An Act for making a Railway from the Chester and Holyhead Railway at or near to Rhyl in the County of Flint to the Town of Denbigh in the County of Denbigh, to be called "The Vale of Clwyd Railway."
Antrim and Coleraine Turnpikes Abolition Act 1856	19 & 20 Vict. c. xlvi	23 June 1856
An Act to discontinue the taking of Toll on the Turnpike Roads leading from the Town of Antrim towards Coleraine, and to provide for the future Maintenance of such Roads.
Shrewsbury and Hereford Railway Act 1856	19 & 20 Vict. c. xlvii	23 June 1856
An Act to amend and consolidate the Acts relating to the Shrewsbury and Hereford Railway Company, to enable that Company to raise further Sums of Money, to acquire additional Lands; and for other Purposes.
Cork Bridge, Waterworks and Improvement Act 1856	19 & 20 Vict. c. xlviii	23 June 1856
An Act to enable the Mayor, Aldermen, and Burgesses of the Borough of Cork to remove certain Bridges, and to build new Bridges in lieu thereof; to confirm certain Arrangements with the Cork Pipe Water Trustees; to provide the necessary Funds for affording an improved Supply of Water at Cork; to alter, amend, and enlarge certain Powers and Provisions of the Cork Improvement Act, 1852; and for other Purposes.
Knaresborough and Green Hammerton Turnpike Road Act 1856	19 & 20 Vict. c. xlix	23 June 1856
An Act to amend and extend the Provisions of the several Acts relating to the Knaresbrough and Green Hammerton Turnpike Road in the County of York, and to create a further Term therein; and for other Purposes.
Knaresborough and Pateley Bridge Turnpike Road Act 1856	19 & 20 Vict. c. l	23 June 1856
An Act to amend and extend the Provisions of the Act (Note: Road from Knaresborough to Ripon and Pateley Bridge Act 1826 (7 Geo. 4. c. xiv)) relating to the Knaresbrough and Pateley Bridge Turnpike Road, and to create a further Term therein, and for other Purposes.
Eastern Counties Railway Act 1856 (repealed)	19 & 20 Vict. c. li	23 June 1856
An Act for regulating the Capital and Mortgage Debt of the Eastern Counties Railway Company; and for other Purposes. (Repealed by Great Eastern Railway Act 1862 (25 & 26 Vict. c. ccxxiii))
Hampstead Junction Railway (Extension of Time) Act 1856	19 & 20 Vict. c. lii	23 June 1856
An Act for extending the Time for the Completion of the Works authorized by "The Hampstead Junction Railway Act, 1853." (Note: Hampstead Junction Railway Act 1853 (16 & 17 Vict. c. ccxxii))
Lowestoft and Beccles Railway Act 1856	19 & 20 Vict. c. liii	23 June 1856
An Act for making a Railway from Lowestoft to join the East Suffolk Railway in the Parish of Beccles, all in the County of Suffolk, and for other Purposes connected therewith.
Midland Railway Act 1856	19 & 20 Vict. c. liv	23 June 1856
An Act to enable the Midland Railway Company to raise additional Capital, and for other Purposes.
Rotherham and Barnby Moor Road (Yorkshire, Nottinghamshire) Act 1856	19 & 20 Vict. c. lv	30 June 1856
An Act for more effectually repairing the Road from Barnby Moor in the County of Nottingham to Maltby in the County of York, and from Whiston to Rotherham in the said County of York.
Glasgow Paving Act 1856 (repealed)	19 & 20 Vict. c. lvi	30 June 1856
An Act for better paving the City of Glasgow, and for other Purposes in relation to the Statute Labour of tho said City. (Repealed by Glasgow Police Act 1862 (25 & 26 Vict. c. cciv))
Wolverhampton Waterworks Transfer Act 1856	19 & 20 Vict. c. lvii	30 June 1856
An Act for the Transfer of the Wolverhampton Waterworks to the Wolverhampton New Waterworks Company, and for other Purposes.
Blackburn and Addingham Turnpike Road Act 1856 (repealed)	19 & 20 Vict. c. lviii	30 June 1856
An Act for repairing the Road from Blackburn in the County Palatine of Lancaster to Addingham, and Cocking End in the West Riding of the County of York, and the Road from Old Accrington to its Junction with such Road in Habergham Eaves in the said County of Lancaster. (Repealed by Annual Turnpike Acts Continuance Act 1878 (41 & 42 Vict. c. 62))
West Ham Gas Company Act 1856	19 & 20 Vict. c. lix	30 June 1856
An Act to incorporate "The West Ham Gas Company," to enable them to raise further Money, to confirm a Contract between the said Company and the Commercial Gas Company, and for other Purposes.
Honiton and Sidmouth Turnpike Road Act 1856	19 & 20 Vict. c. lx	30 June 1856
An Act to continue the Honiton and Sidmouth Turnpike Trust, and for other Purposes.
Colne Valley and Halstead Railway Act 1856	19 & 20 Vict. c. lxi	30 June 1856
An Act for making a Railway from the Chappel Station of the Colchester, Stour Valley, Sudbury, and Halstead Railway to Halstead in the County of Essex, and for other Purposes.
Wandsworth and Putney Gas Act 1856	19 & 20 Vict. c. lxii	30 June 1856
An Act to incorporate "The Wandsworth and Putney Gaslight and Coke Company," and for other Purposes.
North British Railway (Finance and Bridge) Act 1856 (repealed)	19 & 20 Vict. c. lxiii	30 June 1856
An Act to authorize the North British Railway Company to raise more Money, and to build a Bridge over Leith Wynd in Edinburgh, and for other Purposes. (Repealed by North British Railway Consolidation Act 1858 (21 & 22 Vict. c. cix))
Penrith and Cockermouth Roads Act 1856	19 & 20 Vict. c. lxiv	30 June 1856
An Act for more effectually repairing the Road from Penrith to Cockermouth, and other Roads connected therewith, and for making and maintaining several new Roads, all in the County of Cumberland.
Deeping Fen Drainage Act 1856	19 & 20 Vict. c. lxv	30 June 1856
An Act to consolidate the Drainage Trusts in Deeping Fen in the County of Lincoln, and for other Purposes relating to the said Fen.
Stockport and Warrington Road Act 1856	19 & 20 Vict. c. lxvi	30 June 1856
An Act for more effectually repairing certain Roads in the County of Chester, of which the Short Title is "Stockport and Warrington Road Act, 1856." (Note: Stockport and Warrington Road Act 1856 (19 & 20 Vict. c. lxvi))
Elgin and Lossiemouth Harbour Act 1856	19 & 20 Vict. c. lxvii	30 June 1856
An Act for enlarging and improving the Elgin and Lossiemouth Harbour, for raising a further Sum of Money, and for other Purposes.
Carmarthen and Cardigan Railway (Deviation) Act 1856	19 & 20 Vict. c. lxviii	30 June 1856
An Act to enable the Carmarthen and Cardigan Railway Company to make a Deviation of a Portion of their Line of Railway, and to abandon Parts thereof, and to grant further Powers to the Company; and for other Purposes.
Luton, Dunstable and Welwyn Junction Railway Act 1856	19 & 20 Vict. c. lxix	7 July 1856
An Act to enable the Luton, Dunstable, and Welwyn Junction Railway Company to alter the present authorized Junction of their Railway with the Leighton Buzzard and Dunstable Branch of the London and North-western Railway; and for other Purposes.
Scottish Drainage and Improvement Company's Act 1856	19 & 20 Vict. c. lxx	7 July 1856
An Act for incorporating the Scottish Drainage and Improvement Company, and to afford greater Facilities for the Improvement of Land in Scotland.
Lymington Railway Act 1856	19 & 20 Vict. c. lxxi	7 July 1856
An Act for making a Railway from Lymington in the County of Southampton to the London and South-western Railway at Brockenhurst in the same County, to be called the "Lymington Railway," with a Landing Place at Lymington aforesaid, and for other Purposes.
Brough and Eamont Bridge Turnpike Act 1856	19 & 20 Vict. c. lxxii	7 July 1856
An Act to repeal the Acts relating to the Brough and Eamont Bridge Turnpike Road, and to make other Provisions in lieu thereof.
Donington (Lincolnshire) Turnpike Roads Act 1856 (repealed)	19 & 20 Vict. c. lxxiii	7 July 1856
An Act to renew the Term, and continue, amend, and enlarge the Powers, of an Act passed in the Third Year of the Reign of His Majesty King George the Fourth, intituled "An Act for repairing and amending the Roads from Donington High Bridge to Hale Drove, and to the Eighth Milestone in the Parish of Wigtoft, and to Langret Ferry in the County of Lincoln." (Note: Roads from Donington High Bridge Act 1822 (3 Geo. 4. c. ix)) (Repealed by Annual Turnpike Acts Continuance Act 1874 (37 & 38 Vict. c. 95))
Clay Cross Waterworks Act 1856	19 & 20 Vict. c. lxxiv	7 July 1856
An Act for supplying with Water the Inhabitants of Clay Cross, and the Neighbourhood, in the County of Derby.
Sittingbourne and Sheerness Railway Act 1856	19 & 20 Vict. c. lxxv	7 July 1856
An Act for making a Railway from Sittingbourne to Sheerness, all in the County of Kent; and for other Purposes.
London, Tilbury and Southend Railway (Extension and Branches) Act 1856	19 & 20 Vict. c. lxxvi	7 July 1856
An Act to enable the Eastern Counties and London and Blackwall Railway Companies to extend the London, Tilbury, and Southend Extension Railway to the London and Blackwall Railway, with Branches therefrom, and to authorize certain Arrangements with reference thereto; and for other Purposes.
Middlesbrough Improvement Act 1856 (repealed)	19 & 20 Vict. c. lxxvii	7 July 1856
An Act to authorize the Division of the Borough of Middlesbrough into Wards; to enable the Local Board of Health of the District of Middlesbrough to purchase Gasworks and light the District, and to enlarge the Market Place; to enable the Corporation to establish a public Wharf, and a Passage over the River Tees; to confer other Powers on the Local Board and the Corporation; and for other Purposes. (Repealed by Middlesbrough Corporation Act 1933 (23 & 24 Geo. 5. c. lxxxiii))
Torquay Waterworks Act 1856	19 & 20 Vict. c. lxxviii	7 July 1856
An Act for the better Supply of the Town of Torquay and the Neighbourhood thereof with Water, and for other Purposes.
Yarmouth and Haddiscoe Railway Act 1856	19 & 20 Vict. c. lxxix	7 July 1856
An Act for making a Railway from Yarmouth to the East Suffolk Railway in the Parish of Haddiscoe, with a Branch Railway connected therewith, and for other Purposes.
Leeds Waterworks (Wharfe Supply) Act 1856 (repealed)	19 & 20 Vict. c. lxxx	7 July 1856
An Act to sanction a Supply of Water to the Town and Neighbourhood of Leeds from the River Wharfe. (Repealed by Leeds Corporation (Consolidation) Act 1905 (5 Edw. 7. c. i))
Eastern Union Railway Act 1856 (repealed)	19 & 20 Vict. c. lxxxi	7 July 1856
An Act to attach further Advantages to certain Portions of the Capital of the Eastern Union Railway Company. (Repealed by Great Eastern Railway Act 1862 (25 & 26 Vict. c. ccxxiii))
Bawtry and Tinsley Road Act 1856	19 & 20 Vict. c. lxxxii	7 July 1856
An Act to repeal "An Act for amending and maintaining the Turnpike Road from Bawtry, through the town of Tinsley, to the Road from Rotherham to Sheffield in the West Riding of the County of York," (Note: Bawtry and Tinsley Turnpike Road Act 1825 (6 Geo. 4. c. xc)) and to make other Provisions in lieu thereof.
Godley Lane and Northowram Road Act 1856	19 & 20 Vict. c. lxxxiii	7 July 1856
An Act for continuing the Term and amending and extending the Provisions of the Act (Note: Godley Lane Head and Northowram Road (Yorkshire, West Riding) Act 1827 (7 & 8 Geo. 4. c. vi)) relating to the Godley Lane Turnpike Road in the West Riding of the County of York.
Halifax and Huddersfield Turnpike Road Act 1856 (repealed)	19 & 20 Vict. c. lxxxiv	14 July 1856
An Act to repeal the Act (Note: Halifax to Sheffield Road (First District) Act 1824 (5 Geo. 4. c. ciii)) relating to the Turnpike Road from Halifax to Huddersfield in the West Riding of the County of York, and to grant a further Term in the said Roads, and further Powers for the Management thereof, and other Purposes. (Repealed by Annual Turnpike Acts Continuance Act 1867 (30 & 31 Vict. c. 121))
Renfrewshire Turnpike Roads Act 1856	19 & 20 Vict. c. lxxxv	14 July 1856
An Act for carrying into effect certain Arrangement between the Trustees of the Renfrewshire Turnpike Roads and the Lord Provost, Magistrates, and Council, and Police and Statute Labour Committee, of Glasgow; and for continuing in other respects the Acts relating to the said Roads.
Morayshire Railway (Extension) Act 1856	19 & 20 Vict. c. lxxxvi	14 July 1856
An Act to enable the Morayshire Railway Company to construct a Railway from Orton to Craigellachie, and for other Purposes.
West London and Crystal Palace Railway Act 1856	19 & 20 Vict. c. lxxxvii	14 July 1856
An Act for authorizing Traffic Arrangements between the West End of London and Crystal Palace and the London Brighton, and South Coast Railway Companies, the Regulation and Increase of Capital, and for other Purposes.
Bagenalstown and Wexford Railway Act 1856	19 & 20 Vict. c. lxxxviii	14 July 1856
An Act to afford Facilities to the Bagenalstown and Wexford Railway Company for raising the Funds necessary to enable them to execute their Undertaking, and for other Purposes.
Monmouth Roads Act 1856	19 & 20 Vict. c. lxxxix	14 July 1856
An Act for more effectually repairing several Roads leading to and from the Town of Monmouth, and for making several Lines of Road to communicate therewith, in the Counties of Monmouth, Gloucester, and Hereford.
Bournemouth Improvement Act 1856 (repealed)	19 & 20 Vict. c. xc	14 July 1856
An Act for the Improvement of Part of the District of St. Peter Bournemouth in the Parishes of Christchurch and Holdenhurst in the Count of Southampton, and for providing a Pier there. (Repealed by Bournemouth Borough Council Act 1985 (c. v))
Edinburgh Water Company's Act 1856 (repealed)	19 & 20 Vict. c. xci	14 July 1856
An Act for better supplying with Water the City of Edinburgh and Town and Port of Leith and Places adjacent. (Repealed by Edinburgh Corporation Order Confirmation Act 1958 (7 & 8 Eliz. 2. c. v))
Epsom and Leatherhead Railway Act 1856	19 & 20 Vict. c. xcii	14 July 1856
An Act for making a Railway from the Epsom Branch of the London, Brighton, and South Coast Railway at Epsom to Leatherhead.
Salisbury Railway and Market House Act 1856 (repealed)	19 & 20 Vict. c. xciii	14 July 1856
An Act for incorporating the Salisbury Railway and Market House Company; for authorizing them to make and maintain a Railway and a Market House at Salisbury; and for other Purposes. (Repealed by Salisbury Railway and Market House Act 1969 (c. xviii))
Stockton and Darlington and Newcastle and Carlisle Union Railway Act 1856	19 & 20 Vict. c. xciv	14 July 1856
An Act for making a Railway from the Stocksfield Station of the Newcastle-upon-Tyne and Carlisle Railway to the Stockton and Darlington Railway, near Conside Ironworks, with a Branch to the Derwent Iron Company's Railway; and for other Purposes.
Swansea Vale Railway Extension Act 1856	19 & 20 Vict. c. xcv	14 July 1856
An Act to enable the Swansea Vale Railway Company to make Extension and Branch Railways, and for other Purposes.
Lewes, Eastbourne and Hailsham Turnpike Road Act 1856	19 & 20 Vict. c. xcvi	14 July 1856
An Act to repeal the Act (Note: Lewes and Eastbourne, and Polegate and Hailsham Roads Act 1819 (59 Geo. 3. c. x)) for more effectually makings straightening, repairing, and improving the Roads from near the Town of Lewes to Polegate in the Parish of Hailsham, and from thence to Eastbourne, and to Polegate to Hailsham Common, in the County of Sussex, and to make other Provisions in lieu thereof.
Conway and Llandudno Turnpike Road Act 1856	19 & 20 Vict. c. xcvii	14 July 1856
An Act for making and maintaining a Turnpike Road from Conway to Llandudno in the County of Carnarvon, and for other Purposes.
West of Fife Mineral Railway Act 1856	19 & 20 Vict. c. xcviii	14 July 1856
An Act for making a Railway from Dunfermline to Killairnie with a Branch to Kingseat in the County of Fife, to be called "The West of Fife Mineral Railway."
Maybole and Girvan Railway Act 1856	19 & 20 Vict. c. xcix	14 July 1856
An Act for making a Railway from the Town of Maybole to the Town and Harbour of Girvan, to be called "The Maybole and Girvan Railway."
Forest of Dean Central Railway Act 1856	19 & 20 Vict. c. c	14 July 1856
An Act for making a Railway from the South Wales Railway near Brimspill in the Parish of Awre to Howbeach Valley in the Forest of Dean, with Branches; and for other Purposes.
Ceylon Railway Company's Act 1856 (repealed)	19 & 20 Vict. c. ci	14 July 1856
An Act for incorporating the Ceylon Railway Company, and for other Purposes connected therewith. (Repealed by Statute Law (Repeals) Act 2013 (c. 2))
Somerset Central Railway (Glastonbury to Bruton) Act 1856	19 & 20 Vict. c. cii	21 July 1856
An Act for enabling the Somerset Central Railway Company to construct a Railway from Glastonbury to near Bruton, and for other Purposes.
Wem and Bronygarth Roads Act 1856 (repealed)	19 & 20 Vict. c. ciii	21 July 1856
An Act for more effectually repairing the Road leading from Wem to the Lime Rocks at Bronygarth in the County of Salop, and for making several Lines of Road connected with the same in the Counties of Salop and Denbigh. (Repealed by Wem and Bronygarth Roads Act 1860 (23 & 24 Vict. c. viii))
Cleobury District Roads Act 1856	19 & 20 Vict. c. civ	21 July 1856
An Act for continuing the Term and amending and extending the Provisions of the Act (Note: Roads from Bridgnorth to Cleobury Mortimer Act 1825 (6 Geo. 4. c. xlix)) relating to the Cleobury North and Ditton Priors District and the Cleobury Mortimer District of Turnpike Roads, in the Counties of Salop and Worcester.
Wimbledon and Croydon Railway Act 1856	19 & 20 Vict. c. cv	21 July 1856
An Act for authorizing a Lease of the Wimbledon and Croydon Railway, and for authorizing the Purchase of additional Lands and the raising of additional Capital by the Wimbledon and Croydon Railway Company; and for other Purposes.
Stirling and Dunfermline Railway Act 1856	19 & 20 Vict. c. cvi	21 July 1856
An Act to enable the Stirling and Dunfermline Railway Company to create additional Shares in their Undertaking; and for other Purposes.
London Printing and Publishing Company's Act 1856 (repealed)	19 & 20 Vict. c. cvii	21 July 1856
An Act to amend the Constitution of "The London Printing and Publishing Company, Limited." (Repealed by Statute Law (Repeals) Act 2013 (c. 2))
Luton District Road Act 1856	19 & 20 Vict. c. cviii	21 July 1856
An Act to amend certain Acts relating to the Luton District Turnpike Road, and make other Provisions in lieu thereof.
Metropolitan Railway (Great Northern Branch and Amendment) Act 1856	19 & 20 Vict. c. cix	21 July 1856
An Act to extend the Times limited for certain Purposes by the Acts relating to the Metropolitan Railway, and to enable the Metropolitan Railway Company to form a Junction with the Great Northern Railway, and for other Purposes.
Inverness and Aberdeen Junction Railway Act 1856 (repealed)	19 & 20 Vict. c. cx	21 July 1856
An Act for making a Railway from the Town of Nairn to the Town of Keith. (Repealed by Inverness and Aberdeen Junction Railway Act 1860 (23 & 24 Vict. c. ix))
Severn Valley Railway Act 1856	19 & 20 Vict. c. cxi	21 July 1856
An Act for authorizing Deviations from the authorized Line of the Severn Valley Railway, and for making further Provision with respect to Shares in the Capital of the Severn Valley Railway Company, and for facilitating the Completion of their Undertaking, and for other Purposes.
Isle of Wight Ferry Act 1856 (repealed)	19 & 20 Vict. c. cxii	21 July 1856
An Act for establishing and maintaining a Ferry and Floating Bridge between Stokes Bay and Ryde in the County of Southampton, with Landing Places and Approaches thereto. (Repealed by Pier and Harbour Orders Confirmation Act 1916 (6 & 7 Geo. 5. c. xxxvii))
Dunblane, Doune and Callander Railway Act 1856	19 & 20 Vict. c. cxiii	21 July 1856
An Act for making a Railway from the Scottish Central Railway at Dunblane by Doune to Callander, to be called "The Dunblane, Doune, and Callander Railway."
Castle Douglas and Dumfries Railway Act 1856	19 & 20 Vict. c. cxiv	21 July 1856
An Act for making a Railway from Castle Douglas, by Dalbeattie, to the Glasgow and South-western Railway at Dumfries, and for other Purposes.
Leeds Improvement Amendment Act 1856	19 & 20 Vict. c. cxv	21 July 1856
An Act for granting further Powers for lighting, cleansing, sewering, and improving the Borough of Leeds, and for other Purposes.
Grand Junction Waterworks Act 1856	19 & 20 Vict. c. cxvi	21 July 1856
An Act for regulating the Rates and Charges to be taken by the Grand Junction Waterworks Company for a Supply of Water to Parts of the Parish of Paddington, and for other Purposes.
Crystal Palace Company's Act 1856 (repealed)	19 & 20 Vict. c. cxvii	21 July 1856
An Act to grant further lowers to the Crystal Palace Company for the raising of Capital, for the internal Management of their Undertaking, and with respect to Dulwich Wood. (Repealed by London County Council (Crystal Palace) Act 1951 (14 & 15 Geo. 6. c. xxviii))
Gloucester Gaslight Company's Act 1856	19 & 20 Vict. c. cxviii	21 July 1856
An Act to consolidate the Powers of the Gloucester Gaslight Company, to enable them to raise Money, and for other Purposes.
Thames Haven Dock Company's Act 1856	19 & 20 Vict. c. cxix	21 July 1856
An Act for the making of a Dock and Works at Thames Haven, and for other Purposes.
London and South Western Railway (Exeter Extension) Act 1856	19 & 20 Vict. c. cxx	21 July 1856
An Act for the making by the London and South-western Railway Company of a Railway from Yeovil to Exeter, to be called "The Exeter Extension Railway;" and for other Purposes.
East Indian Railway Company Act 1856 (repealed)	19 & 20 Vict. c. cxxi	21 July 1856
An Act to amend the Acts relating to the East Indian Railway Company. (Repealed by Statute Law (Repeals) Act 2013 (c. 2))
Ely Tidal Harbour and Railway (Glamorgan) Act 1856	19 & 20 Vict. c. cxxii	21 July 1856
An Act for making a Railway from the Taff Vale Railway to the River Ely in the County of Glamorgan, for converting Part of the said River into a tidal Harbour and regulating the Access thereto, for authorising Arrangements with the Taff Vale Railway Company; and for other Purposes.
London and North Western Railway (Shrewsbury Station) Act 1856	19 & 20 Vict. c. cxxiii	21 July 1856
An Act for altering the Crewe and Shrewsbury Line of the London and North-western Railway, for making Provision with respect to Station Accommodation at Shrewsbury, and for other Purposes.
Londonderry and Enniskillen Railway Act 1856	19 & 20 Vict. c. cxxiv	21 July 1856
An Act to enable the Londonderry and Enniskillen Railway Company to create Preference Shares with Priority of Dividend over all the existing Shares of the Company, and for other Purposes.
Mid-Kent Railway (Bromley to Saint Mary Cray) Act 1856	19 & 20 Vict. c. cxxv	21 July 1856
An Act for making a Railway from the authorized line of the West End of London and Crystal Palace Railway (Extension to Bromley and Farnborough) at Shortlands in the Parish of Beckenham in the County of Kent to Saint Mary Cray in the same County.
Oxford, Worcester and Wolverhampton Railway (Capital) Act 1856	19 & 20 Vict. c. cxxvi	21 July 1856
An Act to enable the Oxford, Worcester, and Wolverhampton Railway Company to raise further Money for the Completion of the Broad Gauge, and for other Purposes; and to convert their Mortgage Debt into Stock.
Uttoxeter and Blyth Marsh Turnpike Road Act 1856	19 & 20 Vict. c. cxxvii	21 July 1856
An Act to repeal an Act passed in the Fourth Year of the Reign of His late Majesty King George the Fourth, intituled "An Act for more effectually amending and keeping in repair the Roads from the Town of Uttoxeter to the Town of Newcastle-under-Lyme in the County of Stafford, so far as relates to the Uttoxeter District of the said Roads, and for making certain new Pieces of Road to communicate therewith, all in the said County of Stafford," (Note: Uttoxeter District of Roads Act 1823 (4 Geo. 4. c. lix)) and to confer larger and additional Powers and Provisions in lieu of those therein contained; and for other Purposes.
Bardney, &c. Drainage Act 1856	19 & 20 Vict. c. cxxviii	21 July 1856
An Act to amend "An Act for draining, embarking, and improving the Fen Lands and Low Grounds within the Parishes, Hamlets, Townships, or Places of Bardney, Southrow otherwise Southry, Tupholme, Bucknall, Horsington, Stixwould, Edlington, and Thimbleby, in the County of Lincoln," (Note: Lincolnshire Drainage Act 1843 (6 & 7 Vict. c. lxxvi)) and to confer further Powers on the Commissioners under such Act, and for other purposes.
Waveney Valley Railway Amendment Act 1856 (repealed)	19 & 20 Vict. c. cxxix	29 July 1856
An Act to revive and extend certain of the Powers of the Waveney Valley Railway Company with relation to their Railway. (Repealed by Great Eastern Railway (Additional Powers) Act 1863 (26 & 27 Vict. c. cxc))
West End of London and Clapham and Norwood Junction Railway Act 1856 (repealed)	19 & 20 Vict. c. cxxx	29 July 1856
An Act for authorizing the Abandonment of Parts of the authorized Lines of the Westminster Terminus Railway, and the making of other Lines of Railway in lieu thereof, and for reducing the Capital of the Westminster Terminus Railway Company; and for other Purposes. (Repealed by Statute Law (Repeals) Act 2013 (c. 2))
Severn Navigation Act 1856	19 & 20 Vict. c. cxxxi	29 July 1856
An Act to render more effectual the Powers of raising Money given by "The Severn Navigation Act, 1853," (Note: Severn Navigation Act 1853 (16 & 17 Vict. c. xlvii)) and for other Purposes.
Shrewsbury and Welchpool Railway Act 1856 or the Shrewsbury and Welshpool Railway Act 1856	19 & 20 Vict. c. cxxxii	29 July 1856
An Act for making a Railway from the Oswestry and Newtown Railway in the Parish of Buttington in the County of Montgomery to Shrewsbury, with a Branch thereout to Minsterley in the County of Salop, and for other Purposes.
Imprisoned Debtors Discharge Society's Act 1856 (repealed)	19 & 20 Vict. c. cxxxiii	29 July 1856
An Act for extending the Operations of the Society for the Discharge and Relief of Persons imprisoned for small Debts throughout England and Wales. (Repealed by Statute Law (Repeals) Act 2013 (c. 2))
Scottish North Eastern Railway Act 1856	19 & 20 Vict. c. cxxxiv	29 July 1856
An Act to unite and amalgamate the Undertaking of the Scottish Midland Junction Railway Company with the Undertaking of the Aberdeen Railway Company, to be thenceforth called "The Scottish North-eastern Railway Company," and to regulate the Management of and confer additional Powers on the united Company, and for other Purposes.
Dorset Central Railway Act 1856	19 & 20 Vict. c. cxxxv	29 July 1856
An Act for making a Railway from the Southampton and Dorchester Railway to Blandford Saint Mary in the County of Dorset, and for other Purposes.
Perth, Almond Valley and Methven Railway Act 1856	19 & 20 Vict. c. cxxxvi	29 July 1856
An Act for making a Railway from the Scottish Midland Junction Railway, near the Dunkeld Road Bridge, to Methven, in the County of Perth.
Oxford, Worcester and Wolverhampton Railway (Extension of Time) Act 1856	19 & 20 Vict. c. cxxxvii	29 July 1856
An Act to extend the Time limited for completing the Oxford, Worcester, and Wolverhampton Railway, and for adapting the same to the Broad Gauge, and for other Purposes.
Perth Burgh and Harbour (No. 2) Act 1856	19 & 20 Vict. c. cxxxviii	29 July 1856
An Act to provide for the Arrangement of the financial Affairs of the City of Perth; for the Maintenance of the Port and Harbour; and for other Purposes therewith connected.
Scottish Central Railway (Denny Branches) Act 1856 (repealed)	19 & 20 Vict. c. cxxxix	29 July 1856
An Act to enable the Scottish Central Railway Company to make Branch Railways to the Town of Denny in the County of Stirling. (Repealed by Scottish Central Railway Consolidation Act 1859 (22 & 23 Vict. c. lxxxiii))

=== Private acts ===
Short title	Citation	Royal assent
Long title
Doddington Rectory Division (Amendment) Act 1856 or the Doddington Rectory Division Act 1856	19 & 20 Vict. c. 1 Pr.	5 June 1856
An Act to amend an Act made and passed in the Tenth Year of the Reign of Her present Majesty, intituled "An Act to divide the Parish and Rectory of Doddington otherwise Dornington into Three separate and distinct Parishes and Rectories, and to endow the same out of the Revenues of that Rectory, and to make Provisions for the further Division of such Rectories and Parishes, and for other Purposes connected therewith." (Note: Doddington Rectory Division Act 1847 (10 & 11 Vict. c. 3 Pr.))
Thornhill's Estate Act 1856	19 & 20 Vict. c. 2 Pr.	23 June 1856
An Act for continuing in force, during the Minority of Mrs. Clara Clarke Thornhill, the Wife of William Capel Clarke Thornhill, of Swakeleys in the County of Middlesex, Esquire, the Powers conferred by "Thornhill's Estate Act, 1854," (Note: Thornhill's Estate Act 1854 (17 & 18 Vict. c. 5 Pr.)) and for other Purposes.
Wainman's Estate Act 1856	19 & 20 Vict. c. 3 Pr.	23 June 1856
An Act for authorizing the Trustees under the Will of William Wainman Esquire, deceased, to grant Leases, and to make Sales, Exchanges, and Partition of the Real Estates devised by or subject to the Trusts of the same Will; and for other purposes.
Blenheim Estate Act 1856	19 & 20 Vict. c. 4 Pr.	23 June 1856
An Act for giving effect to a Compromise relating to the Estate of the Most Noble George Fourth Duke of Marlborough, deceased, and, with a view thereto, for extinguishing the demisable Quality of certain Copyhold Hereditaments, Parcels of the Manors comprised in the Estates and Hereditaments settled on the Dukedom, and for creating a Term of Years in a Portion of the said Copyhold Hereditaments.
Swinnerton's Name Act 1856	19 & 20 Vict. c. 5 Pr.	23 June 1856
An Act to authorize Sir Lionel Milborne Swinnerton Baronet and his Issue to assume and bear the Surname of Pilkington jointly with the Surnames of Milborne and Swinnerton, and to be called by the Surnames of Milborne Swinnerton Pilkington.
Ingham's Estate Act 1856	19 & 20 Vict. c. 6 Pr.	30 June 1856
An Act for vesting in Trustees the undivided Parts, subject to the Limitations of the Wills of Benjamin Inham deceased and Joshua Ingham deceased respectively, of Estates in the West Riding of the County of York, and for authorizing Partitions of Parts of those Estates, and for authorizing Leases and Sales of Parts of those Estates, and for other Purposes.
Dawson's Estate Act 1856	19 & 20 Vict. c. 7 Pr.	30 June 1856
An Act to authorize the granting of Leases of Parts of the Freehold, Copyhold, and Leasehold Estates of the late Leonard Lewen Wheatley Esquire, situate in the several Parishes of Saint Lawrence and Saint Peter the Apostle in the Isle of Thanet, of Meopham near Gravesend, and Ash next Sandwich, and elsewhere in the County of Kent, and within the Manor of Stepney otherwise Stebunheath Ratcliffe in the Parish of Saint Dunstan Stepney, and elsewhere in the County of Middlesex.
Butterwick's Estate Act 1856	19 & 20 Vict. c. 8 Pr.	14 July 1856
An Act to enable the Trustees of the Will of Matthew Butterwick Esquire to sell the Rectory and Tithes of Thirsk, held by Lease for Lives under the Archbishop of York, and certain Policies of Assurance, and for the Investment of the Proceeds, and for other Purposes; of which the Short Title is "Butterwick's Estate Act, 1856."
Walmesley's Estate Act 1856	19 & 20 Vict. c. 9 Pr.	21 July 1856
An Act for enabling Leases for Mining, Agricultural, and Building Purposes to be made of the Estates of John Walmesley Esquire, deceased, and Sales of Portions thereof, and for other Purposes, the Short Title of which is "Walmesley's Estate Act, 1856."
Thoroton and Croft Estate Act 1856	19 & 20 Vict. c. 10 Pr.	29 July 1856
An Act for enabling Leases and Sales to be made of Lands and hereditaments in the Counties of Northumberland and Durham belonging to the Families of Thoroton and Croft, and for other Purposes, called "The Thoroton and Croft Estate Act, 1856."
Dallington Estate Act 1856	19 & 20 Vict. c. 11 Pr.	29 July 1856
An Act for vesting in Trustees the Estates of the late Sarah Reddall deceased, situate in the County of Northampton, known as the Dallington Estate, for the Purpose of enabling Leases, Sales, Exchanges, and Partitions to be made of the same; and for other Purposes.
Bell's Estate Act 1856	19 & 20 Vict. c. 12 Pr.	29 July 1856
An Act to enable the Trustees of the Will of John Bell Esquire to sell a Leasehold Estate for Lives in the County of York known as "Wildon Grange," held of the Archbishop of York, and for the Reinvestment of the Proceeds in the Purchase of Real Estates of Inheritance, of which the Short Title is "Bell's Estate Act, 1856."
Cairness Estate Amendment Act 1856	19 & 20 Vict. c. 13 Pr.	29 July 1856
An Act to amend and enlarge the Powers of an Act passed in the Twelfth and Thirteenth Years of the Reign of Her present Majesty Queen Victoria, (Note: Gordon's (Cairness) Estate Act 1849 (12 & 13 Vict. c. 14 Pr.)) intituled "An Act for authorizing the Trustees of the late Thomas Gordon to sell his Estates of Cairness and others in the County of Aberdeen, and to apply the Price thereof in Payment of the Debts and Burdens affecting the same; and for laying out the Residue of the Price in the Purchase of other Lands, to be entailed in Terms of the Trust Deed of Settlement by the said Thomas Gordon; and for other Purposes.
Brydges' Estate Act 1856	19 & 20 Vict. c. 14 Pr.	29 July 1856
An Act for enabling Partitions, Sales, Exchanges, and Leases to be made of certain Parts of the Estates devised by the Will of Sir John William Head Brydges deceased, and for other Purposes.
Shipton's Disabilities Removal Act 1856 (Note: This act was not printed by the Queen's Printer.)	19 & 20 Vict. c. 15 Pr.	7 July 1856
An Act to enable George Shipton Clerk to exercise his Office of Priest, and to hold any Benefice or Preferment in the United Church of England and Ireland.
Talbot's Divorce Act 1856	19 & 20 Vict. c. 16 Pr.	29 July 1856
An Act to dissolve the Marriage of John Talbot Esquire with Marianne his now Wife, and to enable him to marry again; and for other Purposes.
Davidson's Divorce Act 1856	19 & 20 Vict. c. 17 Pr.	29 July 1856
An Act to dissolve the Marriage of Madgwick Spicer Davidson Gentleman with Katharine Anne his now Wife, and to enable the said Madgwick Spicer Davidson to marry again; and for other Purposes therein mentioned.

=== Sources ===
- The Statutes of the United Kingdom of Great Britain and Ireland, 19 & 20 Victoria, 1856. London: Eyre & Spottiswoode. 1856 – via Internet Archive.
- Statutes at Large. London: Eyre & Spottiswoode. 1856 – via Google Books.

== See also ==
- List of acts of the Parliament of the United Kingdom
