= Statute Law (Repeals) Act 1981 =

Act of the Parliament of the United Kingdom

Statute Law (Repeals) Act 1981 (Note: Section 3.)
- Act of Parliament
- Parliament of the United Kingdom
- Long title: An Act to promote the reform of the statute law by the repeal, in accordance with recommendations of the Law Commission and the Scottish Law Commission of certain enactments which (except in so far as their effect is preserved) are no longer of practical utility.
- Citation: 1981 c. 19
- Introduced by: The Lord Chancellor (Lords)
- Territorial extent: United Kingdom; Channel Islands (in part); Isle of Man (Note: Section 2(2). The Statute Law Repeals (Isle of Man) Order 1984 (SI 1984/1692).); (Note: Section 2.)

Dates
- Royal assent: 21 May 1981
- Commencement: 21 May 1981 (Note: Section 4(b) of the Interpretation Act 1978)
Other legislation
Amends	Chester and Holyhead Railway Act 1844; Conveyancing (Scotland) Act 1874; National Galleries of Scotland Act 1906; Naval and Military War Pensions, &c. Act 1915; See § Repealed enactments
Repeals/revokes	See § Repealed enactments
Amended by	Statute Law (Repeals) Act 2008
Relates to	See Statute Law (Repeals) Act

Status: Amended

Text of statute as originally enacted

The Statute Law (Repeals) Act 1981 (c. 19) is an act of the Parliament of the United Kingdom.

As of 2026, the act remains partly in force in the United Kingdom.

== Background ==
The act implemented recommendations contained in the tenth report on statute law revision, by the Law Commission and the Scottish Law Commission.

== Provisions ==
The power conferred by section 2(3) was exercised by the Statute Law Repeals (Isle of Man) Order 1984 (SI 1984/1692).

=== Repealed enactments ===
Section 1(1) of the act repealed 244 enactments, listed in schedule 1 to the act, divided by subject into twelve parts.

==== Part I: Administration of Justice ====
Citation	Short title	Extent of repeal
23 Geo. 3. c. 45	Justiciary and Circuit Courts (Scotland) Act 1783	The whole act.
37 Geo. 3. c. 123	Unlawful Oaths Act 1797	The whole act.
39 & 40 Geo. 3. c. 94	Criminal Lunatics Act 1800	The whole act.
46 Geo. 3. c. 54	Offences at Sea Act 1806	The whole act.
50 Geo. 3. c. 102	Unlawful Oaths (Ireland) Act 1810	The whole act.
52 Geo. 3. c. 104	Unlawful Oaths Act 1812	The whole act.
57 Geo. 3. c. 53	Murders Abroad Act 1817	The whole act.
9 Geo. 4. c. 32	Civil Rights of Convicts Act 1828	The whole act.
5 & 6 Vict. c. 69	Perpetuation of Testimony Act 1842	The whole act.
20 & 21 Vict. c. 60	Irish Bankrupt and Insolvent Act 1857	In section 269, the words "or insolvent", wherever occurring, and the words "or before the commencement of the imprisonment of such insolvent".
21 & 22 Vict. c. 73	Stipendiary Magistrates Act 1858	The whole act.
28 & 29 Vict. c. 124	Admiralty Powers, &c. Act 1865	The whole act.
34 & 35 Vict. c. 112	Prevention of Crimes Act 1871	In section 6, as it applies to Northern Ireland, the words from "This section" onwards.
34 & 35 Vict. c. 112	Prevention of Crimes Act 1871	Section 9.
34 & 35 Vict. c. 112	Prevention of Crimes Act 1871	Section 17 as it applies to England and Wales; and in that section as it applies to Scotland, the words from "In Scotland, under the provisions" onwards.
34 & 35 Vict. c. 112	Prevention of Crimes Act 1871	Section 18 as it applies to Scotland; and in that section as it applies to England and Wales and to Northern Ireland, the words from "and a conviction" to "passing thereof".
34 & 35 Vict. c. 112	Prevention of Crimes Act 1871	Section 22.
35 & 36 Vict. c. 58	Bankruptcy (Ireland) Amendment Act 1872	In section 65, the words from "that any trader" to "said Act, or" and the words "trader or", wherever occurring.
35 & 36 Vict. c. 58	Bankruptcy (Ireland) Amendment Act 1872	Sections 70 and 71.
39 & 40 Vict. c. 18	Treasury Solicitor Act 1876	Sections 6 and 9.
40 & 41 Vict. c. 14	Evidence Act 1877	The whole act.
61 & 62 Vict. c. 36	Criminal Evidence Act 1898	In section 6(1), the words from "except that" onwards.
61 & 62 Vict. c. 36	Criminal Evidence Act 1898	In the Schedule, the entry relating to the Poor Law (Scotland) Act 1845.
10 & 11 Geo. 5. c. 51	Duchy of Lancaster Act 1920	In section 3(3), the word "six".
14 & 15 Geo. 5. c. 16	Small Debt (Scotland) Act 1924	The whole act.
15 & 16 Geo. 5. c. 23	Administration of Estates Act 1925	In section 30(4), the word "six".
15 & 16 Geo. 5. c. 23	Administration of Estates Act 1925	In section 46(1)(i), the words "at the rate of", wherever they occur (whether as respects persons dying before 1953 or after 1952).
23 & 24 Geo. 5. c. 41	Administration of Justice (Scotland) Act 1933	Section 22.
23 & 24 Geo. 5. c. 41	Administration of Justice (Scotland) Act 1933	In section 27(1), the words from "and of any clerk or officer" to "twenty-five of this Act."
23 & 24 Geo. 5. c. 41	Administration of Justice (Scotland) Act 1933	Sections 31 and 36.
1 & 2 Geo. 6. c. 48	Criminal Procedure (Scotland) Act 1938	Sections 9 and 11.
10 & 11 Geo. 6. c. 44	Crown Proceedings Act 1947	In section 2(6), the words "the Road Fund,".
10 & 11 Eliz. 2. c. 15	Criminal Justice Administration Act 1962	The whole act.
1965 c. 2	Administration of Justice Act 1965	Section 7(3).
1968 c. 64	Civil Evidence Act 1968	In the Schedule, the entry relating to the Hop (Prevention of Frauds) Act 1866.

==== Part II: Banking ====
Citation	Short title	Description	Extent of repeal
14 Geo. 3. c. 32	Bank of Scotland Act 1774	An Act to enable the Governor and Company of the Bank of Scotland to increase the Capital Stock of the said Company.	The whole act.
24 Geo. 3. Sess. 2. c. 12	Bank of Scotland Act 1784	An Act to enable the Governor and Company of the Bank of Scotland further to increase the Capital Stock of the said Company.	The whole act.
32 Geo. 3. c. 25	Bank of Scotland Act 1792	An Act to enable the Governor and Company of the Bank of Scotland further to increase the Capital Stock of the said Company.	The whole act.
34 Geo. 3. c. 19	Bank of Scotland Act 1794	An Act to enable the Governor and Company of the Bank of Scotland further to increase the Capital Stock of the said Company.	The whole act.
44 Geo. 3. c. xxiii	Bank of Scotland Act 1804	An Act for further increasing the Capital Stock of the Governor and Company of the Bank of Scotland.	The whole act.
8 & 9 Vict. c. 76	Revenue Act 1845	Revenue Act 1845	The whole act.
19 & 20 Vict. c. 3	Joint Stock Banks (Scotland) Act 1856	Joint Stock Banks (Scotland) Act 1856.	The whole act.

==== Part III: Charities ====
Citation	Short title	Description	Extent of repeal
1 Geo. 2. St. 2. c. 22	Fund for Fire Victims in Edinburgh Act 1727	An Act to explain the Acts [3 Geo. 1. c. 5 and 9 Geo. 1. c. 14] for continuing the Duty of two Penny Scots on every Pint of Ale and Beer sold in the City of Edinburgh in relation to the Payment of Petty Post Customs; and for the more effectual securing the Payment of such money as hath been or shall be contributed towards a charitable fund for Relief of such as shall suffer by fire in the said city, and the suburbs and liberties thereof.	The whole act.
26 Geo. 3. c. 109	Clyde Marine Society Act 1786	An Act for incorporating the Members of a Society to be called The Clyde Marine Society; for the better empowering and enabling them to carry on their charitable and useful designs; and for levying certain duties from shipmasters and others, for that purpose.	The whole act.
32 Geo. 3. c. 29	Wear Coal Trade Act 1792	An Act for establishing a permanent fund for the relief and support of skippers and keelmen employed in the coal trade on the River Wear in the county of Durham who by sickness, or other accidental misfortunes, or by old age, shall not be able to maintain themselves and their families; and also for the relief of the widows and children of such skippers and keelmen.	The whole act.
50 Geo. 3. c. xxxiii	Clyde Marine Society Act 1810	An Act to amend [the Act 26 Geo. 3. c. 109].	The whole act.
21 & 22 Vict. c. 31	Bristol Charities (No. 2) Act 1858	An Act for confirming a Scheme of the Charity Commissioners for certain Charities in the parishes of St. Nicholas and St. Leonard in the City of Bristol.	The whole act.
23 & 24 Vict. c. 43	Tenison's Charity Act 1860	An Act for confirming a Scheme of the Charity Commissioners for the Administration of Archbishop Tenison's Charity in the Parish of Saint Martin in the Fields in the City of Westminster.	The whole act.
26 & 27 Vict. c. 58	Hitcham's Charity Act 1863	An Act for confirming a Scheme of the Charity Commissioners for the Management of the Charity of Sir Robert Hitcham, Knight, King's Serjeant, for the Benefit of Framlingham, Debenham, and Levington, in the County of Suffolk, and of Coggeshall in the County of Essex.	The whole act.
34 & 35 Vict. c. 117	Tancred's Charities Act 1871	An Act for confirming a Scheme of the Charity Commissioners for the several Charities founded by the Settlement and Will of Christopher Tancred, of Whixley in the county of York, Esquire, deceased.	The whole act.
48 & 49 Vict. c. 40	Polehampton Estates Act 1885	The Polehampton Estates Act 1885.	The whole act.
62 & 63 Vict. c. cclxxvii	Tancred's Charities Scheme Confirmation Act 1899	Tancred's Charities Scheme Confirmation Act 1899.	The whole act.

==== Part IV: Constitutional Provisions ====
Citation	Short title	Extent of repeal
2 & 3 Will. 4. c. 65	Representation of the People (Scotland) Act 1832	The whole act.
5 & 6 Will. 4. c. 35	Paymaster General Act 1835	Section 1.
5 & 6 Will. 4. c. 35	Paymaster General Act 1835	In section 3, the words from "to be created" to "abolished".
5 & 6 Will. 4. c. 35	Paymaster General Act 1835	In section 4, the words from "in the same manner" onwards.
5 & 6 Will. 4. c. 35	Paymaster General Act 1835	Section 7.
11 & 12 Vict. c. 55	Paymaster General Act 1848	Section 2.
1973 c. 36	Northern Ireland Constitution Act 1973	Section 10(4).
1978 c. 44	Employment Protection (Consolidation) Act 1978	In Schedule 16, paragraph 33.
1979 c. 17	Vaccine Damage Payments Act 1979	Sections 10 and 11.
1979 c. 18	Social Security Act 1979	Section 20(2).
1979 c. 22	Confirmation to Small Estates (Scotland) Act 1979	Section 3(3).
1979 c. 26	Legal Aid Act 1979	Section 12(2).
1979 c. 33	Land Registration (Scotland) Act 1979	Section 28(2).
1979 c. 36	Nurses, Midwives and Health Visitors Act 1979	In Schedule 7, paragraphs 32 and 33.
1979 c. 37	Banking Act 1979	Section 48(7).
1979 c. 38	Estate Agents Act 1979	Section 35.
1979 c. 46	Ancient Monuments and Archaeological Areas Act 1979	Section 62(1) to (3).
1979 c. 46	Ancient Monuments and Archaeological Areas Act 1979	Section 63.
Act of Parliament of Ireland
33 Geo. 3. c. 41 (I)	House of Commons Disqualification Act (Ireland) 1793	The whole act.

==== Part V: Finance ====
Citation	Short title	Extent of repeal
3 & 4 Vict. c. 110	Loan Societies Act 1840	The whole act as it applies to the Channel Islands and the Isle of Man.
3 & 4 Vict. c. 110	Loan Societies Act 1840	The following provisions as they apply to England and Wales:— In section 6, the words from "or which" to "Majesty". In section 7, the words from "and no certiorari" to "courts of record;". In section 16, the words from "and if any person" onwards. In section 17, the words from "or court of conscience" onwards except the words "having jurisdiction". Section 18. In section 21, the words from "without being liable" onwards. In section 23, the words from "and any clerk" to "usury;". Section 26. In section 28, the words "and the Islands of Guernsey, Jersey, and Isle of Man". In the Schedule, forms (B) and (C).
19 & 20 Vict. c. 43	Hereditary Revenues Act 1856	In the Schedule, the entry relating to the annuity granted to the Duke of Schoenberg and his heirs.
25 & 26 Vict. c. 7	India Stock Transfer Act 1862	Section 14.
26 & 27 Vict. c. 73	India Stock Certificate Act 1863	Sections 13 to 15.
50 & 51 Vict. c. 55	Sheriffs Act 1887	In section 26, the words "(which shall be exempt from stamp duty)".
50 & 51 Vict. c. 55	Sheriffs Act 1887	In section 30(1), the words "be exempt from stamp duty and".
54 & 55 Vict. c. 38	Stamp Duties Management Act 1891	Section 28.
1 & 2 Geo. 6. c. 25	Eire (Confirmation of Agreements) Act 1938	The whole act.
3 & 4 Geo. 6. c. 4	Czecho-Slovakia (Financial Claims and Refugees) Act 1940	The whole act.
12, 13 & 14 Geo. 6. c. 102	Festival of Britain (Supplementary Provisions) Act 1949	Section 2.
14 & 15 Geo. 6. c. 47	Festival of Britain (Additional Loans) Act 1951	The whole act.
9 & 10 Eliz. 2. c. 62	Trustee Investments Act 1961	In Part IV of Schedule 1, in paragraph 4, sub-paragraph (c) of the definition of "local authority".

==== Part VI: Housing ====
Citation	Short title	Extent of repeal
48 & 49 Vict. c. 72	Housing of the Working Classes Act 1885	The whole act as it applies to Scotland.
9 & 10 Geo. 5. c. 35	Housing, Town Planning, &c. Act 1919	Section 52(2).
9 & 10 Geo. 5. c. 60	Housing, Town Planning, &c. (Scotland) Act 1919	The whole act.
13 & 14 Geo. 5. c. 24	Housing, &c. Act 1923	The whole act as it applies to Scotland.
14 & 15 Geo. 5. c. 35	Housing (Financial Provisions) Act 1924	The whole act.
20 & 21 Geo. 5. c. 6	Housing (Revision of Contributions) Act 1929	The whole act.
20 & 21 Geo. 5. c. 39	Housing Act 1930	The whole act.
21 & 22 Geo. 5. c. 39	Housing (Rural Authorities) Act 1931	The whole act.
25 & 26 Geo. 5. c. 40	Housing Act 1935	Section 92(1).
25 & 26 Geo. 5. c. 40	Housing Act 1935	In section 100(1), the words from "and the Act of 1925" onwards.
25 & 26 Geo. 5. c. 40	Housing Act 1935	Section 100(2).
25 & 26 Geo. 5. c. 41	Housing (Scotland) Act 1935	The whole act.
2 & 3 Geo. 6. c. 73	Housing (Emergency Powers) Act 1939	The whole act.
4 & 5 Geo. 6. c. 34	Repair of War Damage Act 1941	The whole act.
9 & 10 Geo. 6. c. 20	Building Materials and Housing Act 1945	The whole act.
12, 13 & 14 Geo. 6. c. 60	Housing Act 1949	Sections 5 and 43.
12, 13 & 14 Geo. 6. c. 60	Housing Act 1949	In section 50(1), all the definitions except that of "house".
12, 13 & 14 Geo. 6. c. 60	Housing Act 1949	In section 51(1), the words from "and the Housing Acts" onwards.
12, 13 & 14 Geo. 6. c. 60	Housing Act 1949	In section 51(2), the words from "except" to "thereof".
12, 13 & 14 Geo. 6. c. 61	Housing (Scotland) Act 1949	The whole act.
14 Geo. 6. c. 34	Housing (Scotland) Act 1950	Sections 76, 83 and 173.
14 Geo. 6. c. 34	Housing (Scotland) Act 1950	In section 184(1), all the definitions except those of "development corporation", "Highlands and Islands", "house", "housing association" and "land"; and section 184(3).
14 Geo. 6. c. 34	Housing (Scotland) Act 1950	Sections 186(2) and 187.
14 Geo. 6. c. 34	Housing (Scotland) Act 1950	Schedules 9 and 13.
2 & 3 Eliz. 2. c. 53	Housing Repairs and Rents Act 1954	Sections 51, 52(1), 53 and 54(2) and (4).
2 & 3 Eliz. 2. c. 53	Housing Repairs and Rents Act 1954	Schedule 5.
4 & 5 Eliz. 2. c. 52	Clean Air Act 1956	In Part III of Schedule 3, the entries relating to the Housing (Scotland) Act 1950.
5 & 6 Eliz. 2. c. 38	Housing and Town Development (Scotland) Act 1957	In Schedule 1, paragraphs 13 and 14.
6 & 7 Eliz. 2. c. 42	Housing (Financial Provisions) Act 1958	In section 28, the references to the Housing, Town Planning, &c. Act 1919, the Housing, &c. Act 1923, the Housing (Financial Provisions) Act 1924 and the Housing (Rural Authorities) Act 1931.
6 & 7 Eliz. 2. c. 42	Housing (Financial Provisions) Act 1958	In section 54(1), the words from "other than" onwards.
6 & 7 Eliz. 2. c. 42	Housing (Financial Provisions) Act 1958	Section 59(4).
7 & 8 Eliz. 2. c. 33	House Purchase and Housing Act 1959	Sections 3 and 25.
7 & 8 Eliz. 2. c. 33	House Purchase and Housing Act 1959	In section 28(3), the word "other".
7 & 8 Eliz. 2. c. 33	House Purchase and Housing Act 1959	In section 29(1), the definitions of "controlled tenancy", "improvement grant", and "the valuation officer"; and section 29(2) and (3).
7 & 8 Eliz. 2. c. 33	House Purchase and Housing Act 1959	Section 30.
7 & 8 Eliz. 2. c. 33	House Purchase and Housing Act 1959	Section 31(2) and (3).
7 & 8 Eliz. 2. c. 33	House Purchase and Housing Act 1959	Section 32(3); and in section 32(4), the words from "Part II" to "twenty-seven, and".
7 & 8 Eliz. 2. c. 33	House Purchase and Housing Act 1959	Schedule 2.
9 & 10 Eliz. 2. c. 65	Housing Act 1961	Sections 27(1) to (3), 30, 31, 35 and 36(5).
9 & 10 Eliz. 2. c. 65	Housing Act 1961	Schedule 4.
10 & 11 Eliz. 2. c. 28	Housing (Scotland) Act 1962	Section 34.
10 & 11 Eliz. 2. c. 28	Housing (Scotland) Act 1962	In section 36(1), the definition of "Act of 1957".
10 & 11 Eliz. 2. c. 28	Housing (Scotland) Act 1962	In Schedule 4, paragraphs 6 and 26.
1964 c. 56	Housing Act 1964	Sections 63, 105 and 108(2).
1964 c. 56	Housing Act 1964	Schedule 5.
1966 c. 49	Housing (Scotland) Act 1966	Section 209.
1968 c. 31	Housing (Financial Provisions) (Scotland) Act 1968	Section 59.
1968 c. 31	Housing (Financial Provisions) (Scotland) Act 1968	In Schedules 5, 6 and 8, the entries (wherever occurring) relating to the Housing, Town Planning, &c. (Scotland) Act 1919, the Housing, &c. Act 1923 and the Housing (Financial Provisions) Act 1924.
1969 c. 33	Housing Act 1969	In Schedule 8, paragraphs 9 and 12.
1969 c. 34	Housing (Scotland) Act 1969	In section 66, the words from "section 209(1)" to "Lands Tribunal)".
1969 c. 34	Housing (Scotland) Act 1969	In Schedule 6, paragraphs 20, 30, 41 and 47.
1972 c. 46	Housing (Financial Provisions) (Scotland) Act 1972	Section 23(1)(c).
1972 c. 46	Housing (Financial Provisions) (Scotland) Act 1972	Section 80.
1972 c. 46	Housing (Financial Provisions) (Scotland) Act 1972	In Schedule 1, the entries (wherever occurring) relating to the Housing, Town Planning, &c. (Scotland) Act 1919, the Housing, &c. Act 1923 and the Housing (Financial Provisions) Act 1924.
1972 c. 46	Housing (Financial Provisions) (Scotland) Act 1972	In Schedule 4, paragraph 2(a)(ii).
1972 c. 46	Housing (Financial Provisions) (Scotland) Act 1972	In Schedule 9, paragraph 1.

==== Part VII: Local Government ====
Citation	Short title	Description	Extent of repeal
8 Geo. 3. c. 16	Glasgow (Improvement) Act 1768	An Act for making and widening a passage or street from the Salt Market Street, in the City of Glasgow, to Saint Andrew's Church, in the said City; and for enlarging and compleating the churchyard of the said church; and for making and building a convenient exchange or square in the said City; and also for explaining and amending [the Act 32 Geo. 2. c. 62] for improving the navigation of the River Clyde, to the City of Glasgow; and for building a bridge cross the said River, from the said City to the Village of Gorbells.	The whole act.
26 & 27 Vict. c. 60	General Police and Improvement (Scotland) Supplemental Act 1862	General Police and Improvement (Scotland) Supplemental Act 1862.	The whole act.
30 & 31 Vict. c. 134	Metropolitan Streets Act 1867	Metropolitan Streets Act 1867.	Section 25.
6 Edw. 7. c. 33	Local Authorities (Treasury Powers) Act 1906	Local Authorities (Treasury Powers) Act 1906.	The whole act.
2 & 3 Eliz. 2. c. 42	Slaughterhouses Act 1954	Slaughterhouses Act 1954.	The whole act.
2 & 3 Eliz. 2. c. 59	Slaughter of Animals (Amendment) Act 1954	Slaughter of Animals (Amendment) Act 1954.	The whole act.
1963 c. 32	Public Lavatories (Turnstiles) Act 1963	Public Lavatories (Turnstiles) Act 1963.	Section 1(4); and in section 1(5) the words "a local authority within the meaning of the London Government Act 1939".
1968 c. 73	Transport Act 1968	Transport Act 1968.	Section 154.
1973 c. 65	Local Government (Scotland) Act 1973	Local Government (Scotland) Act 1973.	Section 56(11), (12) and (13).
1973 c. 65	Local Government (Scotland) Act 1973	Local Government (Scotland) Act 1973.	Section 147(3); and in section 147(4) the words from "Without prejudice" to "above".
1973 c. 65	Local Government (Scotland) Act 1973	Local Government (Scotland) Act 1973.	Section 167.
1973 c. 65	Local Government (Scotland) Act 1973	Local Government (Scotland) Act 1973.	Section 213(1) and (2).

==== Part VIII: Oaths and Affirmations ====
Citation	Short title	Extent of repeal
55 Geo. 3. c. 194	Apothecaries Act 1815	In section 11, the words "(or, being one of the people called Quakers, do solemnly affirm)" and the words "or affirmation".
56 Geo. 3. c. 46	Civil List Audit Act 1816	In section 10, the words "or affirmation (if Quakers)" and "oath or affirmation".
56 Geo. 3. c. 56	Probate Duty (Ireland) Act 1816	In section 117, the words "or solemn affirmation in the case of Quakers", "or affirmant's" and "or affirmation".
56 Geo. 3. c. 56	Probate Duty (Ireland) Act 1816	In sections 130 and 131, the words "or affirmation", wherever occurring.
56 Geo. 3. c. 100	Habeas Corpus Act 1816	In section 1, the words from "or affirmation" to "allowed)".
56 Geo. 3. c. 100	Habeas Corpus Act 1816	In section 3, the words from "or by affirmation" to "allowed by law)", the words "and affirmations" and the words from "or affirmation" to "allowed)".
3 & 4 Will. 4. c. 41	Judicial Committee Act 1833	In section 9, the words "or if a Quaker or Moravian upon solemn affirmation", "oath and affirmation respectively" and "or affirm".
6 & 7 Will. 4. c. 77	Ecclesiastical Commissioners Act 1836	In section 9, the words from "or, in lieu" onwards.
3 & 4 Vict. c. 50	Canals (Offences) Act 1840	In section 1, the words "or make a solemn declaration", "or declaration" and "or made such declaration as aforesaid".
7 & 8 Vict. c. 81	Marriages (Ireland) Act 1844	In section 9, the words "or a solemn affirmation or declaration instead of taking an oath" and "oath, affirmation, or declaration".
7 & 8 Vict. c. 81	Marriages (Ireland) Act 1844	In section 22, the words from "or shall make" to "an oath".
8 & 9 Vict. c. 16	Companies Clauses Consolidation Act 1845	In section 3, the definition of "oath".
8 & 9 Vict. c. 17	Companies Clauses Consolidation (Scotland) Act 1845	In section 3, the definition of "oath".
8 & 9 Vict. c. 18	Lands Clauses Consolidation Act 1845	In section 3, the definition of "oath".
8 & 9 Vict. c. 19	Lands Clauses Consolidation (Scotland) Act 1845	In section 3, the definition of "oath".
8 & 9 Vict. c. 20	Railways Clauses Consolidation Act 1845	In section 3, the definition of "oath".
8 & 9 Vict. c. 33	Railways Clauses Consolidation (Scotland) Act 1845	In section 3, the definition of "oath".
8 & 9 Vict. c. 118	Inclosure Act 1845	In section 39, the words "or being Quakers upon their affirmations" and the words "and affirmations", wherever occurring.
8 & 9 Vict. c. 118	Inclosure Act 1845	In section 40, the words "or being a Quaker to make affirmation" and the words "or being a Quaker affirmed".
10 & 11 Vict. c. 14	Markets and Fairs Clauses Act 1847	In section 3, the definition of "oath".
10 & 11 Vict. c. 16	Commissioners Clauses Act 1847	In section 3, the definition of "oath".
10 & 11 Vict. c. 27	Harbours, Docks, and Piers Clauses Act 1847	In section 3, the definition of "oath".
10 & 11 Vict. c. 34	Towns Improvement Clauses Act 1847	In section 3, the definition of "oath".
10 & 11 Vict. c. 65	Cemeteries Clauses Act 1847	In section 3, the definition of "oath".
10 & 11 Vict. c. 69	House of Commons Costs Taxation Act 1847	In section 10, the definition of "oath".
10 & 11 Vict. c. 89	Town Police Clauses Act 1847	In section 3, the definition of "oath".
12 & 13 Vict. c. 78	House of Lords Costs Taxation Act 1849	In section 14, the definition of "oath".
31 & 32 Vict. c. 72	Promissory Oaths Act 1868	In section 7, the words "or make such affirmation".
31 & 32 Vict. c. 72	Promissory Oaths Act 1868	In section 9, the words from "or to make" to "any of them".
33 & 34 Vict. c. 110	Matrimonial Causes and Marriage Law (Ireland) Amendment Act 1870	In section 35, in the paragraph beginning "Before any licence", the words "or make affirmation" and "oath or affirmation".

==== Part IX: Pensions ====
Citation	Short title	Extent of repeal
2 & 3 Will. 4. c. 111	Lord Chancellor's Pension Act 1832	In section 3, the words "or the office of keeper of the great seal of Great Britain", wherever occurring and "or the keeper of the great seal of Great Britain"; the words from "after paying" to "to be paid out of the same"; the words "free and clear of all taxes and deductions whatsoever"; and the words from "anything contained in any Act" onwards.
29 & 30 Vict. c. 18	India Military Funds Act 1866	The whole act.
45 & 46 Vict. c. 45	Bombay Civil Fund Act 1882	The whole act.
59 & 60 Vict. c. 50	Poor Law Officers' Superannuation Act 1896	The whole act.
5 & 6 Geo. 5. c. 83	Naval and Military War Pensions, &c. Act 1915	In section 3(1), paragraphs (a) to (h) and (k).
7 & 8 Geo. 5. c. 37	Naval and Military War Pensions, &c. (Transfer of Powers) Act 1917	The whole act.
8 & 9 Geo. 5. c. 57	War Pensions (Administrative Provisions) Act 1918	Section 8.
8 & 9 Geo. 5. c. 57	War Pensions (Administrative Provisions) Act 1918	Section 9, except subsections (1) and (5).
8 & 9 Geo. 5. c. 57	War Pensions (Administrative Provisions) Act 1918	In section 18(1), the words "the Naval and Military War Pensions, &c. (Transfer of Powers) Act 1917, the Naval and Military War Pensions, &c. (Committees) Act 1917"; in section 18(2), the definition of "Ministry"; and section 18(3).
10 & 11 Geo. 5. c. 23	War Pensions Act 1920	Section 9.
16 & 17 Geo. 5. c. 51	Electricity (Supply) Act 1926	Section 33.
Act of Parliament of Northern Ireland
1968 c. 34 (N.I.)	Children and Young Persons Act (Northern Ireland) 1968	Sections 92(5) and 109.

==== Part X: Road Traffic and Highways ====
Citation	Short title	Description	Extent of repeal
46 Geo. 3. c. cxxxiv	Bloomsbury Square Act 1806	An Act for ornamenting and embellishing the centre or area of Bloomsbury Square, in the parish of Saint George Bloomsbury, in the county of Middlesex; and for preventing hackney coaches standing or plying for hire in and near the said square.	Sections 35 and 36.
2 & 3 Will. 4. c. 120	Stage Carriages Act 1832	Stage Carriages Act 1832.	The whole act, except as it applies to the Blackpool tramway system.
13 & 14 Vict. c. 7	London Hackney Carriages Act 1850	London Hackney Carriages Act 1850.	Section 6.
Turnpike Law
3 Geo. 4. c. 126	Turnpike Roads Act 1822	Turnpike Roads Act 1822.	The whole act.
4 Geo. 4. c. 16	Turnpike Roads (Tolls on Lime) Act 1823	An Act to explain so much of the General Turnpike Act, as relates to the toll payable on carriages laden with lime for the improvement of land.	The whole act.
4 Geo. 4. c. 95	Turnpike Roads Act 1823	An Act to explain and amend [the Turnpike Roads Act 1822].	The whole act.
5 Geo. 4. c. 69	Turnpike Roads Act 1824	An Act to enable justices of the peace for ridings, divisions, or sokes, to act as trustees for repairing and maintaining turnpike roads.	The whole act.
7 & 8 Geo. 4. c. 24	Turnpike Roads (England) Act 1827	An Act to amend the Acts for regulating turnpike roads in England.	The whole act.
9 Geo. 4. c. 77	Turnpike Roads (England) Act 1828	An Act to amend the Acts for regulating turnpike roads.	The whole act.
1 & 2 Will. 4. c. 25	Turnpikes Act 1831	An Act to amend the Acts for regulating turnpike roads in England, so far as they relate to certain exemptions from toll.	The whole act.
2 & 3 Will. 4. c. 124	Turnpikes Act 1832	An Act to explain certain provisions in local Acts of Parliament relating to double toll on turnpike roads.	The whole act.
3 & 4 Will. 4. c. 80	Turnpike Trusts Returns Act 1833	An Act requiring the annual statements of trustees or commissioners of turnpike roads to be transmitted to the Secretary of State, and afterwards laid before Parliament.	The whole act.
4 & 5 Will. 4. c. 81	Turnpike Tolls (Allowance of Wagon Weights) Act 1834	An Act to amend [the Turnpike Roads Act 1822] so far as the same relates to the weights to be carried upon waggons with springs.	The whole act.
5 & 6 Will. 4. c. 18	Turnpike Tolls Act 1835	An Act to exempt carriages carrying manure from toll.	The whole act.
2 & 3 Vict. c. 46	Turnpike Tolls Act 1839	An Act to authorise the trustees of turnpike roads to reduce the scale of tolls payable for overweight.	The whole act.
3 & 4 Vict. c. 39	Turnpikes Act 1840	An Act to authorise trustees or commissioners of turnpike roads to appoint meetings for executing their trusts in certain cases.	The whole act.
3 & 4 Vict. c. 51	Turnpike Tolls Act 1840	An Act to amend and explain the general Turnpike Acts, so far as relates to the toll payable on carriages or horses laden with lime for the improvement of land.	The whole act.
4 & 5 Vict. c. 33	Turnpike Tolls Act 1841	An Act to amend the Acts for regulating turnpike roads in England, so far as they relate to certain exemptions from toll.	The whole act.
4 & 5 Vict. c. 59	Application of Highway Rates to Turnpikes Act 1841	An Act to authorise the application of a portion of the highway rates to turnpike roads, in certain cases.	The whole act.
12 & 13 Vict. c. 87	Turnpike Acts Continuance Act 1849	An Act to continue certain Turnpike Acts in Great Britain for limited periods, and to make certain provisions respecting turnpike roads in England.	The whole act.
16 & 17 Vict. c. 135	Annual Turnpike Acts Continuance Act 1853	Annual Turnpike Acts Continuance Act 1853.	The whole act.
17 & 18 Vict. c. 51	Provisional Order Confirmation (Turnpikes) Act 1854	An Act to confirm certain provisional orders made under [the Act 14 & 15 Vict. c. 38], to facilitate arrangements for the relief of turnpike trusts, and to make certain provisions respecting exemptions from tolls.	The whole act.
17 & 18 Vict. c. 58	Annual Turnpike Acts Continuance Act 1854	Annual Turnpike Acts Continuance Act 1854.	The whole act.
18 & 19 Vict. c. 102	Provisional Order Confirmation (Turnpikes) Act 1855	An Act to confirm certain provisional orders made under [the Act 14 & 15 Vict. c. 38], to facilitate arrangements for the relief of turnpike trusts.	The whole act.
19 & 20 Vict. c. 12	Turnpike Trusts Act 1856	An Act to confirm certain provisional orders made under [the Act 14 & 15 Vict. c. 38], to facilitate arrangements for the relief of turnpike trusts.	The whole act.
20 & 21 Vict. c. 9	Provisional Order Confirmation (Turnpikes) Act 1857	An Act to confirm certain provisional orders made under [the Act 14 & 15 Vict. c. 38], to facilitate arrangements for the relief of turnpike trusts.	The whole act.
21 & 22 Vict. c. 80	Provisional Order Confirmation Turnpikes Act 1858	An Act to confirm certain provisional orders made under [the Act 14 & 15 Vict. c. 38], to facilitate arrangements for the relief of turnpike trusts.	The whole act.
22 & 23 Vict. c. 33	Provisional Order Confirmation Turnpikes Act 1859	An Act to confirm certain provisional orders made under [the Act 14 & 15 Vict. c. 38], to facilitate arrangements for the relief of turnpike trusts.	The whole act.
23 & 24 Vict. c. 70	Provisional Order Confirmation Turnpikes Act 1860	An Act to confirm certain provisional orders made under [the Act 14 & 15 Vict. c. 38], to facilitate arrangements for the relief of turnpike trusts.	The whole act.
24 & 25 Vict. c. 46	Turnpike Trusts Relief Act 1861	An Act to confirm certain provisional orders made under [the Act 14 & 15 Vict. c. 38], to facilitate arrangements for the relief of turnpike trusts, and to extend the provisions of the said Act.	The whole act.
25 & 26 Vict. c. 56	Provisional Orders Confirmation (Turnpikes) Act 1862	An Act to confirm certain provisional orders made under [the Act 14 & 15 Vict. c. 38], to facilitate arrangements for the relief of turnpike trusts.	The whole act.
26 & 27 Vict. c. 98	Provisional Order Confirmation (Turnpikes) Act 1863	An Act to confirm certain provisional orders made under [the Act 14 & 15 Vict. c. 38], to facilitate arrangements for the relief of turnpike trusts.	The whole act.
27 & 28 Vict. c. 75	Annual Turnpike Acts Continuance Act 1864	Annual Turnpike Acts Continuance Act 1864.	The whole act.
27 & 28 Vict. c. 79	Provisional Order Confirmation (Turnpikes) Act 1864	An Act to confirm certain provisional orders made under [the Act 14 & 15 Vict. c. 38], to facilitate arrangements for the relief of turnpike trusts.	The whole act.
28 & 29 Vict. c. 91	Turnpikes, Provisional Orders Confirmation Act 1865	An Act to confirm certain provisional orders made under [the Act 14 & 15 Vict. c. 38], to facilitate arrangements for the relief of turnpike trusts.	The whole act.
29 & 30 Vict. c. 92	Turnpikes, Provisional Orders Confirmation Act 1866	An Act to confirm certain provisional orders made under [the Act 14 & 15 Vict. c. 38], to facilitate arrangements for the relief of turnpike trusts.	The whole act.
29 & 30 Vict. c. 105	Annual Turnpike Acts Continuance Act 1866	Annual Turnpike Acts Continuance Act 1866.	The whole act.
30 & 31 Vict. c. 66	Turnpike Trusts Arrangements Act 1867	Turnpike Trusts Arrangements Act 1867.	The whole act.
30 & 31 Vict. c. 121	Annual Turnpike Acts Continuance Act 1867	Annual Turnpike Acts Continuance Act 1867.	The whole act.
31 & 32 Vict. c. 66	Turnpike Trusts Arrangements Act 1868	Turnpike Trusts Arrangements Act 1868.	The whole act.
31 & 32 Vict. c. 99	Annual Turnpike Acts Continuance Act 1868	Annual Turnpike Acts Continuance Act 1868.	The whole act.
32 & 33 Vict. c. 90	Annual Turnpike Acts Continuance Act 1869	Annual Turnpike Acts Continuance Act 1869.	The whole act.
33 & 34 Vict. c. 22	Turnpikes Provisional Orders Confirmation Act 1870	An Act to confirm a certain provisional order made under [the Act 14 & 15 Vict. c. 38], to facilitate arrangements for the relief of turnpike trusts.	The whole act.
34 & 35 Vict. c. 115	Annual Turnpike Acts Continuance Act 1871	Annual Turnpike Acts Continuance Act 1871.	The whole act.
35 & 36 Vict. c. 85	Annual Turnpike Acts Continuance Act 1872	Annual Turnpike Acts Continuance Act 1872.	Sections 14 and 15.
38 & 39 Vict. c. cxciv	Annual Turnpike Acts Continuance Act 1875	Annual Turnpike Acts Continuance Act 1875.	The whole act.
45 & 46 Vict. c. 52	Annual Turnpike Acts Continuance Act 1882	Annual Turnpike Acts Continuance Act 1882.	The whole act.
47 & 48 Vict. c. 52	Annual Turnpike Acts Continuance Act 1884	Annual Turnpike Acts Continuance Act 1884.	The whole act.
53 & 54 Vict. c. 51	Statute Law Revision (No. 2) Act 1890	Statute Law Revision (No. 2) Act 1890.	Section 3.

==== Part XI: War and Emergency ====
Citation	Short title	Extent of repeal
War Damage
4 & 5 Geo. 6. c. 28	Trustee (War Damage Insurance) Act 1941	The whole act.
6 & 7 Geo. 6. c. 21	War Damage Act 1943	The whole act.
9 & 10 Geo. 6. c. 40	Miscellaneous Financial Provisions Act 1946	Section 2.
12, 13 & 14 Geo. 6. c. 36	War Damage (Public Utility Undertakings, &c.) Act 1949	The whole act.
6 & 7 Eliz. 2. c. 51	Public Records Act 1958	In Schedule 2, the entry relating to the War Damage Act 1943.
8 & 9 Eliz. 2. c. 25	War Damage (Clearance Payments) Act 1960	The whole act.
1964 c. 25	War Damage Act 1964	The whole act.
1964 c. 26	Licensing Act 1964	Section 118(3).
1964 c. 51	Universities and College Estates Act 1964	In Schedule 3, the entry relating to the War Damage Act 1943.
1965 c. 2	Administration of Justice Act 1965	In Schedule 1, the entry relating to the War Damage Act 1943.
1978 c. 23	Judicature (Northern Ireland) Act 1978	In Part II of Schedule 5, the entry relating to the War Damage Act 1943.
War Risks Insurance
2 & 3 Geo. 6. c. 57	War Risks Insurance Act 1939	The whole act.
2 & 3 Geo. 6. c. 120	Restriction of Advertisements (War Risks Insurance) Act 1939	Section 1(2)(a).
4 & 5 Geo. 6. c. 12	War Damage Act 1941	The whole act.
5 & 6 Geo. 6. c. 28	War Damage (Amendment) Act 1942	The whole act.
15 & 16 Geo. 6 & 1 Eliz. 2. c. 56	Insurance Contracts (War Settlement) Act 1952	The whole act.
15 & 16 Geo. 6 & 1 Eliz. 2. c. 57	Marine and Aviation Insurance (War Risks) Act 1952	In section 5(1), in paragraph (a), sub-paragraphs (ii) and (iii); and in paragraph (b), sub-paragraph (ii) and the word "and" preceding that sub-paragraph.
15 & 16 Geo. 6 & 1 Eliz. 2. c. 57	Marine and Aviation Insurance (War Risks) Act 1952	Section 10(4).
1979 c. 54	Sale of Goods Act 1979	In Schedule 2, the entry relating to the War Risks Insurance Act 1939.
Reinstatement in Civil Employment
7 & 8 Geo. 6. c. 15	Reinstatement in Civil Employment Act 1944	The whole act.
11 & 12 Geo. 6. c. 64	National Service Act 1948	Section 39 so far as it relates to the Reinstatement in Civil Employment Act 1944.
11 & 12 Geo. 6. c. 64	National Service Act 1948	Sections 40, 41(5), 43(4), 51 and 52.
11 & 12 Geo. 6. c. 64	National Service Act 1948	In section 54(1), the definition of "the Act of 1944"; and section 54(2) and (7).
11 & 12 Geo. 6. c. 64	National Service Act 1948	Sections 59 and 60.
12, 13 & 14 Geo. 6. c. 6	National Service (Amendment) Act 1948	The whole act.
14 & 15 Geo. 6. c. 10	Reinstatement in Civil Employment Act 1950	In section 1, the words "(except section forty)".
14 & 15 Geo. 6. c. 10	Reinstatement in Civil Employment Act 1950	In section 5(4), the words from "which" to "also" except the word "shall".
Other Enactments
7 & 8 Eliz. 2. c. 19	Emergency Laws (Repeal) Act 1959	Section 9.
1964 c. 60	Emergency Laws (Re-enactments and Repeals) Act 1964	Section 21.

==== Part XII: Miscellaneous ====
Citation	Short title	Description	Extent of repeal
29 Geo. 3. c. 25	Northumberland Fishery Act 1789	An Act to incorporate certain Persons therein named, and their Successors, by the Name and Stile of The Northumberland Fishery Society; and to enable them, when incorporated, to subscribe a Capital Joint Stock for more effectually supporting, conducting, and increasing such Fishery.	The whole act.
54 Geo. 3. c. 159	Harbours Act 1814	Harbours Act 1814.	The whole act.
18 & 19 Vict. c. 131	School Grants Act 1855	School Grants Act 1855.	In section 1, the words "under his hand be given to the same".
23 & 24 Vict. c. 112	Defence Act 1860	Defence Act 1860.	In section 11, as it applies to Scotland, the words "femes covert, infants, persons suffering from mental disorder within the meaning of the Mental Health (Scotland) Act 1960 or".
25 & 26 Vict. c. 69	Harbours Transfer Act 1862	Harbours Transfer Act 1862.	Section 16.
31 & 32 Vict. c. 45	Sea Fisheries Act 1868	Sea Fisheries Act 1868.	Section 69.
6 Edw. 7. c. 50	National Galleries of Scotland Act 1906	National Galleries of Scotland Act 1906.	In section 4(1), the words from "The said seven members" to "as aforesaid"; and in section 4(3) the words from "but the person" onwards.
6 Edw. 7. c. 50	National Galleries of Scotland Act 1906	National Galleries of Scotland Act 1906.	In section 8, the words "or the growing produce thereof".
18 & 19 Geo. 5. c. 34	Reorganisation of Offices (Scotland) Act 1928	Reorganisation of Offices (Scotland) Act 1928.	Sections 2, 4, 7 to 9, 11 and 12.
18 & 19 Geo. 5. c. 34	Reorganisation of Offices (Scotland) Act 1928	Reorganisation of Offices (Scotland) Act 1928.	In section 13, the definition of "the Register of Deeds."
24 & 25 Geo. 5. c. 30	Cotton Manufacturing Industry (Temporary Provisions) Act 1934	Cotton Manufacturing Industry (Temporary Provisions) Act 1934.	The whole act.
1 Edw. 8 & 1 Geo. 6. c. 43	Public Records (Scotland) Act 1937	Public Records (Scotland) Act 1937.	Section 4.
1 Edw. 8 & 1 Geo. 6. c. 43	Public Records (Scotland) Act 1937	Public Records (Scotland) Act 1937.	In section 5(2), the words "section seventy-eight of the Town Councils (Scotland) Act 1900, or in" and "other".
1 Edw. 8 & 1 Geo. 6. c. 43	Public Records (Scotland) Act 1937	Public Records (Scotland) Act 1937.	Section 13(2).
1 Edw. 8 & 1 Geo. 6. c. 43	Public Records (Scotland) Act 1937	Public Records (Scotland) Act 1937.	Schedule 1.
9 & 10 Geo. 6. c. 15	Public Health (Scotland) Act 1945	Public Health (Scotland) Act 1945.	Section 2.
9 & 10 Geo. 6. c. 82	Cable and Wireless Act 1946	Cable and Wireless Act 1946.	Section 3(1) to (3).
11 & 12 Geo. 6. c. 27	Palestine Act 1948	Palestine Act 1948.	The whole act.
14 & 15 Geo. 6. c. 30	Sea Fish Industry Act 1951	Sea Fish Industry Act 1951.	Section 26.
2 & 3 Eliz. 2. c. 14	National Museum of Antiquities of Scotland Act 1954	National Museum of Antiquities of Scotland Act 1954.	Section 6.
4 & 5 Eliz. 2. c. 52	Clean Air Act 1956	Clean Air Act 1956.	Section 33(2).
4 & 5 Eliz. 2. c. 52	Clean Air Act 1956	Clean Air Act 1956.	In Schedule 2, the entries relating to sections 16A and 17(2) of the Alkali, &c. Works Regulation Act 1906.
5 & 6 Eliz. 2. c. 16	Nurses Agencies Act 1957	Nurses Agencies Act 1957.	In section 6(2), the words from the beginning to "1907, and".
6 & 7 Eliz. 2. c. 69	Opencast Coal Act 1958	Opencast Coal Act 1958.	In section 52(4), the proviso.
8 & 9 Eliz. 2. c. 61	Mental Health (Scotland) Act 1960	Mental Health (Scotland) Act 1960.	In Schedule 4, the entry relating to the Defence Act 1860.
1965 c. 49	Registration of Births, Deaths and Marriages (Scotland) Act 1965	Registration of Births, Deaths and Marriages (Scotland) Act 1965.	In section 54(2), the words from "made" to "subsection or".
1968 c. 46	Health Services and Public Health Act 1968	Health Services and Public Health Act 1968.	Sections 74 and 75.
1973 c. 13	Supply of Goods (Implied Terms) Act 1973	Supply of Goods (Implied Terms) Act 1973.	In section 14(1), both as substituted prospectively by Schedule 4 to the Consumer Credit Act 1974 and (as so substituted) subsequently amended, and as having effect apart from any such substitution, the words "or, in Scotland, the agreement is a consumer contract within Part II of that Act".
1973 c. 42	National Insurance and Supplementary Benefit Act 1973	National Insurance and Supplementary Benefit Act 1973.	The whole act.
1974 c. 32	Town and Country Amenities Act 1974	Town and Country Amenities Act 1974.	Sections 1(2), 2(2), 10(7) and 11(7).
1975 c. 78	Airports Authority Act 1975	Airports Authority Act 1975.	Section 25(11).
1976 c. 51	Maplin Development Authority (Dissolution) Act 1976	Maplin Development Authority (Dissolution) Act 1976.	The whole act.
1976 c. 55	Agriculture (Miscellaneous Provisions) Act 1976	Agriculture (Miscellaneous Provisions) Act 1976.	In Schedule 3, the entry relating to the Hop (Prevention of Frauds) Act 1866.
1977 c. 50	Unfair Contract Terms Act 1977	Unfair Contract Terms Act 1977.	In Schedule 3, in paragraph (a) of the entry relating to the Supply of Goods (Implied Terms) Act 1973, the words "or, in Scotland, the agreement is a consumer contract within Part II of that Act".
Act of Parliament of Northern Ireland
1970 c. 1 (N.I.)	Harbours Act (Northern Ireland) 1970	Harbours Act (Northern Ireland) 1970.	In Schedule 5, the entry relating to the Harbours Act 1814.

== Subsequent developments ==
Paragraph 4 of schedule 2 was repealed by section 1(1) of, and group 4 of part 1 of schedule 1 to, the Statute Law (Repeals) Act 2008, which came into force on 21 July 2008.

== See also ==
- Statute Law (Repeals) Act

== Bibliography ==
- Halsbury's Statutes. Fourth Edition. 2008 Reissue. Volume 41. Page 837.
- Peter Allsop (Editor in chief). Current Law Statutes Annotated 1981. Sweet & Maxwell, Stevens & sons. London. W Green & son. Edinburgh. 1982. Volume 1.
- The Public General Acts and General Synod Measures 1981. HMSO. London. 1982. Part I. Page 191.
- HL Deb vol 416, col 1042, vol 417, cols 134 to 137, vol 418, col 375, vol 419, col 304, HC Deb vol 4, cols 239 to 245.
