= Hereditary Revenues Act 1856 =

Act of the Parliament of the United Kingdom

Hereditary Revenues Act 1856 (Note: The citation of this act by this short title was authorised by section 5 of, and the second schedule to, the Statute Law Revision Act 1948. Due to the repeal of those provisions, it is now authorised by section 19(2) of the Interpretation Act 1978.)
- Act of Parliament
- Parliament of the United Kingdom
- Long title: An Act to authorise issues out of the Consolidated Fund for the redemption of certain Annuities charged on branches of the gross revenue. (Note: These words are printed against this act in the second column of the second schedule to the Statute Law Revision Act 1948, which is headed "Title".)
- Citation: 19 & 20 Vict. c. 43
- Territorial extent: United Kingdom

Dates
- Royal assent: 7 July 1856
- Commencement: 7 July 1856 (Note: The Acts of Parliament (Commencement) Act 1793.)
- Repealed: 16 November 1989
Other legislation
Amended by	Statute Law (Repeals) Act 1981
Repealed by	Statute Law (Repeals) Act 1989

Status: Repealed

Text of statute as originally enacted

The Hereditary Revenues Act 1856 (19 & 20 Vict. c. 43) was an act of the Parliament of the United Kingdom.

== Subsequent developments ==
In the schedule to the act, the entry relating to the annuity granted to the Duke of Schoenberg and his heirs was repealed by section 1(1) of, and part V of schedule 1 to, the Statute Law (Repeals) Act 1981, which came into force on 21 May 1981.

The whole act was repealed by section 1(1) of, and group 2 of part II of schedule 1 to, the Statute Law (Repeals) Act 1989, which came into force on 16 November 1989.
