= War Damage Commission =

War Damage Act 1941 (Note: Section 102(1).)
- Act of Parliament
- Parliament of the United Kingdom
- Long title: An Act to make provision with respect to war damage to immovable properly and to goods.
- Citation: 4 & 5 Geo. 6. c. 12
- Territorial extent: United Kingdom

Dates
- Royal assent: 26 March 1941
- Commencement: 26 March 1941 (Note: The Acts of Parliament (Commencement) Act 1793.)
- Repealed: 21 May 1981

Other legislation
- Amends: War Risks Insurance Act 1939; Housing (Emergency Powers) Act 1939; Housing (Emergency Powers) Act (Northern Ireland) 1939; Essential Buildings and Plant (Repair of War Damage) Act 1939; Essential Buildings and Plant (Repair of War Damage) Act (Northern Ireland) 1939
- Amended by: Statute Law Revision Act 1953; Statute Law (Repeals) Act 1973
- Repealed by: Statute Law (Repeals) Act 1981

Status: Repealed

Text of statute as originally enacted

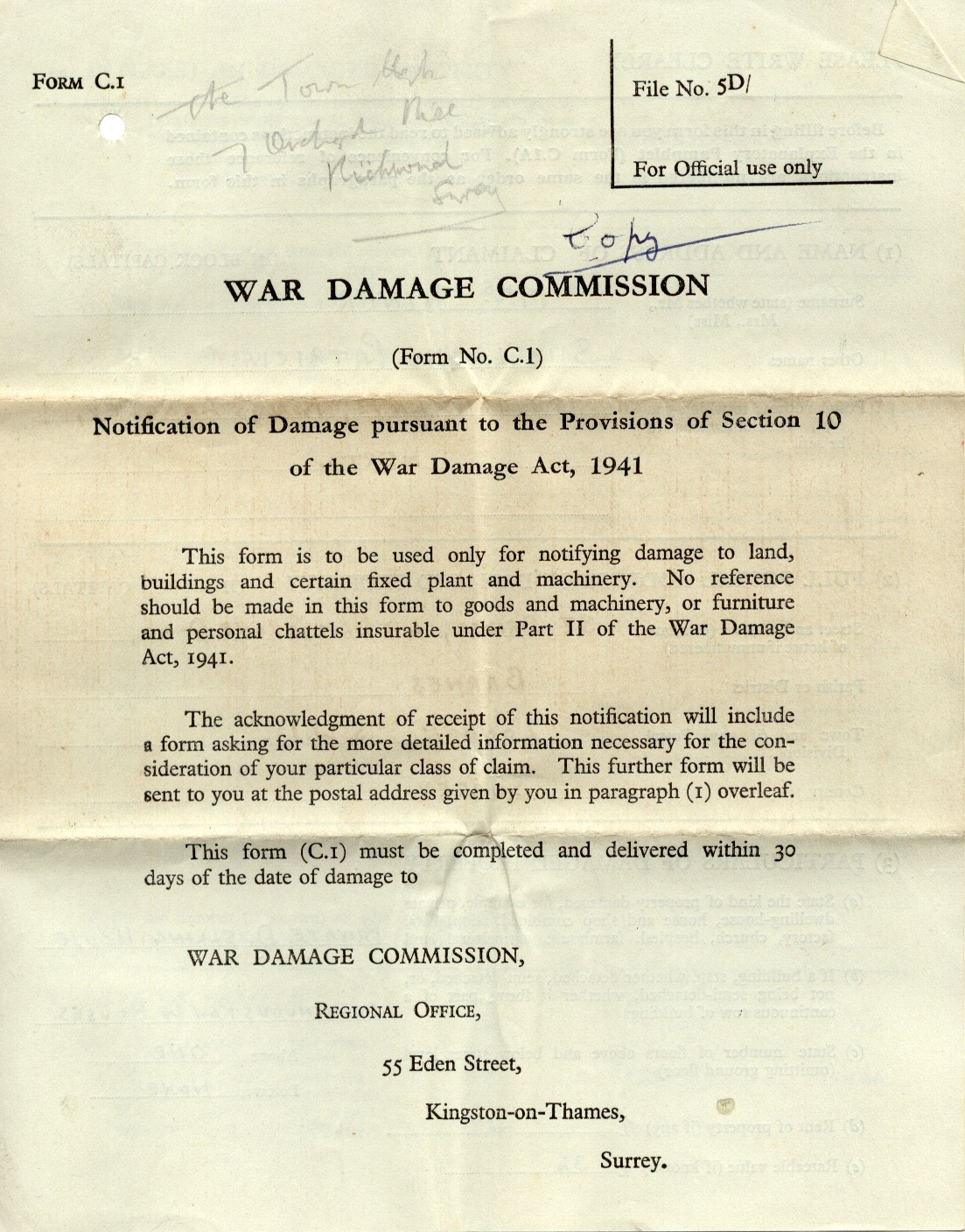
War Damage Commission notification form

The War Damage Commission was a body set up by the British Government under the War Damage Act 1941 (4 & 5 Geo. 6. c. 12) to pay compensation for war damage to land and buildings and " 'fixed' plant and machinery", throughout the United Kingdom. It was not responsible for the repairs themselves, which were carried out by local authorities or private contractors.

The commission was chaired by Malcolm Trustram Eve, then by Sir Thomas Williams Phillips (1949–1959). It was headquartered at Devonshire House, Mayfair Place, Piccadilly, London, and operated out of sixteen Regional Offices:

- Region No.1 – Northern (Newcastle upon Tyne): Durham, Northumberland, North Riding of Yorkshire
- Region No.2 – North-Eastern (Leeds): East Riding of Yorkshire, West Riding of Yorkshire
- Region No.3 – North Midland (Nottingham): Derbyshire, Leicestershire, Lincolnshire, Northamptonshire, Nottinghamshire, Rutland
- Region No.4 – Eastern (Cambridge): Bedfordshire, Cambridgeshire, Essex (except areas covered by Regions 5A and 5B), Hertfordshire, Huntingdonshire, Norfolk, Suffolk
- Region No.5A – North-West London (Acton)
- Region No.5B – North-East London (Finsbury Square)
- Region No.5C – South-East London (Euston Road)
- Region No.5D – South-West London (Kingston upon Thames)
- Region No.6 – Southern (Reading): Berkshire, Buckinghamshire, Dorset, Hampshire, Isle of Wight, Oxfordshire
- Region No.7 – South-Western (Bristol): Cornwall, Devon, Gloucestershire, Isles of Scilly, Somerset, Wiltshire
- Region No.8 – Wales (Cardiff)
- Region No.9 – Midland (Birmingham): Herefordshire, Shropshire, Staffordshire, Warwickshire, Worcestershire
- Region No.10 – North-Western (Manchester): Cheshire, Cumberland, Lancashire, Westmorland
- Region No.11 – Scotland (Edinburgh)
- Region No.12 – South-Eastern (Tunbridge Wells): Kent, Surrey, Sussex, except areas covered by Regions 5C and 5D
- Region No.13 – Northern Ireland (Belfast)

== Subsequent developments ==
Section 88 of the 1941 act was repealed by section 1(1) of, and part XIII of schedule 1 to, the Statute Law (Repeals) Act 1973, which came into force on 18 July 1973.

The whole act was repealed by section 1(1) of, and part XI of schedule 1 to, the Statute Law (Repeals) Act 1981, which came into force on 21 May 1981.
