= Referee in Bankruptcy =

U.S. federal court administrator

A Referee in Bankruptcy or Bankruptcy Referee was a federal official with quasi-judicial powers, appointed by a United States district court to administer bankruptcy proceedings, prior to 1979. The office was first created by the Bankruptcy Act of 1898, and was abolished by the Bankruptcy Reform Act of 1978, which created separate United States bankruptcy courts with permanently assigned judges.

== History ==
The Bankruptcy Act of 1898 established the position of bankruptcy referee "to assist in expeditiously transacting the bankruptcy business". The act specified that referees were to be appointed by the district court for a term of two years, although they could be removed from office or have their jurisdiction over a particular case revoked at any time. The courts could appoint the referees in such numbers "as may be necessary". The fees paid by petitioners in bankruptcy proceedings were used to compensate the referees.

All three earlier, short-lived acts providing for bankruptcy jurisdiction in the federal courts had made provision for the appointment of officers to assist in the administration of bankruptcy cases. The act of 1800 authorized district judges to appoint commissioners with various powers to declare a person a bankrupt, to take possession of a bankrupt's estate, and to assign the bankrupt's property. The next bankruptcy act, in 1841 provided for the appointment of commissioners to receive proof of debts and carry out other administrative duties related to bankruptcy cases. The Act that governed federal bankruptcy from 1867 to 1878 instructed district judges to appoint registers in bankruptcy, who would be nominated by the Chief Justice and assist the judges in a wide range of tasks related to bankruptcy proceedings.

Bankruptcy referees appointed under the Act of 1898 performed a wide range of judicial and administrative functions during the early part of the twentieth century, including the following: the consideration and adjudication of bankruptcy petitions submitted to the district courts; the examination of property schedules and lists of creditors filed by bankrupts; the administering of oaths and depositions to witnesses in bankruptcy proceedings; the maintenance of the records in such proceedings and the transmission of such records to the clerk of court; and the distribution of the property of bankrupts in cases where the district court judge was absent. Referees' decisions on substantive matters were subject to review by the district court.

Such duties made each referee a combination of special master and estate administrator until the late 1930s, when Congress transferred many of their administrative functions to bankruptcy trustees or clerks of court and increased the referees' judicial functions. The Chandler Act of 1938 granted referees the authority to adjudicate petitions referred to them, to administer oaths and examine witnesses, and to act for the judge in certain instances. As such, bankruptcy referees wore black-and-white striped robes as opposed to the black robes worn by judges.

In 1946, Congress provided a fixed salary for referees, increased their tenure from two to six years, and limited the circumstances under which they could be removed from office to incompetence, misconduct, or neglect of duty. In 1973 the Supreme Court acknowledged the increasingly judicial nature of the referees' work when it prescribed a set of bankruptcy rules that employed the term "bankruptcy judge" interchangeably with "referee".

In the Bankruptcy Reform Act of 1978 Congress enacted the current U.S. Bankruptcy Code, abolished the office of bankruptcy referee and established bankruptcy judgeships to serve separate bankruptcy courts in each judicial district. While these judges assumed the referees' judicial duties, the remaining administrative functions in most districts were transferred to trustees whose offices were placed under the supervision of the Department of Justice.

== Attribution ==
- Material on this page was copied from the website of the Federal Judicial Center, an agency of the United States whose works are in the public domain. The original is available here.
