= 3rd Parliament of Elizabeth I =

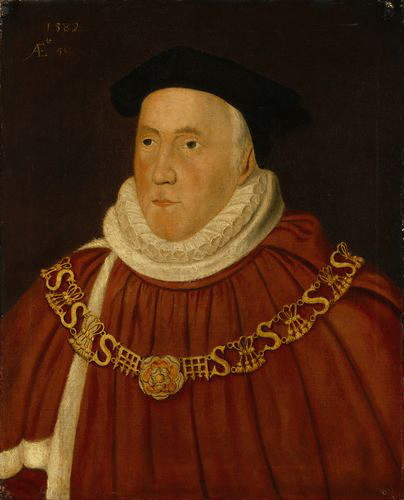
The Speaker, Sir Christopher Wray

The 3rd Parliament of Queen Elizabeth I was summoned by Queen Elizabeth I on 17 February 1571 and assembled on 2 April 1571. The number of Members of Parliament (MPs) had grown from 402 to 438 since the last Parliament of 1559.

To head off the usual problems caused by religious debate and calls for her to marry, Elizabeth instructed Parliament to deal with other issues and appointed lawyer Christopher Wray as Speaker of the House of Commons.

However, a number of bills concerning religious practices were introduced, only two of which were passed before Elizabeth claimed that religious practices in England were entirely her responsibility as head of the Church of England. Parliamentary complaints about the misuse of royal licences also met with Royal censure.

Nevertheless, several important statutes were passed legalizing moneylending, and for the maintenance of farmland and the navy. A further bill made it treasonable to support the recent bull of excommunication received by Elizabeth from Pope Pius V. Altogether a total of 29 statutes and 12 private measures were enacted by the time the 3rd Parliament was dissolved on 29 May 1571.

== Notable acts of the Parliament ==
- Treasons Act 1571
- Bulls, etc., from Rome Act 1571
- Fraudulent Conveyances Act 1571
- Letters Patent Act 1571
- Ecclesiastical Leases Act 1571
- Ordination of Ministers Act 1571
- Attainders of Earl of Westmorland and others Act 1571
- Oxford and Cambridge Act 1571

== Notable members ==
- Henry Neville - served for Berkshire in this Parliament

== See also ==
- List of acts of the 3rd Parliament of Queen Elizabeth I
- List of parliaments of England
