= Sumptuary law =

Laws controlling consumption and apparel

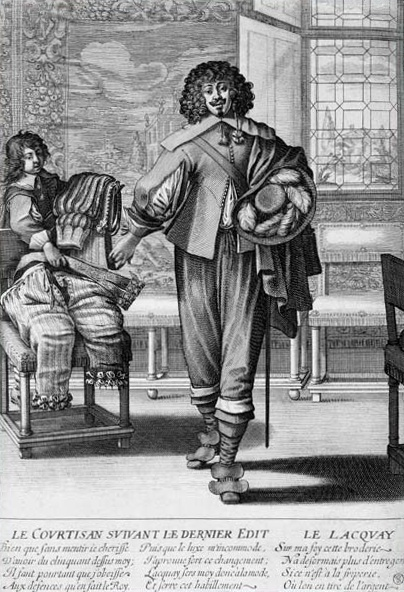
Le Courtisan suivant le Dernier Édit by Abraham Bosse – a French courtier casting aside lace, ribbons and slashed sleeves in favor of sober dress in accordance with the edict of 1633

Sumptuary laws (from Latin sūmptuāriae lēgēs) are laws that regulate consumption. Black's Law Dictionary defines them as "Laws made for the purpose of restraining luxury or extravagance, particularly against inordinate expenditures for apparel, food, furniture, or shoes, etc." Historically, they were intended to regulate and reinforce social hierarchies and morals through restrictions on clothing, food, and luxury expenditures, often depending on a person's social rank.

Societies have employed sumptuary laws for various purposes. They were used to try to regulate the balance of trade by limiting the market for expensive imported goods. They made it easy to identify social status and privilege, and as such could be used for social discrimination and to stabilize social hierarchies. They could also be used to prevent, or at least reduce, opportunities for political bribery and corruption.

The laws often prevented commoners from imitating the appearance of aristocrats and could be used to stigmatize disfavoured groups. In cities of the Late Middle Ages, sumptuary laws were instituted as a way for the nobility to limit the conspicuous consumption of the prosperous bourgeoisie. Bourgeois subjects as wealthy as or wealthier than the nobility could undermine the latter's presentation as powerful and legitimate rulers. This could call into question their ability to control and defend their fiefs, thus inspiring traitors and rebels. Such laws continued to be used for these purposes well into the 17th century.

According to historian Lorraine Daston, sumptuary laws "furnish the historian of rules with an extreme case of rule failure," as such laws frequently failed to reduce excess and may even have exacerbated excess. Sumptuary laws were often revisable regulations rather than stable laws, as governing authorities sought to prohibit the latest rebellious or extravagant fashions.

== Classical world ==
=== Ancient Greece ===
The 7th century BCE law text of the Locrians by Zaleucus, the first written code of law in ancient Greece, stipulated:

A free-born woman may not be accompanied by more than one female slave, unless she is drunk; she may not leave the city during the night, unless she is planning to commit adultery; (Note: Ancient Greek: μοιχεία) she may not wear gold jewelry or a garment with a purple border, unless she is a courtesan; and a husband may not wear a gold-studded ring or a cloak of Milesian fashion unless he is bent upon prostitution or adultery.

It also banned the drinking of undiluted wine except for medical purposes.

=== Ancient Rome ===
The Sumptuariae Leges of ancient Rome were various laws passed to prevent inordinate expense (Latin sūmptus) in banquets and dress, such as the use of expensive Tyrian purple dye. Roman senators and senior magistrates were entitled to wear a Tyrian purple stripe on their toga and tunic. In the early years of the Roman Empire, men were forbidden to wear silk, which was deemed an effeminate and morally suspect material. During the height of the Empire, expenditure on silk imported from China was so high that imperial advisers warned that Roman silver reserves were becoming exhausted.

The Roman censors had a duty to put a check upon morals and extravagance in personal and political expenditure. The censors published details of offences in the nota censoria, which listed the names of everyone found guilty of a luxurious mode of living; a great many instances of this kind are recorded. Towards the end of the Roman Republic, laws were passed against political corruption of Roman magistrates, forbidding their attendance at banquets given by candidates or their agents. During the period of transition from Republic to Empire, such antisumptuary laws, which may have still existed were virtually ignored by most. In the period of profligate luxury goods that characterized the height of the Roman Empire, the laws regarding the wearing of Tyrian purple were rigorously enforced. Infringement of this prohibition was treasonous, so punishable by death.

Roman sumptuary laws applied to both the living and the dead. Rome's most ancient laws, the laws of the Twelve Tables, forbade extravagant expenses at funerals. This included the pouring of wine over the ashes at cremations (which seems nevertheless to have been an invariable practise), the use of smoothed timbers in funeral pyres, and "excessive" mourning.

== East Asia ==
=== China ===
Sumptuary laws existed in China in one form or another from the Qin dynasty onward (221 BC). The Confucian virtue of restraint was embodied in the scholarly system central to China's bureaucracy and became encoded in its laws.

Some laws concerned the size and decoration of graves and mausoleums. The Hongwu Emperor, founder of the Ming dynasty, issued such regulations in the first year of his rule (1368) and tightened them in 1396, allowing only the highest nobility and officials of the top three ranks a memorial stele installed on top of a stone tortoise; the steles of lower-level mandarins were perched on rectangular pedestals, while commoners had to be satisfied with a simple gravestone. The location of graves and the number of attendant statues depended on rank.

After c. 1550, sumptuary law in China was reformed. It had long been ineffective. The consumption of luxuries had risen over the previous several centuries, and at the time of the Industrial Revolution in Europe, Chinese consumption of luxuries such as tea, sugar, fine silk, tobacco, and eating utensils was on a par with the core regions of Europe.

=== Japan ===
According to Britannica Online, "In feudal Japan, sumptuary laws were passed with a frequency and minuteness of scope that had no parallel in the history of the Western world." During the Edo period (1603–1868), people of every class were subject to strict sumptuary laws, including regulation of the types of clothing that could be worn. In the second half of that period (the 18th and 19th centuries), the chōnin merchant class had grown far wealthier than the aristocratic samurai, and these laws sought to maintain the superiority of the samurai class despite the merchants being able to afford far more luxurious clothing and other items. The shogunate eventually gave in and allowed certain concessions, including allowing merchants of a certain prestige to wear a single sword at their belt; samurai were required to wear a matched pair when on official duty.

== Islamic world ==
Islamic sumptuary laws are based upon teachings found in the Quran and Hadith. Males are exhorted not to wear silk clothes, nor have jewelry made of gold. Likewise, wearing clothes or robes that drag on the ground, seen as a sign of vanity and excessive pride, is also forbidden. These rules do not apply to women, who are allowed all this, but also need to cover their bodies and hair.

Prohibition of depictions of human and animal figures in general are similar to those of the Quranic prohibition on graven images. Hadiths do allow the depiction of animals on clothing items.

== Africa ==
Most sumptuary regulation in Africa requires that parts of certain species (e.g. fur, feathers) only be worn by people of certain ranks. For example, among Zulus the feathers of blue cranes and turacos must only be worn by monarchs. This can be understood as having an ecological benefit as these are rare birds.

== Medieval and Renaissance Europe ==
Sumptuary laws issued by secular authorities, aimed at keeping the main population dressed according to their "station", do not begin until the later 13th century. These laws were addressed to the entire social body, but the brunt of regulations was directed at women and the middle classes. Their curbing of display was ordinarily couched in religious and moralizing vocabulary, yet was affected by social and economic considerations aimed at preventing ruinous expense among the wealthy classes and the drain of capital reserves to foreign suppliers.

=== Courtesans ===
Special forms of dress for prostitutes and courtesans were introduced during the 13th century – in Marseille, a striped cloak, in England a striped hood, and so on. Over time, these tended to be reduced to distinctive bands of fabric attached to the arm or shoulder, or tassels on the arm. Later restrictions specified various forms of finery that were forbidden, although there was also sometimes a recognition that finery represented working equipment (and capital) for a prostitute, and they could be exempted from laws applying to other non-noble women. By the 15th century, no compulsory clothing seems to have been imposed on prostitutes in Florence, Venice, or Paris.

=== England ===
As early as the 12th century, certain articles of clothing were prohibited to crusaders and pilgrims traveling to the Holy Land under the Saladin Tithe of 1188, but scant evidence exists in the historical record of legal regulations on dress in Britain until the reign of Edward III, during which prohibitions were enacted on the import of textiles from lands outside Ireland, England, Scotland, and Wales and the exportation of domestically produced wool was likewise banned. The statute contained further restrictions on clothing based on social class; the earliest example of class-based restriction was that of fur, prohibited for anyone below the rank of lady or knight. The restriction on fur was expanded in subsequent decades in London to restrict prostitutes from wearing any furs, including budge (low-quality wool) or lambswool.

In England, which in this respect was typical of Europe, from the reign of Edward III in the Middle Ages until well into the 17th century, sumptuary laws dictated what colour and type of clothing, furs, fabrics, and trims were allowed to persons of various ranks or incomes. In the case of clothing, this was intended, amongst other reasons, to reduce spending on foreign textiles and to ensure that people did not dress "above their station":

The excess of apparel and the superfluity of unnecessary foreign wares thereto belonging now of late years is grown by sufferance to such an extremity that the manifest decay of the whole realm generally is like to follow (by bringing into the realm such superfluities of silks, cloths of gold, silver, and other most vain devices of so great cost for the quantity thereof as of necessity the moneys and treasure of the realm is and must be yearly conveyed out of the same to answer the said excess) but also particularly the wasting and undoing of a great number of young gentlemen, otherwise serviceable, and others seeking by show of apparel to be esteemed as gentlemen, who, allured by the vain show of those things, do not only consume themselves, their goods, and lands which their parents left unto them, but also run into such debts and shifts as they cannot live out of danger of laws without attempting unlawful acts, whereby they are not any ways serviceable to their country as otherwise they might be

— Statute issued at Greenwich, 15 June 1574, by order of Elizabeth I

The first major sumptuary act was passed in April 1463 during the reign of Edward IV. Earlier statutes had sought to control the expense of household liveries, but the April 1463 statute marked the first attempt at a comprehensive sumptuary legislation. Scholars have interpreted the act as part of a set of protectionist economic measures that included regulations of the textile industry and trade in cloths. This statute is the first known English legislation restricting the use of "royal purple" – a term which, during the Middle Ages, referred not only to the Tyrian purple of Antiquity, but also to crimson, dark reds and royal blue. The language of the act uses technical terminology to restrict certain features of garments that are decorative in function, intended to enhance the silhouette.

A second "Act of Apparel" followed in January 1483 restricting cloth-of-gold, sable, ermine, velvet on velvet and satin brocade to knights and lords. Damask and satin were allowed for yeoman of the Crown and esquires and other members of the gentry, only if they had a yearly income of £40. Bustian, fustian, scarlet-dyed cloths and any leathers or animal hides other than lambskins were also restricted.

An act of Parliament, the Caps Act 1571 (13 Eliz. 1. c. 19) to stimulate domestic wool consumption and general trade decreed that on Sundays and holidays, all males over six years of age, except for the nobility and persons of degree, were to wear woolen caps on pain of a fine of three farthings (3/4 penny) per day. This law instituted the flat cap as part of English wear. The 1571 act was repealed in 1597 by the Continuance, etc. of Laws Act 1597 (39 Eliz. 1. c. 18).

An extremely long list of items, specifying colour, materials, and sometimes place of manufacture (imported goods being much more tightly restricted) followed for each sex, with equally specific exceptions by rank of nobility or position held. For the most part, these laws seem to have had little effect, though the Parliament of England made repeated amendments to the laws, and several monarchs, most notably the Tudors, continually called for stricter enforcement, especially at Court "to the intent there may be a difference of estates known by their apparel after the commendable custom in times past."

The laws were justified by the reasoning that the price of certain goods increased to levels where "the treasure of the land is destroyed, to the great damage of the lords and the commonality" when "various people or various conditions wear various apparel not appropriate to their estate".

Adam Smith was against the necessity or convenience of sumptuary laws, he wrote: "of It is the highest impertinence and presumption... in kings and ministers, to pretend to watch over the economy of private people, and to restrain their expense... They are themselves always, and without any exception, the greatest spendthrifts in the society. Let them look well after their own expense, and they may safely trust private people with theirs. If their own extravagance does not ruin the state, that of their subjects never will."

=== Italy ===
During the medieval and Renaissance eras in Italy, various towns passed sumptuary laws (leggi suntuarie) often in response to particular events or movements. For example, Bernardino of Siena, in his public sermons in Siena, thundered against the vanity of luxurious dress; this, however, was counterbalanced by the economic benefit Siena derived as a manufacturer of items, including clothes, of luxury. One source describes these types of laws as constantly published, and generally ignored. These laws, mostly aimed at female apparel, sometimes became a source of revenue for the state: the Florentine laws of 1415 restricted the luxury that could be worn by women, but exempted those willing to pay 50 florins a year. The laws were often quite specific. Low necklines were prohibited in Genoa, Milan, and Rome in the early 16th century, and laws restricting zibellini (sable furs carried as fashion accessories) with heads and feet of precious metals and jewels were issued in Bologna in 1545 and Milan in 1565.

=== France ===
Montaigne's brief essay "On sumptuary laws" criticized 16th-century French laws, beginning:

The way by which our laws attempt to regulate idle and vain expenses in meat and clothes, seems to be quite contrary to the end designed… For to enact that none but princes shall eat turbot, shall wear velvet or gold lace, and interdict these things to the people, what is it but to bring them into a greater esteem, and to set every one more agog to eat and wear them?

He also cites Plato and Zaleucus.

=== Scotland ===
One of the earliest known Scottish sumptuary regulations was passed in 1429 during the reign of James I of Scotland. The text, written in Old Scots, preserves some medieval legal terminology related to textiles, limiting silk, some types of furs (pine martens, beech martens) and other items to men of certain social ranks like knight, lord, burgess, and their families. As with the laws of Henry V of England in 1420, silver plating was reserved for the spurs of knights and the apparel of barons or higher ranking persons. Metalsmiths caught violating these laws would be punished by death and all their lands and goods forfeit. Embroidery and pearls were also restricted. Yeomen and commoners could not wear colored clothes longer than the knee. The poke sleeve that narrowed at the wrist were allowed for sentinel yeomen who lived in their lord's house and rode with the gentlemen. Commoners' wives could not wear long-tail hoods or side-necked hoods, poked sleeves, or caps made from rich textiles like Lawn cloth or Rheims (fine linen).

John Knox criticised the appearance of the gentlewomen of Mary, Queen of Scots during Parliament in 1563 as a "stinking pride of women" and wrote that preachers denounced the "taregetting of their taillies" (apparently the embellishment of their costumes). There were calls for reform by sumptuary law "for order to be taken for apparel". In November 1581, Parliament made an act against the excess of "coistlie cleithing" which was intended to prevent those of "mean estate" counterfeiting the courtly fashion for gold embroidery and imported luxury fabrics. It was hoped the act would promote manufacture at home. It was renewed in 1595 and 1612.

The Dress Act 1746, which formed part of the Act of Proscription issued under George II following the Jacobite rising of 1745, made the wearing of Highland dress, including tartan and kilts, illegal in Scotland (an exemption was made for soldiers and veterans). The act, which was poorly enforced, was eventually repealed in 1782, and during the Regency and Victorian eras Highland dress gained widespread popularity in part thanks to the visit of George IV to Scotland in 1822, which was organised by Scottish writer Walter Scott.

== Early modern era ==
Sumptuary laws were repealed in the early 17th century, but new protectionist laws were passed prohibiting the purchase of foreign silks and laces. Prohibitions were tied to rank and income and continued to be widely ignored.

=== Ireland ===
During the late 16th century, John Perrot, the Lord Deputy of Ireland under Elizabeth I, banned the wearing of traditional woollen mantles, "open smocks" with "great sleeves", and native headdresses, requiring the people to dress in "civil garments" in the English style.

=== France ===
In 1629 and 1633, Louis XIII of France issued edicts regulating "Superfluity of Dress" that prohibited anyone but princes and the nobility from wearing gold embroidery or caps, shirts, collars, and cuffs embroidered with metallic threads or lace, and puffs, slashes, and bunches of ribbon were severely restricted. As with other such laws, these were widely disregarded and enforced in a lax manner. A series of popular engravings by Abraham Bosse depicts the supposed effects of this law.

=== Colonial America ===
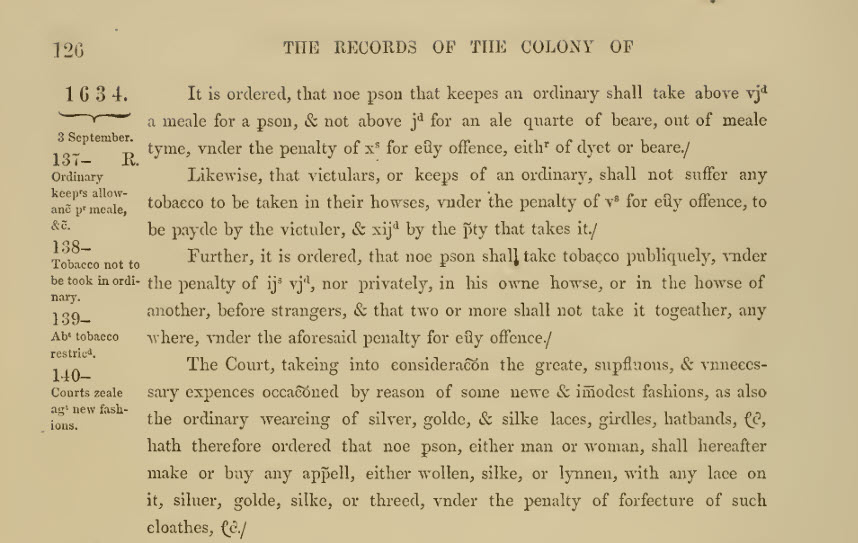
Colonial Massachusetts sumptuary law prohibiting lace, 1634

In the Massachusetts Bay Colony, a 1634 prohibition deemed that only people with a personal fortune of at least two hundred pounds could wear lace, silver or gold thread or buttons, cutwork, embroidery, hatbands, belts, ruffles, capes, and other articles. After a few decades, the law was being widely defied. By 1651, flouting of the rules caused leadership to issue a new strongly worded regulation to the populace again. In the Province of South Carolina, the 1712 slave code forbade slaves in the colony to wear clothes finer than "Negro cloth".

== Modern era ==
While rarely do restrictions exist on the type or quality of clothing, beyond maintenance of public decency, wearing certain types of clothing is restricted to specific occupations, specifically the uniforms of organisations like the police and military.

In some jurisdictions, clothing or other visible signs of religious or political opinion (e.g. Nazi imagery in Germany) are forbidden in certain public places.

Many American states in the 20th century prohibited the wearing of Ku Klux Klan hoods, masks, masquerade, or drag; gay men in New York City seized on the exemption for masquerade balls in the 1920s to 1930s to go in drag.

In Bhutan, the wearing of traditional dress (which also has an ethnic connotation) in certain places, such as when visiting government offices, was made compulsory in 1989 under the driglam namzha laws. Part of the traditional dress includes the kabney, a long scarf whose coloring is regulated. Only the King of Bhutan and Chief Abbot may don the saffron scarf, with various other colors reserved for government and religious officers, and white available for common people.

== Pejorative uses of term ==
The term sumptuary law has been used as a pejorative term to describe any governmental control of consumption based on moral, religious, health, or public safety, or other concerns. American Judge Thomas M. Cooley generally described their modern form as laws that "substitute the legislative judgment for that of the proprietor, regarding the manner in which he should use and employ his property." Policies to which the term has been critically applied include alcohol prohibition, drug prohibition, smoking bans, and restrictions on dog fighting.

=== Alcohol prohibition ===
As early as 1860, Anthony Trollope, writing about his experiences in Maine under the state's prohibition law, stated, "This law (prohibition), like all sumptuary laws, must fail." In 1918, William Howard Taft decried prohibition in the United States as a bad sumptuary law, stating that one of his reasons for opposing prohibition was his belief that "sumptuary laws are matters for parochial adjustment." Taft later repeated this concern. The Indiana Supreme Court also discussed alcohol prohibition as a sumptuary law in its 1855 decision Herman v. State. During state conventions on the ratification of the Twenty-first Amendment to the United States Constitution in 1933, numerous delegates throughout the United States decried prohibition as having been an improper sumptuary law that never should have been included in the Constitution of the United States.

In 1971, a United States federal study stated that federal laws on alcohol include "sumptuary laws which are directed at the purchaser", including, "Sales are not permitted to minors or intoxicated persons. Credit is often prohibited on liquor sales, as well. Criminal penalties may be imposed for driving under the influence of alcohol, as well as for drunken behavior."

=== Drug prohibition ===
When the U.S. state of Washington considered cannabis decriminalization in two initiatives, 229 and 248, the initiatives' language stated, "Cannabis prohibition is a sumptuary law of a nature repugnant to our Constitution's framers."

== See also ==
- Statute Concerning Diet and Apparel 1363
