= Bankruptcy (England) Act 1824 =

Act of the Parliament of the United Kingdom

- Act of Parliament
- Parliament of the United Kingdom
- Long title: An Act to consolidate and amend the Bankrupt Laws.
- Citation: 5 Geo. 4. c. 98
- Introduced by: Thomas Courtenay MP (Commons)
- Territorial extent: England and Wales (Note: Section 132.)

Dates
- Royal assent: 21 June 1824
- Commencement: 1 May 1825 (Note: Section 133.)
- Repealed: 2 May 1825
Other legislation
Amends	See § Repealed enactments
Repeals/revokes	See § Repealed enactments
Repealed by	Bankruptcy Act 1825
Relates to	Masters and Workmen Arbitration Act 1824; Bankrupt Law Consolidation Act 1849; Bankruptcy Act 1914

Status: Repealed

Text of statute as originally enacted

The Bankruptcy (England) Act 1824 (5 Geo. 4. c. 98) was an act of the Parliament of the United Kingdom that consolidated and amended enactments relating to UK insolvency law.

== Passage ==
Leave to bring in the Bankrupt Laws Bill to the House of Commons was granted on 18 February 1824 to Thomas Courtenay MP, the attorney general, John Singleton Copley MP and John Smith MP. The bill had its first reading in the House of Commons on 23 February 1824, presented by Thomas Courtenay MP. The bill had its second reading in the House of Commons on 25 February 1824 and was committed to a committee of the whole house, which met on and reported on 26 February 1824, with amendments. The amended bill was considered on 5 April 1824 and was re-committed to a committee of the whole house which met and reported on 12 April 1824, with amendments. The amended bill was considered on 25 May and the amended bill had its third reading in the House of Commons on 31 May 1824 and passed, with amendments.

The bill had its first reading in the House of Lords on 1 June 1824. The bill had its second reading in the House of Lords on 4 June 1824 and was committed to a committee of the whole house, which met on 15 June 1824 and 17 June 1824 and reported on 17 June 1824, with amendments. The amended bill had its third reading in the House of Lords on 18 June 1824, with amendments.

The amended bill was considered and agreed to by the House of Commons on 19 June 1824.

The bill was granted royal assent on 21 June 1824.

== Provisions ==
=== Repealed enactments ===
Section 1 of the act repealed 20 enactments, listed in that section.

Citation	Short title	Description	Extent of repeal
34 & 35 Hen. 8. c. 4	Bankruptcy Act 1542	An Act passed in the Thirty fourth 5 and Thirty fifth Years of the Reign of King Henry the Eighth, intituled An Act against such Persons as do make Bankrupt.	The whole act.
13 Eliz. 1. c. 7	Bankrupts Act 1571	An Act passed in the Thirteenth Year of the Reign of Queen Elizabeth, intituled An Act touching Orders for Bankrupts.	The whole act.
1 Jac. 1. c. 15	Bankrupts Act 1603	An Act passed in the First Year of the Reign of King James 15 the First, intituled An Act for the better Relief of the Creditors against such as shall become Bankrupt.	The whole act.
21 Jac. 1. c. 19	Bankrupts Act 1623	An Act passed in the Twenty first Year of the Reign of King James the First, 20 intituled An Act for the further Description of a Bankrupt, and Relief of Creditors against such as shall become Bankrupt, and for inflicting Corporal Punishment upon the Bankrupts, in some special Cases.	The whole act.
13 & 14 Cha. 2. c. 24	Bankrupts Act 1662	An Act passed in the Thirteenth and Fourteenth Years of the Reign of King Charles the Second, intituled An Act declaratory concerning Bankrupts.	The whole act.
10 Ann. c. 25 (Note: This is the citation in The Statutes of the Realm.) 10 Ann. c. 15 (Note: This is the citation in The Statutes at Large.)	Bankrupts Act 1711	An Act passed in the Tenth Year of the Reign of Queen Anne, intituled An Act for repealing a Clause in the above-mentioned Statute, passed in the Twenty first Year of the Reign of King James the First, and for the Explanation of the Laws relating to Bankruptcy in Cases of Partnership.	The whole act.
7 Geo. 1. St. 1. c. 31	Bankrupts Act 1720	An Act for explaining and making more effectual the several Acts concerning Bankrupts.	The whole act.
5 Geo. 2. c. 30	Bankrupts Act 1731	An Act passed in the Fifth Year of the Reign of King George the Second, intituled An Act to prevent the committing of Frauds by Bankrupts.	The whole act.
19 Geo. 2. c. 32	Bankrupts Act 1745	An Act passed in the Nineteenth Year of the Reign of King George the Second, intituled An Act for amending the Laws relating to Bankrupts.	The whole act.
24 Geo. 2. c. 57	Continuance of Laws (No.2) Act 1750	an Act passed in the Twenty fourth Year of the Reign of King George the Second, the Title of which begins with the Words 40 An Act to continue several Laws therein mentioned, for preventing Theft and Rapine, and concludes with the Words, and to make some further Provisions in relation to the signing of Certificates for the Discharge of Bankrupts.	As relates to the Prevention of Frauds by Bankrupts, and to some further Provisions in relation to the signing of Certificates for the Discharge of Bankrupts. I.e., sections 9 and 10.
4 Geo. 3. c. 33	Bankrupts Act 1763	An Act passed in the Fourth Year of the Reign of His late Majesty King George the Third, intituled An Act for preventing Inconveniencies arising in Cases of Merchants, and such other Persons as are within the Description of the Statutes relating to Bankrupts being entitled to Privilege of Parliament, and becoming insolvent.	The whole act.
36 Geo. 3. c. 90	Bank of England Stock Act 1796	An Act passed in the Thirty sixth Year of the Reign of His late Majesty King George the Third, the Relief of Persons equitably and beneficially entitled to or interested in the several Stocks and Annuities transferrable at the Bank of England.	As relates to Trustees in whose Names Stock shall be standing at the Bank, becoming Bankrupt, and to Bankrupts refusing to transfer Stock standing in their own Right. I.e., sections 1 and 2.
37 Geo. 3. c. 124	Bankrupts Act 1797	An Act passed in the Thirty seventh Year of the Reign of His late Majesty, intituled An Act to make perpetual an Act passed in the Fifth Year of the Reign of His late Majesty, intituled An Act to prevent the committing of Frauds by Bankrupts.	The whole act.
45 Geo. 3. c. 124	Privilege of Parliament Act 1805	An Act passed in the Forty fifth Year of the Reign of His late Majesty, intituled An Act to amend an Act passed in the First Year of His present Majesty, intituled An Act for preventing Inconveniencies arising in Cases of Merchants, and such other Persons as are within the Description of the Statutes relating to Bankrupts being entitled to Privilege of Parliament, and becoming insolvent ; and to prevent Delay in the entering Appearances in Actions brought against Persons having Privilege of Parliament.	As relates to the Execution of certain Bonds by Traders having Privilege of Parliament, and to the Disobedience by such Traders to Orders for Payment of Money. I.e., sections 1 and 8.
46 Geo. 3. c. 135	Bankrupts Act 1806	An Act passed in the Forty sixth Year of the Reign of His late Majesty, intituled An Act to amend the Laws relating to Bankrupts.	The whole act.
49 Geo. 3. c. 121	Bankrupts (England and Ireland) Act 1809	An Act passed in the Forty ninth Year of the Reign of His late Majesty, intituled An Act to alter and amend the Laws relating to Bankrupts.	The whole act.
56 Geo. 3. c. 137	Bankrupts (England) Act 1816	an Act passed in the Fifty sixth Year of the Reign of His late Majesty, intituled An Act to extend the Pro- visions of an Act of the First Year of the Reign of King James the First, intituled An Act for the better Relief of the Creditors against such as shall become Bankrupts.	The whole act.
1 Geo. 4. c. 115	Capital Punishment Act 1820	an Act passed in the First Year of the Reign of His present Majesty, intituled An Act to repeal so much of the several Acts passed in the Thirty ninth Year of the Reign of Elizabeth, the Fourth of George the First, the Fifth and the Eighth of George the Second, as inflicts Capital Punishment on certain Offences therein specified, and to provide more suitable and effectual Punishment for such Offences.	As relates to the Punishment of Frauds committed by Bankrupts.
3 Geo. 4. c. 74	Bankrupts Act 1822	An Act passed in the Third Year of the Reign of His present Majesty, intituled An Act to prevent the Laws relating to Bankrupts under joint Commissions.	The whole act.
3 Geo. 4. c. 81	Bankrupt Laws (England) Act 1822	Another Act passed in the Third Year of the Reign of His present Majesty, intituled An Act to amend the Laws relating to Bankrupts.	The whole act.

== Subsequent developments ==
The whole act was repealed by section 1 of the Bankruptcy Act 1825 (6 Geo. 4. c. 16), which came into force on 2 May 1825.
