= History of bankruptcy law in the United States =

The history of bankruptcy law in the United States refers primarily to a series of acts of Congress regarding the nature of bankruptcy. As the legal regime for bankruptcy in the United States developed, it moved from a system which viewed bankruptcy as a quasi-criminal act, to one focused on solving and repaying debts for people and businesses suffering heavy losses.

== Pre-Independence ==
In the Thirteen Colonies, laws regarding the payment and collection of debt were based on English common law. Debtors who were unable to repay their debts had property confiscated and assigned to the creditor, or were imprisoned.

== Eighteenth and nineteenth centuries ==
Upon the ratification of the United States Constitution in 1789, Congress was given the power under Article I, Section 8, Clause 4 to legislate for "uniform laws on the subject of Bankruptcies" throughout the United States. Congress's first law on the subject was the Bankruptcy Act of 1800, which was limited to traders and provided only for involuntary proceedings. This was repealed in 1803. Having gone through bankruptcy himself in 1816, author John Neal played a prominent role in the late 1810s and early 1820s in the movement to adopt a nationwide bankruptcy law and ban imprisonment for debt. Diplomat Edmund Roberts, President Andrew Jackson's envoy to the Far East, incorporated American concepts of bankruptcy protection into Article VI of the Roberts Treaty with Siam of 1833. Voluntary bankruptcy in the United States was first allowed by the Acts of 1841, and 1867. These early acts and the Bankruptcy Act of 1898, known as the Nelson Act, established the modern concepts of debtor-creditor relations.

== Twentieth century ==
Also known as the Chandler Act, the Bankruptcy Act of 1938 expanded voluntary access to the bankruptcy system, and voluntary petitions were made more attractive to debtors. The Chandler Act gave authority to the Securities and Exchange Commission in the administration of bankruptcy filings.

The Bankruptcy Reform Act of 1978, commonly referred to as the Bankruptcy Code, constituted a major overhaul of the bankruptcy system. It covered cases filed after October 1, 1979. The 1978 Act contained four titles. Title I was the amended Title 11 of the U.S. Code. Title II contained amendments to Title 28 of the U.S. Code and the Federal Rules of Evidence. Title III made the necessary changes in other federal legislation affected by the bankruptcy law changes. Title IV provided for the repeal of pre-Code bankruptcy, the effective dates of portions of the new law, necessary savings provisions, interim housekeeping details, and the pilot program of the United States trustee.

Perhaps the most important changes to bankruptcy law under the 1978 Act, however, were to the courts themselves. The 1978 Act drastically altered the structure of the bankruptcy courts and conferred pervasive subject matter jurisdiction upon the courts. The act granted the new jurisdiction over all "civil proceedings arising under title 11 or arising in or related to cases under title 11." 28 U.S.C. §1471(b) (1976 ed. Supp.) While the new courts were denominated adjuncts of the district court, they were in practice free standing courts. The expanded jurisdiction was to be exercised primarily by bankruptcy judges. The bankruptcy judge would continue to be an Article I judge, who was appointed for a set term.

The provisions of the 1978 Act came under scrutiny in the case of Northern Pipeline Co. v. Marathon Pipe Line Co., 458 U.S. 50, 102 S. Ct. 2858, 73 L. Ed.2d 598 [6 C.B.C.2d 785] (1982). The Court held unconstitutional the broad grant of jurisdiction to bankruptcy judges because those judges were not appointed under and protected by the provisions of Article III of the Constitution. Under the United States Constitution, the Article III judges hold their offices during good behavior (an appointment for life), and their salary cannot be reduced during their tenure in office. Article I judges do not enjoy such rights. The jurisdictional challenge started when a creditor filed an adversary proceeding in bankruptcy court, which covered issues such as breach of contract, warranty, and misrepresentation. The bankruptcy court denied the defendant's motion to dismiss, and the defendant appealed to the district court. The district court held that 28 U.S.C. §1471 violated Article III of the Constitution because it delegated Article III powers to a non-Article III court by its broad grant of jurisdiction to the bankruptcy courts. In a plurality opinion, the Supreme Court held that the broad grant of jurisdiction accorded bankruptcy courts by 28 U.S.C. '1471 was an unconstitutional delegation of Article III powers to a non-Article III court. Similarly, Section 241(a) of the Bankruptcy Reform Act of 1978, by establishing the jurisdictional provisions set forth in 28 U.S.C. '1471 was held unconstitutional. The Court stayed its judgment until October 4, 1982, to give "Congress an opportunity to reconstitute the bankruptcy courts or to adopt other valid means of adjudication, without impairing the interim administration of the bankruptcy laws." Id. 458 U.S. at 89. After the stay had expired, Congress still failed to act. Instead, a model "emergency rule" was adopted as a local rule by the district courts. The purpose of the rule was to avoid the collapse of the bankruptcy system, and it was a temporary measure to provide for the orderly administration of bankruptcy cases and proceedings after Marathon. The rule remained in effect until enactment of the 1984 legislation on July 10, 1984. Although the constitutionality of the "emergency rule" was under constant attack, the Supreme Court consistently denied certiorari.

The effects of the 1978 Act on grain elevator bankruptcies were unpopular, leading to Wayne Cryts' protest.

In 1984, Congress implemented a "permanent" legislative solution to the issues addressed in Marathon by enacting the Bankruptcy Amendments and Federal Judgeship Act of 1984. By this act, with few exceptions, such as the trial of personal injury and wrongful death claims and matters that require consideration of both Title 11 and organizations or activities affecting interstate commerce, the new bankruptcy courts were allowed to exercise all of the subject matter jurisdiction of the district courts. Thus, bankruptcy courts were allowed to hear cases such as Marathon.

The Act of 1984 in many ways resembled the Bankruptcy Act of 1898. Among other things, the law provided for the re-designation of separate units for bankruptcy judges under the district court system. Bankruptcy cases pending on or filed after July 10, 1984, are subject to most of the amendments relating to bankruptcy jurisdiction. The Bankruptcy Judges, United States Trustees, and Family Farmer Bankruptcy Act of 1986 made substantive changes relating to family farmers and established a permanent United States trustee system. The 1986 Act applies to cases filed since November 26, 1986. The Bankruptcy Reform Act of 1994 is effective as to cases filed on or after October 22, 1994. The reform act and the case law interpreting its provisions have a great impact upon the mortgage banking industry and the servicers of mortgage loans.

== Twenty-first century ==
- Bankruptcy Abuse Prevention and Consumer Protection Act of 2005.

== See also ==
- UK insolvency law
- US corporate law
