= Bankruptcy judge =

A bankruptcy judge in the United States is a federal judicial officer who presides over a bankruptcy court. Bankruptcy judges are officers of the district court in which their bankruptcy court is located, but do not have the full power of district court judges. As of 2023, there were 298 bankruptcy judges in authorized positions along with 26 retired bankruptcy judges who had been recalled to service.

Unlike Article III judges, bankruptcy judges do not serve lifetime appointments and are not approved by Congress. Instead, they are appointed to 14-year terms by the relevant circuit court of appeals. Each circuit follows a different selection process, which is typically merit-based. The circuit court's selections are made from a list prepared by the judicial council of the circuit.

The degree of authority of a bankruptcy judge varies depending on the nature of the matter. If a dispute between the parties relates to a core matter of bankruptcy, then the bankruptcy judge can issue a final ruling. If the dispute relates to a non-core matter, then the bankruptcy judge can hear the dispute and issue findings of fact and conclusions of law, but these are subject to de novo review by a district judge. A bankruptcy judge also does not have access to the full range of case management tools held by a district court judge, and is for example unable to appoint a special master in complex cases.

Bankruptcy judges are represented by the National Conference of Bankruptcy Judges.

== History ==
The modern position of bankruptcy judge replaced the earlier position of Referee in Bankruptcy. The change in terminology began in 1973 with the adoption of the Federal Rules of Bankruptcy Procedure, which referred to referees as bankruptcy judges. In the same year the existing National Conference of Referees in Bankruptcy changed its name to the National Conference of Bankruptcy Judges. These bankruptcy judges, like the referees before them, were appointed by the district court and were often appointed on the basis of local political connections.

The enactment of the Bankruptcy Reform Act of 1978 changed the role of bankruptcy judge to one more closely resembling its modern form, with 14-year appointments. While referees/judges had previously had a participatory role in shepherding the bankruptcy process along, the 1978 Act changed this to a more traditionally judge-like role limited to resolving disputes raised by the parties.

Under the 1978 Act, judges were appointed by the president and confirmed by the Senate. The 1978 Act set a six-year transition period to the new system, but in 1982 the Supreme Court ruled in Northern Pipeline Construction Co. v. Marathon Pipe Line Co. that the judgeships created under the 1978 Act were unconstitutional under Article III of the US Constitution.

The Bankruptcy Amendments and Federal Judgeship Act of 1984 addressed the Northern Pipeline decision by creating the modern system under which bankruptcy judges are appointed by the circuit courts. The subsequent cases Stern v. Marshall (2011) and Executive Benefits Insurance Agency v. Arkison (2014) further limited the power of bankruptcy judges by holding, respectively, that they could not issue final judgments on common law matters even if they are within core bankruptcy jurisdiction, and that this constitutional issue could be cured by issuing proposed findings of fact and conclusions of law to be reviewed de novo by the district court.

== See also ==
- Bankruptcy in the United States
