= 7 Geo. 1 =

7 Geo. 1 can be a citation used to refer to acts of the Parliament from two different sessions:

- 7 Geo. 1. St. 1, the sixth session of the 5th Parliament of Great Britain, dated 1720
- 7 Geo. 1. St. 2, the seventh session of the 5th Parliament of Great Britain, dated 1721
