= Ipswich Improvement Act 1571 =

Act of the Parliament of England

Ipswich Improvement Act 1571 (Note: The citation of this act by this short title was authorised by section 5 of, and the second schedule to, the Statute Law Revision Act 1948. Due to the repeal of those provisions, it is now authorised by section 19(2) of the Interpretation Act 1978.)
- Act of Parliament
- Parliament of England
- Long title: An Act for the paving of the Town of Ipsewiche.
- Citation: 13 Eliz. 1. c. 24
- Territorial extent: England and Wales

Dates
- Royal assent: 29 May 1571
- Commencement: 2 April 1571 (Note: Start of session.)
- Repealed: 30 June 1837
Other legislation
Repealed by	Ipswich Improvement Act 1837

Status: Repealed

Text of statute as originally enacted

The Ipswich Improvement Act 1571 (13 Eliz. 1. c. 24) was an act of the Parliament of England, which empowered the Ipswich Corporation to raise rates for paving the streets of Ipswich, Suffolk.

== The act ==
The act required landlords, owners or tenants to ensure that the street in front of their property was paved and kept clean. The headboroughs of the four wards of the town, as leet officer were charged with overseeing this and they could fine anyone who neglected their duty.

== Subsequent developments ==
The whole act was repealed by section 1 of the Ipswich Improvement Act 1837 (7 Will. 4 & 1 Vict. c. lxxiii), which came into force on 30 June 1837.
