= Fines and Recoveries Act 1833 =

Act of the Parliament of the United Kingdom

Fines and Recoveries Act 1833 (Note: The citation of this act by this short title was authorised by section 1 of, and the first schedule to, the Short Titles Act 1896. Due to the repeal of those provisions it is now authorised by section 19(2) of the Interpretation Act 1978.)
- Act of Parliament
- Parliament of the United Kingdom
- Long title: An Act for the abolition of fines and recoveries, and for the substitution of more simple modes of assurance.
- Citation: 3 & 4 Will. 4. c. 74
- Territorial extent: England and Wales (Note: Section 92.)

Dates
- Royal assent: 28 August 1833
- Commencement: 28 August 1833 (Note: The Acts of Parliament (Commencement) Act 1793.)
Other legislation
Amends	Bankruptcy Act 1825
Repeals/revokes	Dowress, etc. Act 1495; Entailed Estates Act 1826
Amended by	Statute Law Revision Act 1874; Statute Law Revision Act 1875; Statute Law Revision Act 1890; Law of Property Act 1922; Law of Property (Amendment) Act 1924; Law of Property Act 1925; Administration of Estates Act 1925; Law Reform (Married Women and Tortfeasors) Act 1935; Criminal Law Act 1967; Statute Law (Repeals) Act 1969; Statute Law (Repeals) Act 1976; Trusts of Land and Appointment of Trustees Act 1996; Mental Capacity Act 2005
Relates to	Fines and Recoveries (Ireland) Act 1834

Status: Amended

Text of statute as originally enacted

Revised text of statute as amended

Text of the Fines and Recoveries Act 1833 as in force today (including any amendments) within the United Kingdom, from legislation.gov.uk.

The Fines and Recoveries Act 1833 (3 & 4 Will. 4. c. 74) is an act of the Parliament of the United Kingdom. It abolished the two species of property conveyance known as fines of lands (or final concords) and common recoveries.

== Provisions ==
Section 27 of the act repealed the Dowress, etc. Act 1495 (11 Hen. 7. c. 20), except as to lands compromised in any settlement before the passing of the act.

Section 60 of the act repealed from 1 January 1733 so much of the Bankruptcy Act 1825 (6 Geo. 4. c. 16) "as empowers the Commissioners named in any Commission of Bankrupt issued against a Tenant in Tail to make Sale of any Lands, Tenements, and Hereditaments, situate either in England or Ireland, whereof such Bankrupt shall be seised of any Estate Tail in Possession, Reversion, or Remainder, and whereof no Reversion or Remainder is in the Crown, the Gift or Provision of the Crown".

Section 60 of the act repealed from 1 January 1733 the Entailed Estates Act 1826 (7 Geo. 4. c. 45), providing that this would not revive the Entailed Estates Act 1800 (39 & 40 Geo. 3. c. 56).

== Subsequent developments ==
The Fines and Recoveries (Ireland) Act 1834 (4 & 5 Will. 4. c. 92) made similar provisions to the act for Ireland.

The act is declared in force in South Australia by the Estates Tail Act 1881.

In section 27 of the act, the words "no woman in respect of her dower and" were repealed by section 56 of, and part I of the second schedule to, the Administration of Estates Act 1925 (15 & 16 Geo. 5. c. 23), which came into force on 1 January 1926.

In section 33 of the act, the words from "or if any person, protector of a settlement," to "continuance of such estate", and the word "other", were repealed by section 10(2) of, and part I of schedule 3 to, the Criminal Law Act 1967, which came into force on 1 January 1968.

The following provisions were repealed by section 1 of, and part III of the schedule to, the Statute Law (Repeals) Act 1969, which came into force on 1 January 1970.

- In section 27 the words from " (except " to " thirty-three) ".
- In section 40 the words from " and if " onwards. In section 58 the words " except so far as the same may be varied by the clause next hereinafter contained."
- Section 71 from " and all the previous clauses in this Act" onwards.
- In section 72 the words from " but every deed to be executed " to " Ireland ", where next occurring.
- Sections 77 and 78.
- Section 91.

In section 67 of the act, including that section as applied by any other act, the words from "and in case any action of trespass" to "special matter in evidence" were repealed by section 1(1) of, and part I of schedule 1 to, the Statute Law (Repeals) Act 1976, which came into force on 27 May 1976.
