= Bankruptcy Act 1967 =

Parliament of Malaysia
- Long title: An Act relating to the law of bankruptcy.
- Citation: Act 360
- Territorial extent: Throughout Malaysia
- Passed by: Dewan Rakyat
- Passed: 26 August 1967
- Enacted: 1967 (Act 55 of 1967); Revised: 1988 (Act 360 w.e.f. 31 December 1988)
- Passed by: Dewan Negara
- Passed: 29 August 1967
- Effective: 30 September 1967

Legislative history

First chamber: Dewan Rakyat
- Bill title: Bankruptcy Bill 1967
- Introduced by: Abdul Rahman Ya'kub, Minister of Lands and Mines and Minister of Justice
- First reading: 21 August 1967
- Second reading: 26 August 1967
- Third reading: 26 August 1967

Second chamber: Dewan Negara
- Bill title: Bankruptcy Bill 1967
- Member(s) in charge: Athi Nahappan, Senator
- First reading: 28 August 1967
- Second reading: 29 August 1967
- Third reading: 29 August 1967

Amended by
- Malaysia Currency (Ringgit) Act 1975 [Act 160] Bankruptcy (Amendment) Act 1976 [Act A364] Subordinate Courts (Amendment) Act 1987 [Act A671] Bankruptcy (Amendment) Act 1988 [Act A710] Bankruptcy (Amendment) Act 1992 [Act A827] Bankruptcy (Amendment) Act 1998 [Act A1035] Bankruptcy (Amendment) Act 2003 [Act A1197]

Related legislation
- Bankruptcy Ordinance of Sarawak [Sarawak Cap. 46] Insolvency Ordinance of Sabah [Sabah Cap. 62]
- Status: In force

The Bankruptcy Act 1967 (Malay: Akta Kebankrapan 1967), is a Malaysian laws which enacted relating to the law of bankruptcy.

== Structure ==
The Bankruptcy Act 1967, in its current form (1 January 2006), consists of 8 Parts containing 139 sections and 3 schedules (including 7 amendments).

- Preliminary
  - Interpretation
- Part I: Proceedings from Act of Bankruptcy to Discharge
  - Acts of Bankruptcy
  - Receiving Order
  - Proceedings consequent on Receiving Order
  - Public Examination of Debtor
  - Composition or Scheme of Arrangement
  - Adjudication of Bankruptcy
  - Control over Person and Property of Debtor
  - Discharge of Bankrupt
- Part II: Disqualification and Disabilities of Bankrupt
  - Undischarged Bankrupt
- Part III: Administration of Property
  - Proof of Debts
  - Property Available for Payment of Debts
  - Effect of Bankruptcy on Antecedent Transactions
  - Realization of Property
  - Distribution of Property
- Part IV: Director General of Insolvency
  - Appointment
  - Duties
  - Costs
  - Receipts, Payments, Accounts, Audit
  - Release
  - Official Name
  - Vacation of Office on Insolvency
  - Additional Powers
  - Control
- Part V: Constitution, Procedure and Powers of Court
  - Jurisdiction
  - Appeals
  - Procedure
  - Annulment of Adjudication
- Part VI: Small Bankruptcies
- Part VII: Fraudulent Debtors and Creditors
- Part VIII: Supplemental Provisions
  - Application of Act
  - General Rules
  - Fees
  - Evidence
  - Notices
  - Formal Defects
  - Stamp Duty
  - Corporations, Firms and Mentally Disordered Persons
  - Unclaimed Funds or Dividends
  - Debtor’s Books
  - Repeals and Special Provisions
- Schedules

== See also ==
- Bankruptcy Act
