= Statute of Bankrupts =

Act of the Parliament of England

- Act of Parliament
- Parliament of England
- Long title: An Acte againste suche persones as doo make Bankrupte
- Citation: 34 & 35 Hen. 8. c. 4
- Territorial extent: England and Wales

Dates
- Royal assent: 12 May 1543
- Commencement: 3 November 1542 (Note: Start of session.)
- Repealed: 1 September 1825
Other legislation
Amended by	Bankruptcy (England) Act 1824
Repealed by	Bankruptcy Act 1825
Relates to	Bankrupts Act 1571

Status: Repealed

Text of statute as originally enacted

The Statute of Bankrupts or Bankruptcy Act 1542 (34 & 35 Hen. 8. c. 4), was an act of the Parliament of England in 1542. It was the first statute under English law dealing with bankruptcy or insolvency.

The act contained an extremely long preamble which denounced debtors acting in fraud of their creditors, directed that the bodies of the offenders and all of their assets be taken by the requisite authorities and the assets be sold to pay their creditors "a portion, rate and rate alike, according to the quantity of their debts". Thereby the first bankruptcy statute also imported into English law for the first time the pari passu principle of distribution on insolvency.

These principles would later be heavily underscored by the House of Lords in the cases of National Westminster Bank Ltd v Halesowen Presswork & Assemblies Ltd [1972] AC 785 and British Eagle International Airlines Ltd v Compagnie Nationale Air France [1975] 1 WLR 758.

== Preamble ==
The preamble to the act is as follows:

Where divers and sundry persons craftily obtaining into their hands great substance of other men’s goods do suddenly flee to parts unknown or keep their houses, not minding to pay or restore to any their creditors their debts and duties, but at their own will and pleasure consume the substance obtained by credit of other men, for their own pleasure and delicate living, against all reason, equity and good conscience ...the Lord Chancellor ... shall have power and authority by virtue of this Act to take ... imprisonment of their bodies or otherwise, as also with their [real and personal property however held] and to make sale of said [real and personal property however held] for true satisfaction and payment of the said creditors, that is to say; to every of the said creditors a portion, rate and rate like, according to the quantity of their debt.

== Subsequent developments ==
The whole act was repealed by section 1 of the Bankruptcy Act 1825 (6 Geo. 4. c. 16), which came into force on 1 September 1825.

== See also ==
- Bankruptcy Act
- Debtors' prison
