= Bankruptcy Act of 1898 =

American federal law addressing bankruptcy protection

- Other short titles: National Bankruptcy Act of 1898; Nelson Act; Nelson Bankruptcy Act of 1898
- Long title: An Act to establish a uniform system of bankruptcy throughout the United States.
- Enacted by: the 55th United States Congress
- Effective: July 1, 1898

Citations
- Public law: Pub. L. 55–541
- Statutes at Large: 30 Stat. 544

Legislative history
- Introduced in the Senate as S. 1035 by Knute Nelson (R-MN); Passed the House on February 19, 1898 (158-125); Reported by the joint conference committee on June 24, 1898; agreed to by the Senate on June 24, 1898 (43-13) and by the House on June 28, 1898 (134-53); Signed into law by President William McKinley on July 1, 1898

The Bankruptcy Act of 1898 ("Nelson Act", July 1, 1898, ch. 541, 30 Stat. 544) was the first United States Act of Congress involving bankruptcy to give companies an option of being protected from creditors. Previous attempts at federal bankruptcy laws had lasted, at most, a few years.

Its popular name is a homage to the role of Senator Knute Nelson in its composition.

It was significantly amended by the Bankruptcy Act of 1938 and was superseded by the Bankruptcy Act of 1978.

== See also ==
- Bankruptcy Act
- History of bankruptcy law in the United States
