= Commissioner of Bankruptcy (England and Wales) =

Official appointed to administer the estate of a bankrupt

A Commissioner of Bankruptcy (England and Wales) was, from 1571 to 1883, an official appointed (initially by commission of the Lord Chancellor) to administer the estate of a bankrupt with full power to dispose of all his lands and tenements. Bankrupts were defined as insolvent persons engaged in trade or business and kept distinct from other insolvents until 1861. The proceedings of that administration were the distribution of the property of an insolvent person to that person's creditors in proportion to the debts.

== History ==
The first formal regulation of the distribution of the property of an insolvent person to that person's creditors was by the Statute of Bankrupts 1542. Administration was delegated to certain members of the Privy Council and the chief justices of King's Bench and Common Pleas.

== Commissioners of Bankrupts 1571–1883 ==
=== 1571–1831 ===
Bankrupts Act 1571
- Act of Parliament
- Parliament of England
- Long title: An Act touching Orders for Bankrupts.
- Citation: 13 Eliz. 1. c. 7
- Territorial extent: England and Wales

Dates
- Royal assent: 29 May 1571
- Commencement: 2 April 1571 (Note: Start of session.)
- Repealed: 1 September 1825
Other legislation
Amended by	Bankruptcy (England) Act 1824
Repealed by	Bankruptcy Act 1825
Relates to	Statute of Bankrupts

Status: Repealed

Text of statute as originally enacted

Under the Bankrupts Act 1571 (13 Eliz. 1. c. 7) administration was passed to commissioners of bankrupts appointed by and superintended by the Lord Chancellor, or Lord Keeper. Their Office of the Commissioners of Bankrupts was attached to the Court of Chancery.

=== Court of Bankruptcy 1831–1883 ===
A separate Court of Bankruptcy was established in 1831 under the Bankruptcy Court (England) Act 1831 to replace those commissioners. The court consisted of four judges and only six commissioners. A decade later district courts were established. People vesting all property in an official assignee could obtain protection from either courts. In 1861 the Court of Bankruptcy was confined to London and was afterwards known as the London Court of Bankruptcy.

It was merged with the High Court by the Bankruptcy Act 1883.

=== Court for Relief of Insolvent Debtors 1842–1861 ===
From 1842 under the Bankruptcy Act 1842 persons not being a trader or being a trader and owing less than £300 could obtain the protection of the official assignee from this court in London or one of the district courts of bankruptcy. Jurisdiction of this court passed to the Court of Bankruptcy in 1861.

== High Court of Justice in Bankruptcy 1883— ==
The Bankruptcy Act 1883 transferred jurisdiction to the High Court and County Courts.

== See also ==
- Bankruptcy in the United Kingdom
- United Kingdom insolvency law

== Sources ==
- Covering note. Administrative / biographical background of The Records of the Office of the Commissioners of Bankrupts etc.
