= Letters Patent Act 1571 =

Act of the Parliament of England

Letters Patent Act 1571 (Note: The citation of this act by this short title was authorised by section 5 of, and the second schedule to, the Statute Law Revision Act 1948. Due to the repeal of those provisions, it is now authorised by section 19(2) of the Interpretation Act 1978.)
- Act of Parliament
- Parliament of England
- Long title: An Acte that the Constathes and Exemplifications of Letters Patentes shalbe as good and avayleable as the Letters Patentes themselves. (Note: These words are printed against this act in the second column of the second schedule to the Statute Law Revision Act 1948, which is headed "Title".)
- Citation: 13 Eliz. 1. c. 6
- Territorial extent: England and Wales

Dates
- Royal assent: 29 May 1571
- Commencement: 2 April 1571 (Note: Start of session.)
Other legislation
Amended by	Statute Law Revision Act 1948

Status: Amended

Text of statute as originally enacted

Revised text of statute as amended

Text of the Letters Patent Act 1571 as in force today (including any amendments) within the United Kingdom, from legislation.gov.uk.

The Letters Patent Act 1571 (13 Eliz. 1. c. 6) is an act of the Parliament of England.

The act was still partly in force in England and Wales at the end of 2010.
