= Continuance, etc. of Laws Act 1597 =

Act of the Parliament of England

- Act of Parliament
- Parliament of England
- Long title: An Acte for the revyvinge contynewance explancion perfectinge and repealing of divers Statutes.
- Citation: 39 Eliz. 1. c. 18
- Territorial extent: England and Wales

Dates
- Royal assent: 9 February 1598
- Commencement: 24 October 1597 (Note: Start of session.)
- Repealed: 28 July 1863

Other legislation
- Amends: Maintenance of the Navy Act 1562; See § Revived and continued enactments
- Repeals/revokes: See § Repealed enactments
- Repealed by: Statute Law Revision Act 1863
- Relates to: See Expiring laws continuance acts

Status: Repealed

Text of statute as originally enacted

The Continuance, etc. of Laws Act 1597 (39 Eliz. 1. c. 18) was an act of the Parliament of England that revived, continued and repealed various older acts.

== Provisions ==
=== Revived and continued enactments ===
Section 1 of the act made the Usury Act 1571 (13 Eliz. 1. c. 8), Fraudulent Conveyances Act 1584 (27 Eliz. 1. c. 4) and Juries (No. 2) Act 1584 (27 Eliz. 1. c. 7) perpetual.

Section 2 of the act continued the Ecclesiastical Leases Act 1572 (14 Eliz. 1. c. 11) and the Continuance, etc. of Laws Act 1584 (27 Eliz. 1. c. 11), except for provisions relating to the Importation Act 1562 (5 Eliz. 1. c. 7), the Maintenance of the Navy Act 1562 (5 Eliz. 1. c. 5), the Tillage Act 1562 (5 Eliz. 1. c. 2), the Caps Act 1571 (13 Eliz. 1. c. 19), the Vagabonds Act 1572 (14 Eliz. 1. c. 5), the Poor Act 1575 (18 Eliz. 1. c. 3), the Dover Harbour Act 1580 (23 Eliz. 1. c. 6) and the Disabled Soldiers Act 1592 (35 Eliz. 1. c. 4).

Section 3 of the act continued the Maintenance of the Navy Act 1562 (5 Eliz. 1. c. 5), the Dover Harbour Act 1580 (23 Eliz. 1. c. 6) and the Road Repairs (Oxford) Act 1575 (18 Eliz. 1. c. 20), as amended by the Continuance, etc. of Laws Act 1592 (35 Eliz. 1. c. 7), until the end of the next session of parliament.

Section 4 of the act continued the Importation Act 1562 (5 Eliz. 1. c. 7) until the end of the next session of parliament.

Section 6 of the act revived and continued the Vagabonds Act 1572 (14 Eliz. 1. c. 5) and the Poor Act 1575 (18 Eliz. 1. c. 3) until the end of the next session of parliament.

Section 7 of the act continued the Disabled Soldiers Act 1592 (35 Eliz. 1. c. 4) until the end of the next session of parliament.

=== Repealed enactments ===
Section 5 of the act repealed the Caps Act 1571 (13 Eliz. 1. c. 19).

== Subsequent developments ==
The whole act was repealed by section 1 of, and the schedule to, the Statute Law Revision Act 1863 (26 & 27 Vict. c. 125), which came into force on 28 July 1863.
