= Attainders of Earl of Westmorland and others Act 1571 =

Act of the Parliament of England

- Act of Parliament
- Parliament of England
- Long title: An Acte for the confirmation of Thattaynders of Charles Earle of Westmerlande Thomas Earle of Northumberland and others.
- Citation: 13 Eliz. 1. c. 16
- Territorial extent: England and Wales

Dates
- Royal assent: 29 May 1571
- Commencement: 2 April 1571 (Note: Start of session.)
- Repealed: 16 June 1977
Other legislation
Repealed by	Statute Law (Repeals) Act 1977

Status: Repealed

Text of statute as originally enacted

The Attainders of Earl of Westmorland and others Act 1571(13 Eliz. 1. c. 16) was an act of the Parliament of England which confirmed the attainder against Charles Neville, 6th Earl of Westmorland and 57 others for their part in the Rising of the North, a plot against Queen Elizabeth I.

== Subsequent developments ==
The whole act was repealed by section 1(1) of, and part IV of schedule 1 to, the Statute Law (Repeals) Act 1977, which came into force on 16 June 1977.
