= Bankruptcy (Scotland) Act 1856 =

Act of the Parliament of the United Kingdom

Bankruptcy (Scotland) Act 1856 (Note: Section 1.)
- Act of Parliament
- Parliament of the United Kingdom
- Long title: An Act to consolidate and amend the Laws relating to Bankruptcy in Scotland.
- Citation: 19 & 20 Vict. c. 79
- Territorial extent: Scotland (Note: Preamble.)

Dates
- Royal assent: 29 July 1856
- Commencement: 1 November 1856
- Repealed: 1 January 1914
Other legislation
| Repeals/revokes | See § Repealed enactments |
| Repealed by | Bankruptcy (Scotland) Act 1913 |

Status: Repealed

Text of statute as originally enacted

The Bankruptcy (Scotland) Act 1856 (19 & 20 Vict. c. 79) was an act of the Parliament of the United Kingdom that consolidated enactments related to bankruptcy in Scotland.

== Provisions ==
=== Repealed enactments ===
Section 2 of the act repealed 3 enactments, listed in that section.

| Citation | Short title | Description | Extent of repeal |
|---|---|---|---|
| 54 Geo. 3 c. 137 | Payment of Creditors (Scotland) Act 1814 | An Act for rendering the Payment of Creditors more equal and expeditious in Scotland. | The whole act. |
| 2 & 3 Vict. c. 41 | Bankruptcy (Scotland) Act 1839 | An Act for regulating the Sequestration of the Estates of Bankrupts in Scotland. | The whole act. |
| 16 & 17 Vict. c. 53 | Bankruptcy (Scotland) Act 1853 | An Act to amend the Laws relating to Bankruptcy in Scotland. | The whole act. |

== Subsequent developments ==
The whole act was repealed by section 191(1) of, and the first schedule to, the Bankruptcy (Scotland) Act 1913 (3 & 4 Geo. 5 c. 20), which came into force on 1 January 1914.
