= Treasons Act 1571 =

Act of the Parliament of England

- Act of Parliament
- Parliament of England
- Long title: An Acte whereby certayne Offences be made Treason.
- Citation: 13 Eliz. 1. c. 1
- Territorial extent: England and Wales

Dates
- Royal assent: 29 May 1571
- Commencement: 2 April 1571 (Note: Start of session.)
- Repealed: 28 July 1863
Other legislation
| Amends | Treasons Act 1534; Treason Act 1547 |
| Repealed by | Statute Law Revision Act 1863 |

Status: Repealed

Text of statute as originally enacted

The Treasons Act 1571 (13 Eliz. 1. c. 1) was an act of the Parliament of England during the reign of Queen Elizabeth I. It restored the provisions of the Treasons Act 1534 (26 Hen. 8. c. 13), which had been passed by Parliament during the reign of her father, King Henry VIII, and then repealed by the Treason Act 1547 (1 Edw. 6. c. 12) at the beginning of the reign of her half-brother, King Edward VI.

The act was notable for the provision that two witnesses were needed to prove a charge of treason, a rule which still exists today in the United States Constitution.

== The act ==
It became high treason to intend bodily harm to the Queen, or to levy war against her, or incite others to levy war against her, or to say that she ought not to enjoy the Crown, or publish in writing that she is a heretic, tyrant or usurper, or to claim a right to the Crown or usurp it during the Queen's life, or to assert that somebody else has the right of succession to the throne, or to say that the laws enacted by Parliament do not govern the succession to the throne.

== Subsequent developments ==
The whole act was repealed by section 1 of, and the schedule to, the Statute Law Revision Act 1863 (26 & 27 Vict. c. 125), which came into force on 28 July 1863.

However until 1967 it remained treason under the Succession to the Crown Act 1707 (6 Ann. c. 41) to say that Parliament could not control the succession to the Crown.

Some of the wording of section 5 of the act has drawn attention for its description of the legal line of succession. In the twenty-first century, academic scholarship and proponents of the Oxfordian theory of Shakespeare authorship noted the departure of the terms "heirs of the body" to the introduction of the phrase "natural issue" to refer to the line of succession, or Queen's heir to the throne:

that any one particular person, whosoever it be, is or ought to be the right heir and successor to the Queen's Majesty that now is (whom God long preserve) except the same be the natural issue of her Majesty's body

Proponents contend this wording meant that any illegitimate child, or "natural issue", born to Queen Elizabeth I, would then be legal successor to the monarchy. As of 2016, scholarship continues to debate the implications of the change in the legal language, but agree its inclusion in the act was meant to prevent a crisis of succession.

== See also ==
- High treason in the United Kingdom
- Treason Act
- Succession to the British throne
- Oxfordian theory of Shakespeare authorship
