= Monmouth cap =

Knitted, round cap associated with Monmouth, Wales

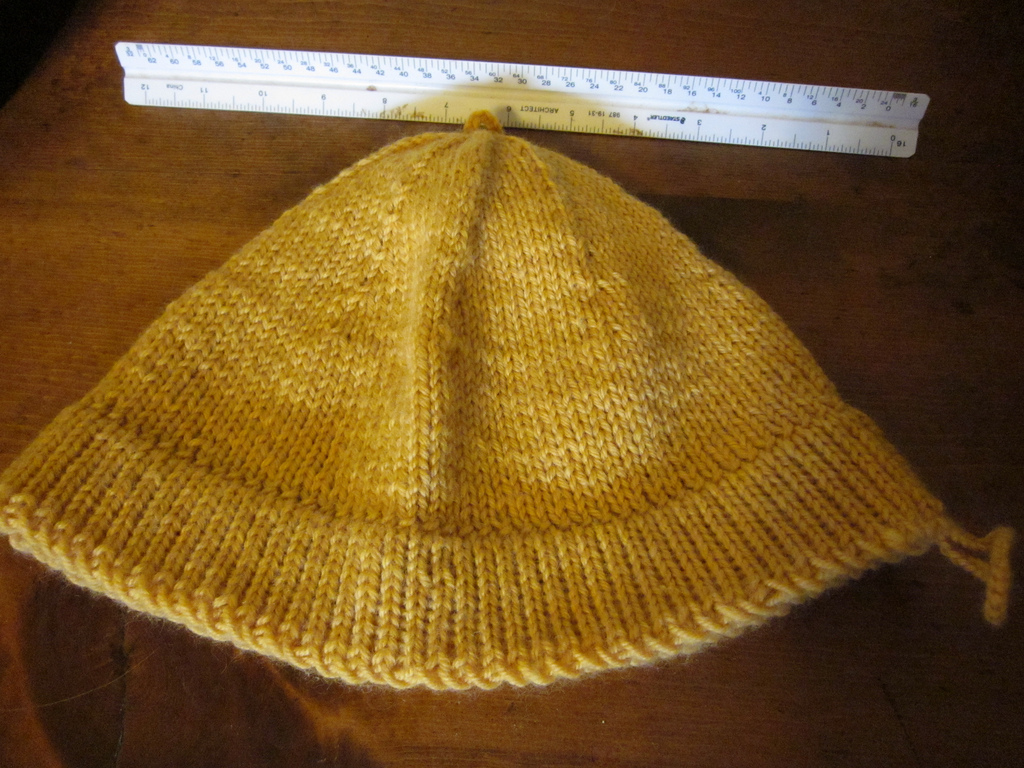
- An example of a Monmouth cap
- Type: Hat
- Material: Wool
- Place of origin: Monmouth, Wales

The Monmouth cap (Welsh: Cap Trefynwy) was an item of woollen headgear fashionable between the 15th and 18th centuries, and associated with the town of Monmouth in South East Wales. The knitted round caps were used by both soldiers and sailors, and they were widely exported.

== History ==
In the early 14th century, the area immediately north of Monmouth, known as Archenfield, became known for the high quality of its wool, produced from Ryeland sheep. The wool was ideal for the production of high quality felt, and the location of Monmouth, on the River Wye some 18 miles (29 km) inland from the Severn estuary, allowed the produce of the area ready access to wider markets. The industry of cap manufacture by hand knitters in and around Monmouth was well established by the 15th century, when court records show Capper as a common surname in the town. The cappers or knitters, generally men, were attached to the Weaver's Guild and may have been governed by a Council of Master Craftsmen. The trade is thought to have flourished particularly in the Overmonnow area, known at one time as "Cappers' town". However, antiquarian sources state that much of the trade moved from Monmouth to Bewdley in Worcestershire at some point, following an outbreak of plague at Monmouth.

Hats and Caps Act 1488
- Act of Parliament
- Parliament of England
- Long title: Hattes & Cappes.
- Citation: 4 Hen. 7. c. 9
- Territorial extent: England and Wales; Ireland

Dates
- Royal assent: 27 February 1490
- Commencement: 21 December 1489 (Note: Feast of Saint Thomas the Apostle.)
- Repealed: 19 February 1624
Other legislation
Repealed by	Continuance, etc. of Laws Act 1623
Relates to	Caps Act 1571

Status: Repealed

Text of statute as originally enacted

Caps Act 1571
- Act of Parliament
- Parliament of England
- Long title: An Act for the making of Caps.
- Citation: 13 Eliz. 1. c. 19
- Territorial extent: England and Wales

Dates
- Royal assent: 29 May 1571
- Commencement: 2 April 1571 (Note: Start of session.)
- Repealed: 24 October 1597
Other legislation
Amended by	Continuance, etc. of Laws Act 1592
Repealed by	Continuance, etc. of Laws Act 1597
Relates to	Hats and Caps Act 1488

Status: Repealed

Text of statute as originally enacted

Worn by upper and lower classes in England, the headgear reached the height of its popularity in the 15th and 16th centuries. Monmouth caps were essential equipment for soldiers, sailors and labourers of the period, so familiar and widely used that they were taken for granted. According to one 19th century encyclopedia, they were at one time "worn by a large portion of the population of England and Wales." The Hats and Caps Act 1488 (4 Hen. 7. c. 9) forbade, on penalty of a fine, the wearing of foreign-made caps in England and Wales. The Caps Act 1571 (13 Eliz. 1. c. 19), during the reign of Elizabeth I, stated that every person above the age of six years (excepting "Maids, ladies, gentlewomen, noble personages, and every Lord, knight and gentleman of twenty marks land") residing in any of the cities, towns, villages or hamlets of England, must wear, on Sundays and holidays (except when travelling), "a cap of wool, thicked and dressed in England, made within this realm, and only dressed and finished by some of the trade of cappers, upon pain to forfeit for every day of not wearing 3s. 4d." This legislation was intended to protect domestic production, as caps were becoming unfashionable and were being challenged by new forms of imported headgear. The act was repealed in 1597 by the Continuance, etc. of Laws Act 1597 (39 Eliz. 1. c. 18) as unworkable.

The earliest surviving reference to a "Monmouth Cappe" dates from 1576, in a letter from Lord Gilbert Talbot of Goodrich Castle to his father, the Earl of Shrewsbury, accompanying a new year's gift of a cap. By that time, the caps were popular enough to have their own name, and considered to be suitable gifts between noblemen. King Henry V was born in Monmouth, and there is a reference to such a cap in Shakespeare's play, Henry V, written around 1599:

Fluellen: "Your majesty says very true: if your majestie is remembered of it, the Welshmen did good service in a garden where leeks did grow, wearing leeks in their Monmouth caps; which, your majesty knows, to this hour is an honourable badge of the service; and I do believe your majesty takes no scorn to wear the leek upon Saint Davy's day.

In the 1620s, the sponsors of the Massachusetts Bay Colony ordered Monmouth caps - described as "thick, warm, fulled by hand- and foot- beating and much favored by seamen" - as part of the outfitting of the settlers. Daniel Defoe, in his 1712 Tour through the Whole Island of Great Britain, described Monmouth caps as being worn predominantly by Dutch seamen. Peter the Great of Russia wore one when working for the East India Company in 1697; it is preserved in the Hermitage Museum in Saint Petersburg.

As the caps were increasingly made outside Monmouthshire, the term "Monmouth cap" came to mean the style of cap, rather than any location of manufacture. Areas, such as Coventry, produced other varieties of cap, and similar caps were known simply as knitted caps, Kilmarnock cauls, Scotch bonnets, or watch caps.

== Design and production ==
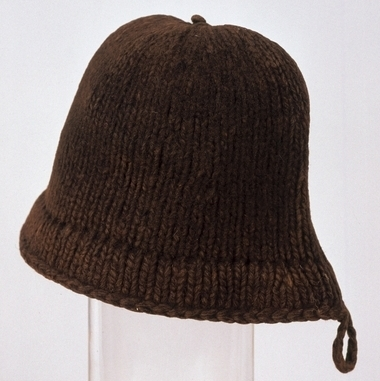
The only known surviving example of a 16th-century Monmouth cap, in Monmouth Museum

The earliest surviving example is held by Monmouth Museum and was knitted from coarse two ply wool. The cap was made by casting on at the lower edge and knitting in the round towards the top. The crown consists of a classic rounded top, with the last remaining stitches cast off. The yarn tail was wrapped around just below the cast off stitches to gather them, leaving the little lump commonly, but inexactly, referred to as a button. The doubled brim was formed by picking up stitches inside the body of the cap, and worked down to the original cast on. The cast on loops were picked up, and a three needle bindoff worked to finish and join the inner brim to the outer cap, ending with a little loop.

Each hat was made weatherproof by felting, a process which reduced its size. The distance from the centre to the hem in this example varies between 5 inches (130 mm) and 6 inches (150 mm).

Thousands of Monmouth caps were made, but their relatively low cost, and the ease with which the knitting could unravel, means that few remain.

== Reproduction ==
Similar caps are now produced for historical re-enactment organisations.

Patterns that attempt a stitch for stitch reproduction sometimes result in a cap that is slightly too narrow, after felting, due to the different felting characteristics of modern knitting yarn.

== Legacy ==
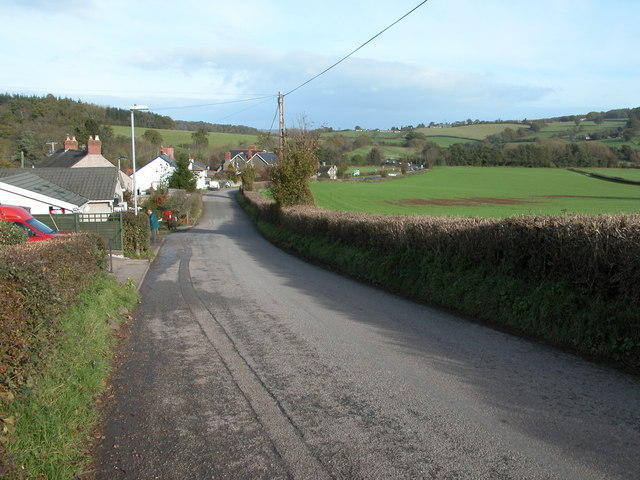
The small area known as "Monmouth Cap"

The Monmouth Cap Inn was a coaching inn located on the main road between Abergavenny and Hereford, just north of Llangua on the River Monnow, Wales. The river marked the boundary between Herefordshire and Monmouthshire. The inn was the property of the Kentchurch estate, and adjoined a ruined priory. Although the inn has closed, the name Monmouth Cap remains in use for the locality.

== See also ==
- List of hat styles
- Blue bonnet (hat)
- Tuque
