= Bankruptcy (Scotland) Act 1913 =

Act of the Parliament of the United Kingdom

Bankruptcy (Scotland) Act 1913 (Note: Section 1.)
- Act of Parliament
- Parliament of the United Kingdom
- Long title: An Act to consolidate and amend the Laws relating to Bankruptcy in Scotland.
- Citation: 3 & 4 Geo. 5 c. 20
- Territorial extent: Scotland (Note: Long title.)

Dates
- Royal assent: 15 August 1913
- Commencement: 1 January 1914 (Note: Section 192.)
Other legislation
Amends	See § Repealed enactments
Repeals/revokes	See § Repealed enactments
Amended by	Local Government (Scotland) Act 1947; Law Reform (Miscellaneous Provisions) (Scotland) Act 1980; Bankruptcy (Scotland) Act 1985

Status: Partially repealed

Text of statute as originally enacted

The Bankruptcy (Scotland) Act 1913 (3 & 4 Geo. 5 c. 20) is an act of the Parliament of the United Kingdom that consolidated enactments related to bankruptcy in Scotland.

== Provisions ==
=== Repealed enactments ===
Section 191(1) of the act repealed 13 enactments, listed in the schedule I to the act.

Citation	Short title	Extent of repeal
6 & 7 Will. 3. c. 56	Cessio (Scotland) Act 1836	The whole act.
19 & 20 Vict. c. 79	Bankruptcy (Scotland) Act 1856	The whole act.
20 & 21 Vict. c. 19	Bankruptcy and Real Securities (Scotland) Act 1857	The whole act.
23 & 24 Vict. c. 33	Bankruptcy (Scotland) Amendment Act 1860	The whole act.
38 & 39 Vict. c. 26	Bankruptcy (Scotland) Act 1875	The whole act.
39 & 40 Vict. c. 70	Sheriff Courts (Scotland) Act 1876	Section 26.
42 & 43 Vict. c. 40	Conveyancing (Scotland) Act 1874, Amendment Act 1879	The whole act.
43 & 44 Vict. c. 34	Debtors (Scotland) Act 1880	The whole act except section 4.
44 & 45 Vict. c. 22	Bankruptcy and Cessio (Scotland) Act 1881	The whole act.
47 & 48 Vict. c. 16	Bankruptcy, Frauds and Disabilities (Scotland) Act 1884	The whole act.
50 & 51 Vict. c. 69	Conveyancing (Scotland) Acts, 1874 and 1879, Amendment Act 1887	Section 2.
52 & 53 Vict. c. 39	Judicial Factors (Scotland) Act 1889	Section 17.
58 & 59 Vict. c. 19	Court of Session Consignations (Scotland) Act 1895	Sections 10 and 11. Section 16, so far as relating to any sums received by the accountant or deposited in bank in terms of this act.

== Subsequent developments ==
The whole act, except section 118, was repealed by section 75(2) of, and schedule 8 to, the Bankruptcy (Scotland) Act 1985, which came into force on 1 April 1986.
