= Bankruptcy Act 1825 =

Act of the Parliament of the United Kingdom

- Act of Parliament
- Parliament of the United Kingdom
- Long title: An Act to amend the Laws relating to Bankrupts.
- Citation: 6 Geo. 4. c. 16
- Introduced by: Thomas Courtenay MP (Commons)
- Territorial extent: England and Wales (Note: Section 135.)

Dates
- Royal assent: 2 May 1825
- Commencement: 1 September 1825, except that the repeal of the Bankruptcy (England) Act 1824 (5 Geo. 4. c. 98), and of all enactments therein contained relating to certificates of conformity, took effect on 2 May 1825. (Note: Section 136.)
- Repealed: 11 October 1849
Other legislation
| Amends | See § Repealed enactments |
| Repeals/revokes | See § Repealed enactments |
| Amended by | Fines and Recoveries Act 1833 |
| Repealed by | Bankrupt Law Consolidation Act 1849 |

Status: Repealed

Text of statute as originally enacted

The Bankruptcy Act 1825 (6 Geo. 4. c. 16), also known as the Bankrupt Act, the Bankrupts Act 1825 or the Bankrupts England Act 1825, was an act of the Parliament of the United Kingdom.

The act allowed people to start proceedings for their own bankruptcy. Before this, only creditors could start the proceedings.

== Passage ==
Leave to bring in the Bankrupt Laws Bill to the House of Commons was granted to Thomas Courtenay MP and the solicitor general, Sir Charles Wetherell, MP on 25 March 1825. The bill had its first reading in the House of Commons on 25 March 1825, presented by Thomas Courtenay MP. The bill had its second reading in the House of Commons on 28 March 1825 and was committed to a committee of the whole house, which met and reported on 30 March 1825, with amendments. The amended bill was considered on 15 April 1825 and was re-committed to a committee of the whole house, which met on 15 April 1825 and reported on 22 April 1825, with amendments. The bill and had its third reading in the House of Commons on 25 April 1825 and passed, with amendments.

The bill had its first reading in the House of Lords on X. The bill had its second reading in the House of Lords on X and was committed to a committee of the whole house, which met on X and reported on X, with amendments. The amended bill had its third reading in the House of Lords on X and passed, with amendments.

The amended bill was considered and agreed to by the House of Commons on 29 April 1825.

The bill was granted royal assent on 2 May 1825.

== Provisions ==
=== Repealed enactments ===
Section 1 of the act repealed 21 enactments, listed in that section.

| Citation | Short title | Description | Extent of repeal |
|---|---|---|---|
| 34 & 35 Hen. 8. c. 4 | Bankruptcy Act 1542 | An Act passed in the Thirty fourth and Thirty fifth Years of the Reign of King Henry the Eighth, intituled An Act against such Persons as do make Bankrupt. | The whole act. |
| 13 Eliz. 1. c. 7 | Bankrupts Act 1571 | An Act passed in the Thirteenth Year of the Reign of Queen Elizabeth, intituled An Act touching Orders for Bankrupts. | The whole act. |
| 1 Jac. 1. c. 15 | Bankrupts Act 1603 | An Act passed in the First Year of the Reign of King James the First, intituled An Act for the better Relief of the Creditors against such as shall become Bankrupts. | The whole act. |
| 21 Jac. 1. c. 19 | Bankrupts Act 1623 | An Act passed in the Twenty first Year of the Reign of King James the First, intituled For the further Description of a Bankrupt and Relief of Creditors, against such as shall become Bankrupts, and for inflicting Corporal Punishment upon the Bankrupts in some Special Cases. | The whole act. |
| 13 & 14 Cha. 2. c. 24 | Bankrupts Act 1662 | An Act passed in the Thirteenth and Fourteenth Years of the Reign of King Charles the Second, intituled An Act declaratory concerning Bankrupts. | The whole act. |
| 10 Ann. c. 25 (Note: This is the citation in The Statutes of the Realm.) 10 Ann. c. 15 (Note: This is the citation in The Statutes at Large.) | Bankrupts Act 1711 | An Act passed in the Tenth Year of the Reign of Queen Anne, intituled An Act for repealing a Clause in the above mentioned Statute, passed in the Twenty-first Year of the Reign of King James the First, and for the Explanation of the Laws relating to Bankruptcy in Cases of Partnership. | The whole act. |
| 7 Geo. 1. St. 1. c. 31 | Bankrupts Act 1720 | An Act made in the Seventh Year of the Reign of King George the First, intituled An Act for explaining and making more effectual several Acts concerning Bankrupts. | The whole act. |
| 5 Geo. 2. c. 30 | Bankrupts Act 1731 | An Act passed in the Fifth Year of the Reign of King George the Second, intituled An Act to prevent the committing of Frauds by Bankrupts. | The whole act. |
| 19 Geo. 2. c. 32 | Bankrupts Act 1745 | An Act passed in the Nineteenth Year of the Reign of King George the Second, intituled An Act for amending the Laws relating to Bankrupts. | The whole act. |
| 24 Geo. 2. c. 57 | Continuance of Laws (No.2) Act 1750 | An Act passed in the Twenty fourth Year of the Reign of King George the Second, the Title to which begins with the Words, An Act to continue several Laws therein mentioned for preventing Theft and Rapine, and concludes with the Words, and to make some other Provisions in relation to the signing of Certificates for the Discharge of Bankrupts. | As relates to the Prevention of Frauds by Bankrupts, and to some further Provisions in relation to the signing of Certificates for the Discharge of Bankrupts. I.e., sections 9 and 10. |
| 4 Geo. 3. c. 33 | Bankrupts Act 1763 | An Act passed in the Fourth Year of the Reign of His late Majesty, King George the Third, intituled An Act for preventing Inconveniences arising in Cases of Merchants and such other Persons as are within the Description of the Statutes relating to Bankrupts, being entitled to Privilege of Parliament, and becoming insolvent. | The whole act. |
| 36 Geo. 3. c. 90 | Bank of England Stock Act 1796 | An Act passed in the Thirty sixth Year of the Reign of His late Majesty, intituled An Act for the Relief of Persons equitably entitled to or interested in the several Stocks and Annuities transferrable at the Bank of England. | As relates to Trustees in whose Names Stock shall be standing at the Bank, becoming Bankrupt, and to Bankrupts refusing to transfer Stock standing in their own Right |
| 37 Geo. 3. c. 124 | Bankrupts Act 1797 | An Act passed in the Thirty seventh Year of the Reign of His late Majesty, intituled An Act to make perpetual an Act passed in the Fifth Year of the Reign of His late Majesty, intituled 'An Act to prevent the committing of Frauds by Bankrupts'. | The whole act. |
| 45 Geo. 3. c. 124 | Privilege of Parliament Act 1805 | An Act passed in the Forty fifth Year of the Reign of His late Majesty, intituled An Act to amend an Act passed in the Fourth Year of His present Majesty, intituled 'An Act for preventing Inconveniences arising in Cases of Merchants and such other Persons as are within the Description of the Statutes relating to Bankrupts being entitled to Privilege of Parliament, and becoming insolvent'. | As relates to the Execution of certain Bonds by Traders having Privilege of Parliament, and to the Disobedience by such Traders of Orders for Payment of Money. I.e., section 1. |
| 46 Geo. 3. c. 135 | Bankrupts Act 1806 | An Act passed in the Forty sixth Year of the Reign of His late Majesty, intituled An Act to amend the Laws relating to Bankrupts. | The whole act. |
| 49 Geo. 3. c. 121 | Bankrupts (England and Ireland) Act 1809 | An Act passed in the Forty ninth Year of the Reign of His present Majesty, intituled Act to alter and amend the Laws relating to Bankrupts. | The whole act. (Note: This act was repealed for Ireland by the Statute Law Revision Act 1861 (24 & 25 Vict. c. 101).) |
| 56 Geo. 3. c. 137 | Bankrupts (England) Act 1816 | An Act passed in the Fifty sixth Year of the Reign of His late Majesty, intituled An Act to extend the Provisions of an Act of the First Year of the Reign of King James the First, intituled 'An Act for the better Relief of the Creditors against such as shall become Bankrupts'. | The whole act. (Note: This act was repealed for Ireland by the Statute Law Revision Act 1861 (24 & 25 Vict. c. 101).) |
| 1 Geo. 4. c. 115 | Capital Punishment Act 1820 | An Act passed in the First Year of the Reign of His present Majesty, intituled An Act to repeal so much of the several Acts passed in the Twenty ninth Year of the Reign of Elizabeth, the Fourth of George the First, the Fifth and Eighth of George the Second, as inflicts Capital Punishment on certain Offences therein specified, and to provide more suitable and effectual Punishment for such Offences. | As relates to the Punishment of Frauds committed by Bankrupts |
| 3 Geo. 4. c. 74 | Bankrupts Act 1822 | An Act passed in the Third Year of the Reign of His present Majesty, intituled An Act to amend the Laws relating to Bankrupts under certain Commissions. | The whole act. (Note: This act was repealed for Ireland by the Statute Law Revision Act 1861 (24 & 25 Vict. c. 101).) |
| 3 Geo. 4. c. 81 | Bankrupt Laws (England) Act 1822 | Another Act passed in the Third Year of His present Majesty, intituled An Act to amend the Laws relating to Bankrupts. | The whole act. |
| 5 Geo. 4. c. 98 | Bankruptcy (England) Act 1824 | An Act passed in the Fifth Year of the Reign of His present Majesty, intituled An Act to consolidate and amend the Bankrupt laws. | The whole act. |

The limited territorial extent of the act led to several acts being repealed by later Statute Law Revision Acts, including:

- Statute Law Revision Act 1861 (24 & 25 Vict. c. 101)

== Subsequent developments ==
So much of the act "as empowers the Commissioners named in any Commission of Bankrupt issued against a Tenant in Tail to make Sale of any Lands, Tenements, and Hereditaments, situate either in England or Ireland, whereof such Bankrupt shall be seised of any Estate Tail in Possession, Reversion, or Remainder, and whereof no Reversion or Remainder is in the Crown, the Gift or Provision of the Crown" was repealed by section 60 of the Fines and Recoveries Act 1833 (3 & 4 Will. 4. c. 74), which came into force on 28 August 1833.

The whole act was repealed by section 1 of, and schedule A to, the Bankrupt Law Consolidation Act 1849 (12 & 13 Vict. c. 106), which came into force on 11 October 1849.

The whole act was repealed for the Republic of Ireland by sections 2(1) and 3(1) of, and part 4 of schedule 2 to, the Statute Law Revision Act 2007, which came into force on 8 May 2007.

== See also ==
- UK insolvency law
- UK bankruptcy law
- History of bankruptcy law

== Bibliography ==
- The Statutes of the United Kingdom of Great Britain and Ireland, 6 George IV. 1825. His Majesty's Statute and Law Printers. 1825. p. 46.
- Raithby, John (1826). The Statutes of the United Kingdom of Great Britain and Ireland. Vol. 10. p. 24.
- Sturgeon, Charles (1832). The Bankrupt Act, 6 G. 4. c. 16; and the Bankrupt Court Act, 1 & 2 Wm. 4. c. 56 (2nd ed.). London: Saunders and Benning – via Google Books.
- Sturgeon, Charles (1830). The Bankrupt Act, 6 Geo. IV., Cap. 16, with All the Recent Decisions at Common Law and in Equity, the Orders in Chancery, and Abstracts from Other Statutes Relating to Bankruptcy. London: Saunders and Benning – via Google Books.
- Gregg, Francis (1826). The New Bankrupt Act; 6 Geo. IV. Chap. 16, Fully Explained, with Practical Notes. London: Joseph Butterworth and Son – via Google Books.
- Warrand, A. R. (1826). The New Bankrupt Act, 6 Geo. IV. c. 16. See "Law Books Recently Published by R Pheney" in the supplement to this work, Catalogue of Modern Law Books.
- Impey, W. J. The Bankrupt Act, 6 Geo. IV. Cap. 16.
- Holt, Francis Ludlow (1827). The Bankrupt Laws, as Established by the New Act, 6 Geo. IV. c. 16. Joseph Butterworth and Son London – via Google Books.
- Eden, Robert Henley (1826). A Practical Treatise on the Bankrupt Law: As Amended by the New Act of the 6 Geo. IV. c. 16 (2nd ed.). London: Joseph Butterworth and Son – via Google Books.
