= List of acts of the Parliament of Great Britain from 1720 =

This is a complete list of acts of the Parliament of Great Britain for the year 1720.

For acts passed until 1707, see the list of acts of the Parliament of England and the list of acts of the Parliament of Scotland. See also the list of acts of the Parliament of Ireland.

For acts passed from 1801 onwards, see the list of acts of the Parliament of the United Kingdom. For acts of the devolved parliaments and assemblies in the United Kingdom, see the list of acts of the Scottish Parliament, the list of acts of the Northern Ireland Assembly, and the list of acts and measures of Senedd Cymru; see also the list of acts of the Parliament of Northern Ireland.

The number shown after each act's title is its chapter number. Acts are cited using this number, preceded by the year(s) of the reign during which the relevant parliamentary session was held; thus the Union with Ireland Act 1800 is cited as "39 & 40 Geo. 3. c. 67", meaning the 67th act passed during the session that started in the 39th year of the reign of George III and which finished in the 40th year of that reign. Note that the modern convention is to use Arabic numerals in citations (thus "41 Geo. 3" rather than "41 Geo. III"). Acts of the last session of the Parliament of Great Britain and the first session of the Parliament of the United Kingdom are both cited as "41 Geo. 3".

Acts passed by the Parliament of Great Britain did not have a short title; however, some of these acts have subsequently been given a short title by acts of the Parliament of the United Kingdom (such as the Short Titles Act 1896).

Before the Acts of Parliament (Commencement) Act 1793 came into force on 8 April 1793, acts passed by the Parliament of Great Britain were deemed to have come into effect on the first day of the session in which they were passed. Because of this, the years given in the list below may in fact be the year before a particular act was passed.

== 7 Geo. 1. St. 1 ==
The sixth session of the 5th Parliament of Great Britain, which met from 8 December 1720 until 29 July 1721.

This session was also traditionally cited as 7 Geo. 1, 7 Geo. 1. Stat. 1, 7 Geo. 1. st. 1, 7 G. 1, 7 G. 1. Stat. 1, 7 G. 1. St. 1 or 7 G. 1. st. 1.

=== Public acts ===
Short title	Citation	Royal assent
Long title
South Sea Company Act 1720 (repealed)	7 Geo. 1. St. 1. c. 1	25 January 1721
An Act for restraining the Sub-governor, Deputy-governor, Directors, Treasurer or Cashier, Deputy Cashier, and Accomptant, of the South Sea Company, from going out of this Kingdom, for the Space of One Year, and until the End of the then next Session of Parliament; and for discovering their Estates and Effects, and for preventing the transporting or alienating the same. (Repealed by Statute Law Revision Act 1867 (30 & 31 Vict. c. 59))
South Sea Company (No. 2) Act 1720 (repealed)	7 Geo. 1. St. 1. c. 2	25 January 1721
An Act to disable the present Sub-governor, Deputy-governor, and Directors, of the South Sea Company, at, from, and after, the respective Times for electing a Sub-governor, Deputy-governor, and new Directors, of the said Company, to take, hold, or enjoy, any Office, Place, or Employment, in the said Company, or in the East India Company, or Bank of England; and from voting upon Elections in the said Companies. (Repealed by Statute Law Revision Act 1867 (30 & 31 Vict. c. 59))
Quarantine Act 1720 (repealed)	7 Geo. 1. St. 1. c. 3	25 January 1721
An Act for repealing an Act made in the Ninth Year of the Reign of Her late Majesty Queen Anne, intituled, "An Act to oblige Ships coming from Places infected more effectually to perform their Quarentine;" (Note: Quarantine Act 1710 (9 Ann. c. 2)) and for the better preventing the Plague being brought from Foreign Parts into Great Britain or Ireland, or the Isles of Guernsey, Jersey, Alderney, Sarke, or Man; and to hinder the spreading of Infection. (Determined by Commerce with Certain Countries Act 1721 (8 Geo. 1. c. 8))
Land Tax Act 1720 (repealed)	7 Geo. 1. St. 1. c. 4	11 February 1721
An Act for granting an Aid to His Majesty, by a Land Tax, to be raised in Great Britain, for the Service of the Year One Thousand Seven Hundred Twenty-one. (Repealed by Statute Law Revision Act 1867 (30 & 31 Vict. c. 59))
National Debt Act 1720 (repealed)	7 Geo. 1. St. 1. c. 5	23 March 1721
An Act to enable the South Sea Company to ingraft Part of their Capital Stock and Fund into the Stock and Fund of the Bank of England, and another Part thereof into the Stock and Fund of the East India Company; and for giving further Time for Payments to be made by the said South Sea Company, to the Use of the Publick. (Repealed by Statute Law Revision Act 1870 (33 & 34 Vict. c. 69))
Mutiny Act 1720 (repealed)	7 Geo. 1. St. 1. c. 6	23 March 1721
An Act for punishing Mutiny and Desertion; and for the better Payment of the Army and their Quarters. (Repealed by Statute Law Revision Act 1867 (30 & 31 Vict. c. 59))
Woollen, etc., Manufactures Act 1720 or the Calico Act 1721 (repealed)	7 Geo. 1. St. 1. c. 7	23 March 1721
An Act to preserve and encourage the Woollen and Silk Manufactures of this Kingdom; and for the more effectual employing the Poor, by prohibiting the Use and Wear of all printed, painted, stained, or dyed Callicoes, in Apparel, Household Stuff, Furniture, or otherwise, after the Twenty Fifth Day of December One Thousand Seven Hundred and Twenty-two (except as therein is excepted). (Repealed by Statute Law Revision Act 1867 (30 & 31 Vict. c. 59))
River Kennet, Berkshire Navigation Act 1720	7 Geo. 1. St. 1. c. 8	23 March 1721
An Act for enlarging the Time for making the River Kennet navigable, from Reading to Newbury, in the County of Berks.
Rye Harbour Act 1720 (repealed)	7 Geo. 1. St. 1. c. 9	23 March 1721
An Act for the better Preservation of the Harbour of Rye, in the County of Sussex. (Repealed by Rye Harbour Act 1797 (37 Geo. 3. c. 130))
River Weaver Navigation Act 1720	7 Geo. 1. St. 1. c. 10	23 March 1721
An Act for making the River Weaver navigable, from Frodsham-Bridge to Winsford Bridge, in the County of Chester.
Saint George's Chapel and Street Lighting, Yarmouth Act 1720 or the Saint George's Chapel Act 1720 (repealed)	7 Geo. 1. St. 1. c. 11	23 March 1721
An Act for finishing and adorning the new Chapel, called St. George's Chapel, in Great Yarmouth, in the County of Norfolk; and for enlightening the Streets of the said Town; by a Duty, or Imposition, on Coals, Culm, and Cinders, to be landed and consumed there. (Repealed by Great Yarmouth (Coal Duties and Maintenance of St. George's Chapel) Act 1848 (11 & 12 Vict. c. xxxi))
Silk Manufacturers Act 1720 (repealed)	7 Geo. 1. St. 1. c. 12	7 June 1721
An Act for imploying the Manufacturers; and encouraging the Consumption of Raw Silk and Mohair Yarn, by prohibiting the Wearing of Buttons and Button-holes made of Cloth, Serge, or other Stuffs. (Repealed by Repeal of Obsolete Statutes Act 1856 (19 & 20 Vict. c. 64))
Journeymen Tailors, London Act 1720 (repealed)	7 Geo. 1. St. 1. c. 13	7 June 1721
An Act for regulating the Journeymen Taylors within the Weekly Bills of Mortality. (Repealed by Combinations of Workmen Act 1825 (6 Geo. 4. c. 129) and Conspiracy, and Protection of Property Act 1875 (38 & 39 Vict. c. 86))
Watchet Harbour Act 1720 (repealed)	7 Geo. 1. St. 1. c. 14	7 June 1721
An Act for continuing the Duties granted by several Acts made in the Sixth (Note: Watchet Harbour Act 1707 (6 Ann. c. 69)) and Tenth Years (Note: Minehead Harbour Act 1711 (10 Ann. c. 32)) of Her late Majesty's Reign, for repairing the Harbour and Key of Watchett, in the County of Somerset. (Repealed by Watchet Harbour Act 1857 (20 & 21 Vict. c. cxli))
Rivers Mercy and Irwell Navigation Act 1720 or the Mersey and Irwell Navigation Act 1721	7 Geo. 1. St. 1. c. 15	7 June 1721
An Act for making the Rivers Mercy and Irwell navigable, from Liverpoole to Manchester, in the County Palatine of Lancaster.
Bridlington Piers Act 1720 (repealed)	7 Geo. 1. St. 1. c. 16	7 June 1721
An Act for the better preserving, and keeping in Repair, the Piers of the Town and Port of Whitby, in the County of York; and for explaining and making more effectual the several Acts passed for lengthening and repairing the Piers of Bridlington, alias Burlington, in the said County. (Repealed by Whitby Piers and Harbour Act 1827 (7 & 8 Geo. 4. c. lxxviii) and Bridlington Piers and Harbour Act 1837 (7 Will. 4 & 1 Vict. c. cx))
River Dane Navigation Act 1720	7 Geo. 1. St. 1. c. 17	7 June 1721
An Act for making navigable the River Dane, from Northwich, where it joins the River Weaver, to the falling in of Wheelock-Brook; and Wheelock Brook, up to Wheelock-Bridge, in the County of Chester.
Highgate and Chipping Barnet Road Act 1720 (repealed)	7 Geo. 1. St. 1. c. 18	7 June 1721
An Act for enlarging the Term granted by an Act passed in the Tenth Year of the Reign of Her late Majesty Queen Anne, intituled, "An Act for repairing the Road from Highgate Gatehouse, in the County of Middlesex, to Barnet Blockhouse, in the County of Hertford;" (Note: Highgate and Chipping Barnet Road Act 1711 (10 Ann. c. 4)) and for repairing the Road leading from The Bear-Inn in Hadley, to the Sign of The Angel in Enfield Chace, in the said County of Middlesex. (Repealed by Highgate and South Mimms Road Act 1815 (55 Geo. 3. c. l))
Bath Highways, Streets, etc. Act 1720 (repealed)	7 Geo. 1. St. 1. c. 19	7 June 1721
An Act for continuing an Act made in the Sixth Year of the Reign of Her late Majesty Queen Anne, intituled, "An Act for repairing and enlarging the Highways between the Top of Kingsdown Hill (Note: Kingsdown Hill is adjacent to Kingsdown in Somerset. 51°24′10″N 2°16′12″W) and the City of Bath; and also several Highways leading to and through the said City; and for cleansing, paving, and lightening the Streets, and regulating the Chairmen there;" (Note: Bath Highway, Streets, etc. Act 1707 (6 Ann. c. 42)) and for explaining and making the said Act more effectual. (Repealed by Bath (Streets, Buildings, Watch, etc.) Act 1757 (30 Geo. 2. c. 65) and Bath Roads Act 1793 (33 Geo. 3. c. 144))
Taxation, etc. Act 1720 (repealed)	7 Geo. 1. St. 1. c. 20	24 June 1721
An Act for continuing the Duties on Malt, Mum, Cyder, and Perry, to raise Money, by Way of a Lottery, for the Service of the Year One Thousand Seven Hundred Twenty-one; and for transferring the Deficiency of a late Malt Act to the Land Tax for the said Year; and for disposing certain Overplus Money to proper Objects of Charity; and for giving further Time to Clerks and Apprentices to pay Duties omitted to be paid for their Indentures and Contracts; and touching small Quantities of Cyder exported; and for Relief of Captain John Perry, concerning Daggenham Breach; and touching lost Bills, Tickets, or Orders; and concerning the Duty of small Preces of Plate, and to enable the Undertakers for raising Thomas Water, in York Buildings, to sell Annuities, by Way of a Lottery; and for satisfying a Debt, which was charged on the late Duty on Hops; and for appropriating the Monies granted in this Session of Parliament. (Repealed by Statute Law Revision Act 1867 (30 & 31 Vict. c. 59))
Trade to East Indies, etc. Act 1720 (repealed)	7 Geo. 1. St. 1. c. 21	24 June 1721
An Act for the further preventing His Majesty's Subjects from trading to The East Indies under Foreign Commissions, and for encouraging and further securing the lawful Trade thereto; and for further regulating the Pilots of Dover, Deal, and the Isle of Thanet. (Repealed by Statute Law Revision Act 1867 (30 & 31 Vict. c. 59))
Crown Lands (Forfeited Estates) Act 1720 (repealed)	7 Geo. 1. St. 1. c. 22	24 June 1721
An Act for enabling Charles Earl of Arran to purchase the forfeited Estates of James Butler, late Duke of Ormonde; and for granting Relief to William late Lord Widdrington; and for enlarging the Time for determining Claims upon the forfeited Estates; and for enabling the Commissioners for the said forfeited Estates to certify into the Exchequer all such Estates as they have found to be given to Popish or Superstitious Uses. (Repealed by Statute Law Revision Act 1948 (11 & 12 Geo. 6. c. 62))
Ledbury Highways Act 1720 (repealed)	7 Geo. 1. St. 1. c. 23	24 June 1721
An Act for repairing the several Roads leading from the Town of Ledbury, in the County of Hereford, to the several Places therein mentioned. (Repealed by Hereford and Gloucester Roads Act 1789 (29 Geo. 3. c. 104))
Buckinghamshire Roads Act 1720 (repealed)	7 Geo. 1. St. 1. c. 24	24 June 1721
An Act for repairing the Road from Wendover to the Town of Buckingham, in the County of Bucks. (Repealed by Beaconsfield and Uxbridge Road Act 1806 (46 Geo. 3. c. cii), Wendover and Buckingham Road Act 1810 (50 Geo. 3. c. xcix) and Roads from Wendover and from the River Colne Act 1812 (52 Geo. 3. c. xxx))
Jedburgh Beer Duties Act 1720 (repealed)	7 Geo. 1. St. 1. c. 25	24 June 1721
An Act for laying a Duty of Two Pennies Scots, or One Sixth Part of a Penny Sterling, upon every Scots Pint of Ale or Beer that shall be brewed for Sale, vended, or tapped, within the Town of Jedburgh, and Privileges thereof, for paying the public Debts of the said Town, and for supplying the same with fresh Water; and for other Purposes therein mentioned. (Repealed by Statute Law Revision Act 1948 (11 & 12 Geo. 6. c. 62))
Marylebone Road Act 1720 (repealed)	7 Geo. 1. St. 1. c. 26	24 June 1721
An Act for repairing the Road from St. Giles's Pound (Note: St Giles's Pound, at the corner of Oxford Street and Tottenham Court Road.) to Kilbourne-Bridge, (Note: Kilburn Bridge was located where the Edgware Road (Kilburn High Road) crossed the River Westbourne. The river is now culverted. 51°32′08″N 0°11′25″W) in the County of Middlesex. (Repealed by Metropolis Roads Act 1826 (7 Geo. 4. c. cxlii) (Note: Incorrectly cited as "7 Geo. 4. c. cxli" in the Chronological Table of the Statutes; that chapter is the unrelated Shrewsbury Poor Relief Act 1826.))
Pension Duties Act 1720 (repealed)	7 Geo. 1. St. 1. c. 27	29 July 1721
An Act for raising a Sum, not exceeding Five Hundred Thousand Pounds, by charging Annuities at the Rate of Five Pounds per Centum per Annum upon the Civil List Revenues, till redeemed by the Crown; and for enabling His Majesty, His Heirs or Successors, (by causing such a Deduction to be made as therein is mentioned) to make good to the Civil List the Payments which shall have been made upon the said Annuities; and for borrowing Money upon certain Lottery Tickets; and for discharging the Corporations for Assurances of Part of the Money, which they were obliged to pay to His Majesty; and for making good a Deficiency to the East India Company. (Repealed by Statute Law Revision Act 1870 (33 & 34 Vict. c. 69), Customs and Inland Revenue Act 1876 (39 & 40 Vict. c. 16), Statute Law Revision Act 1887 (50 & 51 Vict. c. 59) and Statute Law Revision Act 1948 (11 & 12 Geo. 6. c. 62))
South Sea Company (No. 3) Act 1720 (repealed)	7 Geo. 1. St. 1. c. 28	29 July 1721
An Act for raising Money, upon the Estates of the late Sub-governor, Deputy Governor, Directors, Cashier, Deputy Cashier, and Accomptant, of the South Sea Company, and of John Aislabie Esquire, and likewise of James Craggs Senior Esquire, deceased, towards making good the great Loss and Damage sustained by the said Company; and for disabling such of the said Persons as are living, to hold any Office or Place of Trust under the Crown, or to sit or vote in Parliament, for the future; and for other Purposes in the said Act expressed. (Repealed by Statute Law Revision Act 1867 (30 & 31 Vict. c. 59))
General Pardon Act 1720 (repealed)	7 Geo. 1. St. 1. c. 29	29 July 1721
An Act for the King's most Gracious General and Free Pardon. (Repealed by Statute Law Revision Act 1867 (30 & 31 Vict. c. 59))
Debts Due to the Army Act 1720 (repealed)	7 Geo. 1. St. 1. c. 30	29 July 1721
An Act for appointing Commissioners, to examine, state, and determine, the Debts due to the Army. (Repealed by Statute Law Revision Act 1867 (30 & 31 Vict. c. 59))
Bankrupts Act 1720 (repealed)	7 Geo. 1. St. 1. c. 31	29 July 1721
An Act for explaining and making more effectual the several Acts concerning Bankrupts. (Repealed by Bankruptcy Act 1825 (6 Geo. 4. c. 16))
Shoreditch Highways Act 1720 (repealed)	7 Geo. 1. St. 1. c. 32	29 July 1721
An Act to explain and amend the Act of the Twelfth Year of Her late Majesty's Reign, intituled, "An Act for repairing the Highway or Road from The Stones-End, in the Parish of St. Leonard Shoreditch, in the County of Middlesex, to the furthermost Part of the Northern Road in the Parish of Endfield, in the same County, next to the Parish of Cheshunt, in the County of Hertford. (Note: Shoreditch Highways Act 1712 (12 Ann. c. 19)) (Repealed by Middlesex Roads Act 1789 (29 Geo. 3. c. 96))

=== Private acts ===
Short title	Citation	Royal assent
Long title
Robethon's Naturalization Act 1720.	7 Geo. 1. St. 1. c. 1 Pr.	25 January 1721
An Act for naturalizing John Robethon and George Robethon his Son.
Naturalization of Joachim Peterssen, Henry Muilman, Benedict Coep and John Ott.	7 Geo. 1. St. 1. c. 2 Pr.	11 February 1721
An Act to naturalize Joachim Peterssen, Henry Muilman, Benedict Koep, and John Henry Ott.
Lighthorne Inclosure Act 1720	7 Geo. 1. St. 1. c. 3 Pr.	23 March 1721
An Act to enclose the Common Field of Lighthorne, and a Common called Lighthorne Heath, in the County of Warwick.
Stokesby Common Inclosure etc. Act 1720	7 Geo. 1. St. 1. c. 4 Pr.	23 March 1721
An Act for draining, improving, and enclosing, the Common called Stokesby Common, in the Parish of Stokesby, in the County of Norfolk.
Earl of Aylesford's Estate Act 1720	7 Geo. 1. St. 1. c. 5 Pr.	23 March 1721
An Act to enable the Right Honourable Heneage Earl of Aylesford to sell certain Estates of Leasehold and Inheritance, in the County of Kent, comprized in his Marriage Settlement; and to purchase another Estate, in the County of Leicester, of better Value, to be settled to the same Uses.
Countess of Denbigh's Naturalization Act 1720	7 Geo. 1. St. 1. c. 6 Pr.	23 March 1721
An Act for the Naturalization of Isabella Countess of Denbigh, Wife of William Earl of Denbigh.
Hartcup's Naturalization Act 1720	7 Geo. 1. St. 1. c. 7 Pr.	23 March 1721
An Act for naturalizing John Hartcup.
Naturalization of Gilbert de Flines, Christian Zincke and Others Act 1720	7 Geo. 1. St. 1. c. 8 Pr.	23 March 1721
An Act for naturalizing Gilbert de Flines, Christian Frederick Zincke, and others.
Enabling Thomas Lord Parker, Lord Chancellor, John Sutton, Edward and Sarah Ayres and Matthew and Sarah Hawes to make exchanges of land and to perform several agreements.	7 Geo. 1. St. 1. c. 9 Pr.	7 June 1721
An Act to enable the Right Honourable Thomas Lord Parker Baron of Macclesfield Lord High Chancellor of Great Britain, John Sutton Clerk, Edward Ayres and Sarah his Wife, and Mathew Hawes and Sarah his Wife, for and on the Behalf of themselves and of their Infant Children, to make several Exchanges of Lands and Tenements, and to perform their several Agreements touching the same.
Marquis of Halifax's Estate Act 1720	7 Geo. 1. St. 1. c. 10 Pr.	7 June 1721
An Act to vest the Fee and Inheritance of divers Messuages, Lands, and Hereditaments, of William late Marquis of Halifax in Trustees, to be sold, together with a Term of Five Hundred Years by him devised to his Executors in Trust, for the better Performance of his Will.
Earl Rivers' Estate Act 1720	7 Geo. 1. St. 1. c. 11 Pr.	7 June 1721
An Act for settling the Estates of Richard late Earl Rivers deceased, pursuant to an Agreement made between Frederick Earl of Rochford and Bessy Countess of Rochford his Wife, James Barry Earl of Barrymore in the Kingdom of Ireland, and Lady Penelope Barry his Daughter, and John now Earl Rivers, subject to the Payment of the Debts and Legacies of the said late Earl Rivers remaining unpaid; and for other Purposes in the said Act mentioned.
Lord Romney's Estate Act 1720	7 Geo. 1. St. 1. c. 12 Pr.	7 June 1721
An Act for Sale of Part of the Estate of the Right Honourable Robert Lord Romney, in the County of Norfolk; and for settling other Lands, of greater Value, in the County of Kent, already purchased, to the same Uses.
Radcliffe Camera Act 1720	7 Geo. 1. St. 1. c. 13 Pr.	7 June 1721
An Act to enable any Corporations within the University of Oxford, or any other Persons, to sell and convey any Messuages and Ground within the said University, for building a Library, pursuant to the Will of John Radcliffe Doctor in Physic; and for empowering any Colleges in the said University to sell or convey any Ground or Houses to each other, for the Purposes therein mentioned.
Carteret's Estate Act 1720	7 Geo. 1. St. 1. c. 14 Pr.	7 June 1721
An Act to vest the Estate of Sir Charles Carteret Baronet, deceased, in Trustees, for Payment of his Debts; and settling the Remainder to the same Uses in his Will.
Enabling the King to grant the inheritance of certain estates held by leases from Crown by Sir William Pulteney's family, in which more than 100 years are left, to be settled according to uses directed in Sir William's will.	7 Geo. 1. St. 1. c. 15 Pr.	7 June 1721
An Act to enable His Majesty to grant the Inheritance of certain Estates therein mentioned, held by Lease from the Crown, which have been long in the Family of Sir William Pulteney, deceased, and in which more than One Hundred Years are yet to come, to Trustees, upon a full Consideration to be paid for the same, as shall be valued by the proper Officers of the Crown, to the End the same may be settled according to the Uses directed in the Will of the said Sir William Pulteney.
Pagett's Estate Act 1720	7 Geo. 1. St. 1. c. 16 Pr.	7 June 1721
An Act for vesting in Trustees a Moiety of divers Manors and Lands in Essex, belonging to Thomas Pagett Esquire and Mary his Wife, to enable them to convey the same, according to Articles for the Sale thereof.
Perrot Packington's Estate Act 1720	7 Geo. 1. St. 1. c. 17 Pr.	7 June 1721
An Act to enable Herbert Perrot Pakington Esquire, only Son of Sir John Pakington Baronet, to acknowledge Fines, and suffer Recoveries, while he is under the Age of One and Twenty Years.
Harrington's Estate Act 1720	7 Geo. 1. St. 1. c. 18 Pr.	7 June 1721
An Act for vesting certain Lands and Tenements, in the County of Gloucester, the Estate of Henry Harington Gentleman, in Trustees, to be sold; and, with the Money arising thereby, to purchase other Lands, of greater Yearly Value, to be settled to the same Uses as the Estate to be sold is settled; and for other Purposes therein mentioned.
Bridges's Estate Act 1720	7 Geo. 1. St. 1. c. 19 Pr.	7 June 1721
An Act to enable Harry Bridges Esquire to sell the Manors of Ilebrewers, in the County of Somerset, for Payment of his Daughter's Portion, and Legacies charged thereupon.
Discharging estates in Norfolk and Suffolk of and from the uses and limitations contained in the marriage settlement of Thomas de Grey and settling other estates in the said counties to the same uses.	7 Geo. 1. St. 1. c. 20 Pr.	7 June 1721
An Act for discharging certain Estates in the Counties of Norfolk and Suffolk, of and from the Uses and Limitations contained in the Marriage Settlement of Thomas De Grey Esquire; and for settling other Estates, in the said Counties, to the same Uses.
Clavering's Estate Act 1720	7 Geo. 1. St. 1. c. 21 Pr.	7 June 1721
An Act to enable James Clavering Junior Esquire to make Sale of his Estate at Tanfield, in the County of Durham, freed from the Uses and Trusts in the said James Clavering's Marriage Settlement; and to settle his Estate at Hall Hill, in the said County, to the same Uses.
Rolfe's Estate Act 1720	7 Geo. 1. St. 1. c. 22 Pr.	7 June 1721
An Act for vesting the Manors of Burnells, alias Riston, and certain Lands in Norfolk, Part of the Estate of Jonas Rolfe Gentleman and Lucy his Wife, in Trustees, to be sold, for discharging the Incumbrances thereon; and for other Purposes therein mentioned.
Paynter's Estate Act 1720	7 Geo. 1. St. 1. c. 23 Pr.	7 June 1721
An Act to enable Robert Paynter Esquire to sell the Manors of Twydall and East Court, in the County of Kent; and to settle other Lands, of greater Value, to the same or the like Uses.
Earl of Kildare's Estate Act 1720	7 Geo. 1. St. 1. c. 24 Pr.	24 June 1721
An Act for Sale of the Estate of John late Earl of Kildare, deceased, in the County of Limerick, within the Kingdom of Ireland, for Payment of the Charges and Incumbrances thereon; and for other Purposes therein mentioned.
Cambridge's Estate Act 1720	7 Geo. 1. St. 1. c. 25 Pr.	24 June 1721
An Act for discharging Part of the Estate of Richard Cambridge Esquire, in the County of Gloucester, from the Uses and Limitations contained in his Marriage Settlement; and for settling another Estate, in the same County, of better Value, to the same Uses.
Ellenhall, Seighford and Ronton (Staffordshire) Inclosure Act 1720	7 Geo. 1. St. 1. c. 26 Pr.	24 June 1721
An Act for enclosing the Heath, or Common, called Broadheath, in the Parishes of Ellenhall, Seighford, and Ronton, in the County of Stafford.
Naturalization of James Masse and Jacob Stolck.	7 Geo. 1. St. 1. c. 27 Pr.	24 June 1721
An Act for naturalizing James Mosse and Jacob Stolck.
De Neufuille's Naturalization Act 1720	7 Geo. 1. St. 1. c. 28 Pr.	24 June 1721
An Act for naturalizing John de Neusville.
Confirming manor of Lathem (Lancashire) to Richard Waring, Bryan Fairfax and Thomas Ashurst, subject to trusts to which the same are now liable and discharged of a clause in letters patent of Charles I for reconveying the reversion in fee to the Crown.	7 Geo. 1. St. 1. c. 29 Pr.	29 July 1721
An Act for confirming the Manor of Lathom, and divers Lands, in the County of Lancaster, of Richard Warcing, Bryan Fairfax, and Thomas Ashburst, Esquires, and their Heirs, subject to the Trusts to which the same are now liable, and discharged of a certain Clause in Letters Patent of King Charles the First, for re-conveying the Reversion in Fee to the Crown.
Lechmere's Estate Act 1720	7 Geo. 1. St. 1. c. 30 Pr.	29 July 1721
An Act for vesting Part of the Estate late of Anthony Lechmere Esquire, deceased, in Trustees, to be sold, for Payment of his Debts.
Bell's Estate Act 1720	7 Geo. 1. St. 1. c. 31 Pr.	29 July 1721
An Act for the Sale of the Manor of Radwell, and other the Estate of Robert Bell Esquire, and Richard Bell his Son, in Radwell and Norton, in the County of Hertford; and for purchasing other Lands, to be settled to the same Uses.
Gwynn's Estate Act 1720	7 Geo. 1. St. 1. c. 32 Pr.	29 July 1721
An Act for Sale of the Estate late of Richard Gwyn Gentleman, in the County of Brecon, for Payment of Debts; and for the settling of an Estate, in the County of Carmarthen, to certain Purposes therein mentioned.
Nedham's Estate Act 1720	7 Geo. 1. St. 1. c. 33 Pr.	29 July 1721
An Act for Sale of Part of the Estate of Edward Nedham Gentleman, in the County of Leicester, for Payment of Debts charged thereupon; and for other Purposes therein mentioned.
Jales' Naturalization Act 1720	7 Geo. 1. St. 1. c. 34 Pr.	29 July 1721
An Act for naturalizing John Frederick Jales.

=== Sources ===
- Pickering, Danby, ed. (1765). "Anno septimo Georgii I. Stat. 1". The Statutes at Large. Vol. 14: From the Fifth to the Ninth Year of King George I. Cambridge: Joseph Bentham. pp. 298–359 – via Internet Archive.
- Pickering, Danby, ed. (1765). "Anno septimo Georgii I. Stat. 1". The Statutes at Large. Vol. 14: From the Fifth to the Ninth Year of King George I. Cambridge: Joseph Bentham. pp. 298–359 – via Google Books.
- Pickering, Danby, ed. (1765). "Anno septimo Georgii I. Stat. 1". The Statutes at Large. Vol. 14: From the Fifth to the Ninth Year of King George I. Cambridge: Joseph Bentham. pp. 298–359 – via Internet Archive.
- Journals of the House of Commons. Vol. 19. London: His Majesty's Stationery Office. 1803. pp. 377–640 – via Google Books.
- Chronological Table of and Index to the Statutes. Vol. 1: To the End of the Session 59 Vict. Sess. 2 (1895) (13th ed.). London: Her Majesty's Stationery Office. 1896. pp. 95–96 – via Google Books.

== See also ==
- List of acts of the Parliament of Great Britain
