= List of acts of the Parliament of England from 1571 =

This is a list of acts of the Parliament of England for the year 1571.

For acts passed during the period 1707–1800, see the list of acts of the Parliament of Great Britain. See also the list of acts of the Parliament of Scotland, and the list of acts of the Parliament of Ireland.

For acts passed from 1801 onwards, see the list of acts of the Parliament of the United Kingdom. For acts of the devolved parliaments and assemblies in the United Kingdom, see the list of acts of the Scottish Parliament, the list of acts of the Northern Ireland Assembly, and the list of acts and measures of Senedd Cymru; see also the list of acts of the Parliament of Northern Ireland.

For medieval statutes, etc. that are not considered to be acts of Parliament, see the list of English statutes.

See also the List of ordinances and acts of the Parliament of England, 1642–1660 for ordinances and acts passed by the Long Parliament and other bodies without royal assent, and which were not considered to be valid legislation following the Restoration in 1660.

The number shown after each act's title is its chapter number. Acts are cited using this number, preceded by the years of the reign during which the relevant parliamentary session was held; thus the Union with Ireland Act 1800 is cited as "39 & 40 Geo. 3. c. 67", meaning the 67th act passed during the session that started in the 39th year of the reign of George III and which finished in the 40th year of that reign. The modern convention is to use Arabic numerals in citations (thus "41 Geo. 3" rather than "41 Geo. III"). Acts of the last session of the Parliament of Great Britain and the first session of the Parliament of the United Kingdom are both cited as "41 Geo. 3".

Acts passed by the Parliament of England did not have a short title; however, some of these acts have subsequently been given a short title by acts of the Parliament of the United Kingdom, such as the Short Titles Act 1896 (59 & 60 Vict. c. 14).

Acts passed by the Parliament of England were deemed to have come into effect on the first day of the session in which they were passed. Because of this, the years given in the list below may in fact be the year before a particular act was passed.

== 13 Eliz. 1 ==
The 3rd Parliament of Queen Elizabeth I, which met from 2 April 1571 until 29 May 1571.

This session was traditionally cited as 13 Eliz., 13 Elz. or 13 El.

=== Public acts ===
Short title	Citation	Royal assent
Long title
Treasons Act 1571 (repealed)	13 Eliz. 1. c. 1	29 May 1571
An Acte whereby certayne Offences be made Treason. (Repealed by Statute Law Revision Act 1863 (26 & 27 Vict. c. 125))
Bulls, etc., from Rome Act 1571 (repealed)	13 Eliz. 1. c. 2	29 May 1571
An Acte agaynste the bringing in and putting in Execution of Bulls and other Instruments from the Sea of Rome. (Repealed by Statute Law Revision Act 1863 (26 & 27 Vict. c. 125), Statute Law Revision Act 1948 (11 & 12 Geo. 6. c. 62), Criminal Law Act 1967 (c. 58), Statute Law (Repeals) Act 1969 (c. 52))
Fugitives Act 1571 (repealed)	13 Eliz. 1. c. 3	29 May 1571
An Act against Fugitives over the Seas. (Repealed by Statute Law Revision Act 1863 (26 & 27 Vict. c. 125))
Liability of Crown Accountants Act 1571 (repealed)	13 Eliz. 1. c. 4	29 May 1571
An Act, That the Lands, Tenements, Goods, and Chattels, of Treasurers, Receivers, Tellers, etc. shall be liable to the Payment of their Debts. (Repealed by Law of Property (Amendment) Act 1924 (15 & 16 Geo. 5. c. 5))
Fraudulent Conveyances Act 1571 (repealed)	13 Eliz. 1. c. 5	29 May 1571
An Act against Fraudulent Gifts. (Repealed by Law of Property Act 1925 (15 & 16 Geo. 5. c. 20))
Letters Patent Act 1571	13 Eliz. 1. c. 6	29 May 1571
An Acte that Constathes and Exemplifications of Letters Patentes shalbe as good and avayleable as the Letters Patentes themselves.
Bankrupts Act 1571 (repealed)	13 Eliz. 1. c. 7	29 May 1571
An Act touching Orders for Bankrupts. (Repealed by Bankruptcy Act 1825 (6 Geo. 4. c. 16))
Usury Act 1571 (repealed)	13 Eliz. 1. c. 8	29 May 1571
An Act against Usury. (Repealed by Usury Laws Repeal Act 1854 (17 & 18 Vict. c. 90))
Commission of Sewers Act 1571 (repealed)	13 Eliz. 1. c. 9	29 May 1571
An Act for the Commission of Sewers. (Repealed by Land Drainage Act 1930 (20 & 21 Geo. 5. c. 44))
Ecclesiastical Leases Act 1571 (repealed)	13 Eliz. 1. c. 10	29 May 1571
An Acte against Fraudes, defeating Remedies for Dilapidations, &c. (Repealed by Statute Law (Repeals) Act 1998 (c. 43))
Navigation Act 1571 (repealed)	13 Eliz. 1. c. 11	29 May 1571
An Act for the Maintenance of Navigation. (Repealed by Weights and Measures Act 1824 (5 Geo. 4. c. 74))
Ordination of Ministers Act 1571 (repealed)	13 Eliz. 1. c. 12	29 May 1571
An Acte to refourme certayne Dysorders touching Ministers of the Churche. (Repealed for Northern Ireland by Statute Law Revision Act 1953 (2 & 3 Eliz. 2. c. 5) and for England and Wales by Statute Law Revision Act 1863 (26 & 27 Vict. c. 125), Clerical Subscription Act 1865 (28 & 29 Vict. c. 122), Statute Law Revision Act 1948 (11 & 12 Geo. 6. c. 62), Clergy (Ordination and Miscellaneous Provisions) Measure 1964 (No. 6) and Statute Law (Repeals) Act 1969 (c. 52))
Tillage Act 1571 (repealed)	13 Eliz. 1. c. 13	29 May 1571
An Act for the Encrease of Tillage. (Repealed by Statute Law Revision Act 1863 (26 & 27 Vict. c. 125))
Importation Act 1571 (repealed)	13 Eliz. 1. c. 14	29 May 1571
An Act for the bringing of Bowstaves into the Realm. (Repealed by Repeal of Acts Concerning Importation Act 1822 (3 Geo. 4. c. 41))
Hoys Act 1571 (repealed)	13 Eliz. 1. c. 15	29 May 1571
An Act, That no Hoy or Plate shall cross the Seas. (Repealed by Repeal of Acts Concerning Importation Act 1822 (3 Geo. 4. c. 41))
Attainders of Earl of Westmorland and others Act 1571 (repealed)	13 Eliz. 1. c. 16	29 May 1571
An Acte for the confirmation of Thattaynders of Charles Earle of Westmerlande Thomas Earle of Northumberland and others. (Repealed by Statute Law (Repeals) Act 1977 (c. 18))
Earl of Leicester's Hospital Act 1571	13 Eliz. 1. c. 17	29 May 1571
An Act to license the Earl of Leycetre, to found an Hospital.
River Lee Navigation Act 1571 or the Lee Navigation Improvement Act 1571 (repealed)	13 Eliz. 1. c. 18	29 May 1571
An Acte for the brynging of the Ryver of Lee to the Northside of the Citie of London. (Repealed by Statute Law Revision Act 1948 (11 & 12 Geo. 6. c. 62))
Caps Act 1571 (repealed)	13 Eliz. 1. c. 19	29 May 1571
An Act for the making of Caps. (Repealed by Continuance, etc. of Laws Act 1597 (39 Eliz. 1. c. 18))
Benefices Act 1571 (repealed)	13 Eliz. 1. c. 20	29 May 1571
An Acte touchinge Leasses of Benefices and other Ecclesiasticall Lyvynges with Cure. (Repealed by Ecclesiastical Leases Act 1572 (14 Eliz. 1. c. 11), Statute Law Revision Act 1863 (26 & 27 Vict. c. 125) and Statute Law Revision Act 1948 (11 & 12 Geo. 6. c. 62))
Purveyance Act 1571 (repealed)	13 Eliz. 1. c. 21	29 May 1571
An Act, That Purveyors may take Grain, Corn, and Victuals, within Five Miles of Cambridge and Oxforde, in certain Cases. (Repealed by Statute Law Revision Act 1863 (26 & 27 Vict. c. 125))
Sheriffs Act 1571 (repealed)	13 Eliz. 1. c. 22	29 May 1571
An Act to continue the Statute for Severance of Sheriffs in divers Counties. (Repealed by Statute Law Revision Act 1863 (26 & 27 Vict. c. 125))
London Streets Act 1571 (repealed)	13 Eliz. 1. c. 23	29 May 1571
An Acte for pavyng of a Streete without Algate. (Repealed by Statute Law Revision Act 1948 (11 & 12 Geo. 6. c. 62))
Ipswich Improvement Act 1571 (repealed)	13 Eliz. 1. c. 24	29 May 1571
An Act for the paving of the Town of Ipsewiche. (Repealed by Ipswich Improvement Act 1837 (7 Will. 4 & 1 Vict. c. lxxiii))
Continuance of Laws Act 1571 (repealed)	13 Eliz. 1. c. 25	29 May 1571
An Act for the Reviving and Continuance of certain Statutes. (Repealed by Statute Law Revision Act 1863 (26 & 27 Vict. c. 125))
Taxation Act 1571 (repealed)	13 Eliz. 1. c. 26	29 May 1571
An Act for Confirmation of a Subsidy granted by the Clergy. (Repealed by Statute Law Revision Act 1863 (26 & 27 Vict. c. 125))
Taxation (No. 2) Act 1571 (repealed)	13 Eliz. 1. c. 27	29 May 1571
An Act of a Subsidy, and Two Fifteenths and Tenths, granted by the Temporalty. (Repealed by Statute Law Revision Act 1863 (26 & 27 Vict. c. 125))
Act of General Pardon 1571 (repealed)	13 Eliz. 1. c. 28	29 May 1571
An Act of the Queen's Highness's most Gracious, General, and Free Pardon. (Repealed by Statute Law Revision Act 1863 (26 & 27 Vict. c. 125))
Oxford and Cambridge Act 1571	13 Eliz. 1. c. 29	29 May 1571
An Acte for Thincorporacion of bothe Thunyversities.

=== Private acts ===
Short title	Citation	Royal assent
Long title
Welland Navigation Act 1571	13 Eliz. 1. c. 1 Pr.	29 May 1571
An Act to make the River of Weylande navigable.
Peregrine Bertie's Denization Act 1571	13 Eliz. 1. c. 2 Pr.	29 May 1571
An Act to make Free Denizen Peregrine Bertye, (Note: Peregrine Bertie, 13th Baron Willoughby de Eresby) born beyond the Seas.
Southampton (Importation of Wines) Act 1571	13 Eliz. 1. c. 3 Pr.	29 May 1571
An Act for the Town of Southampton.
Bristol Merchant Adventurers (Repeal) Act 1571	13 Eliz. 1. c. 4 Pr.	29 May 1571
An Act for the Town of Bristowe.
Lostwithiel (Cornwall) Act 1571	13 Eliz. 1. c. 5 Pr.	29 May 1571
An Act for the Town of Lostwithiel, in Cornewall.
Skeffington's Estate Act 1571	13 Eliz. 1. c. 6 Pr.	29 May 1571
An Act touching Willyam Skeffington, Esquire.
Morice Rodney's Act 1571	13 Eliz. 1. c. 7 Pr.	29 May 1571
An Act touching Morryce Rodneye, Esquire.
Thomas Wyat's Children's Restitution Act 1571	13 Eliz. 1. c. 8 Pr.	29 May 1571
An Act for the Restitution in Blood of Sir Thomas Wyatt's Children.
Union of Weymouth and Melcombe Regis Act 1571	13 Eliz. 1. c. 9 Pr.	29 May 1571
An Act for the Incorporation and Uniting of Weymouthe and Melcombe Regis, (Note: Weymouth and Melcombe Regis (UK Parliament constituency)) in Dorsettshire.
Henry Brereton's Restitution Act 1571	13 Eliz. 1. c. 10 Pr.	29 May 1571
An Act for the Restitution in Blood of Henry Brereton, Esquire.
Lord Berkeley's Estate Act 1571	13 Eliz. 1. c. 11 Pr.	29 May 1571
An Act for the Assurance of certain Lands to the Lord Barckley, and Lady Katheryne his Wife.
John Tyrrell's Act 1571	13 Eliz. 1. c. 12 Pr.	29 May 1571
An Act touching John Tyrrell, Esquire.

=== Sources ===
- "13° Eliz.". The Statutes of the Realm. Vol. 4 Part 1: 1547 to 1584. pp. 525–586 – via HathiTrust.
- Pickering, Danby, ed. (1763). "Anno decimo tertio Elizabethæ". The Statutes at Large. Vol. 6: from the First Year of Queen Mary to the Thirty-fifth Year of Queen Elizabeth, inclusive. Cambridge: Joseph Bentham. pp. 257–297 – via Internet Archive.
- Pickering, Danby, ed. (1763). "Anno decimo tertio Elizabethæ". The Statutes at Large. Vol. 6: from the First Year of Queen Mary to the Thirty-fifth Year of Queen Elizabeth, inclusive. Cambridge: Joseph Bentham. pp. 257–297 – via Internet Archive.
- Journal of the House of Commons. Vol. 1 – 1547-1629. His Majesty's Stationery Office. 1802 – via British History Online.
- Journal of the House of Lords. Vol. 1: 1509-1577. London: His Majesty's Stationery Office. 1830 – via British History Online.
- Chronological Table of and Index to the Statutes. Vol. 1: To the End of the Session 59 Vict. Sess. 2 (1895) (13th ed.). London: Her Majesty's Stationery Office. 1896. pp. 60–61 – via Google Books.
- Chronological Table of the Statutes: Covering the Period from 1235 to the End of 1971. London: Her Majesty's Stationery Office. 1972. p. 58. ISBN 978-0-11-840096-1 – via Google Books.
- "Acts of the English Parliament from 1571". legislation.gov.uk. The National Archives.
- "Chronological Tables of the Private and Personal Acts: Part 1 (1539–1601)". legislation.gov.uk. The National Archives.

== See also ==
- List of acts of the Parliament of England
