= Bankruptcy Reform Act of 1978 =

United States Act of Congress regulating bankruptcy

- Long title: An act to establish a uniform law on the subject of bankruptcies.
- Enacted by: the 95th United States Congress
- Effective: November 6, 1978

Citations
- Public law: 95-598
- Statutes at Large: 92 Stat. 2549

Codification
- Titles amended: 11 U.S.C.: Bankruptcy
- U.S.C. sections created: 11 U.S.C. ch. 1

Legislative history
- Introduced in the House as H.R. 8200 by Don Edwards (D-CA) on July 11, 1977; Committee consideration by House Judiciary, Senate Judiciary; Passed the House on February 1, 1978 (405-4); Passed the Senate on September 7, 1978 (51-20, in lieu of S. 2266) with amendment; House agreed to Senate amendment on September 28, 1978 (agreed) with further amendment; Senate agreed to House amendment on October 5, 1978 (agreed); Signed into law by President Jimmy Carter on November 6, 1978

The Bankruptcy Reform Act of 1978 (Pub. L. 95–598, 92 Stat. 2549, November 6, 1978) is a United States Act of Congress regulating bankruptcy and established the modern "chapter system" currently in place.

The current Bankruptcy Code was enacted in 1978 by § 101 of the Act which generally became effective on October 1, 1979. The current Code completely replaced the former Bankruptcy Act of 1898, sometimes called the "Nelson Act" (Act of July 1, 1898, ch. 541, 30 Stat. 544). The current Code has been amended multiple times since 1978. (See, e.g. Bankruptcy Abuse Prevention and Consumer Protection Act of 2005.)

This Act prohibits employment discrimination against anyone who has declared bankruptcy.

== Provisions ==
Under this Act the following chapters were established:

- Chapter 7 concerns the ability of persons, partnerships, and corporations to liquidate their assets and dispose of their debts. This form of bankruptcy is listed on a credit report for a length of 10 years. To qualify for this form of bankruptcy the debtor is subject to a means test
- Chapter 9 concerns the ability of municipalities to restructure their existing debt into a more manageable timeline
- Chapter 11 concerns the ability of railroads and most persons under chapter 7 to reorganize their debts while continuing operations. This form of bankruptcy is listed on a credit report for a length of 10 years.
- Chapter 12 concerns the ability of farmers and fisherman with regular income to restructure their existing debt into a more manageable timeline
- Chapter 13 concerns the ability of wage earners with regular income to restructure their existing debt into a more manageable timeline. This form of bankruptcy is listed on a credit report for a length of 7 years.
- Chapter 14 allows for the recognition and insolvency of international debts

== See also ==
- Bankruptcy Act
