= Bankruptcy Act of 1938 =

- Other short titles: Bankruptcy Act of 1898 Amendments; Bankruptcy Revision of 1938; Chandler Act; Chandler Act of 1938
- Long title: A bill to amend an act entitled "An Act to establish a uniform system of bankruptcy throughout the United States" approved July 1, 1898, and acts amendatory thereof and supplementary thereto.
- Enacted by: the 75th United States Congress
- Effective: June 22, 1938

Citations
- Public law: Pub. L. 75–696
- Statutes at Large: 52 Stat. 840

Legislative history
- Introduced in the House as H.R. 8046 by Walter Chandler (D-TN); Signed into law by President Franklin D. Roosevelt on June 22, 1938

The Bankruptcy Act of 1938, also known as the Chandler Act, expanded voluntary access to the bankruptcy system in the United States and made voluntary petitions more attractive to debtors. It also gave authority to the Securities and Exchange Commission in the administration of bankruptcy filings. One effect was to remove investment banks from control of the corporate reorganization process by eliminating the equity receivership technique. Instead, a trustee was appointed by the bankruptcy court to oversee the reorganization process.

The Bankruptcy Act, though now superseded by the Bankruptcy Code, remains an important interpretive tool for current bankruptcy law.

Several United States Supreme Court decisions have interpreted the Bankruptcy Code by looking back to the history of the Chandler Act. Some of the most notable decisions include:

- United States v. Whiting Pools, Inc., 462 U.S. 198 (1983), which justified the practice of requiring the IRS to return a bankrupt company's property under the Bankruptcy Code by reference to previous practice under the Bankruptcy Act. The Court wrote that Congress must have been aware of this previous practice and decided not to change it when it passed the Bankruptcy Code.
- Johnson v. Home State Bank, 501 U.S. 78 (1991), in which the Court looked to the legislative history and precedent of the Bankruptcy Act to interpret the term "claim" in the Bankruptcy Code.
- Fidelity Financial Services, Inc. v. Fink, 522 U.S. 211 (1998), in which the Court considered Bankruptcy Act's rules about and precedent interpreting avoidable preferences to resolve a similar question under the Bankruptcy Code.
- Cohen v. de la Cruz, 523 U.S. 213 (1998), in which the court relied on practice under the Bankruptcy Acts to interpret the non-dischargeability provisions of the Bankruptcy Code.

The practice of using the Bankruptcy Act to interpret the Bankruptcy Code has been criticized by some bankruptcy scholars. They claim that this interpretive tool leads to unpredictable results, may ignore the intent of Congress, and confuses lower courts interpreting Supreme Court decisions.
