= Bankruptcy Act 1861 =

Act of the Parliament of the United Kingdom

Bankruptcy Act 1861 (Note: Section 232.)
- Act of Parliament
- Parliament of the United Kingdom
- Long title: An Act to amend the Law relating to Bankruptcy and Insolvency in England.
- Citation: 24 & 25 Vict. c. 134
- Territorial extent: England and Wales (Note: Section 231.)

Dates
- Royal assent: 6 August 1861
- Commencement: 6 August 1861 as to the appointment of the officers thereby authorised to be appointed.; 11 October 1861 as to all other matters and things.; (Note: Section 232.)
- Repealed: 1 January 1870
Other legislation
Amended by	Bankruptcy Amendment Act 1862
Repealed by	Bankruptcy Repeal and Insolvent Court Act 1869
Relates to	Bankrupt Law Consolidation Act 1849

Status: Repealed

Text of statute as originally enacted

The Bankruptcy Act 1861 (24 & 25 Vict. c. 134) was an act of the Parliament of the United Kingdom.

== Provisions ==
Section 69 of the act abolished the distinction between traders and non traders, so both could apply for bankruptcy.

Section 199 of the act provided that any petition presented after another deed (for example a deed of arrangement with creditors) could be stayed.

=== Short title, commencement and extent ===
Section 231 of the act provided that the act would not extend to Scotland and Ireland unless expressly provided.

Section 232 of the act provided that the act would come into force on 6 August 1861 as to the appointment of authorised officers, and on 11 October 1861 as to all other matters. It also enacted that the statute may be cited as "The Bankruptcy Act, 1861".

== Subsequent developments ==
The whole act was repealed by section 20 of, and the schedule to, the Bankruptcy Repeal and Insolvent Court Act 1869 (32 & 33 Vict. c. 83), which came into force on 1 January 1870.

== Bankruptcy Amendment Act 1862 ==
The act 25 & 26 Vict. c. 99, sometimes called the Bankruptcy Amendment Act 1862, the Bankruptcy Act (1861) Amendment Act or the Bankruptcy Act 1862, was an act of the Parliament of the United Kingdom. The bill for this act was called the Bankruptcy Act (1861) Amendment Bill. Section 4 of the act is said to have been one of the County Courts Acts 1846 to 1887.

The whole act, except section 4, was repealed by section 20 of, and the schedule to, the Bankruptcy Repeal and Insolvent Court Act 1869 (32 & 33 Vict. c. 83), which came into force on 1 January 1870, with savings in section 20.

Section 4 of the act was repealed by section 188 of, and the schedule to, the County Courts Act 1888 (51 & 52 Vict. c. 43), which came into force on 1 January 1889, subject to a proviso in section 188.

== See also ==
- UK insolvency law
- UK bankruptcy law
- History of bankruptcy law
