= Debtors Act 1869 =

Act of the Parliament of the United Kingdom

Debtors Act 1869 (Note: Section 1.)
- Act of Parliament
- Parliament of the United Kingdom
- Long title: An Act for the Abolition of Imprisonment for Debt, for the punishment of fraudulent debtors, and for other purposes.
- Citation: 32 & 33 Vict. c. 62
- Territorial extent: England and Wales (Note: Section 2.)

Dates
- Royal assent: 9 August 1869
- Commencement: 1 January 1870 (Note: Section 3. See section 3 of the Bankruptcy Act 1869 (32 & 33 Vict. c. 71).)
Other legislation
Amended by	Debtors Act 1878; Municipal Corporations Act 1882; Statute Law Revision Act 1883; Bankruptcy Act 1883; Statute Law Revision (No. 2) Act 1893; Costs in Criminal Cases Act 1908; Bankruptcy Act 1914; Indictments Act 1915; Administration of Justice (Miscellaneous Provisions) Act 1933; Justices of the Peace Act 1949; Administration of Justice Act 1956; Criminal Law Act 1967; Theft Act 1968; Administration of Justice Act 1970; Courts Act 1971; Statute Law (Repeals) Act 1989; Civil Procedure (Modification of Enactments) Order 2002; Statute Law (Repeals) Act 2004; Crime and Courts Act 2013
Relates to	Bankruptcy Act 1869; Bankruptcy Repeal and Insolvent Court Act 1869

Status: Amended

Text of statute as originally enacted

Revised text of statute as amended

Text of the Debtors Act 1869 as in force today (including any amendments) within the United Kingdom, from legislation.gov.uk.

The Debtors Act 1869 (32 & 33 Vict. c. 62) is an act of the Parliament of the United Kingdom that aimed to reform the powers of courts to detain debtors.

== Detail ==
In England, debtors owing money could be easily detained by the courts for indefinite periods, being kept in debtor's prisons. Approximately 10,000 people were imprisoned for debt each year during the nineteenth century. However, a prison term did not alleviate a person’s debt; typically, it was required that the creditor be repaid in-full before an inmate was released. Acts of Parliament in 1831 and 1861 had begun the process of reform in this area, but further reform was felt necessary. Among the advocates for debtor's reform was Charles Dickens, who, at the age of 12, saw his father sentenced to debtors' prison. Dickens’ novel Little Dorrit was written to encourage debt reform and was set in the Marshalsea debtors' prison where his father was incarcerated.

In Victorian England, the concepts of credit and debt were closely linked to that of a person's character. Credit was not only determined based on a person's assets and income, but also their social status within the community and their adherence to the moral standards of the time. Going into debt was seen as a moral failure, not merely an economic circumstance, and it was punished accordingly. This system typically favoured the upper classes. It was more difficult for the working classes to obtain credit; and if they went into debt, the penalties they incurred were more severe than those issued to the upper classes. County court judges, who presided over debt and bankruptcy cases, often issued rulings based on the belief that the working classes defaulted on their debts deliberately. In contrast, the upper classes were seen as having an honest desire to repay their debt and were given more lenient treatment.

Declaring bankruptcy allowed a debtor to avoid prison, but this was not an option available to everyone. Until 1861 it was limited to the merchant class. Furthermore, the cost of filing for bankruptcy was £10, which represented 10-20% of the average annual income for the common worker in the mid-1860s.

The act significantly reduced the ability of the courts to detain those in debt, although some provisions were retained. Debtors who had the means to repay their creditors but refused to do so could still be imprisoned, as could those who defaulted on payments to the court. Further reform followed through the Bankruptcy Act 1883 (46 & 47 Vict. c. 52).

These acts initially reduced the number of debtors sentenced to prison, but by the early twentieth century, the annual number had risen to 11,427, an increase of nearly 2,000 from 1869. Imprisonment of debtors was completely abolished by the Administration of Justice Act 1970, following the recommendations of the Payne Committee on the Enforcement of Judgment Debts, with the sole exceptions of debts owed to public authorities and maintenance orders. In 1969, the final full year of debtor imprisonment being legal, 2,364 debtors were imprisoned.

== Subsequent developments ==
Enactments consolidated by this act were repealed by the Bankruptcy Repeal and Insolvent Court Act 1869 (32 & 33 Vict. c. 83).

Section 20 of the act was repealed by section 10(2) of, and part II of schedule 3 to, the Criminal Law Act 1967, which came into force on 1 January 1968.

Sections 24–28 of the act were repealed by section 57(2) of, and the second schedule to, the Administration of Justice Act 1956 (4 & 5 Eliz. 2. c. 46), which came into force on 1 October 1957.

Sections 18 and 23 of the act were repealed by section 1(1) of, and group 4 of part I of schedule 1 to, the Statute Law (Repeals) Act 1989, which came into force on 16 November 1989.

Much of the act has been repealed, but some provisions, such as section 5 relating to the judgment summons procedure, survive.

== See also ==
- UK insolvency law

== Bibliography ==
- Omar, Paul J. (ed) (2008) International insolvency law: themes and perspectives. London: Ashgate. ISBN 978-0-7546-2427-1.
- Rajak, Harry. (2008) "The culture of bankruptcy," in Omar (ed) (2008).
- "Debtors Act 1878" [41 & 42 Vict. c. 54 (1878)]. Legislation.gov.uk. The National Archives of United Kingdom. 13 August 1878.
