= Bankruptcy Act 1883 =

Act of the Parliament of the United Kingdom

Bankruptcy Act 1883 (Note: Section 1.)
- Act of Parliament
- Parliament of the United Kingdom
- Long title: An Act to amend and consolidate the Law of Bankruptcy.
- Citation: 46 & 47 Vict. c. 52
- Territorial extent: England and Wales (Note: Section 2.)

Dates
- Royal assent: 25 August 1883
- Commencement: 1 January 1884 (Note: Section 3.)
- Repealed: 16 November 1989
Other legislation
Amends	See § Repealed enactments
Repeals/revokes	See § Repealed enactments
Amended by	Bankruptcy Act 1914; County Courts Act 1934; Local Government (Scotland) Act 1947; Administration of Justice Act 1956; Statute Law (Repeals) Act 1973; Statute Law (Repeals) Act 1975; Recess Elections Act 1975
Repealed by	Statute Law (Repeals) Act 1989
Relates to	Bankrupt Law Consolidation Act 1849; Bankruptcy Repeal and Insolvent Court Act 1869; Bankruptcy Act 1869

Status: Repealed

Text of statute as originally enacted

The Bankruptcy Act 1883 (46 & 47 Vict. c. 52) was an act of the Parliament of the United Kingdom that amended and consolidated the law of bankruptcy in England and Wales.

== Provisions ==
=== Repealed enactments ===
Section 169(1) of the act repealed 7 enactments, listed in the fifth schedule to the act, as far as they related to England and Wales.

Citation	Short title	Extent of repeal
13 Edw. 1. c. 18	Execution of Damages Act 1285	In part; namely, the words "all the chattels of the debtor saving only his oxen and beasts of the plough, and".
32 & 33 Vict. c. 62	Debtors Act 1869	In part; namely, sub-section (5) of section five, and sections twenty-one and twenty-two.
32 & 33 Vict. c. 71	Bankruptcy Act 1869	The whole act.
32 & 33 Vict. c. 83	Bankruptcy Repeal and Insolvent Court Act 1869	In part; namely, section nineteen.
33 & 34 Vict. c. 76	Absconding Debtors Act 1870	The whole act.
34 & 35 Vict. c. 50	Bankruptcy Disqualification Act 1871	Except sections six, seven, and eight.
38 & 39 Vict. c. 77	Supreme Court of Judicature Act 1875	In part; namely, sections nine and thirty-two.

== Subsequent developments ==
The majority of the act was repealed by section 168(1) of, and the sixth schedule to, the Bankruptcy Act 1914 (4 & 5 Geo. 5. c. 59), which came into operation on 1 January 1915.

Section 146 of the act was repealed by section 57(2) of, and the second schedule to, the Administration of Justice Act 1956 (4 & 5 Eliz. 2. c. 46), which came into force on 1 October 1957.

In section 32(1)(a) of the act, the words from " or being elected " onwards were repealed by section 1(1) of, and part XIII of schedule 1 to, the Statute Law (Repeals) Act 1973, which came into force on 18 July 1973.

The whole act was repealed by section 1(1) of, and group 1 of part I of schedule 1 to, the Statute Law (Repeals) Act 1989, which came into force on 16 November 1989.
