= List of acts of the Parliament of the United Kingdom from 1869 =

This is a complete list of acts of the Parliament of the United Kingdom for the year 1869.

Note that the first parliament of the United Kingdom was held in 1801; parliaments between 1707 and 1800 were either parliaments of Great Britain or of Ireland). For acts passed up until 1707, see the list of acts of the Parliament of England and the list of acts of the Parliament of Scotland. For acts passed from 1707 to 1800, see the list of acts of the Parliament of Great Britain. See also the list of acts of the Parliament of Ireland.

For acts of the devolved parliaments and assemblies in the United Kingdom, see the list of acts of the Scottish Parliament, the list of acts of the Northern Ireland Assembly, and the list of acts and measures of Senedd Cymru; see also the list of acts of the Parliament of Northern Ireland.

The number shown after each act's title is its chapter number. Acts passed before 1963 are cited using this number, preceded by the year(s) of the reign during which the relevant parliamentary session was held; thus the Union with Ireland Act 1800 is cited as "39 & 40 Geo. 3 c. 67", meaning the 67th act passed during the session that started in the 39th year of the reign of George III and which finished in the 40th year of that reign. Note that the modern convention is to use Arabic numerals in citations (thus "41 Geo. 3" rather than "41 Geo. III"). Acts of the last session of the Parliament of Great Britain and the first session of the Parliament of the United Kingdom are both cited as "41 Geo. 3".

Some of these acts have a short title. Some of these acts have never had a short title. Some of these acts have a short title given to them by later acts, such as by the Short Titles Act 1896.

== 32 & 33 Vict. ==
The first session of the 20th Parliament of the United Kingdom, which met from 10 December 1868 until 11 August 1868.

=== Public general acts ===
Short title	Citation	Royal assent
Long title
Consolidated Fund (8,406,272l. 13s. 4d.) Act or the Supply Act 1869 (repealed)	32 & 33 Vict. c. 1	19 March 1869
An Act to apply certain sums out of the Consolidated Fund to the service of the years ending the thirty-first day of March one thousand eight hundred and sixty eight, one thousand eight hundred and sixty-nine, and one thousand eight hundred and seventy. (Repealed by Statute Law Revision Act 1883 (46 & 47 Vict. c. 39))
Brazilian Slave Trade Repeal Act 1869 (repealed)	32 & 33 Vict. c. 2	19 April 1869
An Act for repealing the Act of the session of the eighth and ninth years of the reign of Her present Majesty, chapter one hundred and twenty-two. (Note: Slave Trade (Brazil) Act 1845 (8 & 9 Vict. c. 122)) (Repealed by Slave Trade Act 1873 (36 & 37 Vict. c. 88))
Lord Napier's Salary Act 1869 (repealed)	32 & 33 Vict. c. 3	19 April 1869
An Act to enable Lord Napier of Magdala to receive the full benefit of the Salary of Member of Council for the Presidency of Bombay, or as holding any other office in India, notwithstanding his being in receipt of an Annuity granted to him under the Act thirty-one and thirty-two Victoria, chapter ninety-one. (Note: Annuity (Lord Napier) Act 1868 (31 & 32 Vict. c. 91)) (Repealed by Statute Law (Repeals) Act 1974 (c. 22))
Mutiny Act 1869 (repealed)	32 & 33 Vict. c. 4	19 April 1869
An Act for punishing Mutiny and Desertion, and for the better payment of the Army and their Quarters. (Repealed by Statute Law Revision Act 1883 (46 & 47 Vict. c. 39))
Marine Mutiny Act 1869 (repealed)	32 & 33 Vict. c. 5	19 April 1869
An Act for the Regulation of Her Majesty's Royal Marine Forces while on shore. (Repealed by Statute Law Revision Act 1883 (46 & 47 Vict. c. 39))
Railway Companies Meetings Act 1869 (repealed)	32 & 33 Vict. c. 6	19 April 1869
An Act to repeal so much of The Regulation of Railways Act, 1868 (Note: Regulation of Railways Act 1868 (31 & 32 Vict. c. 119)) as relates to the approval by meetings of incorporated railway companies of bills and certificates for conferring further powers on those companies. (Repealed by Statute Law Revision Act 1883 (46 & 47 Vict. c. 39))
East India Irrigation and Canal Act 1869	32 & 33 Vict. c. 7	19 April 1869
An Act for the confirmation and execution of arrangements made between the Secretary of State in Council of India and the East India Irrigation and Canal Company; and for other purposes connected therewith.
Consolidated Fund (£17,100,000) Act or the Supply (No. 2) Act 1869 (repealed)	32 & 33 Vict. c. 8	13 May 1869
An Act to apply the sum of seventeen million one hundred thousand pounds out of the Consolidated Fund to the service of the year ending the thirty-first day of March one thousand eight hundred and seventy. (Repealed by Statute Law Revision Act 1883 (46 & 47 Vict. c. 39))
Salmon Fishery (Ireland) Act 1869 (repealed)	32 & 33 Vict. c. 9	13 May 1869
An Act to amend The Salmon Fishery (Ireland) Act, 1863, (Note: Salmon Fishery (Ireland) Act 1863 (26 & 27 Vict. c. 114)) and the Acts continuing the temporary provisions of the same. (Repealed by Fisheries Act (Northern Ireland) 1966 (c. 17 (N.I.)))
Colonial Prisoners Removal Act 1869	32 & 33 Vict. c. 10	13 May 1869
An Act for authorizing the Removal of Prisoners from one Colony to another for the purposes of Punishment.
Merchant Shipping (Colonial) Act 1869 (repealed)	32 & 33 Vict. c. 11	13 May 1869
An Act for amending the Law relating to the Coasting Trade and Merchant Shipping in British Possessions. (Repealed by Merchant Shipping Act 1894 (57 & 58 Vict. c. 60))
Naval Stores Act 1869 (repealed)	32 & 33 Vict. c. 12	13 May 1869
An Act for Protection of Naval Stores. (Repealed by Public Stores Act 1875 (38 & 39 Vict. c. 25))
Militia Act 1869 (repealed)	32 & 33 Vict. c. 13	13 May 1869
An Act for amending the Law relating to the Militia. (Repealed by Militia (Voluntary Enlistment) Act 1875 (38 & 39 Vict. c. 69))
Revenue Act 1869 or the Customs and Inland Revenue Duties Act 1869 (repealed)	32 & 33 Vict. c. 14	24 June 1869
An Act to grant certain Duties of Customs and Inland Revenue, and to repeal and alter other Duties of Customs and Inland Revenue. (Repealed by Customs and Excise Act 1952 (15 & 16 Geo. 6 & 1 Eliz. 2. c. 44))
Pensioners Civil Disabilities Relief Act 1869 (repealed)	32 & 33 Vict. c. 15	24 June 1869
An Act to remove doubts as to the qualification of persons holding Civil Service Pensions, or receiving Superannuation Allowances, to sit in Parliament. (Repealed by House of Commons Disqualification Act 1957 (5 & 6 Eliz. 2. c. 20))
Norfolk Island Bishopric Act 1869 (repealed)	32 & 33 Vict. c. 16	24 June 1869
An Act to amend so much of the Act of the session of the sixth and seventh years of the reign of Her present Majesty, chapter thirty-five, (Note: Norfolk Island Act 1843 (6 & 7 Vict. c. 35)) as provides that Norfolk Island is to be part of the diocese of Tasmania. (Repealed by Statute Law Revision Act 1883 (46 & 47 Vict. c. 39))
Sea Birds Preservation Act 1869 (repealed)	32 & 33 Vict. c. 17	24 June 1869
An Act for the Preservation of Sea Birds. (Repealed by Wild Birds Protection Act 1880 (43 & 44 Vict. c. 35))
Lands Clauses Consolidation Act 1869 (repealed)	32 & 33 Vict. c. 18	24 June 1869
An Act to amend the Lands Clauses Consolidation Act. (Note: Lands Clauses Consolidation Act 1845 (8 & 9 Vict. c. 18)) (Repealed by Administration of Justice Act 1964 (c. 42))
Stannaries Act 1869 (repealed)	32 & 33 Vict. c. 19	24 June 1869
An Act for amending the law relating to Mining Partnerships within the Stannaries of Devon and Cornwall, and to the Court of the Vice-Warden of the Stannaries. (Repealed by Statute Law (Repeals) Act 1998 (c. 43))
Oxford University Statutes Act 1869 or the University of Oxford Act 1869 (repealed)	32 & 33 Vict. c. 20	24 June 1869
An Act to remove doubts as to the validity of certain Statutes made by the Convocation of the University of Oxford. (Repealed by Statute Law Revision Act 1883 (46 & 47 Vict. c. 39))
Corrupt Practices Commission Expenses Act 1869 (repealed)	32 & 33 Vict. c. 21	24 June 1869
An Act to amend the law relating to the Payment of the Expenses of Commissioners of Inquiry into Corrupt Practices at Elections of members to serve in Parliament. (Repealed for England and Wales and Scotland by Election Commissioners Act 1949 (12, 13 & 14 Geo. 6. c. 90) and for Northern Ireland by Statute Law Revision (Northern Ireland) Act 1976 (c. 12))
Exchequer Bonds Act 1869 (repealed)	32 & 33 Vict. c. 22	24 June 1869
An Act for raising the sum of two million three hundred thousand pounds by Exchequer Bonds for the service of the year ending on the thirty-first day of March one thousand eight hundred and seventy. (Repealed by Statute Law Revision Act 1883 (46 & 47 Vict. c. 39))
Municipal Corporation (Recorders) Act 1869 or the Borough Recorders' Deputies Act 1869 (repealed)	32 & 33 Vict. c. 23	12 July 1869
An Act to extend the Power of Recorders to appoint Deputies in certain cases. (Repealed by Municipal Corporations Act 1882 (45 & 46 Vict. c. 50))
Newspapers, Printers, and Reading Rooms Repeal Act 1869	32 & 33 Vict. c. 24	12 July 1869
An Act to repeal certain enactments relating to Newspapers, Pamphlets, and other Publications, and to Printers, Typefounders, and Reading Rooms.
Orphan and Deserted Children (Ireland) Act 1869 (repealed)	32 & 33 Vict. c. 25	12 July 1869
An Act to amend the Act of the twenty-fifth and twenty-sixth years of Victoria, chapter eighty-three, (Note: Poor Relief (Ireland) Act 1862 (25 & 26 Vict. c. 83)) section nine, by extending the age at which orphan and deserted children may be kept out at nurse. (Repealed by Pauper Children (Ireland) Act 1876 (39 & 40 Vict. c. 38))
Trustee Appointment Act 1869 (repealed)	32 & 33 Vict. c. 26	12 July 1869
An Act to extend to Burial Grounds the Provisions of the Act of the thirteenth and fourteenth years of Her Majesty, chapter twenty-eight, intituled "An Act to render more simple and effectual the Titles by which Congregations and Societies for Purposes of Religious Worship or Education in England and Ireland hold Property for such Purposes." (Note: Trustee Appointment Act 1850 (13 & 14 Vict. c. 28)) (Repealed by Charities Act 1960 (8 & 9 Eliz. 2. c. 58))
Wine and Beerhouse Act 1869 (repealed)	32 & 33 Vict. c. 27	12 July 1869
An Act to amend the law for licensing Beerhouses, and to make certain alterations with respect to the Sale by retail of Beer, Cider, and Wine. (Repealed by Licensing (Consolidation) Act 1910 (10 Edw. 7 & 1 Geo. 5. c. 24))
Public Parks (Ireland) Act 1869	32 & 33 Vict. c. 28	12 July 1869
An Act to afford facilities for the Establishment and Maintenance of public Parks in Ireland.
India (Inam Lands) Act 1869 (repealed)	32 & 33 Vict. c. 29	12 July 1869
An Act to render valid certain Title Deeds for Inam Lands. (Repealed by Statute Law Revision Act 1883 (46 & 47 Vict. c. 39))
Cowgill Parish Marriages Confirmation, Park Gate Chapel Act 1869	32 & 33 Vict. c. 30	12 July 1869
An Act to legalize certain Marriages celebrated at Park Gate Chapel, and to change the name of the District Chapelry annexed to the Chapel of Cowgill.
Oyster and Mussel Fisheries Orders Confirmation Act 1869 (No. 2) or the Oyster and Mussel Fisheries Orders Confirmation (No. 2) Act 1869 (repealed)	32 & 33 Vict. c. 31	12 July 1869
An Act to confirm an Order made by the Board of Trade under The Sea Fisheries Act, 1868, (Note: Sea Fisheries Act 1868 (31 & 32 Vict. c. 45)) relating to Langston, and to amend the forty-fifth section of The Sea Fisheries Act, 1868. (Repealed by Sea Fisheries (Shellfish) Act 1967 (c. 83) and Statute Law (Repeals) Act 1973 (c. 39))
	Order for the establishment and maintenance by the South of England Oyster Company, Limited, of a several oyster fishery in the Langston Channel and other parts of Langston Harbour in the county of Southampton, and in certain rythes or channels in Chichester Harbour in the said county.	
Pensions Commutation Act 1869 (repealed)	32 & 33 Vict. c. 32	26 July 1869
An Act to provide for the Commutation of Pensions payable to officers and other persons out of the sums voted by Parliament to defray the charges of the army and navy services. (Repealed by Pensions Commutation Act 1871 (34 & 35 Vict. c. 36))
Judicial Statistics (Scotland) Act 1869	32 & 33 Vict. c. 33	26 July 1869
An Act to provide for the Collection of Judicial Statistics in Scotland.
Stipendiary Magistrates' Act 1869 (repealed)	32 & 33 Vict. c. 34	26 July 1869
An Act to amend the Law concerning the appointment of Deputies by Stipendiary Magistrates. (Repealed by Criminal Justice Administration Act 1956 (4 & 5 Eliz. 2. c. 34))
Prisons (Scotland) Amendment Act 1869 (repealed)	32 & 33 Vict. c. 35	26 July 1869
An Act to amend The Prisons (Scotland) Administration Act, 1860. (Note: Prisons (Scotland) Act 1860 (23 & 24 Vict. c. 105)) (Repealed by Prisons (Scotland) Act 1877 (40 & 41 Vict. c. 53))
Juries (Lighthouse Keepers' Exemption) Act 1869 (repealed)	32 & 33 Vict. c. 36	26 July 1869
An Act to amend The Court of Session Act, 1868, (Note: Court of Session Act 1868 (31 & 32 Vict. c. 100)) in so far as the exemption of Lighthouse Keepers and their assistants from serving on Juries is thereby abolished. (Repealed by Law Reform (Miscellaneous Provisions) (Scotland) Act 1980 (c. 55))
Common Pleas at Lancaster Amendment Act 1869 (repealed)	32 & 33 Vict. c. 37	26 July 1869
An Act to authorize the appointment of District Prothonotaries of the Court of Common Pleas of the county palatine of Lancaster, and to provide for the better despatch of business therein. (Repealed by Statute Law Revision Act 1883 (46 & 47 Vict. c. 39))
Bails Act 1869 (repealed)	32 & 33 Vict. c. 38	26 July 1869
An Act to facilitate the taking Special Bails in Civil Proceedings depending in the Superior Courts of Law at Westminster, and in Proceedings in Error and on Appeal. (Repealed by Commissioners for Oaths Act 1889 (52 & 53 Vict. c. 10))
Endowed Institutions (Scotland) Act 1869 (repealed)	32 & 33 Vict. c. 39	26 July 1869
An Act to make provision for the better government and administration of Hospitals and other, endowed institutions in Scotland. (Repealed by Statute Law Revision Act 1883 (46 & 47 Vict. c. 39))
Sunday and Ragged Schools (Exemption from Rating) Act 1869 (repealed)	32 & 33 Vict. c. 40	26 July 1869
An Act to exempt from rating Sunday and Ragged Schools. (Repealed for England and Wales by Rating and Valuation Act 1961 (9 & 10 Eliz. 2. c. 45) and for Scotland by Local Government (Financial Provisions etc.) (Scotland) Act 1962 (10 & 11 Eliz. 2. c. 9))
Poor Rate Assessment and Collection Act 1869 (repealed)	32 & 33 Vict. c. 41	26 July 1869
An Act for amending the Law with respect to the rating of Occupiers for short terms, and the making and collecting of the Poor's Rate. (Repealed by General Rate Act 1967 (c. 9))
Irish Church Act 1869	32 & 33 Vict. c. 42	26 July 1869
An Act to put an end to the Establishment of the Church of Ireland, and to make provision in respect of the Temporalities thereof, and in respect of the Royal College of Maynooth.
Diplomatic Salaries, &c. Act 1869 (repealed)	32 & 33 Vict. c. 43	2 August 1869
An Act to provide for the payment of Diplomatic Salaries, Allowances, and Pensions. (Repealed by Superannuation (Diplomatic Service) Act 1929 (19 & 20 Geo. 5. c. 11))
Greenwich Hospital Act 1869	32 & 33 Vict. c. 44	2 August 1869
An Act to make better provision respecting Greenwich Hospital, and the application of the revenues thereof.
Union Loans Act 1869 (repealed)	32 & 33 Vict. c. 45	2 August 1869
An Act to amend the Law relating to the Repayment of Loans to Poor Law Unions. (Repealed by Poor Law Act 1927 (17 & 18 Geo. 5. c. 14))
Administration of Estates Act 1869 (repealed)	32 & 33 Vict. c. 46	2 August 1869
An Act to abolish the distinction as to priority of payment which now exists between the specialty and simple contract debts of deceased persons. (Repealed for England and Wales by Administration of Estates Act 1925 (15 & 16 Geo. 5. c. 23) and for Northern Ireland by Administration of Estates Act (Northern Ireland) 1955 (c. 24 (N.I.)))
High Constables Act 1869 (repealed)	32 & 33 Vict. c. 47	2 August 1869
An Act to provide for the discharge of the duties heretofore performed by High Constables, and for the abolition of such office, with certain exceptions. (Repealed by Statute Law Revision Act 1883 (46 & 47 Vict. c. 39), Statute Law Revision (No. 2) Act 1893 (56 & 57 Vict. c. 54), Statute Law Revision Act 1953 (2 & 3 Eliz. 2. c. 5) and Justices of the Peace Act 1968 (c. 69))
Companies Clauses Act 1869	32 & 33 Vict. c. 48	2 August 1869
An Act to amend the Companies Clauses Act, 1863. (Note: Companies Clauses Act 1863 (26 & 27 Vict. c. 118))
Local Stamp Act 1869 (repealed)	32 & 33 Vict. c. 49	2 August 1869
An Act to enable Local Authorities to collect Fines and Fees by means of Stamps. (Repealed by Justices of the Peace Act 1949 (12, 13 & 14 Geo. 6. c. 101))
Medical Officers Superannuation Act (Ireland) 1869 or the Medical Officers Superannuation (Ireland) Act 1869	32 & 33 Vict. c. 50	2 August 1869
An Act to provide for Superannuation Allowances to Medical Officers of poor law unions, and of dispensary districts of such unions, in Ireland.
County Courts Admiralty Jurisdiction Amendment Act 1869 (repealed)	32 & 33 Vict. c. 51	2 August 1869
An Act to amend The County Courts (Admiralty Jurisdiction) Act, 1868, (Note: County Courts (Admiralty Jurisdiction) Act 1868 (31 & 32 Vict. c. 71)) and to give Jurisdiction in certain Maritime Causes. (Repealed by County Courts Act 1934 (24 & 25 Geo. 5. c. 53))
Shipping Dues Exemption Act Amendment Act 1869 (repealed)	32 & 33 Vict. c. 52	2 August 1869
An Act for the Amendment of The Shipping Dues Exemption Act, 1867. (Note: Shipping Dues Exemption Act 1867 (30 & 31 Vict. c. 15)) (Repealed by Shipping Dues Exemption Act 1870 (33 & 34 Vict. c. 50))
Cinque Ports Act 1869 (repealed)	32 & 33 Vict. c. 53	2 August 1869
An Act to amend The Cinque Ports Act. (Note: Cinque Ports Act 1855 (18 & 19 Vict. c. 48)) (Repealed by Justices of the Peace Act 1949 (12, 13 & 14 Geo. 6. c. 101))
Poor Relief (Ireland) Act 1869 (repealed)	32 & 33 Vict. c. 54	2 August 1869
An Act to amend the Act of the first and second years of Victoria, chapter fifty-six, intituled "An Act for the more effectual Relief of the destitute Poor in Ireland." (Note: Poor Relief (Ireland) Act 1838 (1 & 2 Vict. c. 56)) (Repealed by Statute Law Revision Act 1883 (46 & 47 Vict. c. 39), Statute Law Revision (No. 2) Act 1893 (56 & 57 Vict. c. 54), Welfare Services Act (Northern Ireland) 1949 (c. 1 (N.I.)) and Children and Young Persons Act (Northern Ireland) 1950 (c. 5 (N.I.)))
Municipal Corporation (Elections) Act 1869 or the Municipal Corporation (Election) Act 1869 or the Municipal Franchise Act 1869 (repealed)	32 & 33 Vict. c. 55	2 August 1869
An Act to shorten the Term of Residence required as a Qualification for the Municipal Franchise, and to make provision for other purposes. (Repealed by Municipal Corporations Act 1882 (45 & 46 Vict. c. 50))
Endowed Schools Act 1869 (repealed)	32 & 33 Vict. c. 56	2 August 1869
An Act to amend the Law relating to Endowed Schools and other Educational Endowments in England, and otherwise to provide for the Advancement of Education. (Repealed by Education Act 1973 (c. 16))
Seamen's Clothing Act 1869 (repealed)	32 & 33 Vict. c. 57	2 August 1869
An Act to amend the Law relating to the Protection of Seamen's Clothing and Property. (Repealed by Theft Act 1968 (c. 60))
Public Schools Act 1869 (repealed)	32 & 33 Vict. c. 58	9 August 1869
An Act for amending The Public Schools Act, 1868. (Note: Public Schools Act 1868 (31 & 32 Vict. c. 118)) (Repealed by Statute Law (Repeals) Act 1998 (c. 43))
Savings Bank Investment Act 1869 (repealed)	32 & 33 Vict. c. 59	9 August 1869
An Act to amend the Laws relating to the Investments for Savings Banks and Post Office Savings Banks. (Repealed by Post Office Savings Bank Act 1954 (2 & 3 Eliz. 2. c. 62) and Trustee Savings Banks Act 1954 (2 & 3 Eliz. 2. c. 63))
Political Offices Pension Act 1869 (repealed)	32 & 33 Vict. c. 60	9 August 1869
An Act to alter and amend the Acts enabling Her Majesty to grant Pensions to persons having held certain high civil offices. (Repealed by Ministerial Salaries and Members' Pensions Act 1965 (c. 11))
Trades Unions Funds Protection Act or the Trades Union Funds Protection Act 1869 or the Trade Union Funds Protection Act 1869 or the Trade Unions Funds Protection Act 1869 (repealed)	32 & 33 Vict. c. 61	9 August 1869
An Act to protect the Funds of Trades Unions from Embezzlement and Misappropriation. (Repealed by Trade Union Act 1871 (34 & 35 Vict. c. 31) (Note: Incorrectly cited as "Trade Union, 1874" in the Chronological Table of the Statutes.))
Debtors Act 1869	32 & 33 Vict. c. 62	9 August 1869
An Act for the Abolition of Imprisonment for Debt, for the punishment of fraudulent debtors, and for other purposes.
Metropolitan Poor Amendment Act 1869 (repealed)	32 & 33 Vict. c. 63	9 August 1869
An Act to amend The Metropolitan Poor Act, 1867. (Note: Metropolitan Poor Act 1867 (30 & 31 Vict. c. 6)) (Repealed by Poor Law Act 1927 (17 & 18 Geo. 5. c. 14) and Local Government Act 1929 (19 & 20 Geo. 5. c. 17))
Land Tax Commissioners (Appointment) Act 1869 (repealed)	32 & 33 Vict. c. 64	9 August 1869
An Act to appoint additional Commissioners for executing the Acts for granting a Land Tax and other rates and taxes. (Repealed by Statute Law Revision Act 1950 (14 Geo. 6. c. 6))
Corrupt Practices, Dublin City Act 1869 (repealed)	32 & 33 Vict. c. 65	9 August 1869
An Act for appointing Commissioners to inquire into the existence of corrupt Practices amongst the Freemen Electors of the city of Dublin. (Repealed by Statute Law Revision Act 1883 (46 & 47 Vict. c. 39))
Militia Pay Act 1869 (repealed)	32 & 33 Vict. c. 66	9 August 1869
An Act to continue and amend an Act (Note: Militia Pay Act 1868 (31 & 32 Vict. c. 76)) to defray the charge of the Pay, Clothing, and contingent and other expenses of the Disembodied Militia in Great Britain and Ireland; to grant allowances in certain cases to Subaltern Officers, Adjutants, Paymasters, Quartermasters, Surgeons, Assistant Surgeons, and Surgeons Mates of the Militia; and to authorize the employment of the Non-commissioned Officers. (Repealed by Militia Act 1882 (45 & 46 Vict. c. 49))
Valuation (Metropolis) Act 1869 (repealed)	32 & 33 Vict. c. 67	9 August 1869
An Act to provide for Uniformity in the Assessment of Rateable Property in the Metropolis. (Repealed by London Government Act 1963 (c. 33))
Evidence Further Amendment Act 1869 or Denman's Act (repealed)	32 & 33 Vict. c. 68	9 August 1869
An Act for the further Amendment of the Law of Evidence. (Repealed for England and Wales by Statute Law (Repeals) Act 1978 (c. 45) and for Northern Ireland by Family Law (Miscellaneous Provisions) (Northern Ireland) Order 1984 (SI 1984/1984 (N.I. 14)))
Jamaica Loans Act 1869 (repealed)	32 & 33 Vict. c. 69	9 August 1869
An Act to provide for the better Liquidation of certain Loans raised under the guarantee of Her Majesty for the service of the colony of Jamaica. (Repealed by Statute Law Revision (No. 2) Act 1893 (56 & 57 Vict. c. 54) and Statute Law Revision Act 1950 (14 Geo. 6. c. 6))
Contagious Diseases (Animals) Act 1869 (repealed)	32 & 33 Vict. c. 70	9 August 1869
An Act to consolidate, amend, and make perpetual the Acts for preventing the introduction or spreading of Contagious or Infectious Diseases among Cattle and other Animals in Great Britain. (Repealed by Statute Law (Repeals) Act 1975 (c. 10))
Bankruptcy Act 1869 (repealed)	32 & 33 Vict. c. 71	9 August 1869
An Act to consolidate and amend the Law of Bankruptcy. (Repealed for England and Wales by Bankruptcy Act 1883 (46 & 47 Vict. c. 52) and for the Isle of Man by Statute Law Revision (Isle of Man) Act 1991 (c. 61))
Drainage and Improvement of Lands Amendment Act, Ireland 1869 or the Drainage and Improvement of Lands Amendment (Ireland) Act 1869 (repealed)	32 & 33 Vict. c. 72	9 August 1869
An Act to amend The Drainage and Improvement of Lands (Ireland) Act, 1863, (Note: Drainage and Improvement of Lands (Ireland) Act 1863 (26 & 27 Vict. c. 88)) and to afford further facilities for the purposes thereof. (Repealed by Erne Drainage and Development Act (Northern Ireland) 1950 (c. 15 (N.I.)))
Telegraph Act 1869 (repealed)	32 & 33 Vict. c. 73	9 August 1869
An Act to alter and amend The Telegraph Act, 1868. (Note: Telegraph Act 1868 (31 & 32 Vict. c. 110)) (Repealed by Post Office Act 1969 (c. 48))
Public Works (Ireland) Act 1869	32 & 33 Vict. c. 74	9 August 1869
An Act to extend the period for the Repayment of Advances of Public Money for the construction of certain Public Works in Ireland, and also to incorporate the Commissioners of Public Works in Ireland for certain purposes, and to vest in the said Commissioners lands and premises held on public trusts.
Slave Trade Jurisdiction (Zanzibar) Act 1869 (repealed)	32 & 33 Vict. c. 75	9 August 1869
An Act to regulate and extend the Jurisdiction of Her Majesty's Consul at Zanzibar in regard to vessels captured on suspicion of being engaged in the Slave Trade, and for other purposes relating thereto. (Repealed by Slave Trade (East African Courts) Act 1873 (36 & 37 Vict. c. 59))
Fortifications (Expenses) Act 1869 (repealed)	32 & 33 Vict. c. 76	9 August 1869
An Act for providing the final sum necessary to be raised by loan towards carrying on the works now in course of construction for the protection of the Royal Arsenals and Dockyards and the Harbours of Dover and Portland, and for authorizing the abandonment of that portion of the works already sanctioned by Parliament which has not been yet commenced. (Repealed by Revenue, Friendly Societies, and National Debt Act 1882 (45 & 46 Vict. c. 72))
Basses Lights Act 1869 (repealed)	32 & 33 Vict. c. 77	9 August 1869
An Act for making better provision for the erection of a Lighthouse on the Great Basses Rock in the Colony of Ceylon, and for other purposes connected therewith. (Repealed by Statute Law Revision (No. 2) Act 1893 (56 & 57 Vict. c. 54))
Criminal Lunatics Act 1869 (repealed)	32 & 33 Vict. c. 78	9 August 1869
An Act to amend the Law relating to Criminal Lunatics. (Repealed by Criminal Lunatics Act 1884 (47 & 48 Vict. c. 64))
Local Officers Superannuation Act (Ireland) 1869 or the Local Officers Superannuation (Ireland) Act 1869	32 & 33 Vict. c. 79	9 August 1869
An Act to enable Corporate and other Public Bodies in Ireland to grant Superannuation Allowances to Officers in their Service in certain cases.
Militia (Ireland) Act 1869 (repealed)	32 & 33 Vict. c. 80	9 August 1869
An Act to amend The Militia (Ireland) Act, 1854, (Note: Militia (Ireland) Act 1854 (17 & 18 Vict. c. 107)) as to providing houses or places for the keeping of the arms, accoutrements, clothing, or other stores of the Militia when not embodied. (Repealed by Territorial Army and Militia Act 1921 (11 & 12 Geo. 5. c. 37))
Volunteer Act 1869 (repealed)	32 & 33 Vict. c. 81	9 August 1869
An Act to amend The Volunteer Act, 1863. (Note: Volunteer Act 1863 (26 & 27 Vict. c. 65)) (Repealed by Statute Law Revision Act 1966 (c. 5))
Metropolitan Building Act 1869 (repealed)	32 & 33 Vict. c. 82	9 August 1869
An Act to amend The Metropolitan Building Act, 1855. (Note: Metropolitan Building Act 1855 (18 & 19 Vict. c. 122)) (Repealed by London Building Act 1894 (57 & 58 Vict. c. ccxiii))
Bankruptcy Repeal and Insolvent Court Act 1869 (repealed)	32 & 33 Vict. c. 83	9 August 1869
An Act to provide for the winding-up of the business of the late Court for the Relief of Insolvent Debtors in England, and to repeal Enactments relating to Insolvency, Bankruptcy, Imprisonment for Debt, and matters connected therewith. (Repealed by Statute Law Revision (No. 2) Act 1893 (56 & 57 Vict. c. 54))
Durham Chancery Act 1869 (repealed)	32 & 33 Vict. c. 84	9 August 1869
An Act to abolish the office of Cursitor of the Court of Chancery in the palatine of Durham. (Repealed by Statute Law Revision Act 1950 (14 Geo. 6. c. 6))
Expiring Laws Continuance Act 1869 (repealed)	32 & 33 Vict. c. 85	9 August 1869
An Act to continue various expiring Laws. (Repealed by Statute Law Revision Act 1883 (46 & 47 Vict. c. 39))
Parliamentary Returns Act 1869	32 & 33 Vict. c. 86	9 August 1869
An Act to amend the Law relating to the Presentation of Accounts, Statements, Returns, and Documents to Parliament.
Prevention of Gaming (Scotland) Act 1869 (repealed)	32 & 33 Vict. c. 87	9 August 1869
An Act to provide for the prevention of Gaming in public places in Scotland. (Repealed by Betting and Gaming Act 1960 (8 & 9 Eliz. 2. c. 60))
Straits Settlements (Ecclesiastical) Act 1869 (repealed)	32 & 33 Vict. c. 88	9 August 1869
An Act for the separation of the Straits Settlements from the Diocese of Calcutta. (Repealed by Statute Law Revision (No. 2) Act 1893 (56 & 57 Vict. c. 54))
Clerks of Assize, &c. Act 1869 (repealed)	32 & 33 Vict. c. 89	9 August 1869
An Act to amend the Law relating to the office of Clerk of Assize and offices united thereto, and to certain Fees upon Orders for payment of witnesses in criminal proceedings. (Repealed by Supreme Court of Judicature (Consolidation) Act 1925 (15 & 16 Geo. 5. c. 49))
Annual Turnpike Acts Continuance Act 1869 (repealed)	32 & 33 Vict. c. 90	9 August 1869
An Act to continue certain Turnpike Acts in Great Britain, to repeal certain other Turnpike Acts, and to make further Provisions concerning Turnpike Roads. (Repealed by Statute Law (Repeals) Act 1981 (c. 19))
Courts of Justice (Salaries and Funds) Act 1869 (repealed)	32 & 33 Vict. c. 91	9 August 1869
An Act for amending the Law relating to the Salaries, Expenses, and Funds of Courts of Law in England. (Repealed by Court of Chancery (Funds) Act 1872 (35 & 36 Vict. c. 44), Supreme Court of Judicature (Officers) Act 1879 (42 & 43 Vict. c. 78), Statute Law Revision Act 1883 (46 & 47 Vict. c. 39), Statute Law Revision (No. 2) Act 1893 (56 & 57 Vict. c. 54), Administration of Justice Act 1925 (15 & 16 Geo. 5. c. 28), Statute Law Revision Act 1963 (c. 30) and Insolvency Services (Accounting and Investment) Act 1970 (c. 8))
Fisheries (Ireland) Act 1869 (repealed)	32 & 33 Vict. c. 92	9 August 1869
An Act to amend the Laws relating to the Fisheries of Ireland. (Repealed by Fisheries Act (Northern Ireland) 1966 (c. 17 (N.I.)))
Appropriation Act 1869 (repealed)	32 & 33 Vict. c. 93	11 August 1869
An Act to apply a sum out of the Consolidated Fund and the Surplus of Ways and Means to the service of the year ending the thirty-first day of March one thousand eight hundred and seventy, and to appropriate the Supplies granted in this Session of Parliament. (Repealed by Statute Law Revision Act 1883 (46 & 47 Vict. c. 39))
New Parishes Acts and Church Building Acts Amendment Act 1869	32 & 33 Vict. c. 94	11 August 1869
An Act to amend the New Parishes Acts and Church Buildings Acts.
Millbank Prison Act 1869 (repealed)	32 & 33 Vict. c. 95	11 August 1869
An Act to enable Military Offenders to be confined in Millbank Prison. (Repealed by Millbank Prison Act 1892 (55 & 56 Vict. c. 1))
Contagious Diseases Act 1869 (repealed)	32 & 33 Vict. c. 96	11 August 1869
An Act to amend The Contagious Diseases Act, 1866. (Note: Contagious Diseases Act 1866 (29 & 30 Vict. c. 35)) (Repealed by Contagious Diseases Acts Repeal Act 1886 (49 & 50 Vict. c. 10))
Government of India Act 1869 (repealed)	32 & 33 Vict. c. 97	11 August 1869
An Act to amend in certain respects the Act (Note: Government of India Act 1858 (21 & 22 Vict. c. 106)) for the better Government of India. (Repealed by Government of India Act 1915 (5 & 6 Geo. 5. c. 61))
Indian Councils Act 1869 (repealed)	32 & 33 Vict. c. 98	11 August 1869
An Act to define the powers of the Governor General of India in Council at meetings for making laws and regulations for certain purposes. (Repealed by Government of India Act 1915 (5 & 6 Geo. 5. c. 61))
Habitual Criminals Act 1869 (repealed)	32 & 33 Vict. c. 99	11 August 1869
An Act for the more effectual Prevention of Crime. (Repealed by Prevention of Crimes Act 1871 (34 & 35 Vict. c. 112))
Sanitary Loans Act 1869 (repealed)	32 & 33 Vict. c. 100	11 August 1869
An Act to facilitate the borrowing money in certain cases for the purpose of The Sanitary Act, 1866, (Note: Sanitary Act 1866 (29 & 30 Vict. c. 90)) and the Acts amending the same; and for other purposes. (Repealed for England and Wales by Public Health Act 1875 (38 & 39 Vict. c. 55), for Ireland by Public Health (Ireland) Act 1878 (41 & 42 Vict. c. 52) and for London by Public Health (London) Act 1891 (54 & 55 Vict. c. 76))
Canada (Rupert's Land) Loan Act 1869 (repealed)	32 & 33 Vict. c. 101	11 August 1869
An Act for authorizing a guarantee of a loan to be raised by Canada for a payment in respect of the transfer of Rupert's Land. (Repealed by Statute Law Revision Act 1950 (14 Geo. 6. c. 6))
Metropolitan Board of Works (Loans) Act 1869 (repealed)	32 & 33 Vict. c. 102	11 August 1869
An Act for making further provision respecting the borrowing of Money by the Metropolitan Board of Works, and for other purposes connected therewith. (Repealed by London County Council (Finance Consolidation) Act 1912 (2 & 3 Geo. 5. c. cv) (Note: Incorrectly cited as "2-3 G 5 c v" in the Chronological Table of the Statutes.))
Customs and Excise Warehousing Act 1869 (repealed)	32 & 33 Vict. c. 103	11 August 1869
An Act to amend the Law relating to the Warehousing of Wines and Spirits in Customs and Excise Warehouses, and for other purposes relating to Customs and Inland Revenue. (Repealed by Statute Law Revision Act 1883 (46 & 47 Vict. c. 39) and Finance Act 1905 (5 Edw. 7. c. 4))
Dividends and Stock Act 1869 (repealed)	32 & 33 Vict. c. 104	11 August 1869
An Act for facilitating the Payment of Dividends on the Public Stocks, and for making regulations with respect thereto. (Repealed by Statute Law Revision Act 1870 (33 & 34 Vict. c. 69))
Harbour of Galle Loan Act 1869 (repealed)	32 & 33 Vict. c. 105	11 August 1869
An Act for empowering the Public Works Loan Commissioners to advance a sum not exceeding two hundred and fifty thousand pounds for the improvement of the harbour of Galle in the colony of Ceylon. (Repealed by Harbour of Colombo Loan Act 1874 (37 & 38 Vict. c. 24))
East India Loan Act 1869 (repealed)	32 & 33 Vict. c. 106	11 August 1869
An Act to enable the Secretary of State in Council of India to raise Money in the United Kingdom for the Service of the Government of India. (Repealed by East India Loans Act 1937 (1 Edw. 8 & 1 Geo. 6. c. 14))
Metropolitan Commons Amendment Act 1869	32 & 33 Vict. c. 107	11 August 1869
An Act to amend the Metropolitan Commons Act, 1866. (Note: Metropolitan Commons Act 1866 (29 & 30 Vict. c. 122))
Sanitary Act 1866 Amendment Act 1869 (repealed)	32 & 33 Vict. c. 108	11 August 1869
An Act to amend The Sanitary Act, 1866, so far as the same relates to Ireland. (Repealed by Statute Law Revision Act 1883 (46 & 47 Vict. c. 39))
Residence of Incumbents Act 1869 (repealed)	32 & 33 Vict. c. 109	11 August 1869
An Act for repealing part of an Act of the first year of the reign of their Majesties King William and Queen Mary, intituled "An Act to vest in the two Universities the presentations of benefices belonging to Papists," (Note: Presentation of Benefices Act 1688 (1 Will. & Mar. c. 26)) and for securing uniformity in the law relating to the residence of spiritual persons upon their benefices, and to the penalties and forfeitures consequent on non-residence. (Repealed by Statute Law (Repeals) Measure 2018 (No. 1))
Charitable Trusts Act 1869 (repealed)	32 & 33 Vict. c. 110	11 August 1869
An Act for amending the Charitable Trusts Acts. (Repealed by Charities Act 1960 (8 & 9 Eliz. 2. c. 58))
Bishops Resignation Act 1869 (repealed)	32 & 33 Vict. c. 111	11 August 1869
An Act for the relief of Archbishops and Bishops when incapacitated by infirmity. (Repealed by Bishops (Retirement) Measure 1951 (No. 2))
Adulteration of Seeds Act 1869 (repealed)	32 & 33 Vict. c. 112	11 August 1869
An Act to prevent the Adulteration of Seeds. (Repealed by Plant Varieties and Seeds Act 1964 (c. 14))
Nitro Glycerine Act 1869 (repealed)	32 & 33 Vict. c. 113	11 August 1869
An Act to prohibit for a limited period the importation, and to restrict and regulate the carriage, of Nitro Glycerine. (Repealed by Explosives Act 1875 (38 & 39 Vict. c. 17))
Abandonment of Railways Act 1869 (repealed)	32 & 33 Vict. c. 114	11 August 1869
An Act to amend the Law relating to the Abandonment of Railways and the Dissolution of Railway Companies. (Repealed for England and Wales and Scotland by Transport Act 1962 (10 & 11 Eliz. 2. c. 46) and for Northern Ireland by Road Traffic, Transport and Roads (Northern Ireland) Order 1984 (SI 1984/1986 (N.I. 15)))
Metropolitan Public Carriage Act 1869	32 & 33 Vict. c. 115	11 August 1869
An Act for amending the Law relating to Hackney and Stage Carriages within the Metropolitan Police District.
Titles to Land Consolidation (Scotland) Amendment Act 1869 (repealed)	32 & 33 Vict. c. 116	11 August 1869
An Act to amend the Titles to Land Consolidation (Scotland) Act, 1868. (Note: Titles to Land Consolidation (Scotland) Act 1868 (31 & 32 Vict. c. 101)) (Repealed by Abolition of Feudal Tenure etc. (Scotland) Act 2000 (asp 5))
Pharmacy Act 1869 (repealed)	32 & 33 Vict. c. 117	11 August 1869
An Act to amend The Pharmacy Act, 1868. (Note: Pharmacy Act 1868 (31 & 32 Vict. c. 121)) (Repealed by Pharmacy and Poisons Act 1933 (23 & 24 Geo. 5. c. 25))

=== Local acts ===
Short title	Citation	Royal assent
Long title
West Middlesex Waterworks Act 1869	32 & 33 Vict. c. i	13 May 1869
An Act to enable the Company of Proprietors of the West Middlesex Waterworks to raise a further sum of money; and for other purposes.
Brymbo Water Act 1869	32 & 33 Vict. c. ii	13 May 1869
An Act for better supplying with Water Brymbo and places adjacent in the county of Denbigh.
London Necropolis and National Mausoleum Act 1869 or the London Necropolis and National Mausoleum Amendment Act 1869	32 & 33 Vict. c. iii	13 May 1869
An Act to amend the Acts relating to the London Necropolis and National Mausoleum Company; and for other purposes.
Lambeth Waterworks Act 1869	32 & 33 Vict. c. iv	13 May 1869
An Act to authorize the Company of Proprietors of Lambeth Waterworks to raise further Money; and for other purposes.
Wainfleet and Firsby Railway Act 1869	32 & 33 Vict. c. v	13 May 1869
An Act for making a Railway from the East Lincolnshire line of the Great Northern Railway at Firsby to the town of Wainfleet All Saints, in the parts of Lindsey in the county of Lincoln; and for other purposes.
Crystal Palace Company's Leasing Act 1869 (repealed)	32 & 33 Vict. c. vi	13 May 1869
An Act to enable the Crystal Palace Company to grant leases of certain portions of their land. (Repealed by London County Council (Crystal Palace) Act 1951 (14 & 15 Geo. 6. c. xxviii))
Rock Life Assurance Act 1869	32 & 33 Vict. c. vii	13 May 1869
An Act to alter and enlarge some of the powers of the Rock life Assurance Company, and for other purposes.
Parish of St. Giles, Cripplegate Vestry Act 1869	32 & 33 Vict. c. viii	13 May 1869
An Act for altering the vestry of the parish of Saint Giles Without Cripplegate within the liberties of the city of London, and for other purposes.
Redheugh Bridge Act 1869 (repealed)	32 & 33 Vict. c. ix	13 May 1869
An Act to amend The Redheugh Bridge Act, 1866. (Note: Redheugh Bridge Act 1866 (29 & 30 Vict. c. lxiii)) (Repealed by Tyne and Wear Act 1976 (c. xxxvi))
Grimsby Improvement Act 1869 (repealed)	32 & 33 Vict. c. x	13 May 1869
An Act to confer powers upon the Corporation of Grimsby as to the West Marshes, and the construction of a bridge over the Old Dock, and of other works at Grimsby; and for other purposes. (Repealed by Humberside Act 1982 (c. iii))
Leeds Improvement Act 1869 (repealed)	32 & 33 Vict. c. xi	13 May 1869
An Act to authorize the Mayor, Aldermen, and Burgesses of the borough of Leeds to improve the streets and becks, and to make other improvements in the said borough; and for other purposes. (Repealed by West Yorkshire Act 1980 (c. xiv))
Great Tower Hill Act 1869 (repealed)	32 & 33 Vict. c. xii	13 May 1869
An Act for making better provision for the repair and improvement of Great Tower Hill; and for other purposes. (Repealed by Borough of Stepney (Tower of London) Scheme 1901 (SR&O 1901/540))
Dublin and Meath Railway (Working Agreement) Act 1869	32 & 33 Vict. c. xiii	13 May 1869
An Act to confirm a Working Agreement between the Dublin and Meath Railway Company and the Midland Great Western Railway of Ireland Company; and for other purposes.
Workington Harbour (Transfer) Act 1869 (repealed)	32 & 33 Vict. c. xiv	13 May 1869
An Act to transfer the Harbour of Workington from the trustees thereof to the Right Honourable William Earl of Lonsdale; to authorize the improvement and extension of that harbour; and for other purposes. (Repealed by Workington Harbour and Dock (Transfer) Act 1957 (5 & 6 Eliz. 2. c. xxxii))
Ilkley Gas Act 1869	32 & 33 Vict. c. xv	13 May 1869
An Act for dissolving the Ilkley Gas Company (Limited) and re-incorporating the proprietors therein with others, and to give them further powers for supplying gas to Ilkley and the neighbourhood in the West Riding of the county of York; and for other purposes.
Imperial Fire Insurance Act 1869	32 & 33 Vict. c. xvi	13 May 1869
An Act to subdivide the shares of the Imperial (Fire) Insurance Company, and for other purposes with respect to the future management of the same Company.
Harrogate Waterworks Act 1869 (repealed)	32 & 33 Vict. c. xvii	13 May 1869
An Act to sanction certain proceedings of the Harrogate Waterworks Company with reference to the construction of works and the raising of money, and to empower them to construct additional works and to raise further money; and for other purposes. (Repealed by Harrogate Corporation (Waterworks Transfer) Act 1897 (60 & 61 Vict. c. ccxxxvii))
South Devon Railway Act 1869	32 & 33 Vict. c. xviii	13 May 1869
An Act to consolidate, define, and regulate the capital of the South Devon Railway Company; and for other purposes.
Kew and Other Bridges Act 1869	32 & 33 Vict. c. xix	24 June 1869
An Act for making provision for the execution of The London Coal and Wine Duties Continuance Act, 1868, (Note: London Coal and Wine Duties Continuance Act 1868 (31 & 32 Vict. c. 17)) as far as it relates to the freeing from Toll of the following Bridges on the Thames; namely, Kew, Kingston-upon-Thames, Hampton Court, Walton-upon-Thames, and Staines; and Chingford Bridge and Tottenham Mills Bridges on the Lee; and for other purposes.
Holborn Valley Improvement (Money) Act 1869 (repealed)	32 & 33 Vict. c. xx	24 June 1869
An Act for authorizing the Mayor and Commonalty and Citizens of the City of London to raise a further sum of Money for the completion of the Holborn Valley Viaduct, and the streets and works connected therewith. (Repealed by City of London (Various Powers) Act 1969 (c. xxxix))
Fermoy and Lismore Railway Act 1869	32 & 33 Vict. c. xxi	24 June 1869
An Act for making a railway from the Great Southern and Western Railway in the parish of Fermoy in the county of Cork to Lismore in the county of Waterford; and for other purposes.
West Ham Gas Company's Act 1869	32 & 33 Vict. c. xxii	24 June 1869
An Act to enable the West Ham Gas Company to increase their Capital, and for other purposes with respect to the same Company.
University College (London) Act 1869	32 & 33 Vict. c. xxiii	24 June 1869
An Act to alter the constitution of University College, London, and for other purposes relating to the said College.
Edinburgh Parish Poorhouse Water Supply Act 1869 (repealed)	32 & 33 Vict. c. xxiv	24 June 1869
An Act to enable the Parochial Board of the Parish of Edinburgh, and the Trustees of the Estate of Craiglockhart for behoof of said board, to obtain from the Edinburgh Water Company a supply of Water for the New Poorhouse, and other buildings in connexion therewith, erected or to be erected on the lands of Craiglockhart. (Repealed by Edinburgh Corporation Order Confirmation Act 1958 (7 & 8 Eliz. 2. c. v))
Manchester, Sheffield and Lincolnshire Railway and Midland Railway Companies (Joint Lines) Act 1869	32 & 33 Vict. c. xxv	24 June 1869
An Act for dissolving the Manchester and Stockport Railway Company, and transferring their undertaking to the Manchester, Sheffield, and Lincolnshire and Midland Railway Companies jointly; and for empowering the two last-mentioned companies jointly to make a short branch railway out of the Stockport and Woodley Junction Railway; and for authorizing a joint ownership by those two companies of the Newton and Compstall Railway and the Marple New Mills and Hayfield Junction Railway; and for granting running powers to the Midland Railway Company over parts of the Manchester, Sheffield, and Lincolnshire Railway; and for other purposes.
Manchester, Sheffield and Lincolnshire Railway (Additional Lands at Grimsby) Act 1869	32 & 33 Vict. c. xxvi	24 June 1869
An Act to enable the Manchester, Sheffield, and Lincolnshire Railway Company to acquire additional lands at Great Grimsby, in the county of Lincoln.
Melton Mowbray Cattle Market, &c. Act 1869	32 & 33 Vict. c. xxvii	24 June 1869
An Act for empowering the Local Board of Melton Mowbray, in the county of Leicester, to provide a Cattle Market; and for conferring other powers on the Local Board; and for other purposes.
Kent Coast Railway Act 1869	32 & 33 Vict. c. xxviii	24 June 1869
An Act to authorize the Kent Coast Railway Company to provide for the payment of their mortgages by means of redeemable debenture stock.
Enniskillen, Bundoran and Sligo Railway Act 1869	32 & 33 Vict. c. xxix	24 June 1869
An Act for effecting an Arrangement with respect to the mortgage and other Debts of the Enniskillen, Bundoran, and Sligo Railway Company; and for other purposes.
City of London Subways Act 1869	32 & 33 Vict. c. xxx	24 June 1869
An Act to make provision respecting the use of Subways under the management of the Commissioners of Sewers of the City of London and the liberties thereof; and for other purposes.
Great Yarmouth Waterworks Act 1869	32 & 33 Vict. c. xxxi	24 June 1869
An Act to authorize the Great Yarmouth Waterworks Company to raise more Money, and for the Prevention of Waste and Misuse of the Company's Water; and for other purposes.
Greenock Water Act 1869 (repealed)	32 & 33 Vict. c. xxxii	24 June 1869
An Act for authorizing the Water Trust of Greenock to raise further Money; and for amending the provisions of the Acts relating to the Trust; and for other purposes. (Repealed by Greenock Corporation Act 1909 (9 Edw. 7. c. cxxix))
Dumbarton Waterworks and Municipality Act 1869	32 & 33 Vict. c. xxxiii	24 June 1869
An Act for authorizing the Dumbarton Water Commissioners to make and maintain an additional storage reservoir and other works, and to give an increased supply of water; for dividing the Burgh of Dumbarton into wards; and for other purposes.
West Somerset Mineral Railway (Working Arrangements) Act 1869	32 & 33 Vict. c. xxxiv	24 June 1869
An Act to enable the West Somerset Mineral Railway Company to enter into a working agreement with and to grant a lease of their undertaking to the Ebbw Vale Steel, Iron, and Coal Company, limited; and for other purposes connected with their undertaking.
Hounslow and Metropolitan Railway (Extension of Time) Act 1869	32 & 33 Vict. c. xxxv	24 June 1869
An Act to extend the time for the purchase of lands and for the completion of the Hounslow and Metropolitan Railway.
Cleckheaton Gas Act 1869	32 & 33 Vict. c. xxxvi	24 June 1869
An Act for incorporating and granting further powers to the Cleckheaton Gas Company.
Radcliffe and Pilkington Gas Act 1869	32 & 33 Vict. c. xxxvii	24 June 1869
An Act to authorize "The Radcliffe and Pilkington Gas Company" to raise further monies by shares and by borrowing.
Consett Waterworks Act 1869	32 & 33 Vict. c. xxxviii	24 June 1869
An Act for enlarging the powers of the Consett Waterworks Company.
Waltham Abbey and Cheshunt Gas Act 1869	32 & 33 Vict. c. xxxix	24 June 1869
An Act for better supplying with Gas the parish of Waltham Holy Cross in the county of Essex and the parish of Cheshunt in the county of Hertford; and for other purposes.
King's Lynn Dock Act 1869	32 & 33 Vict. c. xl	24 June 1869
An Act to authorize the King's Lynn Docks and Railway Company to connect their undertaking with the railways at King's Lynn, to change the name of the company, and for other purposes with relation to the company.
Launceston and South Devon Railway Act 1869	32 & 33 Vict. c. xli	24 June 1869
An Act for altering and enlarging the powers of the Launceston and South Devon Railway Company for raising money, and for vesting their undertaking in the South Devon Railway Company; and for other purposes.
Shotley Bridge and Consett District Gas Act 1869	32 & 33 Vict. c. xlii	24 June 1869
An Act for incorporating the Shotley Bridge and Consett District Gas Company; for enabling them to supply gas to parts of the parishes of Lanchester in the county of Durham, and Shotley in the county of Northumberland; and for other purposes.
Darwen Waterworks Act 1869	32 & 33 Vict. c. xliii	24 June 1869
An Act for dissolving and re-incorporating the Darwen Waterworks and Reservoirs Company, and for enabling them to execute additional works and raise further capital; and for other purposes.
Albert Bridge Act 1869 (repealed)	32 & 33 Vict. c. xliv	24 June 1869
An Act to extend the time limited for the completion of the Bridge and other works authorized by The Albert Bridge Act, 1864; (Note: Albert Bridge Act 1864 (27 & 28 Vict. c. ccxxxv)) and for other purposes. (Repealed by Local Law (Greater London Council and Inner London Boroughs) Order 1965 (SI 1965/540))
St. Martin-in-the-Fields Workhouse Fund Appropriation Act 1869	32 & 33 Vict. c. xlv	24 June 1869
An Act to provide for the disposition of the Workhouse Fund of the parish of Saint Martin-in-the-Fields in the county of Middlesex.
Dundee Water Act 1869 (repealed)	32 & 33 Vict. c. xlvi	24 June 1869
An Act to incorporate Commissioners, and to vest in them the undertaking of the Dundee Water Company; and for other purposes. (Repealed by Dundee Corporation (Water, Transport, Finance, &c.) Order Confirmation Act 1954 (2 & 3 Eliz. 2. c. ix))
Stony Stratford Railway Act 1869	32 & 33 Vict. c. xlvii	24 June 1869
An Act for making a Railway from Stony Stratford in the county of Buckingham to the Wolverton station of the London and North-western Railway Company; and for other purposes.
Glasgow and South Western Railway (Paisley Canal, &c.) Act 1869	32 & 33 Vict. c. xlviii	24 June 1869
An Act to vest the Glasgow, Paisley, and Johnstone Canal in the Glasgow and South-western Railway Company, and to enable that company to guarantee the payment of dividends upon a portion of the share capital of the Greenock and Ayrshire Railway Company; and for other purposes.
Windermere District Waterworks Act 1869	32 & 33 Vict. c. xlix	24 June 1869
An Act for supplying with water the townships of Undermillbeck, Applethwaite, and Troutbeck in the parish of Windermere in the county of Westmorland, and for conferring powers for that purpose on the Windermere District Gas Company; and for other purposes.
Bishop's Stortford Water Act 1869 (repealed)	32 & 33 Vict. c. l	24 June 1869
An Act for supplying Bishops Stortford in the county of Hertford with water. (Repealed by Herts and Essex Water (No. 2) Order 1958 (SI 1958/1622))
Bridgend (Glamorgan) Gas and Water Act 1869	32 & 33 Vict. c. li	24 June 1869
An Act for better supplying with Gas and Water the town of Bridgend and neighbourhood in the county of Glamorgan, and for other purposes.
Midland Great Western Railway (of Ireland) Act 1869 (repealed)	32 & 33 Vict. c. lii	24 June 1869
An Act to enable the Midland Great Western Railway (of Ireland) Company to raise further monies by borrowing. (Repealed by Statute Law (Repeals) Act 2013 (c. 2))
South Western Railway (North Devon Extension of Time) Act 1869	32 & 33 Vict. c. liii	24 June 1869
An Act for extending the time for the compulsory purchase of lands for, and for the completion of the authorized Railway of the London and South-western Railway Company from Bideford to Great Torrington.
Accrington Gas and Waterworks Act 1869	32 & 33 Vict. c. liv	24 June 1869
An Act to alter and extend the powers of the Accrington Gas and Waterworks Company in relation to their Waterworks; and for other purposes.
Spalding Waterworks Act 1869	32 & 33 Vict. c. lv	24 June 1869
An Act to enable the Spalding Waterworks Company to extend their works; and for other purposes with relation to the same company.
Lymington Harbour and Docks (Extension of Time) Act 1869	32 & 33 Vict. c. lvi	24 June 1869
An Act to extend the time for the purchase of lands and for the construction of the works authorized by The Lymington Harbour and Docks Act, 1864. (Note: Lymington Harbour and Docks Act 1864 (27 & 28 Vict. c. cxx))
Medway Docks (Extension of Time) Act 1869	32 & 33 Vict. c. lvii	24 June 1869
An Act to extend the time for the purchase of lands and for the construction of the works authorized by The Medway Docks Act, 1866. (Note: Medway Docks Act 1866 (29 & 30 Vict. c. ccxxix))
Glasgow Corporation Gas Act 1869	32 & 33 Vict. c. lviii	24 June 1869
An Act to transfer to and vest in the Corporation of Glasgow the undertakings of the Glasgow Gaslight Company and the City and Suburban Gas Company of Glasgow, and for other purposes.
Metropolitan Commons Supplemental Act 1869	32 & 33 Vict. c. lix	24 June 1869
An Act to confirm a scheme under The Metropolitan Commons Act, 1866. (Note: Metropolitan Commons Act 1866 (29 & 30 Vict. c. 122))
	Hayes Common Scheme.	
Drainage and Improvement of Lands Supplemental Act (Ireland) 1869 (Note: The same short title was assigned to both 32 & 33 Vict. c. lx and 32 & 33 Vict. c. cxlix.) or the Drainage and Improvement of Lands Supplemental (Ireland) Act 1869	32 & 33 Vict. c. lx	24 June 1869
An Act to confirm a Provisional Order under The Drainage and Improvement of Lands (Ireland) Act, 1863, (Note: Drainage and Improvement of Lands (Ireland) Act 1863 (26 & 27 Vict. c. 88)) and the Acts amending the same.
	Doohyle Drainage District Order 1869 Drainage and Improvement of Lands (Ireland) Provisional Order Confirmation.	
Llynvi and Ogmore Railway Act 1869	32 & 33 Vict. c. lxi	24 June 1869
An Act for abandonment of the extension railways authorized by The Llynvi Valley Railway Act, 1866, (Note: Llynvi Valley Railway Act 1866 (29 & 30 Vict. c. cxvii)) and for extension of the times limited for purchase of lands and completion of works under that Act and The Ogmore Valley Railways Act, 1866, (Note: Ogmore Valley Railways Act 1866 (29 & 30 Vict. c. cclii)) and for making better provision for application of capital and payment of debts of the Llynvi and Ogmore Railway Company; and for other purposes.
Metropolitan District Railway Act 1869	32 & 33 Vict. c. lxii	24 June 1869
An Act to grant further powers to the Metropolitan District Railway Company.
Bristol Harbour Railway Act 1869	32 & 33 Vict. c. lxiii	24 June 1869
An Act to confer further powers upon the Great Western and the Bristol and Exeter Railway Companies with respect to the Bristol Harbour Railway and Depôt, and for other purposes.
Barnstaple Gas Act 1869	32 & 33 Vict. c. lxiv	24 June 1869
An Act to incorporate a Company to be called "The Barnstaple Gas Company;" to provide for the lighting of the town and parish of Barnstaple and adjoining places; and for other purposes.
Cricksea Bridge Act 1869	32 & 33 Vict. c. lxv	24 June 1869
An Act to authorize the construction of a bridge over the river Crouch in Essex, to be called "The Cricksea Bridge."
Oswaldtwistle Local Board Act 1869	32 & 33 Vict. c. lxvi	24 June 1869
An Act to authorize the Local Board of Oswaldtwistle, in the parish of Whalley, in the county of Lancaster to make and supply Gas, and to confer various powers upon the said Local Board in reference to gas, water, and street improvements; and for other purposes.
Bishopsgate (All Saints District Discontinuance) Act 1869	32 & 33 Vict. c. lxvii	24 June 1869
An Act for discontinuing the Chapelry District or new Parish of All Saints, Bishopsgate, in the city of London, as a separate district; for authorizing the appropriation of certain land in that district (provided by the Great Eastern Railway Company for a new Church in substitution of the existing Church), as sites for a Curate's Residence for the parish of Saint Botolph Without, Bishopsgate, and for Schools in lieu of the present Bishopsgate Ward Schools, and for a School Chapel; and for the regulation and management of such new Schools and School Chapel, and for authorizing certain monies to be applied in building the same; and for other purposes.
Pontefract Park Trustees and Street Commissioners Act 1869	32 & 33 Vict. c. lxviii	24 June 1869
An Act for conferring further powers upon the Pontefract Park Trustees and the Pontefract Street Commissioners respectively.
Harrow, Edgware and London Railway Act 1869 (repealed)	32 & 33 Vict. c. lxix	12 July 1869
An Act to extend the Edgware, Highgate, and London Railway to Harrow. (Repealed by Harrow, Edgware and London Railway (Abandonment) Act 1874 (37 & 38 Vict. c. cvi))
Oyster and Mussel Fisheries Orders Confirmation Act 1869 (repealed)	32 & 33 Vict. c. lxx	12 July 1869
An Act to confirm certain Orders made by the Board of Trade under The Sea Fisheries Act, 1868, (Note: Sea Fisheries Act 1868 (31 & 32 Vict. c. 45)) relating to Donibristle (Firth of Forth), and the Holy Loch (Firth of Clyde). (Repealed by Statute Law (Repeals) Act 1998 (c. 43))
	Donibristle Fisher Order 1869 Order for the establishment and maintenance by the Right Honourable Archibald George Earl of Moray of a Several or Exclusive Oyster Fishery at Donibristle in the estuary of the Firth of Forth in the county of Fife.	
	Holy Loch Fishery Order 1869 Order for the Establishment and Maintenance by James Hunter, Esquire, of Hafton, of a Several Oyster and Mussel Fishery at Ardnadam, in the Holy Loch, Firth of Clyde, in the county of Argyll.	
Pier and Harbour Orders Confirmation Act 1869	32 & 33 Vict. c. lxxi	12 July 1869
An Act for confirming certain Provisional Orders made by the Board of Trade under The General Pier and Harbour Act, 1861, (Note: General Pier and Harbour Act 1861 (24 & 25 Vict. c. 45)) relating to CliflonviUe, Gillingham, Rosslare, Saint Just, Fowey, and Padstow.
	Cliftonville Pier Order 1869 Order for the construction, maintenance, and regulation of a Pier at Cliftonville, in the parish of Hove, in the county of Sussex.	
	Gillingham Pier Order 1869 Order for the maintenance and regulation of a Pier, Wharf, and Landing Place in the parish of Gillingham in the county of Kent.	
	Rosslare Harbour Order 1869 Order for the construction, maintenance, and regulation of a Pier and Harbour at Rosslare, in Greenore Bay, in the county of Wexford.	
	Saint Just Harbour and Pier Order 1869 Order for the construction, maintenance, and regulation of a Harbour and Pier at Saint Just, in the county of Cornwall.	
	Fowey Harbour Order 1869 Order for the management and improvement of the Harbour of Fowey, in the county of Cornwall.	
	Padstow Harbour Improvement Order 1869 Order for the improvement and further regulation of the Harbour of Padstow in the County of Cornwall.	
London, Brighton and South Coast and Surrey and Sussex Junction Railway Companies' Amalgamation Act 1869	32 & 33 Vict. c. lxxii	12 July 1869
An Act for the amalgamation of the Surrey and Sussex Junction Railway Company with the London, Brighton, and South Coast Railway Company; and for other purposes.
Porthleven Harbour Act 1869	32 & 33 Vict. c. lxxiii	12 July 1869
An Act for the better regulation of the Harbour of Porthleven in Mount's Bay in the county of Cornwall, and lor other purposes.
Stockton-on-Tees Extension and Improvement Act 1869 (repealed)	32 & 33 Vict. c. lxxiv	12 July 1869
An Act for extending the boundaries of the Borough of Stockton, and for consolidating and amending the Acts in force in the Borough in relation to the management and improvement of Streets, and to Sewerage, and to Buildings, and to Police and other matters of local government; and for other purposes. (Repealed by Teesside Corporation (General Powers) Act 1971 (c. xv))
Buckfastleigh, Totnes and South Devon Railway Act 1869	32 & 33 Vict. c. lxxv	12 July 1869
An Act for conferring further power on the Buckfastleigh, Totnes, and South Devon Railway Company with reference to their authorized capital.
Llanelly Railway and Dock Company's Act 1869	32 & 33 Vict. c. lxxvi	12 July 1869
An Act to enlarge the powers of the Llanelly Railway and Dock Company, and for other purposes.
St. James Chapel Act 1869 (repealed)	32 & 33 Vict. c. lxxvii	12 July 1869
An Act to authorize the sale of Saint James' Chapel, Hampstead Road, and the utilization of the residue of the property adjoining thereto, for the benefit of the parish of Saint James', Westminster; and for other purposes. (Repealed by London Government (City of Westminster) Order in Council 1901 (SR&O 1901/278))
Lancashire and Yorkshire Railway (Extension of Time, &c.) Act 1869	32 & 33 Vict. c. lxxviii	12 July 1869
An Act to extend the time for the purchase of lands for and for the construction of certain branch railways authorized by the Lancashire and Yorkshire Railway (West Riding Branches, &c.) Act, 1866; (Note: Lancashire and Yorkshire Railway (West Riding Branches, &c.) Act 1866 (29 & 30 Vict. c. lxxi)) to authorize the abandonment of a junction railway authorized by that Act; to confer further powers on the Lancashire and Yorkshire Railway and the London and North-western Railway Companies with respect to certain undertakings vested in them jointly; and for other purposes.
Ross Improvement Act (Amendment Act) 1869 (repealed)	32 & 33 Vict. c. lxxix	12 July 1869
An Act to amend The Ross Improvement Act, 1865. (Note: Ross Improvement Act 1865 (28 & 29 Vict. c. cviii)) (Repealed by Statute Law (Repeals) Act 1998 (c. 43))
Scinde Railway Company's Amalgamation Act 1869 (repealed)	32 & 33 Vict. c. lxxx	12 July 1869
An Act for authorising the Scinde Railway Company to amalgamate their several undertakings, and to make further agreements with the Secretary of State in Council of India; and for other purposes. (Repealed by Statute Law (Repeals) Act 2013 (c. 2))
City of Glasgow Union Railway Act 1869	32 & 33 Vict. c. lxxxi	12 July 1869
An Act to confer further powers on the City of Glasgow Union Railway Company, the Glasgow and Southwestern Railway Company, and the North British Railway Company.
Hartlepool Port and Harbour Act 1869	32 & 33 Vict. c. lxxxii	12 July 1869
An Act for amending The Hartlepool Port and Harbour Act, 1855; (Note: Hartlepool Port and Harbour Act 1855 (18 & 19 Vict. c. cxxvi)) for abandoning part of the works by that Act authorized; for the construction of other works; for the improvement and regulation of the Port and Harbour of Hartlepool; and for other purposes.
Midland Railway (Additional Powers) Act 1869	32 & 33 Vict. c. lxxxiii	12 July 1869
An Act for conferring additional powers on the Midland Railway Company for the construction of new works; for extending the periods for the purchase of certain lands and for the construction of certain authorized railways; and for other purposes.
Maryport Town and Harbour Gas Act 1869	32 & 33 Vict. c. lxxxiv	12 July 1869
An Act for dissolving and re-incorporating the Proprietors of "The Maryport Gaslight Company (Limited);" and for other purposes.
Clontarf Township Act 1869	32 & 33 Vict. c. lxxxv	12 July 1869
An Act for the formation and improvement of Clontarf Township, comprising the Districts of Clontarf, Dollymount, and Ballybough, in the Barony of Coolock and county of Dublin.
South Western Railway (General) Act 1869	32 & 33 Vict. c. lxxxvi	12 July 1869
An Act for conferring further powers upon and for amending the Acts relating to the London and Southwestern Railway Company.
Preston Improvement Act 1869	32 & 33 Vict. c. lxxxvii	12 July 1869
An Act to confer further powers upon the Mayor, Aldermen, and Burgesses of the Borough of Preston as a Municipal Corporation, and also as the Local Board of Health.
Brighton Aquarium and Improvements Act 1869 (repealed)	32 & 33 Vict. c. lxxxviii	12 July 1869
An Act for re-incorporating and giving additional powers to the Brighton Aquarium Company, and for other purposes. (Repealed by Brighton Corporation Act 1901 (1 Edw. 7. c. ccxxiv))
Great Eastern Railway (Additional Powers) Act 1869	32 & 33 Vict. c. lxxxix	12 July 1869
An Act to authorize the Great Eastern Railway Company to abandon the construction of certain railways and to purchase lands for station purposes; also to enact certain provisions with respect to the Great Eastern Metropolitan Undertaking; and for other purposes.
St. Mary, Newington, Rectory Act 1869	32 & 33 Vict. c. xc	12 July 1869
An Act for making better provision for the cure of souls within the original limits of the parish of Saint Mary, Newington, in the diocese of London.
Whitland and Taf Vale Railway Act 1869	32 & 33 Vict. c. xci	12 July 1869
An Act for making a railway from the Great Western (South Wales) Railway near Whitland to Crymmych Arms in the county of Pembroke.
East Norfolk Railway Act 1869	32 & 33 Vict. c. xcii	12 July 1869
An Act to extend the time for the completion of the East Norfolk Railway, and for other purposes.
Southsea Railway (Abandonment) Act 1869	32 & 33 Vict. c. xciii	12 July 1869
An Act for the abandonment of the railways authorized by The Southsea Railway Act, 1867, (Note: Southsea Railway Act 1867 (30 & 31 Vict. c. cxciv)) and for other purposes. (Repealed by Statute Law (Repeals) Act 2013 (c. 2))
Metropolitan Street Tramways Act 1869	32 & 33 Vict. c. xciv	12 July 1869
An Act to authorize the construction of Street Tramways in certain parts of the Metropolis south of the River Thames, and for other purposes.
Pimlico, Peckham and Greenwich Street Tramways Act 1869	32 & 33 Vict. c. xcv	12 July 1869
An Act to authorize the construction of Street Tramways from Pimlico to Peckham and Greenwich, and for other purposes.
Garstang and Knot End Railway Act 1869	32 & 33 Vict. c. xcvi	12 July 1869
An Act to extend the time for the purchase of lands, and for the completion of the Garstang and Knot End Railway, and for increasing the capital of the Garstang and Knot End Railway Company.
Milford Improvement Act 1869 (repealed)	32 & 33 Vict. c. xcvii	12 July 1869
An Act for enabling the Milford Improvement Commissioners to borrow further monies, and for other purposes. (Repealed by Dyfed Act 1987 (c. xxiv))
Caledonian and Glasgow and South Western Railways (Kilmarnock Joint Line) Act 1869	32 & 33 Vict. c. xcviii	12 July 1869
An Act for improving and completing a direct line of railway communication between Glasgow and Kilmarnock, via Crofthead, and for vesting the same in the Caledonian and Glasgow and South-western Railway Companies; and for abandoning the Kilmarnock Direct Railway; and for other purposes.
Crystal Palace and South London Joint Railway Act 1869	32 & 33 Vict. c. xcix	12 July 1869
An Act to authorize the Crystal Palace and South London Junction Railway Company to make a short Railway in the parish of Saint Mary, Lambeth, in the county of Surrey; and for other purposes.
Dublin Port and Docks Act 1869	32 & 33 Vict. c. c	12 July 1869
An Act to consolidate and amend the several Acts relating to the Port and Harbour of Dublin and the Dublin Port and Docks Board; and for other purposes.
North Metropolitan Tramways Act 1869	32 & 33 Vict. c. ci	12 July 1869
An Act to authorize the construction of Street Tramways in certain parts of the Metropolis north of the River Thames, and for other purposes.
Aberdare and Aberaman Gas Act 1869	32 & 33 Vict. c. cii	12 July 1869
An Act for supplying with Gas the towns of Aberdare and Aberaman and the parish of Aberdare, all in the county of Glamorgan.
Severn Navigation Act 1869	32 & 33 Vict. c. ciii	12 July 1869
An Act for further improving the Navigation of the River Severn, and for amending and extending the Severn Navigation Acts; and for other purposes.
Walton-on-Thames and Weybridge Gas Act 1869	32 & 33 Vict. c. civ	12 July 1869
An Act for better supplying with Gas the parishes of Walton-on-Thames and Weybridge in the county of Surrey, and for supplying the parish of Shepperton in the county of Middlesex; and for other purposes.
North Eastern Railway Act 1869	32 & 33 Vict. c. cv	12 July 1869
An Act to enable the North-eastern Railway Company to alter and abandon part of their authorized Gilling and Pickering Railway, and of their Port Clarence Branch, and to confer on the Company further powers in reference to other portions of their undertaking; and for other purposes.
Milnrow Gas Act 1869	32 & 33 Vict. c. cvi	12 July 1869
An Act to incorporate a Company for better supplying Milnrow, in the parish of Rochdale in the county of Lancaster, and the neighbourhood thereof, with Gas; and for other purposes.
Cleveland Waterworks Act 1869	32 & 33 Vict. c. cvii	12 July 1869
An Act to dissolve the Cleveland Water Company (Limited) and re-incorporate the members thereof, and to make further provision for the supply of water to Saltburn-by-the-Sea, Skelton, and other places in Cleveland; and for other purposes.
Dublin and Drogheda Railway (North Wall Extension) Act 1869	32 & 33 Vict. c. cviii	12 July 1869
An Act for enabling the Dublin and Drogheda Railway Company to effect a communication between their railway and the works of the London and North-western Railway Company at the North Wall, Dublin; and for other purposes.
Great Western Railway Act 1869	32 & 33 Vict. c. cix	12 July 1869
An Act for conferring further powers on the Great Western Railway Company in relation to their own undertaking and the undertakings of other Companies; and for other purposes.
Huddersfield Water Act 1869	32 & 33 Vict. c. cx	12 July 1869
An Act for transferring to the Corporation of Huddersfield the undertaking of the Commissioners for the Huddersfield Waterworks, and for empowering the Corporation to construct additional Waterworks and to supply Water within extended limits; and for other purposes.
Bristol and North Somerset Railway Act 1869	32 & 33 Vict. c. cxi	12 July 1869
An Act for arranging the affairs of the Bristol and North Somerset Railway Company, and for other purposes.
West Surrey Water Act 1869	32 & 33 Vict. c. cxii	12 July 1869
An Act for better supplying with Water the towns of Walton, Weybridge, Chertsey, Byfleet, Cobham, and Shepperton, and the several parishes and places adjacent thereto, in the counties of Middlesex and Surrey; and for other purposes.
Mid-Wales Railway Act 1869	32 & 33 Vict. c. cxiii	12 July 1869
An Act to revive and extend the time limited by The Mid-Wales Railway (Western Extensions) Act, 1865, (Note: Mid Wales Railway (Western Extensions) Act 1865 (28 & 29 Vict. c. ccclxxi)) for the compulsory purchase of lands and completion of works, and to abandon the formation of the Railways authorized by The Mid-Wales Railway Act, 1864, (Note: Mid Wales Railway Act 1864 (27 & 28 Vict. c. cxlii)) and The Mid-Wales Railway (Eastern Extension) Act, 1865, (Note: Mid Wales Railway (Eastern Extension) Act 1865 (28 & 29 Vict. c. clix)) respectively, and to enable the Mid-Wales Railway Company to use a portion of the Neath and Brecon Railway; and for other purposes.
Dundee Harbour Act 1869 (repealed)	32 & 33 Vict. c. cxiv	12 July 1869
An Act for improving and maintaining the Harbour of Dundee and the Docks and Works connected therewith, and amending the Acts relating to the said Harbour; and for other purposes. (Repealed by Dundee Harbour Consolidation Act 1875 (38 & 39 Vict. c. cl))
London and North Western Railway (New Works and Additional Powers) Act 1869	32 & 33 Vict. c. cxv	12 July 1869
An Act for conferring additional powers on the London and North-western Railway Company for the construction of new works, and in relation to their own undertaking and the undertakings of other Companies; and for other purposes.
London, Chatham and Dover Railway (Arbitration) Act 1869	32 & 33 Vict. c. cxvi	12 July 1869
An Act to confer additional powers on the London, Chatham, and Dover Railway Company for the construction of works, and otherwise in relation to their own undertaking and the undertakings of other Companies; and for other purposes.
Manchester Corporation Waterworks and Improvement Act 1869	32 & 33 Vict. c. cxvii	12 July 1869
An Act for enabling the Mayor, Aldermen, and Citizens of the City of Manchester to purchase additional lands for the purposes of their Waterworks, to widen and alter Deansgate, to acquire additional lands, and to raise further monies; and for other purposes.
Newport (Monmouthshire) Harbour Act 1869	32 & 33 Vict. c. cxviii	12 July 1869
An Act for authorizing the construction of a Dry Dock and other works at Newport by and for conferring other powers upon the Newport Harbour Commissioners.
North British Railway Act 1869	32 & 33 Vict. c. cxix	12 July 1869
An Act to confer various powers upon the North British Railway Company for the abandonment of certain railways and works, the purchase of lands for station purposes, and with respect to superfluous lands, deferred preference dividends, and other matters connected with their undertaking; and for other purposes.
St. Helens Improvement Act 1869 or the Saint Helens Improvement Act 1869	32 & 33 Vict. c. cxx	12 July 1869
An Act to dissolve the Local Boards of the districts of Sutton and Parr, in the borough of Saint Helens in the county of Lancaster, and to repeal the Saint Helens Improvement Act, 1855, (Note: Saint Helens Improvement Act 1855 (18 & 19 Vict. c. lxxiv)) and to constitute the Corporation of the said borough the Local Authority therein for the improving and governing of the said borough; to enable the said Corporation to extend their Waterworks and to purchase the undertakings of the Saint Helens Waterworks Company and the Saint Helens Gas Company; and for other purposes.
Watton and Swaffham Railway Act 1869	32 & 33 Vict. c. cxxi	12 July 1869
An Act to incorporate a Company for extending the Thetford and Watton Railway to the Great Eastern Railway at Swaffham in Norfolk.
Oxford Gaslight and Coke Company's Act 1869	32 & 33 Vict. c. cxxii	12 July 1869
An Act for granting further powers to "The Oxford Gaslight and Coke Company."
Poor Law Board's Provisional Orders Confirmation Act 1869 (repealed)	32 & 33 Vict. c. cxxiii	26 July 1869
An Act to confirm three Provisional Orders made by the Poor Law Board under The Poor Law Amendment Act, 1867, (Note: Poor Law Amendment Act 1867 (30 & 31 Vict. c. 106)) with reference to the city of Chester, the incorporated hundreds of Tunstead and Happing in the county of Norfolk, and the parish of Woolavington in the county of Sussex. (Repealed by Statute Law (Repeals) Act 2013 (c. 2))
	Chester Order 1869 Chester Incorporation.	
	Tunstead and Happing Hundreds Order 1869 Tunstead and Happing Incorporated Hundreds.	
	Midhurst Union (Woolavington) Order 1869 Midhurst Union. Parish of Woolavington.	
Local Government Supplemental Act 1869	32 & 33 Vict. c. cxxiv	26 July 1869
An Act to confirm certain Provisional Orders under The Local Government Act, 1858, (Note: Local Government Act 1858 (21 & 22 Vict. c. 98)) relating to the districts of Bideford, Bournemouth, Bowness, Bristol, Croydon (2), Fleetwood, Hanley, Harrogate, Litchurch, Litherland, Portsmouth, Rochdale, Ryde, and Worthing; and for other purposes relative to certain districts under that Act.
	Bideford Order 1869 Provisional Order putting in force the Lands Clauses Consolidation Act, 1845, (Note: Lands Clauses Consolidation Act 1845 (8 & 9 Vict. c. 18)) within the District of the Bideford (Devonshire) Local Board, for the Purchase of Lands by the said Board for Works of Water Supply.	
	Bournemouth Order 1869 Provisional Order altering the Bournemouth Improvement Act, 1856. (Note: Bournemouth Improvement Act 1856 (19 & 20 Vict. c. xc))	
	Bowness Order 1869 Provisional Order for altering the Boundaries of the District of Bowness in the County of Westmoreland under the Provisions of the Local Government Act, 1858.	
	Bristol Order 1869 Provisional Order altering Parts of a Local Act (Note: Bristol Improvement Act 1840 (3 & 4 Vict. c. lxxvii)) in force within the District of the Bristol Local Board of Health.	
	Croydon Order 1869 (1) Provisional Order altering a Local Act (Note: Croydon Court House, Market House and Burial Ground Act 1806 (46 Geo. 3. c. cxxx)) in force within the District of the Croydon Local Board of Health.	
	Croydon Order 1869 (2) Provisional Order for altering the Provisional Order applying the Public Health Act, 1848, (Note: Public Health Act 1848 (11 & 12 Vict. c. 63)) to the District of Croydon, in the County of Surrey.	
	Fleetwood Order 1869 Provisional Order repealing and altering Parts of a Local Act (Note: Fleetwood Improvement Act 1842 (5 & 6 Vict. c. xlix)) in force within the District of the Fleetwood Improvement Commissioners.	
	Hanley Order 1869 Provisional Order putting in force the Lands Clauses Consolidation Act, 1845, within the District of the Hanley (Staffordshire) Local Board, for the Purchase of Lands by the said Board for Purposes of Street Improvement.	
	Harrogate Order 1869 Provisional Order putting in force the Lands Clauses Consolidation Act, 1845, within the District of Harrogate, in the County of York, for the Purchase of Lands by the Local Board of Health of the aforesaid District for Sewage Irrigation.	
	Litchurch Order 1869 Provisional Order putting in force the Lands Clauses Consolidation Act, 1845, within the District of the Litchurch (Derbyshire) Local Board, for the Purchase of Lands by the said Board for Purposes of Drainage.	
	Litherland Order 1869 Provisional Order for extending the Borrowing Powers of the Litherland Local Board.	
	Portsmouth Order 1869 Provisional Order putting in force the Lands Clauses Consolidation Act, 1845, within the District of the Borough of Portsmouth Local Board, for the Purchase of Lands by the said Board for Purposes of Street Improvement.	
	Rochdale Order 1869 Provisional Order repealing and altering Parts of a Local Act (Note: Rochdale Improvement Act 1853 (16 & 17 Vict. c. ccxx)) in force within the Town and Borough of Rochdale.	
	Ryde Order 1869 Provisional Order for extending the Borrowing Powers of the Ryde Local Board.	
	Worthing Order 1869 Provisional Order providing for the future execution and partial repeal and alteration of a certain Local Act (Note: Worthing and Lancing Turnpike Road and Sea Defences Act 1826 (7 Geo. 4. c. x)) in force within the District of Worthing, in the County of Sussex.	
Dorking Water Act 1869	32 & 33 Vict. c. cxxv	26 July 1869
An Act for better supplying with Water the parish of Dorking in the county of Surrey.
Caledonian Railway (Abandonment, &c.) Act 1869	32 & 33 Vict. c. cxxvi	26 July 1869
An Act for enabling the Caledonian Railway Company to abandon certain authorized railways; for sanctioning the acquisition by that Company of certain land; for altering the mode of raising a portion of their authorized share capital; for authorizing the amalgamation of the Crieff and Methven Junction Railway Company with the Company, and agreements with other companies and parties; and for other purposes.
Bude and Torrington Junction Railway Act 1869	32 & 33 Vict. c. cxxvii	26 July 1869
An Act to form into a separate undertaking the Bude and Torrington Extensions of the Devon and Cornwall Railway Company, and to incorporate a Company for the making and maintaining thereof; and for other purposes.
Imperial Gas Act 1869	32 & 33 Vict. c. cxxviii	26 July 1869
An Act to authorize the Imperial Gaslight and Coke Company to raise more money and purchase more land; and for other purposes.
Keighley Waterworks Extension and Improvement Act 1869	32 & 33 Vict. c. cxxix	26 July 1869
An Act for authorizing the Local Board of Health for the District of Keighley to make additional Waterworks, for extending the limits within which the Board may supply Water and Gas, for authorizing improvements in the town of Keighley; and for other purposes.
South Metropolitan Gaslight and Coke Company's Act 1869	32 & 33 Vict. c. cxxx	26 July 1869
An Act to increase the capital of the South Metropolitan Gaslight and Coke Company, and for other purposes with relation to the same Company.
Wolverhampton Improvement Act 1869 (repealed)	32 & 33 Vict. c. cxxxi	26 July 1869
An Act for defining and Extending the powers of the Corporation of Wolverhampton in relation to the Management of Streets in the Borough, and to Sewerage, and to Police and other matters of Local Government, and to Water Supply; and for other purposes. (Repealed by Wolverhampton Corporation Act 1969 (c. lx))
Dundalk and Greenore Railway Act 1869	32 & 33 Vict. c. cxxxii	26 July 1869
An Act to give further time for the completion of the Railways of the Dundalk and Greenore Railway Company and the joint works authorized by the Newry and Greenore Railway Act, 1863; (Note: Newry and Greenore Railway Act 1863 (26 & 27 Vict. c. ccxxix)) and for other purposes.
Township of Kingstown Act 1869	32 & 33 Vict. c. cxxxiii	26 July 1869
An Act to amend The Towns Improvement (Ireland) Act, 1854, (Note: Towns Improvement (Ireland) Act 1854 (17 & 18 Vict. c. 103)) so far as relates to the town of Kingstown; and for other purposes.
Park Lane Improvement Act 1869 (repealed)	32 & 33 Vict. c. cxxxiv	26 July 1869
An Act to enable the Metropolitan Board of Works to widen Hamilton Place and to extend the same into and improve Park Lane in the parish of Saint George, Hanover Square, in the county of Middlesex; and for other purposes. (Repealed by Local Law (Greater London Council and Inner London Boroughs) Order 1965 (SI 1965/540))
Bradford Waterworks Act 1869	32 & 33 Vict. c. cxxxv	26 July 1869
An Act to authorize the Mayor, Aldermen, and Burgesses of the borough of Bradford, in the west riding of the county of York, to construct new Waterworks; and for other purposes.
Metropolitan Railway Act 1869	32 & 33 Vict. c. cxxxvi	26 July 1869
An Act to grant further powers to the Metropolitan Railway Company.
Severn and Wye Railway and Canal Act 1869	32 & 33 Vict. c. cxxxvii	26 July 1869
An Act to enable the Severn and Wye Railway and Canal Company to improve and extend their undertaking; and for other purposes with relation to the same Company.
Richmond and Reeth Railway Act 1869	32 & 33 Vict. c. cxxxviii	26 July 1869
An Act for making a Railway from the Northeastern Railway at Richmond to Reeth in the north riding of the county of York; and for other purposes.
Borough of Truro Waterworks Act 1869	32 & 33 Vict. c. cxxxix	26 July 1869
An Act for better supplying with Water the borough of Truro in the county of Cornwall.
Hereford, Hay and Brecon Railway Act 1869	32 & 33 Vict. c. cxl	26 July 1869
An Act for the conversion of the Mortgages of the Hereford, Hay, and Brecon Railway Company into Debenture Stock; and for other purposes relating to the same Company.
Festiniog Railway Act 1869	32 & 33 Vict. c. cxli	26 July 1869
An Act for enabling the Festiniog Railway Company to widen and improve their railway, and to raise further money; and for other purposes.
Brean Down Harbour and Docks Act 1869 (repealed)	32 & 33 Vict. c. cxlii	26 July 1869
An Act to give further time for the completion of Brean Down Harbour, and for the compulsory purchase of lands for the Brean Down Docks; and for other purposes. (Repealed by Brean Down Harbour and Railway Act 1889 (52 & 53 Vict. c. cciv))
Watlington and Princes Risborough Railway Act 1869	32 & 33 Vict. c. cxliii	26 July 1869
An Act for making a Railway from Princes Risborough in the county of Buckingham to Watlington in the county of Oxford; and for other purposes.
Edinburgh and District Waterworks Act 1869 (repealed)	32 & 33 Vict. c. cxliv	26 July 1869
An Act to create and incorporate a Public Trust for supplying Water to the city of Edinburgh, town and port of Leith, town of Portobello, and districts and places adjacent; to transfer to the Trust the undertaking and powers of the Edinburgh Water Company; and for other purposes. (Repealed by Edinburgh Corporation Order Confirmation Act 1958 (7 & 8 Eliz. 2. c. v))
Neath and Brecon Railway (Amalgamation and Arrangement) Act 1869	32 & 33 Vict. c. cxlv	26 July 1869
An Act for vesting the undertaking of the Swansea Vale and Neath and Brecon Junction Railway Company in the Neath and Brecon Railway Company; for suspending legal proceedings against the Neath and Brecon Railway Company; for converting the mortgage and other debts into debenture stock; for raising money, and regulating the capital of that Company; and for other purposes.
Haddenham, Willingham and Longstanton Railway Act 1869	32 & 33 Vict. c. cxlvi	26 July 1869
An Act for making a railway from the Ely, Haddenham, and Sutton Railway at Haddenham to the Great Eastern Railway at Longstanton; and for other purposes.
Sligo Borough Improvement Act 1869	32 & 33 Vict. c. cxlvii	26 July 1869
An Act to make better provision for the Local Management of the borough of Sligo; and for dissolving the Town and Harbour Commissioners of Sligo, and vesting in the Corporation of the borough the powers of the Town Commissioners and incorporating a new body of Harbour Commissioners; and for empowering the Corporation to construct Waterworks and supply Water, and to acquire Gasworks and supply Gas; and for other purposes.
Holyhead Docks and Warehouses Act 1869	32 & 33 Vict. c. cxlviii	2 August 1869
An Act to incorporate a Company for constructing Docks, Warehouses, and other works in the parish of Holyhead in the county of Anglesea, and for other purposes.
Drainage and Improvement of Lands Supplemental Act (Ireland) 1869 or the Drainage and Improvement of Lands Supplemental (Ireland) Act 1869	32 & 33 Vict. c. cxlix	9 August 1869
An Act to confirm Provisional Orders under The Drainage and Improvement of Lands (Ireland) Act, 1863, and the Acts amending the same.
	Gully River Drainage District Provisional Order 1869 In the matter of "the Gully Drainage District" in the Queen's County.	
	Island Lakes and Glore River Drainage District Provisional Order 1869 In the matter of "the Island Lakes and Glore River Drainage District," in the county of Mayo.	
Local Government Supplemental Act 1869 (No. 2) or the Local Government Supplemental (No. 2) Act 1869	32 & 33 Vict. c. cl	9 August 1869
An Act to confirm certain Provisional Orders under The Local Government Act, 1858, relating to the districts of Aberystwith, Ashton-under-Lyne, Bath, Cleckhcaton, Crompton, Newport (Monmouthshire), Reading, Southport, Stalybridge, and Weston-super-Mare.
	Aberystwyth Order 1869 Provisional Order for extending the Borrowing Powers of the Aberystwith Local Board.	
	Ashton-under-Lyne Order 1869 Provisional Order for the alteration of the Ashton-under-Lyne Improvement Act, 1819, (Note: Ashton-under-Lyne Improvement Act 1849 (12 & 13 Vict. c. xxxv)) in force within the Borough of Ashton-under-Lyne, in the County Palatine of Lancaster, for increasing the borrowing powers of the Town Council of the said Borough, and for other purposes.	
	Bath Order 1869 Provisional Order putting in force the Lands Clauses Consolidation Act, 1845, within the District of the Bath (City) Local Board of Health, for the Purchase of Lands by the said Board for the Purpose of a Street Improvement.	
	Cleckheaton Order 1869 Provisional Order for separating the Hamlets of Scholes and Oakenshaw from the District of Cleckheaton in the County of York, and for other purposes.	
	Crompton Order 1869 Provisional Order putting in force the Lands Clauses Consolidation Act, 1845, within the District of the Crompton (Lancashire) Local Board, for the Purchase of Lands by the said Board for Purposes of Street Improvements.	
	Newport (Monmouthshire) Order 1869 Provisional Order putting in force the Lands Clauses Consolidation Act, 1845, within the District of the Newport (Monmouthshire) Local Board of Health, for the Purchase of Lands by the said Board for Purposes of Street Improvement.	
	Reading Order 1869 Provisional Order putting in force the Lands Clauses Consolidation Act, 1845, within the District of the Borough of Reading (Berkshire) Local Board of Health, for the Purchase of Lands by the said Board for Street Improvements.	
	Southport Order 1869 Provisional Order for extending the Borrowing Powers of the Southport Improvement Commissioners.	
	Stalybridge Order 1869 Provisional Order for extending the Borrowing Powers of the Stalybridge Local Board.	
	Weston-super-Mare Order 1869 Provisional Order putting in force the Lands Clauses Consolidation Act, 1845, within the District of the Weston-super-Mare (Somerset) Local Board, for the Purchase of Lands by the said Board for purposes of Street Improvements.	
Ellesmere and Glyn Valley Railway Act 1869 (repealed)	32 & 33 Vict. c. cli	9 August 1869
An Act to authorize the abandonment of a certain portion of the railways authorized by The Ellesmere and Glyn Valley Railway Act, 1866, (Note: Ellesmere and Glyn Valley Railway Act 1866 (29 & 30 Vict. c. cccxxxv)) and an extension of time for the compulsory purchase of lands and the completion of other portions of the said railways; and for other purposes. (Repealed by Glyn Valley Tramway Act 1870 (33 & 34 Vict. c. clxvi))
Callington and Calstock Railway Act 1869	32 & 33 Vict. c. clii	9 August 1869
An Act for making a Railway from Callington to Calstock in the county of Cornwall, and for other purposes.
Wrexham, Mold and Connah's Quay Railway (Arrangement) Act 1869	32 & 33 Vict. c. cliii	9 August 1869
An Act to authorize the Wrexham, Mold, and Connah's Quay Railway Company to raise a sum of money for their undertaking; and for other purposes.
Furness Railway Act 1869	32 & 33 Vict. c. cliv	9 August 1869
An Act for conferring further powers upon the Furness Railway Company for the construction of Works and the acquisition of Lands, and otherwise in relation to their undertaking; and for other purposes.
Belgravia and South Kensington New Road Act 1869	32 & 33 Vict. c. clv	9 August 1869
An Act to extend the time for the purchase of lands for, and completion of, the Belgravia and South Kensington New Road; and for other purposes.
Portobello Pier Act 1869	32 & 33 Vict. c. clvi	9 August 1869
An Act to authorize the construction of a Pier at Portobello in the county of Edinburgh.
Belgrave Market Act 1869 (repealed)	32 & 33 Vict. c. clvii	9 August 1869
An Act for making and maintaining a Market in Saint Luke, Chelsea, in the county of Middlesex; and for other purposes. (Repealed by Statute Law (Repeals) Act 2008 (c. 12))
Broughty Ferry Provisional Order Confirmation Act 1869 (repealed)	32 & 33 Vict. c. clviii	11 August 1869
An Act to confirm a Provisional Order under The General Police and Improvement (Scotland) Act, 1862, (Note: General Police and Improvement (Scotland) Act 1862 (25 & 26 Vict. c. 101)) relating to the Burgh of Broughty Ferry. (Repealed by Dundee Boundaries Act 1913 (3 & 4 Geo. 5. c. lxxx))
	Broughty Ferry. General Police and Improvement (Scotland) Act, 1862. (25 & 26 Victoria, chapter 101.)	
Annual Inclosure Act 1869	32 & 33 Vict. c. clix	11 August 1869
An Act to authorize the inclosure of certain lands in pursuance of a report of the Inclosure Commissioners for England and Wales.

=== Private acts ===
Short title	Citation	Royal assent
Long title
Novar and Culcairn Estates Act 1869	32 & 33 Vict. c. 1 Pr.	24 June 1869
An Act to authorize the exchange of parts of the entailed estate of Novar, in the counties of Ross and Elgin, for parts of the entailed estates of Contullich and Culcairn and the fee-simple lands of Inchcoulter, in the county of Ross.
Joseph Crossley's Estate Act 1869	32 & 33 Vict. c. 2 Pr.	12 July 1869
An Act for making better provision respecting the disposition of the estate of the late Joseph Crossley of Halifax, deceased; and for other purposes.
Marquis Camden's Estate Act 1869	32 & 33 Vict. c. 3 Pr.	12 July 1869
An Act for authorizing the raising of Money on the security of part of the Settled Estates of the Marquis Camden for the purpose of the erection of a Mansion House thereon; and for other purposes.
Lord Calthorpe's Leasing Act 1869	32 & 33 Vict. c. 4 Pr.	12 July 1869
An Act for confirming certain Building Leases granted by the Right Honorable Frederick Lord Calthorpe, Baron Calthorpe of Calthorpe in the county of Norfolk, deceased, of various parts of an estate situate in the parish of Edgbaston in the county of Warwick, and for altering the present powers of leasing over the same and other estates comprised in a re-settlement of the same dated the eighteenth day of July one thousand eight hundred and sixty-four; and for other purposes.
Lloyd's Manchester Estates Act 1869	32 & 33 Vict. c. 5 Pr.	12 July 1869
An Act for authorizing the leasing, selling, exchanging, and partitioning of Estates in the parish of Manchester in the county of Lancaster.
Ferguson Bequest Fund Act 1869	32 & 33 Vict. c. 6 Pr.	26 July 1869
An Act to incorporate the Trustees of the deceased John Ferguson, of Cairnbrook, under the name of "The Ferguson Bequest Fund," and to enlarge the powers of said Trustees, the better to enable them to carry out the designs of the deceased.
Shrewsbury Estate Act 1869	32 & 33 Vict. c. 7 Pr.	9 August 1869
An Act for enabling the Right Honorable Charles John Earl of Shrewsbury, and other the persons for the time being entitled to the estates annexed to the earldom of Shrewsbury, to make arrangements with the persons claiming to be entitled to or interested in lands at Oxton, in the county of Chester, under certain leases granted by Charles fifteenth Earl of Shrewsbury, John sixteenth Earl of Shrewsbury, and Bertram Arthur seventeenth Earl of Shrewsbury, respecting the premises comprised in such leases, and for annexing lands at Oxton to the earldom of Shrewsbury; and for other purposes.
Lady Slaney's (Trust) Estate Act 1869	32 & 33 Vict. c. 8 Pr.	9 August 1869
An Act to authorize the Wardens and Commonalty of the Mystery of Grocers of the City of London, as Trustees under the will of Dame Margaret Slaney, deceased, to consent to the union of the Benefices of Allhallows Staining and Saint Olave Hart Street in the City of London, and for enabling the Trustees to carry into more complete effect the trusts of the will, and for facilitating such union.
Williams' Estate Act 1869	32 & 33 Vict. c. 9 Pr.	9 August 1869
An Act for authorizing mortgages of certain Real Estates in Manchester and Salford, in the county of Lancaster, subject to the will of the late Harriott Williams, deceased, and for other purposes, and of which the short title is "Williams's Estate Act, 1869."
Wilshere's Estate Act 1869	32 & 33 Vict. c. 10 Pr.	9 August 1869
An Act for authorizing the Trustees of the settlement dated the 5th day of June 1830, executed in accordance with the directions contained in the will of William Wilshere, Esquire, deceased, to pull down part of the family mansion called the Frythe, and to rebuild the same, and to make alterations in the remaining part of the mansion, and to build cottages on the settled estates, and for authorizing the granting of building leases and sales of parts of the settled estates, and for obtaining the enfranchisement of copyholds; and for other purposes.
Bruce's Restitution Act 1869 (Note: This act was not printed by the Queens's Printer.)	32 & 33 Vict. c. 11 Pr.	19 March 1869
An Act to relieve Alexander Hugh Bruce, of Kennet, in the county of Clackmannan, Esquire, and the heirs for the time being of the body of Michael first Lord Balfour of Burley, in the Peerage of Scotland, from the effect of the attainder of Robert fifth Lord Balfour of Burley.
Ralli's Naturalization Act 1869	32 & 33 Vict. c. 12 Pr.	24 June 1869
An Act to confer upon Pandeli Ralli all the rights, privileges, and capacities of a natural-born subject of Her Majesty the Queen.

=== Sources ===
- Rickards, George Kettilby, ed. (1869). The Statutes of the United Kingdom of Great Britain and Ireland, 32 & 33 Victoria, 1869–9. London: Eyre & Spottiswoode – via Internet Archive.
- Rickards, George Kettilby, ed. (1869). The Statutes of the United Kingdom of Great Britain and Ireland, 32 & 33 Victoria, 1869–9. London: Eyre & Spottiswoode – via Internet Archive.
- Rickards, George Kettilby, ed. (1869). The Statutes of the United Kingdom of Great Britain and Ireland, 32 & 33 Victoria, 1869–9. London: Eyre & Spottiswoode – via Internet Archive.

== See also ==
- List of acts of the Parliament of the United Kingdom
