= Bankruptcy Repeal and Insolvent Court Act 1869 =

Act of the Parliament of the United Kingdom

- Act of Parliament
- Parliament of the United Kingdom
- Long title: An Act to provide for the winding-up of the business of the late Court for the Relief of Insolvent Debtors in England, and to repeal Enactments relating to Insolvency, Bankruptcy, Imprisonment for Debt, and matters connected therewith.
- Citation: 32 & 33 Vict. c. 83
- Introduced by: Robert Collier MP (Commons)
- Territorial extent: United Kingdom

Dates
- Royal assent: 9 August 1869
- Commencement: 1 January 1870 (Note: Section 2. See section 3 of the Bankruptcy Act 1869 (32 & 33 Vict. c. 71).)
- Repealed: 22 September 1893
Other legislation
Amends	See § Repealed enactments
Repeals/revokes	See § Repealed enactments
Amended by	Supreme Court of Judicature Act 1875
Repealed by	Statute Law Revision (No. 2) Act 1893
Relates to	Bankrupt Law Consolidation Act 1849; Bankruptcy Act 1869; Bankruptcy Act 1883

Status: Repealed

Text of statute as originally enacted

The Bankruptcy Repeal and Insolvent Court Act 1869 (32 & 33 Vict. c. 83) was an act of the Parliament of the United Kingdom that amended and repealed enactments related to bankruptcy in England and Wales.

== Background ==
The Bankruptcy Act 1869 (32 & 33 Vict. c. 71), passed at the same time as this act, amended and consolidated enactments related to bankruptcy in England and Wales.

== Passage ==
Leave to bring in the Insolvent Debtors and Bankruptcy Repeal Bill to the House of Commons was granted to the attorney general, Robert Collier MP and the solicitor general, Sir John Coleridge MP on 11 May 1869. The bill had its first reading in the House of Commons on 28 May 1869, presented by the attorney general, Robert Collier MP. The bill had its second reading in the House of Commons on 18 June 1869 and was committed to a committee of the whole house, which met on 22 June 1869 and 25 June 1869 and reported on 25 June 1869, with amendments. The amended bill was re-committed to a committee of the whole house, which met on 9 July 1869 and reported on 12 July 1869, with amendments. The amended bill had its third reading in the House of Commons on 13 July 1869 and passed, without amendments.

The bill had its first reading in the House of Lords on 15 July 1869. The bill had its second reading in the House of Lords on 29 July 1869 and was committed to a committee of the whole house, which met and reported on 30 July 1869, with amendments. The amended bill had its third reading in the House of Lords on 3 August 1869 and passed, with amendments.

The amended bill was considered and agreed to by the House of Commons on 5 August 1869.

The bill was granted royal assent on 9 August 1869.

== Provisions ==
=== Repealed enactments ===
Section 20 of the act repealed 37 enactments, listed in the schedule to the act.

Citation	Short title	Description	Extent of repeal
13 Edw. 1. (Stat. West. 2.). c. 11	Accountants Act 1285	The masters remedy against their servants and other accomptants.	The whole act.
25 Edw. 3. Stat. 5. c. 17	Process of Exigent Act 1351	Process of exigent in debt, detinue, and replevin.	The whole act.
12 Geo. 1. c. 29	Frivolous Arrests Act 1725	An Act to prevent frivolous and vexatious arrests.	Sections one and two.
19 Geo. 3. c. 70	Inferior Courts Act 1779	An Act for extending the provisions of an Act made in the twelfth year of the reign of King George the First, intituled an Act to prevent frivolous and vexatious arrests; and for other purposes.	Sections one, two, and three, and so much of section four as relates to execution against the person of defendant, and to detaining defendant.
43 Geo. 3. c. 46	Parish Apprentices Act 1802	An Act for the more effectual prevention of frivolous and vexatious arrests and suits, and to authorize the levying of poundage upon executions in certain cases.	Sections one, two, three, and six, so far as they relate to England.
48 Geo. 3. c. 123	Discharge of Certain Imprisoned Debtors Act 1808	An Act for the discharge of debtors in execution for small debts from imprisonment in certain cases.	The whole act.
52 Geo. 3. c. 144	Members of Parliament (Bankruptcy) Act 1812	An Act to suspend and finally vacate the seats of members of the House of Commons, who shall become bankrupts, and who shall not pay their debts in full within limited time.	Except so far as it relates to Scotland and Ireland.
1 & 2 Geo. 4. c. 115	Bankruptcy Court Act 1821	An Act to repeal so much of an Act of the fifth year of the reign of His late Majesty King George the Second, relating to bankrupts, as requires the meetings under commissions of bankrupt to be holden in the Guildhall of the city of London, and for building offices in the said city for the meetings of the commissioners, and for the more regular transaction of business in bankruptcy.	The whole act.
7 & 8 Geo. 4. c. 71	Imprisonment for Debt Act 1827	An Act to prevent arrests upon mesne process where the debt or cause of action is under twenty pounds, and to regulate the practice of arrests.	Except section six.
11 Geo. 4 & 1 Will. 4. c. 70	Law Terms Act 1830	An Act for the more administration of justice in England and Wales.	Sections twenty-one and twenty-two.
1 & 2 Will. 4. c. 56	Bankruptcy Court (England) Act 1831	An Act to establish court in bankruptcy.	The whole act.
2 & 3 Will. 4. c. 39	Process in Courts of Law at Westminster Act 1832	An Act for uniformity of pro- cess in personal actions in His Majesty’s courts of law at Westminster.	Sections one to ten, both inclusive.
2 & 3 Will. 4. c. 114	Bankruptcy (England) Act 1832	An Act to amend the laws relating to bankrupts.	The whole act.
3 & 4 Will. 4. c. 84	Lord Chancellor's Offices Act 1833	An Act to provide for the performance of the duties of certain offices connected with the Court of Chancery which have been abolished.	Section nine.
5 & 6 Will. 4. c. 29	Bankruptcy Act 1835	An Act for investing in Government securities portion of the cash lying unemployed in the Bank of England belonging to bankrupts estates, and applying the interest thereon in discharge of the expenses of the Court of Bankruptcy, and for the relief of the suitors in the said court, and for removing doubts as to the extent of the powers of the Court of Review and of the subdivision courts.	The whole act.
6 & 7 Will. 4. c. 27	Bankruptcy Act 1836	An Act for investing in Government securities further portions of the cash lying unemployed in the Bank of England belonging to bankrupts estates.	The whole act.
1 & 2 Vict. c. 110	Judgments Act 1838	An Act for abolishing arrest on mesne process in civil actions, except in certain cases; for extending the remedies of creditors against the property of debtors and for amending the laws for the relief of insolvent debtors in England.	Sections one to ten, both inclusive. So much of section eighteen as relates to orders of the Lord Chancellor or of the Court of Review in matters of bankruptcy, and sections twenty-three to one hundred and twenty-three, both inclusive
2 & 3 Vict. c. 39	Insolvent Debtors Act 1839	An Act to amend an Act passed in the last session of Parliament for abolishing arrest on mesne process in civil actions, except in certain cases; for extending the remedies of creditors against the property of debtors; and for amending the laws for the relief of insolvent debtors in England.	The whole act.
5 & 6 Vict. c. 122	Bankruptcy Act 1842	An Act for the amendment of the law of bankruptcy.	The whole act.
7 & 8 Vict. c. 70	Debtors and Creditors Act 1844	An Act for facilitating arrangements between debtors and creditors.	The whole act.
7 & 8 Vict. c. 96	Execution Act 1844	An Act to amend the law of insolvency, bankruptcy and execution.	Sections one to fifty-nine, both inclusive,
8 & 9 Vict. c. 127	Small Debts Act 1845	An Act for the better securing the payment of small debts.	Sections one to seven, both inclusive, and section fifteen.
9 & 10 Vict. c. 95	County Courts Act 1846	An Act for the more easy recovery of small debts and demands in England.	Sections ninety-eight to onc hundred and one, both inclusive.
10 & 11 Vict. c. 102	Bankruptcy, etc. Act 1847	An Act to abolish the Court of Review in Bankruptcy, and to make alterations in the jurisdictions of the Courts of Bankruptcy and Court for Relief of Insolvent Debtors.	The whole act.
11 & 12 Vict. c. 77	Insolvent Debtors, Court Act 1848	An Act to authorize the application of part of the unclaimed money in the Court for the Relief of Insolvent Debtors in enlarging the court-house of the said court.	The whole act.
12 & 13 Vict. c. 106	Bankrupt Law Consolidation Act 1849	The Bankrupt Law Consolidation Act, 1849.	The whole act.
14 & 15 Vict. c. 52	Absconding Debtors Arrest Act 1851	An Act to facilitate the more speedy arrest of absconding debtors.	The whole act.
14 & 15 Vict. c. 83	Court of Chancery Act 1851	An Act to improve the administration of justice in the Court of Chancery, and in the Judicial Committee of the Privy Council.	Section seven, and section ten as far as it relates to matters of bankruptcy.
15 & 16 Vict. c. 77	Bankruptcy Act 1852	An Act to abolish the office of Lord Chancellor’s secretary of bankrupts, and to regulate the office of chief registrar of the Court of Bankruptcy.	The whole act.
16 & 17 Vict. c. 81	Bankruptcy Court Act 1853	An Act to reduce tho salary and emoluments of the registrar of meetings of the Court of Bankruptcy.	The whole act.
17 & 18 Vict. c. 119	Bankruptcy Act 1854	The Bankruptcy Act, 1854.	The whole act.
18 & 19 Vict. c. 15	Judgments Act 1855	An Act for the better protection of purchasers against judgments, Crown debts, cases of lis pendens, and life annuities or rent-charges.	Section ten.
22 & 23 Vict. c. 57	County Courts Act 1859	An Act limiting the power of imprisonment for small debts exercised by the county court judges.	The whole act.
23 & 24 Vict. c. 147	Debtors and Creditors Act 1860	An Act to amend the seventh and eighth Victoria, chapter seventy.	The whole act.
24 & 25 Vict. c. 134	Bankruptcy Act 1861	The Bankruptcy Act, 1861.	The whole act.
25 & 26 Vict. c. 99	Bankruptcy Amendment Act 1862	An Act to amend the Bankruptcy Act, 1861.	Except section four.
31 & 32 Vict. c. 104	Bankruptcy Amendment Act 1868	An Act to amend the Bankruptcy Act, 1861.	The whole act.

=== Short title, commencement, extent ===
Section 1 of the act provided that the act may be cited as "The Bankruptcy Repeal and Insolvent Court Act, 1869"

Section 2 of the act provided that the act would come into force on the same day as the Bankruptcy Act 1869 (32 & 33 Vict. c. 71). (Note: 1 January 1870. See section 3 of the Bankruptcy Act 1869 (32 & 33 Vict. c. 71).)

== Subsequent developments ==
The whole act was repealed by section 1 of, and the first schedule to, the Statute Law Revision (No. 2) Act 1893 (56 & 57 Vict. c. 14), which came into force on 22 September 1893.
