= Bankruptcy Act 1869 =

Act of the Parliament of the United Kingdom

Bankruptcy Act 1869 (Note: Section 1.)
- Act of Parliament
- Parliament of the United Kingdom
- Long title: An Act to consolidate and amend the Law of Bankruptcy.
- Citation: 32 & 33 Vict. c. 71
- Introduced by: Robert Collier MP (Commons)
- Territorial extent: England and Wales; Isle of Man; (Note: Section 2.)

Dates
- Royal assent: 9 August 1869
- Commencement: 1 January 1870 (Note: Section 3.)
- Repealed: England and Wales: 1 January 1884; Isle of Man: 25 July 1991
Other legislation
Amended by	Supreme Court of Judicature Act 1875; Statute Law Revision Act 1883
Repealed by	England and Wales: Bankruptcy Act 1883; Isle of Man: Statute Law Revision (Isle of Man) Act 1991
Relates to	Bankrupt Law Consolidation Act 1849; Debtors Act 1869; Bankruptcy Repeal and Insolvent Court Act 1869; Bankruptcy Act 1883

Status: Repealed

Text of statute as originally enacted

The Bankruptcy Act 1869 (32 & 33 Vict. c. 71) was an act of the Parliament of the United Kingdom that amended and consolidated enactments related to bankruptcy in England and Wales.

== Passage ==
Leave to bring in the Bankruptcy Bill to the House of Commons was granted to the attorney general, Robert Collier MP and the solicitor general, Sir John Coleridge MP on 5 March 1869. The bill had its first reading in the House of Commons on 15 March 1869, presented by the attorney general, Robert Collier MP. The bill had its second reading in the House of Commons on 5 April 1869 and was committed to a committee of the whole house, which met and reported on 26 April 1869, with amendments. The amended bill was re-committed to a committee of the whole house, which met on 3 June 1869, 4 June 1869, 8 June 1869, 11 June 1869, 15 June 1869, 18 June 1869, 22 June 1869 and reported on 25 June 1869, with amendments. The amended bill had its third reading in the House of Commons on 28 June 1869 and passed, without amendments.

The bill had its first reading in the House of Lords on 28 June 1869. The bill had its second reading in the House of Lords on 8 July 1869 and was committed to a committee of the whole house. The committee was discharged and the bill was committed to a select committee on 16 July 1869, which was appointed on 19 July 1869.

Name	Commentary
Richard Bethell, 1st Baron Westbury	
John Romilly, 1st Baron Romilly	
Duncan McNeill, 1st Baron Colonsay	
Hugh Cairns, 1st Earl Cairns	
James Wilde, 1st Baron Penzance	
William Wood, 1st Baron Hatherley	Lord Chancellor
John Wodehouse, 1st Earl of Kimberley	Lord Privy Seal
Charles Wood, 1st Viscount Halifax	
Samuel Jones-Loyd, 1st Baron Overstone	
Edward Strutt, 1st Baron Belper	
Frederic Thesiger, 1st Baron Chelmsford	

The committee reported on 22 July 1869, with amendments. The amended bill was committed to a committee of the whole house, which met on 26 July 1869 and reported on 27 July 1869, with amendments. The amended bill had its third reading in the House of Lords on 30 July 1869 and passed, with amendments.

The amended bill was considered by the House of Commons on 2 August 1869, which agreed with several amendments but not others, for which a committee was appointed to draw up reasons for disagreement.

Name	Commentary
Robert Collier MP	Attorney General
Sir John Coleridge MP	Solicitor General
Henry Bruce MP	Home Secretary
George Goschen MP	
Acton Smee Ayrton|MP	
George Jessel MP	
John Morley MP	
William Rathbone VI MP	

The committee reported on 2 August 1869. The report was considered by the House of Lords on 5 August 1869, with the disagreed amendments not being insisted upon.

The bill was granted royal assent on 9 August 1869.

== Provisions ==
Section 32 of the act established the first statutory regime for preferential debts in bankruptcy, between local rates, taxes, wages and salaries of clerks, servants, labourers and workers.

=== Short title, commencement and extent ===
Section 1 of the act provided that the act may be cited as The Bankruptcy Act, 1869.

Section 2 of the act provided that the act would not extend to Scotland or Ireland unless expressly provided.

Section 3 of the act provided that the act would come into force on 1 January 1870

== Subsequent developments ==
Enactments consolidated by this act were repealed by the Bankruptcy Repeal and Insolvent Court Act 1869 (32 & 33 Vict. c. 83).

The whole act was repealed for England and Wales by section 169(1) of, and the fifth schedule to, the Bankruptcy Act 1883 (46 & 47 Vict. c. 52), which came into force on 1 January 1884.

The whole act was repealed for the Isle of Man by section 1(2) of, and schedule 2 to, the Statute Law Revision (Isle of Man) Act 1991, which came into force on 25 July 1991.

== See also ==
- Bankruptcy in the United Kingdom
- History of bankruptcy law
- United Kingdom insolvency law

== Bibliography ==
- C W Lovesy. The Bankruptcy Act, 1869, The Debtors Act, 1869, The Bankruptcy Repeal and Insolvent Court Act, 1869. Knight & Company. Fleet Street, London. 1870. Google Books
- Henry Philip Roche and William Hazlitt. The Law and Practice in Bankruptcy: Comprising the Bankruptcy Act, 1869; the Debtors Act, 1869; the Insolvent Debtors and Bankruptcy Repeal Act, 1869: Together with the General Rules and Orders in Bankruptcy, at Common Law and in the County Courts: with the Practice on Procedure, Copious Notes, References, and a Very Full Index. Stevens & Haynes. London. 1873. Google Books.
- Henry Philip Roche and William Hazlitt. The Bankruptcy Act, 1869: The Debtors Act, 1869; the Insolvent Debtors and Bankruptcy Repeal Act, 1869. Stevens & Haynes. London. 1870. Google Books
- Treherne, John Thomas. A Practical Treatise on the Bankruptcy Act, 1869, together with so much of the Debtors Act, 1869, and the Bankruptcy Repeal and Insolvent Court Act, 1869, as relates to Bankruptcy. Shaw and Sons. Fetter Lane, London. 1870. Google Books.
- Pitt-Taylor, Frank. The Bankruptcy Act, 1869, and the Debtors Acts, 1869 & 1878. Second Edition. William Maxwell and Son. London. 1880. Google Books.
- John Scott. Costs in Bankruptcy and Liquidation, under the Bankruptcy Act, 1869. Stevens & Sons. 1873. Google Books
- Weightman, Turner Thomas. The New Bankruptcy Act, 1869, together with the Act for the Abolition of Imprisonment for Debt. George Routledge and Sons. London and New York. 1869. Google Books.
- Josiah William Smith. A Manual Relating to Bankruptcy & Insolvency, and Imprisonment for Debt; comprising The New Statute Law. Stevens and Sons. Chancery Lane, London. 1873. Google Books
