= Bankrupt Law Consolidation Act 1849 =

Act of the Parliament of the United Kingdom

Bankrupt Law Consolidation Act 1849 (Note: Section 2.)
- Act of Parliament
- Parliament of the United Kingdom
- Long title: An Act to amend and consolidate the Laws relating to Bankrupts.
- Citation: 12 & 13 Vict. c. 106
- Introduced by: Henry Brougham, 1st Baron Brougham and Vaux (Lords)
- Territorial extent: England and Wales (Note: Section 3.)

Dates
- Royal assent: 1 August 1849
- Commencement: 11 October 1849 (Note: Section 4.)
- Repealed: 1 January 1870

Other legislation
- Amends: See § Repealed enactments
- Repeals/revokes: See § Repealed enactments
- Repealed by: Bankruptcy (Ireland) Act 1849; Bankruptcy Repeal and Insolvent Court Act 1869
- Relates to: Bankruptcy Act 1869; Bankruptcy Act 1883

Status: Repealed

Text of statute as originally enacted

The Bankrupt Law Consolidation Act 1849 (12 & 13 Vict. c. 106) was an act of the Parliament of the United Kingdom that amended and consolidated enactments related to bankruptcy in England and Wales.

== Passage ==
The Bankrupt Law Consolidation Bill had its first reading in the House of Lords on 5 February 1849, presented by Henry Brougham, 1st Baron Brougham and Vaux. The bill had its second reading in the House of Lords on 15 February 1849 and was committed to a committee of the whole house. The committee was discharged on 19 March 1849 and the bill was referred to the Select Committee on Bankruptcy and Insolvency, which reported on 7 May 1849, with amendments. The bill was re-committed to a committee of the whole house, which was discharged on 18 May 1849, when the bill was referred back to the Select Committee on Bankruptcy and Insolvency, which reported on 24 May 1849. The bill was re-committed to a committee of the whole house, which met on 24 May 1849 and reported on 25 May 1849, with amendments. The amended bill was re-committed to a committee of the whole house, which met and reported on 5 June 1849, without amendments. The bill had its third reading in the House of Lords on 7 June 1849 and passed, with amendments.

The bill had its first reading in the House of Commons on 11 June 1849. The bill had its second reading in the House of Commons on 18 June 1849 and was committed to a select committee with the power to send for persons, papers and records, and a quorum of five.

Name	Commentary
John Jervis MP	Attorney General
Robert Walpole MP	
Sir David Dundas MP	Judge Advocate
John Masterman MP	
Thomas Alexander Mitchell MP	
Frederick Peel MP	
Jacob Pleydell-Bouverie, 4th Earl of Radnor MP	
William Miles MP	
John Williams MP	
Joseph Mullings MP	
William Brown MP	
William Thompson MP	
Edmund Denison MP	Discharged on 21 June 1849.
Charles Forster MP	
John Heathcoat MP	
John Abel Smith MP	Appointed on 21 June 1849.
John Arthur Roebuck MP	Appointed on 21 June 1849.
Sir Henry Willoughby MP	Appointed on 21 June 1849.
Sir Edmund Beckett, 4th Baronet MP	Appointed on 21 June 1849.

The committee reported on 24 July 1849, with amendments. The amended bill was committed to a committee of the whole house, which met on 25 July 1849 and reported on 26 July 1849, with amendments. The amended bill had its third reading in the House of Commons on 26 July 1849 and passed, with amendments.

The amended bill was considered and agreed to by the House of Lords on 27 July 1849, with amendments. The amended bill was considered and agreed to by the House of Commons on 31 July 1849, without amendments.

The bill was granted royal assent on 1 August 1849.

== Provisions ==
=== Short title, commencement and extent ===
Section 2 of the act provided that the act may be cited as "The Bankrupt Law Consolidation Act, 1849".

Section 3 of the act provided that nothing in the act would not extend to Scotland or Ireland unless explicitly provided.

Section 4 of the act provided that the act would come into force on 11 October 1849.

=== Repealed enactments ===
Section 1 of the act repealed 11 enactments, listed in schedule A to the act.

Citation	Short title	Title	Extent of repeal
6 Geo. 4. c. 16	Bankruptcy Act 1825	An Act to amend the Laws relating to Bankrupts.	The whole act.
1 & 2 Will. 4. c. 56	Bankruptcy Court (England) Act 1831	An Act to establish a Court of Bankruptcy.	The whole, except as herein-before in the Bankrupt Law Consolidation Act, 1849, is excepted, and except so far as relates to the Appointment, Tenure of Office, and Removal of Commissioners, Registrars, Deputy-Registrars, and Official Assignees of the Court of Bankruptcy, and except so far as the Act prohibits such Commissioners, Registrars, and Deputy Registrars from practising as a Barrister, or being an Attorney or Solicitor, or renders such Commissioners, Registrars, Deputy Registrars, Official Assignees, and the Lord Chancellor's Secretary of Bankrupts incapable of being elected or sitting as a Member of the House of Commons, and except so far as relates to the Grant of Annuities to retired Public Persons whose Offices, Places, Fees, or Emoluments were discontinued and abolished.
3 & 4 Will. 4. c. 47	Court of Bankruptcy (England) Act 1833	An Act to authorize His Majesty to give further Powers to the Judges of the Court of Bankruptcy, and to direct the Times of Sitting of the Judges and Commissioners of the said Court.	The whole act.
1 & 2 Vict. c. 110	Judgments Act 1838	An Act for abolishing Arrest on mesne Process in Civil Actions, except in certain Cases, and for extending the Remedies of Creditors against the Property of Debtors, and for amending the Laws for the Relief of Insolvent Debtors in England.	So far as relates to the Manner of making Petition any Trader within the Meaning of the Laws then in force respecting Bankrupts, upon the filing of an Affidavit or Affidavits or Debt or Debts in the Court of Bankruptcy, and after Notice in Writing requiring immediate Payment of such Debt or Debts.
2 Vict. c. 11	Judgments Act 1839	An Act for the better Protection of Purchasers against Judgments, Crown Debts, Lis pendens, and Fiat in Bankruptcy.	So far as relates to the Protection of Purchasers against secret Acts of Bankruptcy and Fiats in Bankruptcy.
2 & 3 Vict. c. 29	Bankruptcy Act 1839	An Act for the better Protection of Parties dealing with Persons liable to the Bankrupt Laws.	The whole act.
5 & 6 Vict. c. 122	Bankruptcy Act 1842	An Act for the Amendment of the Law of Bankruptcy.	The whole, except as herein-before in the Bankrupt Law Consolidation Act, 1849, is excepted, so far as the Act repeals any other Act or Acts or any Part of any other Act or Acts, and except so far as relates to the Appointment, Tenure of Office, and Removal of additional Commissioners, Deputy Registrars, and Official Assignees to act in the Country, except so far as relates to the Salaries of Commissioners, and except so far as relates to the Transfer of Sale of Part of the Annuity to the Act of Enrolments to the Registrar of the Court acting in Basinghall Street, and except so far as relates to retiring Annuities and Allowances, and except so far as relates to the Allowance of travelling and other Expenses to the Commissioners and Deputy Registrars.
7 & 8 Vict. c. 96	Execution Act 1844	An Act to amend the Law of Insolvency, Bankruptcy, and Executions.	So far as relates to the Powers of the Lord Chancellor to issue Fiat against a Trader upon Petition of the Trader himself, and to attach the Commissioners acting in the Country to any District.
8 & 9 Vict. c. 48	Bankruptcy Act 1845	An Act to substitute a Declaration for an Oath in Cases of Bankruptcy.	So far as relates to England.
10 & 11 Vict. c. 102	Bankruptcy, etc. Act 1847	An Act to abolish the Court of Review in Bankruptcy, to make Alterations in the Jurisdiction between the Court of Bankruptcy and Court for the Relief of Insolvent Debtors.	So far as the Act enacts that all Laws, Orders, and Authorities then in force affecting the Manner of Proceeding in the Court of Review, and appealing to and from that Court, shall continue in force and be applicable to the Jurisdiction of the Vice Chancellor appointed to act in Bankruptcy, and so far as the Act enacts that all Sums and Fees shall continue to be payable and receivable by the like Persons, and to be paid and applied to the like Purposes, as the same had theretofore been paid and received in respect of any Matter in the said Court of Review.
11 & 12 Vict. c. 86	Bankrupts Release Act 1848	An Act to remove the Commissioners of the Court of Bankruptcy to order the Release of Bankrupts from Prison in certain Cases.	The whole act.

== Subsequent developments ==
The act was praised by William Rogers, a member of the Board for the Revision of the Statute Law, for being a model consolidation act.

The whole act was repealed by section 20 of, and the schedule to, the Bankruptcy Repeal and Insolvent Court Act 1869 (32 & 33 Vict. c. 83), which came into force on 1 January 1870.
