= George Kettilby Rickards =

British political economist

Sir George Kettilby Rickards (24 January 1812 – 23 September 1889) was a political economist in England.

Rickards was born in London in 1812, and was the eldest son of George Rickards of Ripley, Surrey, by Frances, daughter of the Rev. Samuel Kettilby, D.D. On 10 July 1823 he was admitted at Westminster School, but left in 1824 for Eton. He matriculated from Balliol College, Oxford (where he was President of the Oxford Union), on 6 April 1829, but was elected scholar of Trinity in the same year. He obtained the Newdigate Prize in 1830 with a poem on the 'African Desert,' graduated B.A. in 1833, taking a second-class in classics, and proceeded M.A. in 1836. From 1836 to 1843, he was a fellow of Queen's College. In 1837, he was called to the bar of the Inner Temple, and in 1873 was elected a bencher. In 1851 he was appointed counsel to the speaker of the House of Commons, and was made K.C.B. on resigning that post in 1882.

Rickards was a member of the Canterbury Association from 11 April 1848, and he joined the management committee in 1851. In 1849, the chief surveyor of the Canterbury Association, Joseph Thomas, named Mount Richards in New Zealand after him.

He was elected Drummond Professor of Political Economy at Oxford in 1851, and he held the chair until 1857. He made little mark in a professorial capacity, but published three general lectures on his subject in a volume in 1852, and a course on population and labour in 1854. For the last seven years of his life, he resided at Fyfield House, Oxford. He died suddenly at Hawkley Hurst, Hampshire, on 23 September 1889.

He was twice married: first, in 1842, to Frances Phoebe, daughter of the Rev. John Henry George Lefroy of Ewshott House, Hampshire, who died in 1859; and, secondly, in 1861, to Julia Cassandra (d. 1884), daughter of the Rev. Benjamin Lefroy, rector of Ashe, Hampshire.

Rickards was the author of:

1. 'Remarks on the Laws relating to Attempts against the Person of the Sovereign,' London, 1842, 8vo.
2. 'The Financial Policy of War,' London, 1855, 8vo.
3. 'The House of Commons, its Struggles and Triumphs: a Lecture,' London, 1856, 8vo.

He translated into blank verse Virgil's 'Æneid,' bks. i.–vi. (1871), and bk. xi. (1872); contributed an essay on 'Church Finance' to Halcombe's 'The Church and her Curates,' London, 1874, 8vo; and assisted to edit the 'Statutes at Large' in 1857 and following years.
