= List of acts of the Parliament of Northern Ireland =

This is a list of acts of the Parliament of Northern Ireland, from its first session in 1921 to suspension in 1972.

From 1922 onwards, the short titles for these acts were distinguished from those passed by the Westminster parliament by the insertion of the bracketed words "Northern Ireland" between the word "act" and the year. Thus the Police Act (Northern Ireland) 1970 was an act passed by the Parliament of Northern Ireland, whereas the Police (Northern Ireland) Act 1998 was passed at Westminster.

As with UK legislation, Northern Ireland's acts of Parliament were traditionally cited using the regnal year(s) of the parliamentary session in which they became law, though in 1954 this was retrospectively changed to calendar years beginning with 1943. Note that by convention "(N.I.)" is also added after the chapter number so as to avoid confusion with Westminster legislation.

Table of contents
1920s	1930s	1940s	1950s	1960s	1970s
	1930	1940
1921	1931	1941
1922	1932	1942
1923	1933	1943
1924	1934	1944
1925	1935	1945
1926	1936	1946
1927	1937	1947
1928	1938	1948
1929	1939	1949

== 1921–1929 ==
=== 1921 ===
The Parliament of Northern Ireland was established on 7 June 1921.

Short title, or popular name	Citation	Royal assent
Long title
Exchequer (Temporary Borrowing) Act 1921 or the Exchequer (Temporary Borrowing) Act (Northern Ireland) 1921	12 Geo. 5. c. 1 (N.I.)	4 October 1921
An Act to authorise the borrowing and repayment of certain sums which have been placed to the credit of the Exchequer of Northern Ireland.
Exchequer and Audit Act 1921 or the Exchequer and Audit Act (Northern Ireland) 1921	12 Geo. 5. c. 2 (N.I.)	4 October 1921
An Act to amend the Law applicable to the Exchequer and Consolidated Fund of Northern Ireland, and to make provision with respect to the Audit of the Accounts of that Fund, the Receipt, Custody, and Issue of Public Moneys, and the Powers, Duties, Tenure of Office and Salary of the Comptroller and Auditor-General for Northern Ireland.
Superannuation Act 1921 or the Superannuation Act (Northern Ireland) 1921	12 Geo. 5. c. 3 (N.I.)	4 October 1921
An Act for the application of the Superannuation Acts, 1834 to 1914, to Officers of the Government and Parliament of Northern Ireland, and for purposes connected therewith.
Interpretation Act 1921 or the Interpretation Act (Northern Ireland) 1921	12 Geo. 5. c. 4 (N.I.)	4 October 1921
An Act to apply certain Enactments respecting the construction of Acts of Parliament to Acts of the Parliament of Northern Ireland.
Local Government (Emergency Powers) Act 1921 (N.I.) or the Local Government (Emergency Powers) Act (Northern Ireland) 1921	12 Geo. 5. c. 5 (N.I.)	14 December 1921
An Act to make further provision for the exercise of the powers and the performance of the duties of County and District Councils and Town Commissioners and their Committees, and for purposes connected therewith.
Ministries of Northern Ireland Act 1921 (N.I.) or the Ministries of Northern Ireland Act (Northern Ireland) 1921	12 Geo. 5. c. 6 (N.I.)	14 December 1921
An Act to provide for the administration of certain public services in Northern Ireland by the Departments established by the Lord Lieutenant, and for purposes connected therewith.
Speaker of the Senate Act 1921 (N.I.) or the Speaker of the Senate Act (Northern Ireland) 1921 (repealed)	12 Geo. 5. c. 7 (N.I.)	14 December 1921
An Act to provide for the payment of a Salary to the Speaker of the Senate. (Repealed by Northern Ireland (Modification of Enactments—No. 1) Order 1973 (SI 1973/2163))
Speaker of the House of Commons Act 1921 (N.I.) or the Speaker of the House of Commons Act (Northern Ireland) 1921 (repealed)	12 Geo. 5. c. 8 (N.I.)	14 December 1921
An Act to provide for the payment of a Salary to the Speaker of the House of Commons. (Repealed by Northern Ireland (Modification of Enactments—No. 1) Order 1973 (SI 1973/2163))
Salaries of Ministerial Offices Act 1921 (N.I.) or the Salaries of Ministerial Offices Act (Northern Ireland) 1921	12 Geo. 5. c. 9 (N.I.)	14 December 1921
An Act to regulate the Salaries to be paid to Ministers of Northern Ireland, Parliamentary Secretaries and Assistant Parliamentary Secretaries of Departments of the Government of Northern Ireland and the Attorney General for Northern Ireland.
Appropriation Act 1921 (N.I.) or the Appropriation Act (Northern Ireland) 1921	12 Geo. 5. c. 10 (N.I.)	14 December 1921
An Act to apply a Sum out of the Consolidated Fund of Northern Ireland, and certain Issues made from the Exchequer of Northern Ireland by the Lord Lieutenant, to the service of the period ending on the thirty-first day of March, nineteen hundred and twenty-two, and to appropriate the Supplies of this Session of Parliament.

==== Sources ====
- The Public General Acts of 1921 passed in the Twelfth Year of the Reign of His Majesty King George the Fifth, being the First Session of the First Parliament of Northern Ireland. Belfast: William Richard Codling – via Google Books.

=== 1922 ===
==== Public acts ====
Short title, or popular name	Citation	Royal assent
Long title
Consolidated Fund Act (Northern Ireland) 1922	12 & 13 Geo. 5. c. 1 (N.I.)	29 March 1922
An Act to apply certain Sums out of the Consolidated Fund of Northern Ireland to the service of the period ending on the thirty-first day of March, nineteen hundred and twenty-two, and of the year ending on the thirty-first day of March, nineteen hundred and twenty three.
Superannuation Act (Northern Ireland) 1922	12 & 13 Geo. 5. c. 2 (N.I.)	4 April 1922
An Act to amend the Superannuation Act, 1921. (Note: Superannuation Act 1921 (12 Geo. 5. c. 3 (N.I.)))
Exchequer Borrowing and Local Loans Act (Northern Ireland) 1922	12 & 13 Geo. 5. c. 3 (N.I.)	4 April 1922
An Act to empower the Ministry of Finance to raise money for certain purposes, and to issue sums for Local Loans and for temporary investment.
Unemployment Fund Act (Northern Ireland) 1922	12 & 13 Geo. 5. c. 4 (N.I.)	4 April 1922
An Act to enable the Ministry of Finance to make advances for discharging the liabilities of the Northern Irish unemployment fund.
Civil Authorities (Special Powers) Act (Northern Ireland) 1922 (repealed)	12 & 13 Geo. 5. c. 5 (N.I.)	7 April 1922
An Act to empower certain authorities of the Government of Northern Ireland to take steps for preserving the peace and maintaining order in Northern Ireland, and for purposes connected therewith. (Repealed by Northern Ireland (Emergency Provisions) Act 1973 (c. 53)
Criminal Procedure Act (Northern Ireland) 1922	12 & 13 Geo. 5. c. 6 (N.I.)	13 April 1922
An Act to make special provision for the trial of persons charged with serious crimes in Northern Ireland. and for purposes connected therewith.
Unemployment Insurance Act (Northern Ireland) 1922 (repealed)	12 & 13 Geo. 5. c. 7 (N.I.)	13 April 1922
An Act to amalgamate the rates of contribution and the rates of benefit under the Unemployment Insurance Acts, 1920 (Note: Unemployment Insurance Act 1920 (10 & 11 Geo. 5. c. 30)) and 1921, (Note: Unemployment Insurance Act 1921 (11 & 12 Geo. 5. c. 1)) and the Unemployed Workers' Dependants (Temporary Provision) Act, 1921, (Note: Unemployed Workers' Dependants (Temporary Provision) Act 1921 (11 & 12 Geo. 5. c. 62)) in their application to Northern Ireland, otherwise to amend the Unemployment Insurance Acts, 1920 and 1921, and to repeal the Unemployed Workers' Dependants (Temporary Provision) Act, 1921, in their application as aforesaid, and for purposes connected therewith. (Repealed by Unemployment Insurance Act (Northern Ireland) 1923 (13 & 14 Geo. 5. c. 11 (N.I.))
Constabulary Act (Northern Ireland) 1922 (repealed)	12 & 13 Geo. 5. c. 8 (N.I.)	31 May 1922
An Act to provide for the establishment, management and control of the Royal Ulster Constabulary, and to amend the law with respect to the appointment of Resident Magistrates and Special Constables in Northern Ireland, and for purposes connected therewith. (Repealed by Police (Northern Ireland) Act 1998 (c. 32)
Referees and Arbitrators (Procedure) Act (Northern Ireland) 1922	12 & 13 Geo. 5. c. 9 (N.I.)	20 June 1922
An Act to amend section thirty-three of the Finance (1909-10) Act, 1910, (Note: Finance (1909-10) Act 1910 (10 Edw. 7. & 1 Geo. 5. c. 8)) and the Acquisition of Land (Assessment of Compensation) Act, 1919, (Note: Acquisition of Land (Assessment of Compensation) Act 1919 (9 & 10 Geo. 5. c. 57)) in their application to Northern Ireland.
Joint Nursing and Midwives Council Act (Northern Ireland) 1922	12 & 13 Geo. 5. c. 10 (N.I.)	
An Act to make provision for the establishment of a Joint Council in Northern Ireland for the purposes of the Midwives (Ireland) Act, 1918, (Note: Midwives (Ireland) Act 1918 (7 & 8 Geo. 5. c. 59)) and the Nurses Registration (Ireland) Act, 1919, (Note: Nurses Registration (Ireland) Act 1919 (9 & 10 Geo. 5. c. 96)) and for purposes connected therewith.
Motor Vehicle Races Act (Northern Ireland) 1922 or the Road Races Act 1922	12 & 13 Geo. 5. c. 11 (N.I.)	10 June 1922
An Act to provide for the Authorisation of Races with Motor Vehicles in Northern Ireland.
Live Stock Breeding Act (Northern Ireland) 1922	12 & 13 Geo. 5. c. 12 (N.I.)	5 July 1922
An Act to make provision for the licensing of bulls and for the improvement of the breed of certain classes of live stock in Northern Ireland.
Church Temporalities Fund Act (Northern Ireland) 1922	12 & 13 Geo. 5. c. 13 (N.I.)	5 July 1922
An Act to make provision for the management, administration and disposition of the part of the Irish Church Temporalities Fund apportioned to the Government of Northern Ireland, and for purposes connected herewith.
Appropriation Act (Northern Ireland) 1922	12 & 13 Geo. 5. c. 14 (N.I.)	5 July 1922
An Act to apply a Sum of the Consolidated Fund of Northern Ireland to the service of the year ending on the thirty-first day of March, nineteen hundred and twenty-three, and to appropriate the Supplies granted in this Session of Parliament.
National Health Insurance Act (Northern Ireland) 1922 (repealed)	12 & 13 Geo. 5. c. 15 (N.I.)	5 July 1922
An Act to make further provision with respect to the expenses of the administration of benefits under the Acts relating to National Health Insurance in Northern Ireland, to amend section twenty-nine of the National Health Insurance Act, 1918, (Note: National Health Insurance Act 1918 (7 & 8 Geo. 5. c. 62)) in its application to Northern Ireland, and for purposes connected therewith. (Repealed by (National Health Insurance Act 1936 (26 Geo. 5 & 1 Edw. 8. c. 32))
Local Government Act (Northern Ireland) 1922	12 & 13 Geo. 5. c. 16 (N.I.)	11 September 1922
An Act to amend the Law relating to Local Government in Northern Ireland, and for purposes connected therewith.
Unemployment Insurance (Amendment) Act (Northern Ireland) 1922 (repealed)	12 & 13 Geo. 5. c. 17 (N.I.)	26 October 1922
An Act to amend section four of the Unemployment Insurance Act (Northern Ireland), 1922. (Note: Unemployment Insurance Act (Northern Ireland) 1922 (12 & 13 Geo. 5. c. 7 (N.I.))) (Repealed by (Unemployment Insurance Act (Northern Ireland) 1923 (13 & 14 Geo. 5. c. 11 (N.I.)))
Finance Act (Northern Ireland) 1922	12 & 13 Geo. 5. c. 18 (N.I.)	26 October 1922
An Act to amend the Law relating to certain Duties of Inland Revenue (including Excise) and to alter other Duties payable in Northern Ireland.
Solicitors Act (Northern Ireland) 1922	12 & 13 Geo. 5. c. 19 (N.I.)	26 October 1922
An Act to provide for the carrying into execution of certain enactments of the Solicitors (Ireland) Act, 1898, (Note: Solicitors (Ireland) Act 1898 (61 & 62 Vict. c. 17)) by the Incorporated Law Society of Northern Ireland, and to amend the said Act in its application to Northern Ireland.
Uniformity of Laws Act (Northern Ireland) 1922	12 & 13 Geo. 5. c. 20 (N.I.)	26 October 1922
An Act to apply to Northern Ireland certain Acts passed by the Parliament of the United Kingdom in the present Session thereof.
Expiring Laws Act (Northern Ireland) 1922 (repealed)	12 & 13 Geo. 5. c. 21 (N.I.)	2 November 1922
An Act to deal with certain Expiring Laws as respects Northern Ireland, by making some of them permanent, repealing others and continuing the remainder for a limited period. (Repealed by Statute Law Revision (Northern Ireland) Act 1973 (c. 55))
Local Authorities (Elections and Constitution) (Northern Ireland) Act 1922	12 & 13 Geo. 5. c. 22 (N.I.)	2 November 1922
An Act to postpone Elections of County and Rural District Councillors and Guardians in Northern Ireland, and of the Belfast City and District Water Commissioners, and to remove difficulties with respect to the constitution of certain Local Authorities.
Appropriation (No. 2) Act (Northern Ireland) 1922	12 & 13 Geo. 5. c. 23 (N.I.)	14 December 1922
An Act to apply a Sum out of the Consolidated Fund of Northern Ireland to the service of the year ending on the thirty-first day of March, nineteen hundred and twenty-three, and to appropriate the further Supplies granted in this Session of Parliament.
Loans Guarantee Act (Northern Ireland) 1922	12 & 13 Geo. 5. c. 24 (N.I.)	14 December 1922
An Act to authorise the Ministry of Finance for Northern Ireland to guarantee the payment of Loans to be applied towards or in connection with the carrying out of capital undertakings calculated to promote employment in Northern Ireland.

==== Local acts ====
Short title, or popular name	Citation	Royal assent
Long title
Belfast Harbour Act (Northern Ireland) 1922	12 & 13 Geo. 5. c. i (N.I.)	31 May 1922
An Act to extend the Borrowing Powers of the Belfast Harbour Commissioners and for other purposes.
Londonderry Bridge Act (Northern Ireland) 1922	12 & 13 Geo. 5. c. ii (N.I.)	14 December 1922
An Act to authorise the Londonderry Bridge Commissioners to borrow money for amongst other purposes the painting, strengthening and repair of the Londonderry Bridge; (Note: Carlisle Bridge, Londonderry.) and for other purposes.

==== Sources ====
- The Public General Acts of 1922 passed in the Twelfth and Thirteenth Year of the Reign of His Majesty King George the Fifth, being the Second Session of the First Parliament of Northern Ireland. Belfast: William Richard Codling – via Google Books.

=== 1923 ===
==== Public acts ====
Short title, or popular name	Citation	Royal assent
Long title
Canals (Continuance of Charging Powers) Act (Northern Ireland) 1923	13 & 14 Geo. 5. c. 1 (N.I.)	29 March 1923
An Act for the continuance of Charging Powers in respect of Canal or Inland Navigation Undertakings in Northern Ireland of which possession was retained or taken by the Ministry of Transport under the Ministry of Transport Act, 1919. (Note: Ministry of Transport Act 1919 (9 & 10 Geo. 5. c. 50))
Inspectors of Weights and Measures Act (Northern Ireland) 1923	13 & 14 Geo. 5. c. 2 (N.I.)	29 March 1923
An Act to authorise the employment of additional Inspectors for the purposes of the Weights and Measures Acts, 1878 to 1919.
Consolidated Fund and Appropriation Act (Northern Ireland) 1923	13 & 14 Geo. 5. c. 3 (N.I.)	29 March 1923
An Act to apply certain Sums out of the Consolidated Fund of Northern Ireland to the service of the period ended on the thirty-first day of March, nineteen hundred and twenty-two, and of the years ending on the thirty-first day of March, nineteen hundred and twenty-three, and the thirty-first day of March, nineteen hundred and twenty-four, and to make further provision with respect to the appropriation of certain supplies granted by Parliament for the service of the year ending on the thirty-first day of March, nineteen hundred and twenty-three.
Exchequer and Financial Provisions Act (Northern Ireland) 1923	13 & 14 Geo. 5. c. 4 (N.I.)	29 March 1923
An Act to provide for the application of credit balances in the Exchequer of Northern Ireland; to charge certain sums upon the Consolidated Fund of Northern Ireland; to extend the powers of the Ministry of Finance with respect to Capital Moneys and the making of Loans; to amend the Law with respect to the preparation, examination and presentation to Parliament of Accounts; and for purposes connected therewith.
Petty Sessions Fees and Administration Act (Northern Ireland) 1923	13 & 14 Geo. 5. c. 5 (N.I.)	10 May 1923
An Act to amend the Petty Sessions Clerk (Ireland) Act, 1858, (Note: Petty Sessions Clerk (Ireland) Act 1858 (21 & 22 Vict. c. 100)) and the Dogs Regulation (Ireland) Act, 1865, (Note: Dogs Regulation (Ireland) Act 1865 (28 & 29 Vict. c. 50)) in their application to Northern Ireland.
Companies (Reconstitution of Records) Act (Northern Ireland) 1923 (repealed)	13 & 14 Geo. 5. c. 6 (N.I.)	10 May 1923
An Act to provide for the Reconstitution of the Records relating to certain Companies having Registered Offices in Northern Ireland. (Repealed by Statute Law Revision (Northern Ireland) Act 1976 (c. 12)
Promissory Oaths Act (Northern Ireland) 1923	13 & 14 Geo. 5. c. 7 (N.I.)	10 May 1923
An Act to amend the Law relating to Promissory Oaths in its application to Northern Ireland.
Criminal Law Amendment Act (Northern Ireland) 1923	13 & 14 Geo. 5. c. 8 (N.I.)	10 May 1923
An Act to amend the law in Northern Ireland with respect to offences against persons under the age of sixteen, and with respect to penalties under section thirteen of the Criminal Law Amendment Act, 1885. (Note: Criminal Law Amendment Act 1885 (48 & 49 Vict. c. 69))
Criminal Evidence Act (Northern Ireland) 1923	13 & 14 Geo. 5. c. 9 (N.I.)	10 May 1923
An Act to amend the Law of Evidence in its application to Northern Ireland.
Local Government (Roads) Act (Northern Ireland) 1923	13 & 14 Geo. 5. c. 10 (N.I.)	10 May 1923
An Act to amend the Law with respect to Road Expenditure in Northern Ireland, and the procedure in connection therewith.
Unemployment Insurance Act (Northern Ireland) 1923	13 & 14 Geo. 5. c. 11 (N.I.)	30 May 1923
An Act to amend the provisions of the Unemployment Insurance Acts (Northern Ireland), 1920 to 1922, relating to special periods the period of benefit and the conditions for the receipt of benefit, to provide for continuing the existing rates of benefit and for making consequential alterations in the rates of contributions, to increase the total amount of advances which may be made by the Ministry of Finance for the Northern Irish unemployment fund, and otherwise to amend the said Acts.
Intoxicating Liquor Act (Northern Ireland) 1923	13 & 14 Geo. 5. c. 12 (N.I.)	15 June 1923
An Act to make provision for the closing on Sunday and Christmas Day of certain premises licensed for the sale of intoxicating liquor, the abolition of certain off-licences, and the settlement of claims for compensation arising thereout; to impose restrictions on the sale of methylated spirits; and to amend the law relating to the sale and supply of intoxicating liquor by retail; and for purposes connected therewith.
Local Government (Franchise) Act (Northern Ireland) 1923	13 & 14 Geo. 5. c. 13 (N.I.)	22 June 1923
An Act to amend the Representation of the People Act, 1918, (Note: Representation of the People Act 1918 (7 & 8 Geo. 5. c. 64)) in its application to Local Government Franchises in Northern Ireland.
Double Taxation Relief Act (Northern Ireland) 1923	13 & 14 Geo. 5. c. 14 (N.I.)	22 June 1923
An Act to give the force of Law to the consent of the Government of Northern Ireland to certain arrangements for Relief in respect of Double Taxation as between Northern Ireland and the Irish Free State.
Loans Guarantee (Amendment) Act (Northern Ireland) 1923	13 & 14 Geo. 5. c. 15 (N.I.)	22 June 1923
An Act to amend section one of the Loans Guarantee Act (Northern Ireland), 1922. (Note: Loans Guarantee Act (Northern Ireland) 1922 (12 & 13 Geo. 5. c. 24 (N.I.)))
Increase of Rent and Mortgage Interest Restrictions (Continuance) Act (Northern Ireland) 1923	13 & 14 Geo. 5. c. 16 (N.I.)	22 June 1923
An Act to continue as respects Northern Ireland the Increase of Rent and Mortgage Interest (Restrictions) Act, 1920, (Note: Increase of Rent and Mortgage Interest (Restrictions) Act 1920 (10 & 11 Geo. 5. c. 17)) until the twenty-fourth day of December, nineteen hundred and twenty-three.
Scutch Mills Act (Northern Ireland) 1923	13 & 14 Geo. 5. c. 17 (N.I.)	22 June 1923
An Act to regulate the disposal of by products of flax scutching at Scutch Mills in Northern Ireland, and the conduct of business in connection with flax scutching.
Office of Attorney-General Act (Northern Ireland) 1923 (repealed)	13 & 14 Geo. 5. c. 18 (N.I.)	22 June 1923
An Act to make further provision with respect to the salary of the office of Attorney-General for Northern Ireland, and with respect to the execution of the said office. (Repealed by Northern Ireland (Modification of Enactments—No. 1) Order 1973 (SI 1973/2163))
Land Trust (Powers) Act (Northern Ireland) 1923 (repealed)	13 & 14 Geo. 5. c. 19 (N.I.)	22 June 1923
An Act to enable the Irish Sailors and Soldiers' Land Trust to carry out in Northern Ireland the purposes for which it has been established by law. (Repealed by Irish Sailors and Soldiers Land Trust Act 1987 (c. 48))
Public Records Act (Northern Ireland) 1923	13 & 14 Geo. 5. c. 20 (N.I.)	22 June 1923
An Act to establish a Public Record Office of Northern Ireland for the reception and preservation of certain public records appertaining to Northern Ireland, and for purposes connected therewith.
Education Act (Northern Ireland) 1923	13 & 14 Geo. 5. c. 21 (N.I.)	22 June 1923
An Act to establish local authorities for education in Northern Ireland; to make better provision therein as respects education, school attendance, the employment of children and young persons, the health and welfare of school children and afflicted children, and the training and employment of school teachers; and for purposes connected therewith.
Appropriation Act (Northern Ireland) 1923	13 & 14 Geo. 5. c. 22 (N.I.)	22 June 1923
An Act to apply a Sum out of the Consolidated Fund of Northern Ireland to the service of the year ending on the thirty-first day of March, nineteen hundred and twenty-four, and to appropriate the Supplies granted in this Session of Parliament.
Labourers Act (Northern Ireland) 1923	13 & 14 Geo. 5. c. 23 (N.I.)	27 November 1923
An Act to provide for the making of grants in aid of the repayment of certain loans and advances to rural district councils under the Labourers (Ireland) Acts, 1883 to 1919.
Electricity and Gas (Expenses) Act (Northern Ireland) 1923	13 & 14 Geo. 5. c. 24 (N.I.)	27 November 1923
An Act to amend section twenty-nine of the Electricity (Supply) Act, 1919, (Note: Electricity (Supply) Act 1919 (9 & 10 Geo. 5. c. 100)) and section seven of the Gas Regulation Act, 1920, (Note: Gas Regulation Act 1920 (10 & 11 Geo. 5. c. 28)) in their application to Northern Ireland, and for purposes connected therewith.
Expiring Laws Continuance Act (Northern Ireland) 1923	13 & 14 Geo. 5. c. 25 (N.I.)	27 November 1923
An Act to continue certain Expiring Laws as respects Northern Ireland.
Finance Act (Northern Ireland) 1923	13 & 14 Geo. 5. c. 26 (N.I.)	27 November 1923
An Act to amend the Law relating to certain Duties of Inland Revenue (including Excise), to alter other Duties and to make further provision in connection with Finance.
Appropriation (No. 2) Act (Northern Ireland) 1923	13 & 14 Geo. 5. c. 27 (N.I.)	27 November 1923
An Act to apply a Sum out of the Consolidated Fund of Northern Ireland to the service of the year ending on the thirty-first day of March, nineteen hundred and twenty-four, and to appropriate the further Supplies granted in this Session of Parliament.
Superannuation Act (Northern Ireland) 1923	13 & 14 Geo. 5. c. 28 (N.I.)	27 November 1923
An Act to give the force of Law to certain arrangements made by the Treasury of the United Kingdom with the Government of Northern Ireland, pursuant to sub-section (2) of section seven of the Irish Free State (Consequential Provisions) Act, 1922 (Session 2), (Note: Irish Free State (Consequential Provisions) Act 1922 (Session 2) (13 Geo. 5 Sess. 2. c. 2)) and to amend the Superannuation Acts (Northern Ireland), 1921 (Note: Superannuation Act 1921 (12 Geo. 5. c. 3 (N.I.))) and 1922. (Note: Superannuation Act (Northern Ireland) 1922 (12 & 13 Geo. 5. c. 2 (N.I.)))
Constabulary Act (Northern Ireland) 1923	13 & 14 Geo. 5. c. 29 (N.I.)	27 November 1923
An Act to enable certain special constables to be appointed as members of the Royal Ulster Constabulary.
Housing Act (Northern Ireland) 1923	13 & 14 Geo. 5. c. 30 (N.I.)	27 November 1923
An Act to amend the enactments relating to the Housing of the Working Classes and the Acquisition of Small Dwellings in Northern Ireland.
Local Government Act (Northern Ireland) 1923	13 & 14 Geo. 5. c. 31 (N.I.)	27 November 1923
An Act to amend the Law relating to Local Government in Northern Ireland, and for purposes connected therewith.
Trade Boards Act (Northern Ireland) 1923	13 & 14 Geo. 5. c. 32 (N.I.)	27 November 1923
An Act to consolidate and amend the Law relating to Trade Boards in Northern Ireland.
Workmen's Compensation Act (Northern Ireland) 1923 (repealed)	13 & 14 Geo. 5. c. 33 (N.I.)	27 November 1923
An Act to amend the Workmen's Compensation Act, 1906, (Note: Workmen's Compensation Act 1906 (6 Edw. 7. c. 58)) and the Acts amending that Act, and to amend the law with respect to employers' liability insurance, the notification of accidents, first aid, and ambulance. (Repealed by Statute Law Revision (Northern Ireland) Act 1980 (c. 59)

==== Local acts ====
Short title, or popular name	Citation	Royal assent
Long title
Belfast Water Act (Northern Ireland) 1923	13 & 14 Geo. 5. c. i (N.I.)	22 June 1923
An Act to confer further Powers on the Belfast City and District Water Commissioners.
Basil McCrea Endowments Act (Northern Ireland) 1923	13 & 14 Geo. 5. c. ii (N.I.)	22 June 1923
An Act to enable the Trusts of the Will of Basil McCrea with respect to the establishment and endowment of certain Professorships Lectureships and Scholarships in the McCrea Magee Presbyterian College Londonderry to be carried out and for the alteration and modification of the said Trusts and for other purposes.
Bangor Gas Provisional Order Confirmation Act (Northern Ireland) 1923	13 & 14 Geo. 5. c. iii (N.I.)	22 June 1923
An Act to confirm a Provisional Order of the Ministry of Home Affairs for Northern Ireland relating to the Urban District of Bangor.
	Bangor Gas Order 1923 Provisional Order to alter and amend the Bangor (County Down) Water and Improvement Act, 1905. (Note: Bangor (County Down) Water and Improvement Act 1905 (5 Edw. 7. c. cxcvi))	
Belfast Corporation Act (Northern Ireland) 1923	13 & 14 Geo. 5. c. iv (N.I.)	22 June 1923
An Act to empower The Right Honourable the Lord Mayor Aldermen and Citizens of the City of Belfast to construct and work Additional Tramways within and outside the City and to execute certain Works; To confer further powers upon the Corporation with reference to their Gas Undertaking and in relation to Public Health and Sanitary Matters and to the Good Government of the City; and for other purposes.

==== Sources ====
- The Public General Acts of 1923 passed in the Thirteenth and Fourteenth Years of the Reign of His Majesty King George the Fifth, being the Third Session of the First Parliament of Northern Ireland. Belfast: William Richard Codling – via Google Books.

=== 1924 ===
==== Public acts ====
Short title, or popular name	Citation	Royal assent
Long title
Consolidated Fund Act (Northern Ireland) 1924	14 & 15 Geo. 5. c. 1 (N.I.)	31 March 1924
An Act to apply certain Sums out of the Consolidated Fund of Northern Ireland to the service of the year ended on the thirty-first day of March, nineteen hundred and twenty-three, and of the years ending on the thirty-first day of March, nineteen hundred and twenty-four, and the thirty-first day of March nineteen hundred and twenty-five.
Loans Guarantee Act (Northern Ireland) 1924	14 & 15 Geo. 5. c. 2 (N.I.)	12 April 1924
An Act to amend the Loans Guarantee Act (Northern Ireland), 1922, (Note: Loans Guarantee Act (Northern Ireland) 1922 (12 & 13 Geo. 5. c. 24 (N.I.))) by increasing the amount of loans which may be guaranteed under that Act as amended by subsequent enactments, (Note: Loans Guarantee (Amendment) Act (Northern Ireland) 1923 (13 & 14 Geo. 5. c. 15 (N.I.))) (Note: Finance Act (Northern Ireland) 1923 (13 & 14 Geo. 5. c. 26 (N.I.))) and extending the period for the giving of guarantees thereunder.
Unemployment Insurance Act (Northern Ireland) 1924	14 & 15 Geo. 5. c. 3 (N.I.)	12 April 1924
An Act to extend the powers of the Ministry of Labour to authorise the receipt of benefit in the first benefit year under section four of the Unemployment Insurance Act (Northern Ireland), 1922, (Note: Unemployment Insurance Act (Northern Ireland) 1922 (12 & 13 Geo. 5. c. 7 (N.I.))) as amended by the Unemployment Insurance Act (Northern Ireland), 1923, (Note: Unemployment Insurance Act (Northern Ireland) 1923 (13 & 14 Geo. 5. c. 11 (N.I.))) and to apply those powers to the authorisation of benefit in the next subsequent benefit year; and for purposes connected therewith.
Dangerous Drugs and Poisons (Amendment) Act (Northern Ireland) 1924	14 & 15 Geo. 5. c. 4 (N.I.)	27 May 1924
An Act to amend the Dangerous Drugs Act, 1920, (Note: Dangerous Drugs Act 1920 (10 & 11 Geo. 5. c. 46)) and section two of the Poisons (Ireland) Act, 1870, (Note: Poisons (Ireland) Act 1870 (33 & 34 Vict. c. 26)) in their application to Northern Ireland.
Explosives Act (Northern Ireland) 1924 (repealed)	14 & 15 Geo. 5. c. 5 (N.I.)	27 May 1924
An Act to amend the Explosives Act, 1875, (Note: Explosives Act 1875 (38 & 39 Vict. c. 17)) in its application to Northern Ireland. (Repealed by Manufacture and Storage of Explosives Regulations (Northern Ireland) 2006 (SI 2006/425))
Local Government (Financial Provisions) Act (Northern Ireland) 1924	14 & 15 Geo. 5. c. 6 (N.I.)	27 May 1924
An Act to amend Article 22 of the Schedule to the Local Government (Application of Enactments) Order, 1898, (Note: Local Government (Application of Enactments) Order 1898 (SR&O 1899/1120)) and section ten of the Local Government Act (Northern Ireland), 1923. (Note: Local Government Act (Northern Ireland) 1923 (13 & 14 Geo. 5. c. 31 (N.I.)))
Char-a-banc Regulation Act (Northern Ireland) 1924	14 & 15 Geo. 5. c. 7 (N.I.)	29 May 1924
An Act to extend to Char-a-bancs certain provisions of the Towns Improvement (Ireland) Act, 1854, (Note: Towns Improvement (Ireland) Act 1854 (17 & 18 Vict. c. 103)) with respect to Hackney Carriages, and for other purposes connected with the regulation of Char-a-bancs.
Commissions of the Peace Act (Northern Ireland) 1924	14 & 15 Geo. 5. c. 8 (N.I.)	29 May 1924
An Act for simplifying the preparation and authentication of Commissions of the Peace, for prescribing the fees to be paid by Justices of the Peace in respect of their appointments, and for other purposes connected therewith.
Private Bill Procedure Act (Northern Ireland) 1924 (repealed)	14 & 15 Geo. 5. c. 9 (N.I.)	29 May 1924
An Act to give full effect to certain enactments in their application to Private Bill Procedure in the Parliament of Northern Ireland, and to make further provision with respect thereto. (Repealed by Northern Ireland (Modification of Enactments—No. 1) Order 1999 (SI 1999/663)
Public Libraries Act (Northern Ireland) 1924	14 & 15 Geo. 5. c. 10 (N.I.)	29 May 1924
An Act to amend the Public Libraries (Ireland) Acts, 1855 to 1920, in their application to Northern Ireland, and for other purposes incidental thereto.
Ministers (Temporary Exercise of Powers) Act (Northern Ireland) 1924 (repealed)	14 & 15 Geo. 5. c. 11 (N.I.)	29 May 1924
An Act to make provision for the temporary exercise of the powers of Ministers of Northern Ireland. (Repealed by Northern Ireland Act 1998 (c. 47)
Appropriation Act (Northern Ireland) 1924	14 & 15 Geo. 5. c. 12 (N.I.)	29 May 1924
An Act to apply a Sum out of the Consolidated Fund of Northern Ireland to the service of the year ending on the thirty-first day of March, nineteen hundred and twenty-five, and to appropriate the Supplies granted in this Session of Parliament.
Exchequer and Financial Provisions Act (Northern Ireland) 1924	14 & 15 Geo. 5. c. 13 (N.I.)	29 May 1924
An Act to establish a special Capital Fund and to charge sums upon the Consolidated Fund of Northern Ireland for the provision or improvement of buildings for certain public purposes; to extend the powers of the Ministry of Finance with respect to the investment of moneys and the making of loans; and for other purposes connected therewith.
Unemployment Insurance (Temporary Provisions) Act (Northern Ireland) 1924	14 & 15 Geo. 5. c. 14 (N.I.)	29 May 1924
An Act to empower the Governor of Northern Ireland to make temporary provision by Order in Council for the amendment of the Unemployment Insurance Acts (Northern Ireland), 1920 to 1924.
Marketing of Eggs Act (Northern Ireland) 1924	14 & 15 Geo. 5. c. 15 (N.I.)	29 May 1924
An Act to make provision for the licensing of wholesale dealers in eggs, the registration of premises where eggs are preserved, the better testing, grading and packing of eggs, and the better prevention of the sale of eggs unfit for human food; and for other purposes connected therewith.
National Health Insurance Act (Northern Ireland) 1924 (repealed)	14 & 15 Geo. 5. c. 16 (N.I.)	29 May 1924
An Act to make further provision with respect to the expenses of the administration of certain benefits under the Acts relating to National Health Insurance in Northern Ireland, and to amend section twenty-nine of the National Health Insurance Act, 1918, (Note: National Health Insurance Act 1918 (7 & 8 Geo. 5. c. 62)) and for purposes connected therewith. (Repealed by (National Health Insurance Act 1936 (26 Geo. 5 & 1 Edw. 8. c. 32))
Constabulary (Acquisition of Land) Act (Northern Ireland) 1924	14 & 15 Geo. 5. c. 17 (N.I.)	29 May 1924
An Act to empower the Ministry of Home Affairs to acquire land and buildings for Constabulary purposes.
Unemployment Fund Act (Northern Ireland) 1924	14 & 15 Geo. 5. c. 18 (N.I.)	9 October 1924
An Act to enable the Ministry of Finance to make further advances for discharging the liabilities of the Northern Irish Unemployment Fund.
Finance Act (Northern Ireland) 1924	14 & 15 Geo. 5. c. 19 (N.I.)	7 November 1924
An Act to amend the Law relating to certain Duties of Inland Revenue (including Excise), and to make further provision with respect to the cessation of, and relief from, certain Duties, and with respect to Finance.
Assurance Companies Act (Northern Ireland) 1924	14 & 15 Geo. 5. c. 20 (N.I.)	7 November 1924
An Act to amend, and remove doubts as to certain provisions of the Assurance Companies Act, 1909, (Note: Assurance Companies Act 1909 (9 Edw. 7. c. 49)) as they apply in Northern Ireland.
Industrial Assurance Act (Northern Ireland) 1924	14 & 15 Geo. 5. c. 21 (N.I.)	7 November 1924
An Act to consolidate and amend the law in Northern Ireland relating to Industrial Assurance, and to make provision therein with respect to assurances on children's lives, war bond policies and policies to which the Courts (Emergency Powers) Act, 1914, (Note: Courts (Emergency Powers) Act 1914 (4 & 5 Geo. 5. c. 78)) applies, and bond investment business.
Deceased Brother's Widow's Marriage Act (Northern Ireland) 1924	14 & 15 Geo. 5. c. 22 (N.I.)	7 November 1924
An Act to remove doubts as to the application of the Deceased Brother's Widow's Marriage Act, 1921, (Note: Deceased Brother's Widow's Marriage Act 1921 (11 & 12 Geo. 5. c. 24)) to Northern Ireland.
Expiring Laws Continuance Act (Northern Ireland) 1924	14 & 15 Geo. 5. c. 23 (N.I.)	7 November 1924
An Act to continue certain Expiring Laws as respects Northern Ireland.
Time Act (Northern Ireland) 1924	14 & 15 Geo. 5. c. 24 (N.I.)	7 November 1924
An Act to make provision for the permanent adoption in Northern Ireland of the Time adopted for use in Great Britain.
Unemployment Insurance (No. 2) Act (Northern Ireland) 1924	14 & 15 Geo. 5. c. 25 (N.I.)	7 November 1924
An Act to amend the Unemployment Insurance Acts (Northern Ireland), 1920 to 1924.
Appropriation (No. 2) Act (Northern Ireland) 1924	14 & 15 Geo. 5. c. 26 (N.I.)	7 November 1924
An Act to apply a Sum out of the Consolidated Fund of Northern Ireland to the service of the year ending on the thirty-first day of March, nineteen hundred and twenty-five, and to appropriate the further Supplies granted in this Session of Parliament.
Illegitimate Children (Affiliation Orders) Act (Northern Ireland) 1924 (repealed)	14 & 15 Geo. 5. c. 27 (N.I.)	7 November 1924
An Act to make better provision in Northern Ireland with regard to children of unmarried parents; and for other purposes connected therewith. (Repealed by Children (Northern Ireland) Order 1995 (SI 1995/755))
Housing Acts Amendment Act (Northern Ireland) 1924 (repealed)	14 & 15 Geo. 5. c. 28 (N.I.)	7 November 1924
An Act to amend section eleven of the Housing (Ireland) Act, 1919, (Note: Housing (Ireland) Act 1919 (9 & 10 Geo. 5. c. 45)) and section one of the Housing Act (Northern Ireland), 1923. (Note: Housing Act (Northern Ireland) 1923 (13 & 14 Geo. 5. c. 30 (N.I.))) (Repealed by Housing (Northern Ireland) Order 1976 (SI 1976/1780))
Valuation Acts Amendment Act (Northern Ireland) 1924	14 & 15 Geo. 5. c. 29 (N.I.)	7 November 1924
An Act to prescribe the method of ascertaining the annual rateable value of certain houses and buildings in Northern Ireland for the purposes of the Irish Valuation Acts.

==== Local acts ====
Short title, or popular name	Citation	Royal assent
Long title
Ministry of Home Affairs Provisional Order Confirmation (Bangor Water) Act (Northern Ireland) 1924	14 & 15 Geo. 5. c. i (N.I.)	29 May 1924
An Act to confirm a Provisional Order of the Ministry of Home Affairs for Northern Ireland relating to the Urban District of Bangor.
	Bangor Water Order 1924 Provisional Order to alter and amend the Bangor (County Down) Water and Improvement Act, 1905. (Note: Bangor (County Down) Water and Improvement Act 1905 (5 Edw. 7. c. cxcvi))	
Ministry of Home Affairs Provisional Order Confirmation (Castlerock Waterworks) Act (Northern Ireland) 1924	14 & 15 Geo. 5. c. ii (N.I.)	29 May 1924
An Act to confirm a Provisional Order of the Ministry of Home Affairs for Northern Ireland relating to the Rural District of Coleraine.
	Castlerock Waterworks Order 1924 Provisional Order to enable the Council of the Rural District of Colerain to put in force the compulsory clauses of the Lands Clauses Acts.	
Belfast Water Act (Northern Ireland) 1924	14 & 15 Geo. 5. c. iii (N.I.)	29 May 1924
An Act to confer further Powers on the Belfast City and District Water Commissioners.
Belfast Corporation Act (Northern Ireland) 1924	14 & 15 Geo. 5. c. iv (N.I.)	29 May 1924
An Act to empower the Lord Mayor, Aldermen and Citizens of the City of Belfast to construct a Lock and Weir on the River Lagan; to construct a Wharf Embankment and Roadways; to make Street Improvements; to construct and work an Additional Tramway; to run Omnibuses within the City; to acquire Lands; to establish Superannuation and Pensions Funds; and to confer various further powers upon the Corporation in relation to the Good Government of the City; and for other purposes.
Londonderry Corporation Act (Northern Ireland) 1924	14 & 15 Geo. 5. c. v (N.I.)	29 May 1924
An Act to provide for the Transfer to the Mayor Aldermen and Burgesses of the City of Londonderry of the Undertaking of the Londonderry Bridge Commissioners and to authorise the said Mayor Aldermen and Burgesses to maintain work and regulate the same; to widen raise and reconstruct the Londonderry Bridge (Note: Carlisle Bridge, Londonderry.) and the approaches thereto; to construct works for the purposes of their water undertaking and to make a street improvement; to confer further powers upon the said Mayor Aldermen and Burgesses with respect to their Water Electricity Markets and Omnibus Undertakings; to make further provision for the improvement and good government of the City; and for other purposes.

==== Sources ====
- The Public General Statutes passed by the Parliament of Northern Ireland in the Fourteenth and Fifteenth Years of the Reign of His Majesty King George the Fifth. 1924. Belfast: Council of Law Reporting. 1925 – via Google Books.

=== 1925 ===
==== Public acts ====
===== First session =====
Short title, or popular name	Citation	Royal assent
Long title
Education Act (Northern Ireland) 1925 (repealed)	15 Geo. 5. c. 1 (N.I.)	13 March 1925
An Act to amend the Education Act (Northern Ireland), 1923, (Note: Education Act (Northern Ireland) 1923 (13 & 14 Geo. 5. c. 21 (N.I.))) for the purpose of removing doubts as to the provisions of the said Act with respect to voluntary religious instruction in provided and transferred schools. (Repealed by Education Act (Northern Ireland) 1947 (c. 3 (N.I.))
Loans Guarantee Act (Northern Ireland) 1925	15 Geo. 5. c. 2 (N.I.)	13 March 1925
An Act to amend the Loans Guarantee Acts (Northern Ireland), 1922 to 1924, by increasing the amount of loans which may be guaranteed under those Acts, and extending the period for giving guarantees thereunder.
Unemployment Fund Act (Northern Ireland) 1925	15 Geo. 5. c. 3 (N.I.)	13 March 1925
An Act to enable the Ministry of Finance to make further advances for discharging the liabilities of the Northern Irish Unemployment Fund.
Appropriation Act (Northern Ireland) 1925	15 Geo. 5. c. 4 (N.I.)	13 March 1925
An Act to apply certain Sums out of the Consolidated Fund of Northern Ireland to the service of the year ended on the thirty-first day of March, nineteen hundred and twenty-four, and of the years ending on the thirty-first day of March, nineteen hundred and twenty-five, and the thirty-first day of March, nineteen hundred and twenty-six, and to appropriate the supplies granted in this Session of Parliament.

===== Second session =====
Short title, or popular name	Citation	Royal assent
Long title
Public Health (Milk Regulations) Act (Northern Ireland) 1925	15 & 16 Geo. 5. c. 1 (N.I.)	21 May 1925
An Act to enable regulations to be made for the prevention of danger arising to public health in Northern Ireland from the preparation, storage and distribution of milk.
Civil Pensions Act (Northern Ireland) 1925	15 & 16 Geo. 5. c. 2 (N.I.)	20 May 1925
An Act to enable pensions and gratuities to be granted for meritorious public services.
Administrative Provisions Act (Northern Ireland) 1925	15 & 16 Geo. 5. c. 3 (N.I.)	21 May 1925
An Act to make further provision with respect to the administration of certain public services in Northern Ireland, and for purposes connected therewith.
Charitable Loan Societies Act (Northern Ireland) 1925	15 & 16 Geo. 5. c. 4 (N.I.)	9 June 1925
An Act to provide for the better administration of the Charitable Loan Societies (Ireland) Acts, 1843 to 1906, in Northern Ireland, and to amend the provisions of the said Acts relating to the disposition of surplus funds and property.
County Officers and Courts Act (Northern Ireland) 1925	15 & 16 Geo. 5. c. 5 (N.I.)	9 June 1925
An Act to establish a County Court Service in Northern Ireland, and to amend the Law relating to certain County Officers and to Courts of Quarter Sessions and Civil Bill Courts, and for purposes connected therewith.
Rules Publication Act (Northern Ireland) 1925 (repealed)	15 & 16 Geo. 5. c. 6 (N.I.)	9 June 1925
An Act to amend, in its application to Northern Ireland, the Law relating to the Publication of Statutory Rules and to the laying of Statutory Rules before Parliament. (Repealed by Statutory Rules Act (Northern Ireland) 1958 (c. 18 (N.I.)))
Canals (Continuance of Charging Powers) Act (Northern Ireland) 1925	15 & 16 Geo. 5. c. 7 (N.I.)	9 June 1925
An Act to provide for the continuance of charging powers in respect of canal or inland navigation undertakings in Northern Ireland of which possession was retained or taken by the Minister of Transport under the Ministry of Transport Act, 1919. (Note: Ministry of Transport Act 1919 (9 & 10 Geo. 5. c. 50))
Pharmacy and Poisons Act (Northern Ireland) 1925	15 & 16 Geo. 5. c. 8 (N.I.)	9 June 1925
An Act to establish a Pharmaceutical Society of Northern Ireland; to regulate the qualifications and provide for the annual licensing of Pharmaceutical Chemists, Chemists and Druggists and Druggists in Northern Ireland; to amend and extend the law with respect to the sale of poisons; and for other purposes incidental thereto.
Finance (Estate Duty) Act (Northern Ireland) 1925	15 & 16 Geo. 5. c. 9 (N.I.)	9 June 1925
An Act to alter the rates of Estate Duty payable in Northern Ireland.
Appropriation Act (Northern Ireland) 1925 (Session 2)	15 & 16 Geo. 5. c. c. 10 (N.I.)	9 June 1925
An Act to apply a Sum out of the Consolidated Fund of Northern Ireland to the service of the year ending on the thirty-first day of March, nineteen hundred and twenty-six, and to appropriate the Supplies granted in this Session of Parliament.
Rent and Mortgage Interest Restrictions Act (Northern Ireland) 1925	15 & 16 Geo. 5. c. 12 (N.I.)	9 June 1925
An Act to empower the Governor of Northern Ireland to make temporary provision by Order in Council for the amendment of the Unemployment Insurance Acts (Northern Ireland), 1920 to 1924.
Unemployment Insurance (Temporary Provisions) Act (Northern Ireland) 1925 (repealed)	15 & 16 Geo. 5. c. 11 (N.I.)	9 June 1925
An Act to amend and prolong the duration of the Increase of Rent and Mortgage Interest (Restrictions) Act, 1920, (Note: Increase of Rent and Mortgage Interest (Restrictions) Act 1920 (10 & 11 Geo. 5. c. 17)) in its application to Northern Ireland, and for purposes in connection therewith. (Repealed by Unemployment Insurance Act (Northern Ireland) 1925 (15 & 16 Geo. 5. c. 22 (N.I.)))
Housing Act (Northern Ireland) 1925	15 & 16 Geo. 5. c. 13 (N.I.)	9 June 1925
An Act to amend the Housing Act (Northern Ireland), 1923, (Note: Housing Act (Northern Ireland) 1923 (13 & 14 Geo. 5. c. 30 (N.I.))) and the Housing Acts Amendment Act (Northern Ireland), 1924. (Note: Housing Acts Amendment Act (Northern Ireland) 1924 (14 & 15 Geo. 5. c. 28 (N.I.)))
Local Authorities (University Grants) Act (Northern Ireland) 1925	15 & 16 Geo. 5. c. 14 (N.I.)	9 June 1925
An Act to enable the councils of counties and county boroughs to make grants to the Queen's University of Belfast.
Unemployment Fund Act (Northern Ireland) 1925 (Session 2)	15 & 16 Geo. 5. c. 15 (N.I.)	7 September 1925
An Act to enable the Ministry of Finance to make further advances for discharging the liabilities of the Northern Irish Unemployment Fund.
Dangerous Drugs Act (Northern Ireland) 1925	15 & 16 Geo. 5. c. 16 (N.I.)	7 September 1925
An Act to amend the Dangerous Drugs Act, 1920, (Note: Dangerous Drugs Act 1920 (10 & 11 Geo. 5. c. 46)) and the Dangerous Drugs and Poisons (Amendment) Act (Northern Ireland), 1924, (Note: Dangerous Drugs and Poisons (Amendment) Act (Northern Ireland) 1924 (14 & 15 Geo. 5. c. 4 (N.I.))) so far as is necessary to assimilate the law in Northern Ireland to the law in force in Great Britain, in relation to certain dangerous drugs; and for purposes connected therewith.
Government Loans and Exchequer Provisions Act (Northern Ireland) 1925	15 & 16 Geo. 5. c. 17 (N.I.)	20 October 1925
An Act to Provide for the establishment of a Government Loans Fund and the creation of Ulster Loans stock, and for purposes connected therewith; and to amend certain enactments relating to the Exchequer and Finance.
Seed Potatoes Supply Act (Northern Ireland) 1925	15 & 16 Geo. 5. c. 18 (N.I.)	10 November 1925
An Act to make provision with respect to Sales and Loans made for the purpose of the supply of Seed Potatoes to certain occupiers and cultivators of land in Northern Ireland.
Expiring Laws Continuance Act (Northern Ireland) 1925	15 & 16 Geo. 5. c. 19 (N.I.)	10 November 1925
An Act to continue certain Expiring Laws as respects Northern Ireland.
Old Age Pensions Act (Northern Ireland) 1925	15 & 16 Geo. 5. c. 20 (N.I.)	10 November 1925
An Act to amend paragraph 3 of section two and sub-section (1) of section nine of the Old Age Pensions Act, 1908, (Note: Old Age Pensions Act 1908 (8 Edw. 7. c. 40)) in its application to Northern Ireland.
Census Act (Northern Ireland) 1925	15 & 16 Geo. 5. c. 21 (N.I.)	10 November 1925
An Act for taking the Census for Northern Ireland in the year nineteen hundred and twenty-six, and for otherwise collecting statistical information.
Unemployment Insurance Act (Northern Ireland) 1925	15 & 16 Geo. 5. c. 22 (N.I.)	10 November 1925
An Act to amend sub-section (2) of section three of the Unemployment Insurance (No. 2) Act (Northern Ireland), 1924, (Note: Unemployment Insurance (No. 2) Act (Northern Ireland) 1924 (14 & 15 Geo. 5. c. 25 (N.I.))) to amend the law with respect to the period on the expiration of which benefit under the Acts relating to unemployment insurance becomes payable and with respect to the rates of contribution under the said Acts, and to continue the saving contained in sub-section (1) of section twelve of the Unemployment Insurance Act (Northern Ireland), 1923. (Note: Unemployment Insurance Act (Northern Ireland) 1923 (13 & 14 Geo. 5. c. 11 (N.I.)))
Widows' Orphans' and Old Age Contributory Pensions Act (Northern Ireland) 1925	15 & 16 Geo. 5. c. 23 (N.I.)	6 November 1925
An Act to make provision for pensions for widows, orphans, and persons between the ages of sixty five and seventy, and for the payment of contributions in respect thereof; and to amend the enactments relating to health and unemployment insurance and old age pensions.
Drainage Act (Northern Ireland) 1925 (repealed)	15 & 16 Geo. 5. c. 24 (N.I.)	10 November 1925
An Act to empower county councils to carry out schemes for the drainage, and improvement by drainage, of lands; to provide for the transfer to county councils of the functions of certain existing drainage authorities; to enable further powers to be granted to other existing drainage authorities; and to establish a Drainage Advisory Committee; and for other purposes connected therewith. (Repealed by Drainage (Northern Ireland) Order 1973 (SI 1973/69)
Appropriation (No. 2) Act (Northern Ireland) 1925 (Session 2)	15 & 16 Geo. 5. c. 25 (N.I.)	22 December 1925
An Act to apply a Sum out of the Consolidated Fund of Northern Ireland to the service of the year ending on the thirty-first day of March, nineteen hundred and twenty-six, and to appropriate the further Supplies granted in this Session of Parliament.
Unemployment Fund (No. 2) Act (Northern Ireland) 1925 (Session 2)	15 & 16 Geo. 5. c. 26 (N.I.)	22 December 1925
An Act to enable the Ministry of Finance to make further advances for discharging the liabilities of the Northern Irish Unemployment Fund.
Education (Administrative Provisions) Act (Northern Ireland) 1925 (repealed)	15 & 16 Geo. 5. c. 27 (N.I.)	22 December 1925
An Act to extend the powers of councils of counties and county boroughs and urban district councils to borrow money for the purposes of the Education Act (Northern Ireland), 1923. (Note: Education Act (Northern Ireland) 1923 (13 & 14 Geo. 5. c. 21 (N.I.))) (Repealed by Education Act (Northern Ireland) 1947 (c. 3 (N.I.))
Superannuation Act (Northern Ireland) 1925	15 & 16 Geo. 5. c. 28 (N.I.)	22 December 1925
An Act to amend the Superannuation Acts (Northern Ireland), 1921 to 1923.
Intoxicating Liquor (Finance) Act (Northern Ireland) 1925	15 & 16 Geo. 5. c. 29 (N.I.)	22 December 1925
An Act to increase the maximum rates at which charges are leviable under section three of the Intoxicating Liquor Act (Northern Ireland), 1923, (Note: Intoxicating Liquor Act (Northern Ireland) 1923 (13 & 14 Geo. 5. c. 12 (N.I.))) and to make further provision with respect to the repayment of advances made to the Claims Fund established under the said section, and with respect to the payment of the said charges.
Finance Act (Northern Ireland) 1925	15 & 16 Geo. 5. c. 30 (NI)	22 December 1925
An Act to alter certain Duties of Excise and to amend the law relating to certain Duties of Inland Revenue, and for purposes connected therewith.

==== Local acts ====
Short title, or popular name	Citation	Royal assent
Long title
Ministry of Home Affairs Provisional Order Confirmation (Londonderry County Borough) Act (Northern Ireland) 1925	15 & 16 Geo. 5. c. i (N.I.)	9 June 1925
An Act to confirm a Provisional Order of the Ministry of Home Affairs for Northern Ireland relating to the County Borough of Londonderry.
	Londonderry County Borough Order 1925 Provisional Order to enable the Council of the County Borough of Londonderry to put in force the Compulsory Clauses of the Lands Clauses Acts.	
London Midland and Scottish Railway (Ballycastle Railway Vesting) Act (Northern Ireland) 1925	15 & 16 Geo. 5. c. ii (N.I.)	9 June 1925
An Act to provide for the Vesting of the Undertaking of the Ballycastle Railway Company in the London Midland and Scottish Railway Company and for other purposes.
Belfast Corporation Act (Northern Ireland) 1925	15 & 16 Geo. 5. c. iii (N.I.)	9 June 1925
An Act to consolidate the local rates leviable in the City of Belfast; to authorise the execution of street improvements and the acquisition of lands; and for other purposes.

==== Private acts ====
Short title, or popular name	Citation	Royal assent
Long title
Wright's Divorce Act (Northern Ireland) 1925	15 & 16 Geo. 5. c. 1 Pr. (N.I.)	10 November 1925

==== Sources ====
- The Public General Acts of 1925 passed in the Fifteenth and Sixteenth Years of the Reign of His Majesty King George the Fifth, being the Fifth Session of the First and the First Session of the Second Parliament of Northern Ireland. Belfast: William Richard Codling – via Google Books.

=== 1926 ===
==== Public acts ====
Short title, or popular name	Citation	Royal assent
Long title
Unemployment Insurance (Agreement) Act (Northern Ireland) 1926	16 Geo. 5. c. 1 (N.I.)	23 March 1926
An Act to confirm and give effect to an agreement made between the Treasury of the United Kingdom and the Ministry of Finance for Northern Ireland with a view to assimilating the burdens on the Exchequers of the United Kingdom and Northern Ireland with respect to unemployment insurance, and for purposes connected therewith.
Housing Act (Northern Ireland) 1926	16 Geo. 5. c. 2 (N.I.)	30 March 1926
An Act to prolong the time for the operation of section one of the Housing Act (Northern Ireland), 1923, (Note: Housing Act (Northern Ireland) 1923 (13 & 14 Geo. 5. c. 30 (N.I.)) as amended by subsequent enactments.
Loans Guarantee Act (Northern Ireland) 1926	16 Geo. 5. c. 3 (N.I.)	30 March 1926
An Act to amend the Loans Guarantee Acts (Northern Ireland), 1922 to 1925, by increasing the amount of loans which may be guaranteed under the said Acts and extending the period for giving guarantees thereunder, and to authorise the Ministry of Finance to contribute towards the interest on certain loans guaranteed under the said Acts.
Administrative Provisions Act (Northern Ireland) 1926	16 Geo. 5. c. 4 (N.I.)	30 March 1926
An Act to make provision with respect to the administration of the public services transferred to the Government of Northern Ireland by virtue of the Ireland (Confirmation of Agreement) Act, 1925, (Note: Ireland (Confirmation of Agreement) Act 1925 (15 & 16 Geo. 5. c. 77)) and for purposes connected therewith.
Pharmacy (Temporary Provisions) Act (Northern Ireland) 1926	16 Geo. 5. c. 5 (N.I.)	30 March 1926
An Act to amend section seven and sub-section (2) of section nineteen of the Pharmacy and Poisons Act (Northern Ireland), 1925. (Note: Pharmacy and Poisons Act (Northern Ireland) 1925 (15 & 16 Geo. 5. c. 8 (N.I.)))
Municipal Corporations Act (Northern Ireland) 1926	16 Geo. 5. c. 6 (N.I.)	30 March 1926
An Act to amend section fourteen of the Municipal Corporations (Ireland) Act, 1840, (Note: Municipal Corporations (Ireland) Act 1840 (3 & 4 Vict. c. 108)) and for purposes connected therewith.
Consolidated Fund Act (Northern Ireland) 1926	16 Geo. 5. c. 7 (N.I.)	30 March 1926
An Act to apply certain Sums out of the Consolidated Fund of Northern Ireland to the service of the years ending on the thirty-first day of March, nineteen hundred and twenty-six, and the thirty-first day of March, nineteen hundred and twenty-seven.
Emergency Powers Act (Northern Ireland) 1926 (repealed)	16 & 17 Geo. 5. c. 8 (N.I.)	6 May 1926
An Act to make provision for the protection of the community in Northern Ireland in cases of emergency. (Repealed by Civil Contingencies Act 2004 (c. 36))
Mines (Working Facilities, Support, etc.) Act (Northern Ireland) 1926	16 & 17 Geo. 5. c. 9 (N.I.)	1 June 1926
An Act to make provision for facilitating the working of Minerals, and for imposing restrictions on the working of Minerals required for the support of buildings and works; to amend the Law with respect to Mines; and for purposes connected therewith.
Pensions (Increase) Act (Northern Ireland) 1926	16 & 17 Geo. 5. c. 10 (N.I.)	1 June 1926
An Act to confirm and give effect to an Agreement for the deduction from the Northern Ireland residuary share of reserved taxes of the amount of certain increases made under an Act of the Parliament of the United Kingdom in respect of pensions deductible from the said share; to raise the percentages by which certain other pensions may be increased under the Pensions (Increase) Act, 1920; (Note: Pensions (Increase) Act 1920 (10 & 11 Geo. 5. c. 36)) to permit the payment of increased pensions under the said Pensions (Increase) Act to pensioners residing outside the British Islands; and for purposes connected therewith.
Economy (Exchequer Belief) Act (Northern Ireland) 1926	16 & 17 Geo. 5. c. 11 (N.I.)	1 June 1926
An Act to make provision for reducing in respect of certain services the charges on public funds and for increasing, by means of the payment into the Exchequer of Northern Ireland of certain sums and otherwise, the funds available for meeting such charges, and to amend accordingly the law relating to national health insurance, unemployment insurance, petty sessions funds and local government, and for purposes related or incidental to the matters aforesaid.
Ancient Monuments Act (Northern Ireland) 1926	16 & 17 Geo. 5. c. 12 (N.I.)	1 June 1926
An Act to amend and extend the law relating to ancient monuments, and to make provision for the preservation of objects of archaeological interest; and for other purposes in connection therewith.
Queen's University of Belfast Act (Northern Ireland) 1926	16 & 17 Geo. 5. c. 13 (N.I.)	1 June 1926
An Act to alter the constitution of the Senate of the Queen's University of Belfast.
Appropriation Act (Northern Ireland) 1926	16 & 17 Geo. 5. c. 14 (N.I.)	1 June 1926
An Act to apply a Sum out of the Consolidated Fund of Northern Ireland to the service of the year ending on the thirty-first day of March, nineteen hundred and twenty-seven, and to appropriate the Supplies granted in this Session of Parliament.
Jury Laws Amendment Act (Northern Ireland) 1926	16 & 17 Geo. 5. c. 15 (N.I.)	1 June 1926
An Act to amend the Laws relating to Juries in Northern Ireland.
Teachers' Superannuation Act (Northern Ireland) 1926	16 & 17 Geo. 5. c. 16 (N.I.)	1 June 1926
An Act to enable the Pension Fund (Northern Ireland) established for the purposes of the National School Teachers (Ireland) Act, 1879, (Note: National School Teachers (Ireland) Act 1879 (42 & 43 Vict. c. 74)) and certain other funds to be amalgamated and applied for the purposes of superannuation schemes for teachers and to provide for the inclusion of further provisions in such schemes therewith.
Firearms (Amendment) Act (Northern Ireland) 1926	16 & 17 Geo. 5. c. 17 (N.I.)	1 June 1926
An Act to amend the Firearms Act, 1920, (Note: Firearms Act 1920 (10 & 11 Geo. 5. c. 43)) in its application to Northern Ireland.
Unemployment Insurance Act (Northern Ireland) 1926	16 & 17 Geo. 5. c. 18 (N.I.)	1 June 1926
An Act to extend the periods of operation of section one and of sub-section (2) of section three of the Unemployment Insurance (No. 2) Act (Northern Ireland), 1924, (Note: Unemployment Insurance (No. 2) Act (Northern Ireland) 1924 (14 & 15 Geo. 5. c. 25 (N.I.))) and of sub-section (1) of section four of the Unemployment Insurance Act (Northern Ireland), 1925. (Note: Unemployment Insurance Act (Northern Ireland) 1925 (15 & 16 Geo. 5. c. 22 (N.I.)))
Loans Guarantee (No. 2) Act (Northern Ireland) 1926	16 & 17 Geo. 5. c. 19 (N.I.)	30 November 1926
An Act to amend the Loans Guarantee Acts (Northern Ireland), 1922 to 1926, by increasing the amount of loans which may be guaranteed under the said Acts and extending the period for giving guarantees thereunder.
Expiring Laws Continuance Act (Northern Ireland) 1926	16 & 17 Geo. 5. c. 20 (N.I.)	30 November 1926
An Act to continue certain Expiring Laws as respects Northern Ireland.
Industrial Assurance (Juvenile Societies) Act (Northern Ireland) 1926	16 & 17 Geo. 5. c. 21 (N.I.)	30 November 1926
An Act to amend section eleven of the Industrial Assurance Act (Northern Ireland), 1924, (Note: Industrial Assurance Act (Northern Ireland) 1924 (14 & 15 Geo. 5. c. 21 (N.I.))) with respect to the exemption from that Act of juvenile societies.
Malone Training School Act (Northern Ireland) 1926	16 & 17 Geo. 5. c. 22 (N.I.)	30 November 1926
An Act to confirm and give effect to an agreement relating to the transfer of the Malone Training School to the Ministry of Home Affairs for the purposes of a Reformatory School and a Borstal Institution, and for purposes connected therewith.
Housing (No. 2) Act (Northern Ireland) 1926	16 & 17 Geo. 5. c. 23 (N.I.)	30 November 1926
An Act to prolong further the time for the operation of section one of the Housing Act (Northern Ireland), 1923, as amended by subsequent enactments.
Finance (Stamp Duty) Act (Northern Ireland) 1926	16 & 17 Geo. 5. c. 24 (N.I.)	30 November 1926
An Act to amend the law relating to Stamp Duty in certain cases, and to re-enact, with amendments, the enactments charging Stamp Duty upon certain Instruments and provide for the application of the proceeds thereof.
Appropriation (No. 2) Act (Northern Ireland) 1926	16 & 17 Geo. 5. c. 25 (N.I.)	30 November 1926
An Act to apply a Sum out of the Consolidated Fund of Northern Ireland to the service of the year ending on the thirty-first day of March, nineteen hundred and twenty-seven, and to appropriate the further Supplies granted in this Session of Parliament.
Local Government (War Service Payments) Act (Northern Ireland) 1926	16 & 17 Geo. 5. c. 26 (N.I.)	30 November 1926
An Act to remove doubts as to the powers of local authorities to make certain payments for the purposes of section one of the Local Government (Emergency Provisions) Act, 1916. (Note: Local Government (Emergency Provisions) Act 1916 (6 & 7 Geo. 5. c. 12))
Exchequer and Financial Provisions Act (Northern Ireland) 1926	16 & 17 Geo. 5. c. 27 (N.I.)	30 November 1926
An Act to amend certain enactments relating to Government Loans, Consolidated Fund charges and Exchequer borrowing, the audit of accounts, and the salary and superannuation of the Comptroller and Auditor-General for Northern Ireland.
Marketing of Eggs Act (Northern Ireland) 1926	16 & 17 Geo. 5. c. 28 (N.I.)	30 November 1926
An Act to provide for the better marketing of eggs, and for that purpose to amend and extend certain provisions of the Marketing of Eggs Act (Northern Ireland), 1924. (Note: Marketing of Eggs Act (Northern Ireland) 1924 (14 & 15 Geo. 5. c. 15 (N.I.)))
Protection of Animals (Miscellaneous Provisions) Act (Northern Ireland) 1926	16 & 17 Geo. 5. c. 29 (N.I.)	30 November 1926
An Act to regulate the exhibition and training of performing animals; to provide for the further protection of birds; and to amend the Protection of Animals Act, 1911. (Note: Protection of Animals Act 1911 (1 & 2 Geo. 5. c. 27))
Horse Breeding Act (Northern Ireland) 1926	16 & 17 Geo. 5. c. 30 (N.I.)	30 November 1926
An Act to make further provision for the licensing of stallions in Northern Ireland, and for purposes connected therewith.
Motor Vehicles (Traffic and Regulation) Act (Northern Ireland) 1926	16 & 17 Geo. 5. c. 31 (N.I.)	30 November 1926
An Act to make further provision with respect to the use of mechanically propelled vehicles on public highways, and with respect to the licensing and regulation of certain classes of such vehicles and their drivers and conductors, and for purposes related or incidental to the matters aforesaid.

==== Private acts ====
Short title, or popular name	Citation	Royal assent
Long title
McCaldin's Divorce Act (Northern Ireland) 1926	16 & 17 Geo. 5. c. 1 Pr. (N.I.)	1 June 1926
An Act to dissolve the marriage of William Arthur McCaldin, of Victoria House, Banbridge, in the County of Down, with Elizabeth McCaldin, his wife, and to enable him to marry again, and for other purposes.

==== Sources ====
- The Public General Statutes passed by the Parliament of Northern Ireland in the Sixteenth and Seventeenth Year of the Reign of His Majesty King George the Fifth. 1926. Vol. VI. Belfast: Council of Law Reporting. 1927 – via Google Books.

=== 1927 ===
==== Public acts ====
Short title, or popular name	Citation	Royal assent
Long title
Agricultural Research Station Act (Northern Ireland) 1927 (repealed)	17 Geo. 5. c. 1 (N.I.)	31 March 1927
An Act to confirm and give effect to an agreement relating to the establishment of an Agricultural Research Station for Northern Ireland, and to incorporate certain Trustees for the control and management of the said Station, and for purposes connected therewith. (Repealed by Agriculture (Northern Ireland) Order 2004 (SI 2004/3327))
Consolidated Fund Act (Northern Ireland) 1927	17 Geo. 5. c. 2 (N.I.)	31 March 1927
An Act to apply certain Sums out of the Consolidated Fund of Northern Ireland to the service of the years ending on the thirty-first day of March, nineteen hundred and twenty-seven, and the thirty-first day of March, nineteen hundred and twenty-eight.
Dogs Act (Northern Ireland) 1927	17 Geo. 5. c. 3 (N.I.)	26 April 1927
An Act to amend the law relating to injury to certain classes of live stock by dogs.
Labourers Cottages (Loans) Act (Northern Ireland) 1927	17 Geo. 5. c. 4 (N.I.)	26 April 1927
An Act to amend the Labourers Act (Northern Ireland), 1923, (Note: Labourers Act (Northern Ireland) 1923 (13 & 14 Geo. 5. c. 23 (N.I.))) in its application to certain loans and advances under the Labourers Acts (Northern Ireland), 1883 to 1923.
Salaries of Ministerial Offices Act (Northern Ireland) 1927	17 Geo. 5. c. 5 (N.I.)	26 April 1927
An Act to alter the allocation of certain salaries which are payable under the Salaries of Ministerial Offices Act, 1921 [N.I.] (Note: Salaries of Ministerial Offices Act 1921 (N.I.) (12 Geo. 5. c. 9 (N.I.)))
Horticultural Produce (Sales on Commission) Act (Northern Ireland) 1927	17 & 18 Geo. 5. c. 6 (N.I.)	31 May 1927
An Act to regulate the sale on commission of horticultural produce.
Lead Paint (Protection against Poisoning) Act (Northern Ireland) 1927	17 & 18 Geo. 5. c. 7 (N.I.)	31 May 1927
An Act to make better provision for the protection against lead poisoning of persons employed in painting buildings.
Loans Guarantee Act (Northern Ireland) 1927	17 & 18 Geo. 5. c. 8 (N.I)	31 May 1927
An Act to amend the Loans Guarantee Acts (Northern Ireland), 1922 to 1926, by increasing the amount of loans which may be guaranteed under the said Acts.
Railways (Road Vehicles) Act (Northern Ireland) 1927	17 & 18 Geo. 5. c. 9 (N.I.)	31 May 1927
An Act to empower railway companies to provide and run road vehicles.
Exchequer and Financial Provisions Act (Northern Ireland) 1927	17 & 18 Geo. 5. c. 10 (N.I.)	31 May 1927
An Act to make further provision for the bringing into account of the Northern Ireland residuary share of reserved taxes, and for payments to the reserve fund, and to charge on the Consolidated Fund certain sums for the purposes of agriculture and housing.
Finance Act (Northern Ireland) 1927	17 & 18 Geo. 5. c. 11 (N.I.)	31 May 1927
An Act to alter the Rate of Entertainments Duty, to amend the Law relating to certain Duties of Inland Revenue (including Excise), and to make provision for Relief in respect of Double Taxation as between Northern Ireland and Great Britain and as between Northern Ireland and the Irish Free State, and for purposes connected therewith.
Appropriation Act (Northern Ireland) 1927	17 & 18 Geo. 5. c. 12 (N.I.)	31 May 1927
An Act to apply a Sum out of the Consolidated Fund of Northern Ireland to the service of the year ending on the thirty-first day of March, nineteen hundred and twenty-eight, and to appropriate the Supplies granted in this Session of Parliament.
Workmen's Compensation (Miscellaneous Amendments) Act (Northern Ireland) 1927	17 & 18 Geo. 5. c. 13 (N.I.)	31 May 1927
An Act to amend the provisions of the Workmen's Compensation Acts (Northern Ireland), 1906 to 1923; and to give effect in Northern Ireland to certain enactments of the Workmen's Compensation Act, 1925. (Note: Workmen's Compensation Act 1925 (15 & 16 Geo. 5. c. 84))
Expiring Laws Continuance Act (Northern Ireland) 1927	17 & 18 Geo. 5. c. 14 (N.I.)	21 December 1927
An Act to continue certain Expiring Laws as respects Northern Ireland.
Housing Act (Northern Ireland) 1927 (repealed)	17 & 18 Geo. 5. c. 15 (N.I.)	21 December 1927
An Act to amend section one of the Housing Act (Northern Ireland), 1923, (Note: Housing Act (Northern Ireland) 1923 (13 & 14 Geo. 5. c. 30 (N.I.))) as amended by subsequent enactments, and to extend the powers of local authorities in connection with the sale of houses. (Repealed by Housing (Northern Ireland) Order 1976 (SI 1976/1780))
Workmen's Compensation Act (Northern Ireland) 1927	17 & 18 Geo. 5. c. 16 (N.I.)	21 December 1927
An Act to consolidate, as respects Northern Ireland, the law relating to compensation to workmen for injuries suffered in the course of their employment.
Sale of Milk Act (Northern Ireland) 1927	17 & 18 Geo. 5. c. 17 (N.I.)	21 December 1927
An Act to provide for the granting of licences for the sale of milk under special designations.
Rent and Mortgage Interest Restrictions (Amendment) Act (Northern Ireland) 1927	17 & 18 Geo. 5. c. 18 (N.I.)	21 December 1927
An Act to amend the provisions of the Rent and Mortgage Interest (Restrictions) Acts (Northern Ireland), 1920 to 1925, with respect to houses let with furniture and the obtaining of possession of houses by misrepresentation.
Quarries Act (Northern Ireland) 1927	17 & 18 Geo. 5. c. 19 (N.I.)	21 December 1927
An Act to consolidate with amendments the enactments relating to quarries, and for purposes connected therewith.
Trade Disputes and Trade Unions Act (Northern Ireland) 1927	17 & 18 Geo. 5. c. 20 (N.I.)	21 December 1927
An Act to declare and amend the law relating to trade disputes and trade unions, to regulate the position of civil servants and persons employed by public authorities in respect of membership of trade unions and similar organisations, to extend section five of the Conspiracy, and Protection of Property Act, 1875, (Note: Conspiracy, and Protection of Property Act 1875 (38 & 39 Vict. c. 86)) and for other purposes connected with the purposes aforesaid.
Intoxicating Liquor and Licensing Act (Northern Ireland) 1927	17 & 18 Geo. 5. c. 21 (N.I.)	21 December 1927
An Act to amend the law relating to the sale and supply of intoxicating liquor (including methylated spirits and methylated ether), the registration of clubs, and the licensing of theatres and music halls; and for purposes connected therewith.
Old Age Pensions (Administration) Act (Northern Ireland) 1927	17 & 18 Geo. 5. c. 22 (N.I.)	21 December 1927
An Act to provide for the administration by the Ministry of Labour of the public service in connection with non-contributory old age pensions, and to amend the law with respect to the determination of claims for, and questions relating to, such pensions.
Lisburn Electric Supply Company (Agreement) Act (Northern Ireland) 1927	17 & 18 Geo. 5. c. 23 (N.I.)	21 December 1927
An Act to confirm and give effect to an agreement made between the Ministry of Commerce and the Lisburn Electric Supply Company, Limited, with respect to the transmission line to be constructed by the said Company for carrying electrical energy from Belfast to Lisburn.

==== Local acts ====
Short title, or popular name	Citation	Royal assent
Long title
Portadown Urban District Council Act (Northern Ireland) 1927 (repealed)	17 & 18 Geo. 5. c. i (N.I.)	31 May 1927
An Act to simplify the Collection and Recovery of Rates in the Town of Portadown, and for other purposes. (Repealed by Rates (Northern Ireland) Order 1972 (SI 1972/1633)
Newry Urban District Council Act (Northern Ireland) 1927	17 & 18 Geo. 5. c. ii (N.I.)	31 May 1927
An Act to simplify the Collection and Recovery of Rates in the Urban District of Newry, and to authorize the closing of a street (Note: Part of Lower Water Street, Newry) in the said Urban District, and for other purposes.
Carrickfergus Harbour Act (Northern Ireland) 1927	17 & 18 Geo. 5. c. iii (N.I.)	31 May 1927
An Act to transfer from the Carrickfergus Harbour Commissioners to the Urban District Council of Carrickfergus the Harbour of Carrickfergus, and all other property of the Carrickfergus Harbour Commissioners, and to confer power on the Urban District Council of Carrickfergus to execute certain works and to make certain railways at the said Harbour, and to work, use, maintain, and repair the said harbour works and railways, and to levy tolls for the use thereof, and to borrow ten thousand pounds and to secure repayment thereof by mortgage or charge and for other purposes.
River Bann Navigation Act (Northern Ireland) 1927	17 & 18 Geo. 5. c. iv (N.I.)	31 May 1927
An Act to empower the Coleraine Harbour Commissioners to construct works to improve the navigation of the River Bann, and for other purposes.
Ministry of Home Affairs Provisional Orders Confirmation Act (Northern Ireland) 1927	17 & 18 Geo. 5. c. v (N.I.)	21 December 1927
An Act to confirm certain Provisional Orders of the Ministry of Home Affairs relating to the Rural District of Ballycastle and the Urban Districts of Bangor and Ballymena.
	Cushendall Waterworks Order 1927 Provisional Order to enable the Council of the Rural District of Ballycastle to put in force the compulsory clauses of the Lands Clauses Acts.	

==== Private acts ====
Short title, or popular name	Citation	Royal assent
Long title
Lemon's Divorce Act (Northern Ireland) 1927	17 & 18 Geo. 5. c. 1 Pr. (N.I.)	21 December 1927
An Act to dissolve the Marriage of Elizabeth Lemon, of 12 Winsford House, Northumberland Street, Middlesex, with John Workman Lemon, her now husband, and to enable her to marry again; and for other purposes.

==== Sources ====
- The Public General Acts of 1927 passed in the Seventeenth and Eighteenth Years of the Reign of His Majesty King George the Fifth, being the Third Session of the Second Parliament of Northern Ireland. Belfast: William Richard Codling – via Google Books.

=== 1928 ===
==== Public acts ====
Short title, or popular name	Citation	Royal assent
Long title
Consolidated Fund Act (Northern Ireland) 1928	18 Geo. 5. c. 1 (N.I.)	29 March 1928
An Act to apply certain Sums out of the Consolidated Fund of Northern Ireland to the service of the year ended on the thirty-first day of March, nineteen hundred and twenty-seven, and of the years ending on the thirty-first day of March, nineteen hundred and twenty-eight, and the thirty-first day of March, nineteen hundred and twenty-nine.
Loans Guarantee Act (Northern Ireland) 1928	18 Geo. 5. c. 2 (N.I.)	29 March 1928
An Act to amend the Loans Guarantee Acts (Northern Ireland), 1922 to 1927, by extending the period within which the Ministry of Finance may give guarantees under the said Acts.
Unemployment Insurance Act (Northern Ireland) 1928	18 Geo. 5. c. 3 (N.I.)	17 April 1928
An Act to amend the Unemployment Insurance Acts (Northern Ireland), 1920 to 1926.
Constabulary Act (Northern Ireland) 1928	18 & 19 Geo. 5. c. 4 (N.I.)	4 June 1928
An Act to amend the provisions of the Constabulary Act (Northern Ireland), 1922, with respect to the distribution and the free quota of the Royal Ulster Constabulary; to enable certain payments to be made towards the cost of the employment of the said Constabulary and the Special Constabulary in the county borough of Belfast; and otherwise to amend the law with respect to Constabulary matters.
Legitimacy Act (Northern Ireland) 1928	18 & 19 Geo. 5. c. 5 (N.I.)	4 June 1928
An Act to amend the law relating to children born out of wedlock.
Superannuation and Other Trust Funds (Validation) Act (Northern Ireland) 1928 (repealed)	18 & 19 Geo. 5. c. 6 (N.I.)	4 June 1928
An Act to amend the law relating to perpetuities and accumulations, as respects certain benefit funds. (Repealed by Social Security Pensions (Northern Ireland) Order 1975 (SI 1975/1503))
Education Associations Act (Northern Ireland) 1928 (repealed)	18 & 19 Geo. 5. c. 7 (N.I.)	4 June 1928
An Act to provide for and regulate the payment of expenses incurred by education authorities and committees in connection with membership and meetings of education associations. (Repealed by Education Act (Northern Ireland) 1947 (c. 3 (N.I.))
School Sites Act (Northern Ireland) 1928	18 & 19 Geo. 5. c. 8 (N.I.)	4 June 1928
An Act to amend the Leases for Schools (Ireland) Act, 1881, (Note: Leases for Schools (Ireland) Act 1881 (44 & 45 Vict. c. 65)) and otherwise to make provision for enabling certain leases and grants to be made for school purposes.
Finance Act (Northern Ireland) 1928	18 & 19 Geo. 5. c. 9 (N.I.)	4 June 1928
An Act to grant a duty of Excise upon certain licences, and to amend the law relating to certain other duties of Excise and to stamp duty.
Roads Improvement Act (Northern Ireland) 1928	18 & 19 Geo. 5. c. 10 (N.I.)	4 June 1928
An Act to make further provision with respect to the compulsory acquisition of land for roads and streets, to confer further powers upon local authorities for the improvement of roads and streets, and for the prevention of danger to persons using the same and the relief of congestion of traffic, and for other purposes connected therewith.
National Health Insurance Act (Northern Ireland) 1928	18 & 19 Geo. 5. c. 11 (N.I.)	4 June 1928
An Act to provide for the application to Northern Ireland of such Act as may be passed in the present session of the Parliament of the United Kingdom for amending the National Health Insurance Act, 1924, (Note: National Health Insurance Act 1924 (14 & 15 Geo. 5. c. 38)) and other enactments relating to health insurance, and otherwise to amend the law relating to health insurance as respects Northern Ireland.
Appropriation Act (Northern Ireland) 1928	18 & 19 Geo. 5. c. 12 (N.I.)	4 June 1928
An Act to apply a Sum out of the Consolidated Fund of Northern Ireland to the service of the year ending on the thirty-first day of March, nineteen hundred and twenty-nine, and to appropriate the Supplies granted in this Session of Parliament.
Fisheries Act (Northern Ireland) 1928	18 & 19 Geo. 5. c. 13 (N.I.)	4 June 1928
An Act to amend the Fisheries (Ireland) Acts, 1842 to 1921, to provide for the regulation of the sale of salmon, trout and eels, and to make further provision for the preservation of the fisheries in Northern Ireland.
Administrative Provisions Act (Northern Ireland) 1928	18 & 19 Geo. 5. c. 14 (N.I.)	4 June 1928
An Act to amend the enactments which relate to the making of the appointments of Official Arbitrators, the Government Chemist, Auditors of Educational Endowments, and Officers for the purpose of obtaining probate or letters of administration in the case of small estates.
Civil Authorities (Special Powers) Act (Northern Ireland) 1928	18 & 19 Geo. 5. c. 15 (N.I.)	4 June 1928
An Act to extend the duration of the Civil Authorities (Special Powers) Act (Northern Ireland), 1922.
Expiring Laws Continuance Act (Northern Ireland) 1928	18 & 19 Geo. 5. c. 16 (N.I.)	18 December 1928
An Act to continue certain Expiring Laws as respects Northern Ireland.
Marketing of Potatoes Act (Northern Ireland) 1928	18 & 19 Geo. 5. c. c. 17 (N.I.)	18 December 1928
An Act to provide for the maintenance of proper standards of quality in connection with the marketing of potatoes in certain cases, and for the licensing of persons engaged in such marketing; and for other purposes connected therewith.
Poor Relief (Exceptional Distress) Act (Northern Ireland) 1928	18 & 19 Geo. 5. c. 18 (N.I.)	18 December 1928
An Act to amend the provisions of the Local Government (Ireland) Act, 1898, (Note: Local Government (Ireland) Act 1898 (61 & 62 Vict. c. 37)) with respect to the relief of exceptional distress.
Rent and Mortgage Interest (Restrictions) Act (Northern Ireland) 1928	18 & 19 Geo. 5. c. 19 (N.I.)	18 December 1928
An Act to prolong the duration of the Increase of Rent and Mortgage Interest (Restrictions) Act, 1920, (Note: Increase of Rent and Mortgage Interest (Restrictions) Act 1920 (10 & 11 Geo. 5. c. 17)) in its application to dwelling-houses of which the rateable value does not exceed twenty-six pounds, and to mortgages comprising such dwelling-houses.
Loans Guarantee (No. 2) Act (Northern Ireland) 1928	18 & 19 Geo. 5. c. 20 (N.I.)	18 December 1928
An Act to amend the Loans Guarantee Acts (Northern Ireland), 1922 to 1928, by increasing the amount of loans which may be guaranteed under the said Acts and extending the period within which the Ministry of Finance may give guarantees thereunder.
Queen's University of Belfast Act (Northern Ireland) 1928 (repealed)	18 & 19 Geo. 5. c. 21 (N.I.)	18 December 1928
An Act to make provision for the payment of additional grants to the Queen's University of Belfast, and for defraying certain expenses of the Agricultural Faculty of the said University, and to empower the governing body of the said University to borrow money. (Repealed by Agriculture (Northern Ireland) Order 2004 (SI 2004/3327))
Borough Funds Act (Northern Ireland) 1928	18 & 19 Geo. 5. c. 22 (N.I.)	18 December 1928
An Act to amend the Borough Funds (Ireland) Act, 1888. (Note: Borough Funds (Ireland) Act 1888 (51 & 52 Vict. c. 53))
Housing Act (Northern Ireland) 1928	18 & 19 Geo. 5. c. 23 (N.I.)	18 December 1928
An Act to prolong the time for the operation of section one of the Housing Act (Northern Ireland), 1927. (Note: Housing Act (Northern Ireland) 1927 (17 & 18 Geo. 5. c. 15 (N.I.)))
Representation of the People Act (Northern Ireland) 1928	18 & 19 Geo. 5. c. 24 (N.I.)	4 December 1928
An Act to assimilate the franchises for men and women in respect of parliamentary and local government elections; to amend the law with respect to the parliamentary and local government franchises; and for purposes connected therewith.
Game Preservation Act (Northern Ireland) 1928	18 & 19 Geo. 5. c. 25 (N.I.)	18 December 1928
An Act to make further provision for the preservation of game, and for the regulation of the sale of game, in Northern Ireland.
Slaughtered Animals (Compensation) Act (Northern Ireland) 1928	18 & 19 Geo. 5. c. 26 (N.I.)	18 December 1928
An Act to provide for the establishment, maintenance and management of a fund for the payment of compensation to the owners of certain live stock, which are exported from Northern Ireland and slaughtered under the authority of law at a port in Great Britain in consequence of an outbreak, or suspected outbreak or apprehended danger of, foot and mouth disease; and to make provision for the method of investigating and determining claims for such compensation.
Marketing of Eggs Act (Northern Ireland) 1928	18 & 19 Geo. 5. c. 27 (N.I.)	18 December 1928
An Act to amend and extend the provisions of the Marketing of Eggs Acts (Northern Ireland), 1924 and 1926.
Appropriation (No. 2) Act (Northern Ireland) 1928	18 & 19 Geo. 5. c. 28 (N.I.)	18 December 1928
An Act to apply a Sum out of the Consolidated Fund of Northern Ireland to the service of the year ending on the thirty-first day of March, nineteen hundred and twenty-nine, and to appropriate the further Supplies granted in this Session of Parliament.
Finance (No. 2) Act (Northern Ireland) 1928	18 & 19 Geo. 5. c. 29 (N.I.)	18 December 1928
An Act to grant a stamp duty upon certain bankers' licences, and to amend the law relating to stamp duty and a duty of Excise.
Rating and Valuation (Apportionment) Act (Northern Ireland) 1928 (repealed)	18 & 19 Geo. 5. c. 30 (N.I.)	18 December 1928
An Act to make provision with a view to the grant of relief from rates in respect of certain classes of hereditaments in Northern Ireland, for the distinction in valuation lists of the classes of hereditaments to be affected, and the apportionment in valuation lists of the net annual values of such hereditaments according to the extent of the user thereof for various purposes. (Repealed by Rates (Northern Ireland) Order 1972 (SI 1972/1633)

==== Local acts ====
Short title, or popular name	Citation	Royal assent
Long title
Belfast Corporation Act (Northern Ireland) 1928	18 & 19 Geo. 5. c. i (N.I.)	4 June 1928
An Act to empower the Lord Mayor Aldermen and Citizens of the City of Belfast to alienate lands for Hospital purposes; and for other purposes.
Hampton House School Act (Northern Ireland) 1928	18 & 19 Geo. 5. c. ii (N.I.)	4 June 1928
An Act to authorize the payment of Retiring Allowances Annuities and Costs out of the Funds of the Hampton House Industrial School for Girls and to enable such Funds to be administered cy-près and for other purposes.
London Midland and Scottish Railway Act (Northern Ireland) 1928	18 & 19 Geo. 5. c. iii (N.I.)	4 June 1928
An Act to Empower the London Midland and Scottish Railway Company to construct a Railway and other works and to acquire Lands; and for other purposes.
Dromore Urban District Council Act (Northern Ireland) 1928	18 & 19 Geo. 5. c. iv (N.I.)	4 June 1928
An Act to enable the Urban District Council of Dromore, County Down, to extend their borrowing powers to a Sum not exceeding £15,000 over and above and in addition to the borrowing powers conferred upon Urban District Councils by Section 238 (2) of the Public Health (Ireland) Act, 1878. (Note: Public Health (Ireland) Act 1878 (41 & 42 Vict. c. 52))
Methodist Church in Ireland Act (Northern Ireland) 1928	18 & 19 Geo. 5. c. v (N.I.)	4 June 1928
An Act to give statutory effect to the Constitution of the Religious Body known as the Methodist Church in Ireland and to provide for the alteration and amendment of same, to confer additional powers upon the Annual Conference of said Church, to confer additional powers upon the Statutory Trustees incorporated by the Methodist Church in Ireland Act, 1915, (Note: Methodist Church in Ireland Act 1915 (5 & 6 Geo. 5. c. xlvi)) to enable trusts to be declared in favour of such Church, to provide for Conduct of Proceedings of Conference and other purposes in relation thereto.
Methodist College Act (Northern Ireland) 1928	18 & 19 Geo. 5. c. vi (N.I.)	4 June 1928
An Act to separate and transfer the Theological Endowments of the Methodist College, Belfast; to incorporate the Governing Bodies of the Methodist College, Belfast, and of the Edgehill Theological College, Belfast; to provide for the management and administration of the said respective Colleges, and the Endowments thereof respectively, and for other purposes.
Ministry of Home Affairs Provisional Order Confirmation (Dromore Waterworks) Act (Northern Ireland) 1928	18 & 19 Geo. 5. c. vii (N.I.)	4 June 1928
An Act to confirm a Provisional Order of the Ministry of Home Affairs relating to the Urban District of Dromore.
	Dromore Waterworks Order 1928 Provisional Order to enable the Council of the Urban District of Dromore to put in force the compulsory clauses of the Lands Clauses Acts.	
Antrim Electricity Supply Act (Northern Ireland) 1928	18 & 19 Geo. 5. c. viii (N.I.)	18 December 1928
An Act for incorporating and conferring powers on the Antrim Electricity Supply Company and for other purposes.

==== Private acts ====
Short title, or popular name	Citation	Royal assent
Long title
McMullan's Divorce Act (Northern Ireland) 1928	18 & 19 Geo. 5. c. 1 Pr. (N.I.)	18 December 1928
An Act to dissolve the marriage of James McMullan, of Portstewart, in the County of Londonderry, with Mary McMullan, his now wife, and to enable him to marry again; and for other purposes.
Egan's Divorce Act (Northern Ireland) 1928	18 & 19 Geo. 5. c. 2 Pr. (N.I.)	18 December 1928
An Act to dissolve the marriage of Alexander Howard Egan, of Wembley, Fonseca Road, Columbo, Ceylon, with Lyle Egan, his now wife, and to enable him to marry again; and for other purposes.

==== Sources ====
- The Public General Acts of 1928 passed in the Eighteenth and Nineteenth Years of the Reign of His Majesty King George the Fifth, being the Fourth Session of the Second Parliament of Northern Ireland. Vol. VIII. Belfast: William Richard Codling. 1929 – via Google Books.

=== 1929 ===
==== Public acts ====
Short title, or popular name	Citation	Royal assent
Long title
Unemployment Insurance (Agreement) Act (Northern Ireland) 1929	19 Geo. 5. c. 1 (N.I.)	27 March 1929
An Act to confirm and give effect to an agreement made between the Treasury of the United Kingdom and the Ministry of Finance for Northern Ireland for continuing the agreement set forth in the Unemployment Insurance (Agreement) Act (Northern Ireland), 1926. (Note: Unemployment Insurance (Agreement) Act (Northern Ireland) 1926 (16 Geo. 5. c. 1 (N.I.)))
Appropriation Act (Northern Ireland) 1929	19 Geo. 5. c. 2 (N.I.)	25 March 1929
An Act to apply certain Sums out of the Consolidated Fund of Northern Ireland to the service of the years ending on the thirty-first day of March, nineteen hundred and twenty-nine and the thirty-first day of March, nineteen hundred and thirty, and to appropriate the Supplies granted in this Session of Parliament.
Exchequer and Financial Provisions Act (Northern Ireland) 1929	19 Geo. 5. c. 3 (N.I.)	27 March 1929
An Act to provide for the establishment of a Rating Relief Suspense Account, and to authorise the Ministry of Finance to guarantee the payment of certain agricultural loans, and for purposes connected therewith.
Industrial and Provident Societies (Amendment) Act (Northern Ireland) 1929	19 Geo. 5. c. 4 (N.I.)	16 April 1929
An Act to amend section twenty-two of the Industrial and Provident Societies Act, 1893, (Note: Industrial and Provident Societies Act 1893 (56 & 57 Vict. c. 39)) in its application to Northern Ireland.
House of Commons (Method of Voting and Redistribution of Seats) Act (Northern Ireland) 1929	19 Geo. 5. c. 5 (N.I.)	16 April 1929
An Act to amend the law with respect to the method of voting at Elections of Members to serve in the Parliament of Northern Ireland, and to provide for the Redistribution of Seats at such Elections, and for other purposes connected therewith.
Midwives and Nursing Homes Act (Northern Ireland) 1929 (repealed)	19 Geo. 5. c. 6 (N.I.)	16 April 1929
An Act to amend the Midwives (Ireland) Act, 1918, (Note: Midwives (Ireland) Act 1918 (7 & 8 Geo. 5. c. 59)) and to provide for the registration and inspection of nursing homes, and for purposes connected therewith. (Repealed by Nursing Homes and Nursing Agencies Act (Northern Ireland) 1971 (c. 32 (N.I.)))
Unemployment Insurance (Transitional Provisions Amendment) Act (Northern Ireland) 1929	19 Geo. 5. c. 7 (N.I.)	16 April 1929
An Act to amend sub-section (2) of section eighteen of the Unemployment Insurance Act (Northern Ireland), 1928, (Note: Unemployment Insurance Act (Northern Ireland) 1928 (18 Geo. 5. c. 3 (N.I.))) by extending to twenty-four months the period of twelve months therein mentioned.
Petroleum (Amendment) Act (Northern Ireland) 1929	19 Geo. 5. c. 8 (N.I.)	16 April 1929
An Act to amend the Petroleum Acts, 1871, (Note: Petroleum Act 1871 (34 & 35 Vict. c. 105)) and 1879, (Note: Petroleum Act 1879 (42 & 43 Vict. c. 47)) and other enactments relating to petroleum, in their application to Northern Ireland.
Bankruptcy (Amendment) Act (Northern Ireland) 1929 (repealed)	20 Geo. 5. c. 1 (N.I.)	11 July 1929
An Act to amend the laws relating to bankruptcy and to debtors in Northern Ireland, and for purposes related to or incidental to the matters aforesaid. (Repealed by Insolvency (Northern Ireland) Order 1989 (SI 1989/2405)
Finance Act (Northern Ireland) 1929	20 Geo. 5. c. 2 (NI)	11 July 1929
An Act to amend the law relating to Stamp Duty in certain cases, and to make further provision in connection with Finance.
Noxious Weeds Act (Northern Ireland) 1929	20 Geo. 5. c. 3 (NI)	11 July 1929
An Act to amend the Weeds and Agricultural Seeds (Ireland) Act, 1909, (Note: Weeds and Agricultural Seeds (Ireland) Act 1909 (9 Edw. 7. c. 31)) in its application to noxious weeds.
Loans Guarantee Act (Northern Ireland) 1929	20 Geo. 5. c. 4 (N.I)	11 July 1929
An Act to amend the Loans Guarantee Acts (Northern Ireland), 1922 to 1928, by increasing the amount of loans which may be guaranteed under the said Acts and extending the period within which the Ministry of Finance may give guarantees thereunder.
Government Loans (Amendment) Act (Northern Ireland) 1929	20 Geo. 5. c. 5 (N.I.)	11 July 1929
An Act to amend certain enactments relating to Government Loans Government Loans.
School Teachers (Oath and Declaration) Act (Northern Ireland) 1929	20 Geo. 5. c. 6 (N.I.)	11 July 1929
An Act to amend sub-section (2) of section five of the Local Government Act (Northern Ireland), 1922, (Note: Local Government Act (Northern Ireland) 1922 (12 & 13 Geo. 5. c. 16 (N.I.))) and the Promissory Oaths Act (Northern Ireland), 1923, (Note: Promissory Oaths Act (Northern Ireland) 1923 (13 & 14 Geo. 5. c. 7 (N.I.))) in their application to school teachers.
Appropriation Act (Northern Ireland) 1929 (Session 2)	20 Geo. 5. c. 7 (N.I.)	11 July 1929
An Act to apply a Sum out of the Consolidated Fund of Northern Ireland to the service of the year ending on the thirty-first day of March, nineteen hundred and thirty, and to appropriate the Supplies granted in this Session of Parliament.
Industrial Assurance and Friendly Societies Act (Northern Ireland) 1929	20 Geo. 5. c. 8 (N.I.)	11 July 1929
An Act to permit the issue by Friendly Societies and Industrial Assurance Companies in Northern Ireland of policies of assurance on the duration of certain lives for a specified period, to validate certain endowment policies issued by such societies and companies, to exclude repayments of premiums under endowment policies from the computation of the maximum sums which may be paid on death by such societies and companies, and to make provision as to the rights of owners of certain endowment policies upon the surrender thereof.
Street Trading (Regulation) Act (Northern Ireland) 1929	20 Geo. 5. c. 9 (N.I.)	11 July 1929
An Act to enable certain local authorities to regulate the carrying on of trading in streets within their areas, and for purposes connected therewith.
Local Government (Rating and Finance) Act (Northern Ireland) 1929 (repealed)	20 Geo. 5. c. 10 (N.I.)	11 July 1929
An Act to grant complete or partial relief from rates in the case of the hereditaments to which the Rating and Valuation (Apportionment) Act (Northern Ireland), 1928, (Note: Rating and Valuation (Apportionment) Act (Northern Ireland) 1928 (18 & 19 Geo. 5. c. 30 (N.I.))) applies; to extend the application of the said Act so as to enable the aforesaid relief to be granted to certain other hereditaments; to provide certain grants from the Exchequer of Northern Ireland in aid of the expenses of local authorities, and to discontinue certain other grants; and for purposes consequential on the matters aforesaid. (Repealed by Rates (Northern Ireland) Order 1972 (SI 1972/1633)
Expiring Laws Continuance Act (Northern Ireland) 1929	20 Geo. 5. c. 11 (N.I.)	19 December 1929
An Act to continue certain Expiring Laws as respects Northern Ireland.
Unemployment Insurance (State Contribution) Act (Northern Ireland) 1929	20 Geo. 5. c. 12 (N.I.)	19 December 1929
An Act to amend the Unemployment Insurance Acts (Northern Ireland), 1920 to 1929, with respect to the amount of the contribution to be paid under those Acts out of moneys provided by the Parliament of Northern Ireland.
Petroleum (Consolidation) Act (Northern Ireland) 1929 (repealed)	20 Geo. 5. c. 13 (N.I.)	19 December 1929
An Act to consolidate, as respects Northern Ireland, the enactments relating to petroleum and petroleum-spirit. (Repealed by Health and Safety at Work (Northern Ireland) Order 1978 (SI 1978/1039))
Marketing of Dairy Produce Act (Northern Ireland) 1929	20 Geo. 5. c. 14 (N.I.)	19 December 1929
An Act to provide for the maintenance of proper standards of quality in connection with the marketing of butter and cream in certain cases, for the licensing of persons engaged in such marketing, and for the registration of premises where butter or cream is produced or prepared for sale or consignment, and for other purposes connected therewith.
Adoption of Children Act (Northern Ireland) 1929	20 Geo. 5. c. 15 (N.I.)	19 December 1929
An Act to make provision for the adoption of infants.
Appropriation (No. 2) Act (Northern Ireland) 1929 (Session 2)	20 Geo. 5. c. 16 (N.I.)	19 December 1929
An Act to apply a Sum out of the Consolidated Fund of Northern Ireland to the service of the year ending on the thirty-first day of March, nineteen hundred and thirty, and to appropriate the further Supplies granted in this Session of Parliament.
Widows', Orphans' and Old Age Contributory Pensions Act (Northern Ireland) 1929	20 Geo. 5. c. 17 (N.I.)	19 December 1929
An Act to amend the Widows' Orphans' and Old Age Contributory Pensions Act (Northern Ireland), 1925, (Note: Widows' Orphans' and Old Age Contributory Pensions Act (Northern Ireland) 1925 (15 & 16 Geo. 5. c. 23 (N.I.))) section three of the Old Age Pensions Act, 1908, (Note: Old Age Pensions Act 1908 (8 Edw. 7. c. 40)) section three of the Old Age Pensions Act, 1919, (Note: Old Age Pensions Act 1919 (9 & 10 Geo. 5. c. 102)) the enactments regulating the right to become a voluntary contributor under the National Health Insurance Acts (Northern Ireland), 1924 to 1928, and the mode of collecting contributions under those Acts, and section ninety-six of the National Health Insurance Act, 1924; (Note: National Health Insurance Act 1924 (14 & 15 Geo. 5. c. 38)) and to provide for the exclusion of payments on account of widows' or orphans' pensions in the assessment of damages under the Fatal Accidents Acts, 1846 to 1908.
Housing Act (Northern Ireland) 1929	20 Geo. 5. c. 18 (N.I.)	19 December 1929
An Act to prolong further the time for the operation of section one of the Housing Act (Northern Ireland), 1927, and to amend certain enactments relating to Housing; and for other purposes connected therewith.
Criminal Lunatics Act (Northern Ireland) 1929 (repealed)	20 Geo. 5. c. 19 (N.I.)	19 December 1929
An Act to establish a Criminal Lunatic Asylum in Northern Ireland (Note: Londonderry Prison was designated as the "Criminal Lunatic Asylum, Northern Ireland". Prior to this, Northern Ireland continued to use the Central Criminal Lunatic Asylum, Dundrum, Dublin.) and to provide for the transfer and reception of criminal lunatics, and for purposes connected therewith. (Repealed by Mental Health (Northern Ireland) Order 1986 (SI 1986/595)
Drainage Act (Northern Ireland) 1929 (repealed)	20 Geo. 5. c. 20 (N.I.)	19 December 1929
An Act to constitute the Ministry of Finance as a drainage authority for the purpose of the drainage of Lough Neagh and the River Bann, and to abolish certain drainage and navigation authorities; to empower the said Ministry to carry out and maintain works for the said purpose; to provide for the making of contributions and the maintenance of certain drainage works by county councils; to amend the Drainage Act (Northern Ireland), 1925, (Note: Drainage Act (Northern Ireland) 1925 (15 & 16 Geo. 5. c. 24 (N.I.))) and for other purposes connected therewith. (Repealed by Drainage (Northern Ireland) Order 1973 (SI 1973/69)
Motor Vehicles and Road Traffic Act (Northern Ireland) 1929	20 Geo. 5. c. 21 (N.I.)	14 January 1930
An Act to amend the provisions of the Motor Vehicles (Traffic and Regulation) Act (Northern Ireland), 1926; (Note: Motor Vehicles (Traffic and Regulation) Act (Northern Ireland) 1926 (16 & 17 Geo. 5. c. 31 (N.I.))) to make further provision for the punishment of certain offences in connection with the driving of motor cars; to establish a Tribunal to fix fares and rates for certain public service vehicles; to empower the Ministry of Home Affairs to regulate general traffic on public highways; and for purposes connected therewith.

==== Local acts ====
Short title, or popular name	Citation	Royal assent
Long title
Belfast Water Act (Northern Ireland) 1929	20 Geo. 5. c. i (N.I.)	11 July 1929
An Act to confer further Powers on the Belfast City and District Water Commissioners.
Newry Urban District Council and Newry Port and Harbour Trust Act (Northern Ireland) 1929	20 Geo. 5. c. ii (N.I.)	11 July 1929
An Act to empower the Urban District Council of Newry to contribute towards the cost of the Repair and Improvement of the Newry Canal and Navigation, to acquire the Debenture and Mortgage Debts charged on the Newry Canal and Navigation, and to borrow money and to authorise the conversion of the Debenture Mortgage Debts charged on the Newry Canal and Navigation into irredeemable securities and for other purposes.
Londonderry Corporation (New Bridge) Act (Northern Ireland) 1929	20 Geo. 5. c. iii (N.I.)	11 July 1929
An Act to authorise the Mayor Aldermen and Burgesses of the City of Londonderry to construct a new bridge across the River Foyle within the City and to remove the existing Carlisle Bridge; and for other purposes.
Bangor Borough Council Act (Northern Ireland) 1929	20 Geo. 5. c. iv (N.I.)	11 July 1929
An Act to confer powers on the Council of the Borough of Bangor in the County of Down with respect to sewerage construction and sewage disposal works; To acquire lands for recreation purposes; To make further provisions in regard to the electricity undertaking of the Council; To make further provisions for the improvement, health and good government of the Borough; To confer various powers on the Council; and for other purposes.
Ministry of Home Affairs Provisional Order Confirmation (Carrickfergus Water) Act (Northern Ireland) 1929	20 Geo. 5. c. v (N.I.)	11 July 1929
An Act to confirm a Provisional Order of the Ministry of Home Affairs relating to the Urban District of Carrickfergus.
	Carrickfergus Water Order 1929 Provisional Order altering and amending the Belfast Water Act, 1874, (Note: Belfast Water Act 1874 (37 & 38 Vict. c. cli)) and the Belfast Water Act, 1879. (Note: Belfast Water Act 1879 (42 & 43 Vict. c. clxxii))	

==== Private acts ====
Short title, or popular name	Citation	Royal assent
Long title
Brown's Divorce Act (Northern Ireland) 1929	20 Geo. 5. c. 1 Pr. (N.I.)	27 March 1929
An Act to dissolve the marriage of James Boyle Brown, formerly of 47 Castlereagh Place, in the County of the City of Belfast, with Lily Brown, his now wife, and to enable him to marry again; and for other purposes.
Timbey's Divorce Act (Northern Ireland) 1929	20 Geo. 5. c. 2 Pr. (N.I.)	11 July 1929
An Act to dissolve the marriage of John Cecil Timbey, of 38 Myrtlefield Park, in the City of Belfast, with Eileen Patricia Stanley Timbey, his now wife, and to enable him to marry again; and for other purposes.
Patterson's Divorce Act (Northern Ireland) 1929	20 Geo. 5. c. 3 Pr. (N.I.)	19 December 1929
An Act to dissolve the marriage of Mary Jane Patterson, formerly of Roscrea, Helen's Bay, Co. Down, but now of Seahaven, Helen's Bay, Co. Down, with William Forbes Patterson, her husband, and to enable her to marry again, and for other purposes.
Rankin's Divorce Act (Northern Ireland) 1929	20 Geo. 5. c. 4 Pr. (N.I.)	19 December 1929
An Act to dissolve the marriage of Edith Winifred Rankin, of 15 Upper Crescent, Belfast, with Leslie M'Calmont Rankin, her husband, and to enable her to marry again, and for other purposes.
Burns's Divorce Act (Northern Ireland) 1929	20 Geo. 5. c. 5 Pr. (N.I.)	19 December 1929
An Act to dissolve the marriage of Mary Burns, formerly of Maxwell Road, Bangor, in the County of Down, but now of Lisburn and Hillsborough District Hospital, Lisburn, in the County of Antrim, with Harold Victor Burns, her husband, and to enable her to marry again, and for other purposes.

==== Sources ====
- The Public General Statutes passed by the Parliament of Northern Ireland in the Nineteenth and Twentieth Years of the Reign of His Majesty King George the Fifth. 1929. Vol. IX. Belfast: Council of Law Reporting. 1930 – via Google Books.

== 1930–1939 ==
=== 1930 ===
==== Public acts ====
Short title, or popular name	Citation	Royal assent
Long title
Unemployment Insurance (Amendment) Act (Northern Ireland) 1930	20 Geo. 5. c. 22 (N.I.)	24 February 1930
An Act to amend the Unemployment Insurance Acts (Northern Ireland), 1920 to 1929.
Consolidated Fund Act (Northern Ireland) 1930	20 & 21 Geo. 5. c. 1 (N.I.)	27 March 1930
An Act to apply certain Sums out of the Consolidated Fund of Northern Ireland to the service of the years ending on the thirty-first day of March, nineteen hundred and thirty, and the thirty-first day of March, nineteen hundred and thirty-one.
Public Roads Act (Northern Ireland) 1930	20 & 21 Geo. 5. c. 2 (N.I.)	30 April 1930
An Act to amend the provisions of the Grand Jury (Ireland) Act, 1836, (Note: Grand Jury (Ireland) Act 1836 (6 & 7 Will. 4. c. 116)) with respect to the width of public roads.
Criminal Law and Prevention of Crime (Amendment) Act (Northern Ireland) 1930	20 & 21 Geo. 5. c. 3 (N.I.)	30 April 1930
An Act to amend the law with respect to offences against persons under the age of sixteen, and to enable corporal punishment to be inflicted in Borstal Institutions.
Exchequer and Financial Provisions Act (Northern Ireland) 1930	20 & 21 Geo. 5. c. 4 (N.I.)	30 April 1930
An Act to amend the enactments relating to charges on the Consolidated Fund of Northern Ireland for the purposes of the Irish Sailors and Soldiers Land Trust, the guarantee by the Ministry of Finance of agricultural loans, the sale of tithe rentcharges whereof the proceeds are applicable under section three of the Exchequer and Financial Provisions Act (Northern Ireland), 1923, (Note: Exchequer and Financial Provisions Act (Northern Ireland) 1923 (13 & 14 Geo. 5. c. 4 (N.I.))) and the salary of the Comptroller and Auditor-General for Northern Ireland; and to authorise the making of an advance from the Government Loans Fund.
Housing Act (Northern Ireland) 1930	20 & 21 Geo. 5. c. 5 (N.I.)	30 April 1930
An Act to make further provision for preventing evasion of the requirements for grants, loans and exemptions from rates under section one of the Housing Act (Northern Ireland), 1923, (Note: Housing Act (Northern Ireland) 1923 (13 & 14 Geo. 5. c. 30 (N.I.))) and the enactments amending and extending that section.
Parliamentary and Local Government Elections Act (Northern Ireland) 1930	20 & 21 Geo. 5. c. 6 (N.I.)	17 June 1930
An Act to consolidate and amend the law relating to personation at parliamentary and local government elections, to amend section ninety-two of the Municipal Corporations Act, 1882, (Note: Municipal Corporations Act 1882 (45 & 46 Vict. c. 50)) in its application to local government election petitions, and for purposes connected therewith.
Appropriation Act (Northern Ireland) 1930	20 & 21 Geo. 5. c. 7 (N.I.)	17 June 1930
An Act to apply a Sum out of the Consolidated Fund of Northern Ireland to the service of the year ending on the thirty-first day of March, nineteen hundred and thirty-one, and to appropriate the Supplies granted in this Session of Parliament.
Unemployment Fund Act (Northern Ireland) 1930	20 & 21 Geo. 5. c. 8 (N.I.)	17 June 1930
An Act to raise to one million seven hundred and fifty thousand pounds the limit on the amount which may be outstanding at any time in respect of the advances by the Ministry of Finance for discharging the liabilities of the current account of the Northern Irish Unemployment Fund.
Labourers Act (Northern Ireland) 1930	20 & 21 Geo. 5. c. 9 (N.I.)	17 June 1930
An Act to make further provision for grants in aid of the repayment of certain loans to rural district councils for the purposes of the Labourers Acts (Northern Ireland), 1883 to 1927, and to extend the duration of the said Acts.
Railway and Canal Traffic (Amendment) Act (Northern Ireland) 1930	20 & 21 Geo. 5. c. 10 (N.I.)	17 June 1930
An Act to amend section forty-five of the Railway and Canal Traffic Act, 1888, (Note: Railway and Canal Traffic Act 1888 (51 & 52 Vict. c. 25)) in its application to the abandonment of unnecessary canals in Northern Ireland, and for purposes connected therewith.
Finance Act (Northern Ireland) 1930	20 & 21 Geo. 5. c. 11 (N.I.)	17 June 1930
An Act to alter certain Duties of Excise, the rates of Estate Duty, and the amount of the Fee payable to the Exchequer of Northern Ireland for certain motor car driving licences, and to make further provision in connection with Finance.
Companies Act (Northern Ireland) 1930	20 & 21 Geo. 5. c. 12 (N.I.)	17 June 1930
An Act to amend the Companies Acts, 1908 to 1917, and for purposes connected therewith.
National Health Insurance Act (Northern Ireland) 1930	20 & 21 Geo. 5. c. 13 (N.I.)	17 June 1930
An Act to provide for the inclusion of medical benefit amongst the benefits conferred upon insured persons in Northern Ireland by the enactments relating to health insurance and for the establishment of a sick visiting scheme under the said enactments; and for purposes related or incidental to the matters aforesaid.
Education Act (Northern Ireland) 1930 (repealed)	20 & 21 Geo. 5. c. 14 (N.I.)	17 June 1930
An Act to amend the Education Acts (Northern Ireland), 1923 (Note: Education Act (Northern Ireland) 1923 (13 & 14 Geo. 5. c. 21 (N.I.))) and 1925, (Note: Education Act (Northern Ireland) 1925 (15 Geo. 5. c. 1 (N.I.))) and for purposes connected therewith. Repealed by Education and Libraries (Northern Ireland) Order 1986 (SI 1986/594)
Expiring Laws Continuance Act (Northern Ireland) 1930	20 & 21 Geo. 5. c. 15 (N.I.)	25 November 1930
An Act to continue certain Expiring Laws as respects Northern Ireland.
Weights and Measures (Amendment) Act (Northern Ireland) 1930	20 & 21 Geo. 5. c. 16 (N.I.)	25 November 1930
An Act to amend the provisions of the Weights and Measures Acts with respect to measuring instruments, and the power to charge fees and the provision of local sub-standards and scales in connection with the testing of weighing and measuring apparatus, and with respect to the administration of the said Acts in certain boroughs.
Exchequer and Financial Provisions (No. 2) Act (Northern Ireland) 1930	20 & 21 Geo. 5. c. 17 (N.I.)	25 November 1930
An Act to amend the provisions of the Exchequer and Financial Provisions Act (Northern Ireland), 1923, with respect to the Reserve Fund and the Capital Fund established under that Act, and to provide for the application of certain moneys issued to the said Reserve Fund.
Constabulary Act (Northern Ireland) 1930	20 & 21 Geo. 5. c. 18 (N.I.)	25 November 1930
An Act to amend the Constabulary Acts (Northern Ireland), 1922 to 1928.
Third Parties (Rights Against Insurers) Act (Northern Ireland) 1930 (repealed)	20 & 21 Geo. 5. c. 19 (N.I.)	25 November 1930
An Act to confer on third parties rights against insurers of third-party risks in the event of the insured becoming insolvent, and in certain other events. (Repealed by Third Parties (Rights against Insurers) Act 2010 (c. 10))
Appropriation (No. 2) Act (Northern Ireland) 1930	20 & 21 Geo. 5. c. 20 (N.I.)	25 November 1930
An Act to apply a Sum out of the Consolidated Fund of Northern Ireland to the service of the year ending on the thirty-first day of March, nineteen hundred and thirty-one, and to appropriate the further Supplies granted in this Session of Parliament.
Electricity (Interim Supply) Act (Northern Ireland) 1930	20 & 21 Geo. 5. c. 21 (N.I.)	25 November 1930
An Act to confer certain powers upon the Ministry of Commerce with respect to the supply of electricity, pending the general development and co-ordination of the system of supply in Northern Ireland.
Tithe Rentcharge and Variable Rents Act (Northern Ireland) 1930	20 & 21 Geo. 5. c. 22 (N.I.)	25 November 1930
An Act to amend the law relating to tithe rentcharge and certain variable rents.
Agricultural Produce (Meat Regulation) Act (Northern Ireland) 1930	20 & 21 Geo. 5. c. 23 (N.I.)	25 November 1930
An Act to provide for the maintenance of proper standards of quality and the carrying out of inspections in connection with the marketing of certain kinds of meat; for the licensing of persons engaged in such marketing, and the registration of premises used for the slaughter of animals and otherwise for such marketing; and for other purposes connected therewith.
Motor Vehicles and Road Traffic Act (Northern Ireland) 1930	20 & 21 Geo. 5. c. 24 (N.I.)	25 November 1930
An Act to make further provision for the regulation of motor vehicles and traffic on roads; to provide for the protection of third parties against risks arising out of the use of motor vehicles and in connection with such provision to amend the Assurance Companies Act, 1909; and for other purposes connected with the matters aforesaid.

==== Local acts ====
Short title, or popular name	Citation	Royal assent
Long title
Mater Infirmorum Hospital (Incorporated) Extension Act (Northern Ireland) 1930	20 & 21 Geo. 5. c. i (N.I.)	17 June 1930
An Act to empower the Mater Infirmorum Hospital (Incorporated) in the City and County Borough of Belfast to acquire for Hospital purposes certain Lands adjacent to the Hospital and forming part of the Lands of His Majesty's Prison in the City of Belfast now vested in the Ministry of Home Affairs for Northern Ireland, and to empower the Ministry to convey such adjacent Lands for Hospital purposes to the Hospital, and for other purposes.
Belfast Corporation Act (Northern Ireland) 1930	20 & 21 Geo. 5. c. ii (N.I.)	17 June 1930
An Act to empower the Lord Mayor, Aldermen and Citizens of the City of Belfast to provide and work trolley vehicles; to provide for the disqualification of members of the Council in certain events; to make provision for the superannuation of certain officers of the Corporation; to confer further powers upon the Corporation with reference to rating and public health; and to confer various other powers upon the Corporation in relation to the good government of the City; and for other purposes.
Larne Urban District Council Act (Northern Ireland) 1930	20 & 21 Geo. 5. c. iii (N.I.)	25 November 1930
An Act to extend the boundaries of the Larne Urban District, to authorize the acquisition of markets, to make further provision as to collection of rates, to make further provision for the improvement and good government of the said district, and for other purposes.

==== Private acts ====
Short title, or popular name	Citation	Royal assent
Long title
Priestly's Divorce Act (Northern Ireland) 1930	20 Geo. 5. c. 1 Pr. (N.I.)	17 June 1930
McNulty's Divorce Act (Northern Ireland) 1930	20 Geo. 5. c. 2 Pr. (N.I.)	25 November 1930

==== Sources ====
- The Public General Statutes passed by the Parliament of Northern Ireland in the Twentieth and Twenty-First Years of the Reign of His Majesty King George the Fifth. 1930. Vol. X. Belfast: Council of Law Reporting. 1931 – via Google Books.

=== 1931 ===
==== Public acts ====
Short title, or popular name	Citation	Royal assent
Long title
Unemployment Insurance Act (Northern Ireland) 1931	21 & 22 Geo. 5. c. 1 (N.I.)	31 March 1931
An Act to raise to two million five hundred thousand pounds the limit on the amount which may be outstanding at any time in respect of the advances by the Ministry of Finance for discharging the liabilities of the current account of the Northern Irish Unemployment Fund; to amend sub-section (2) of section eighteen of the Unemployment Insurance Act (Northern Ireland), 1928, (Note: Unemployment Insurance Act (Northern Ireland) 1928 (18 Geo. 5. c. 3 (N.I.))) by further extending to forty-two months the period of twelve months therein mentioned; and to make provision for certain other matters in connection with the extension aforesaid.
Loans Guarantee Act (Northern Ireland) 1931	21 & 22 Geo. 5. c. 2 (N.I.)	31 March 1931
An Act to amend the Loans Guarantee Acts (Northern Ireland), 1922 to 1929, by making further provision with respect to the amount of loans which may be guaranteed under the said Acts, by extending the period within which the Ministry of Finance may give guarantees thereunder, and by enabling money to be borrowed for temporary payments in fulfilment of such guarantees.
Consolidated Fund Act (Northern Ireland) 1931	21 & 22 Geo. 5. c. 3 (N.I.)	31 March 1931
An Act to apply certain Sums out of the Consolidated Fund of Northern Ireland to the service of the years ending on the thirty-first day of March, nineteen hundred and thirty-one, and the thirty-first day of March, nineteen hundred and thirty-two.
Housing (Grants) Act (Northern Ireland) 1931	21 & 22 Geo. 5. c. 4 (N.I.)	30 April 1931
An Act to amend section one of the Housing Act (Northern Ireland), 1923, (Note: Housing Act (Northern Ireland) 1923 (13 & 14 Geo. 5. c. 30 (N.I.))) as amended by subsequent enactments.
Children (Amendment) Act (Northern Ireland) 1931	21 & 22 Geo. 5. c. 5 (N.I.)	30 April 1931
An Act to amend and extend Part I. of the Children Act, 1908, (Note: Children Act 1908 (8 Edw. 7. c. 67)) so as to make further provision for the protection of child life.
National Health Insurance Act (Northern Ireland) 1931 (repealed)	21 & 22 Geo. 5. c. 6 (N.I.)	30 April 1931
An Act to amend sub-section (3) of section three of the National Health Insurance Act, 1924, (Note: National Health Insurance Act 1924 (14 & 15 Geo. 5. c. 38)) and make financial provision in connection with such amendment, and to extend the provisions of section thirty-six of the said Act. (Repealed by (National Health Insurance Act 1936 (26 Geo. 5 & 1 Edw. 8. c. 32))
Marketing of Eggs Act (Northern Ireland) 1931	21 & 22 Geo. 5. c. 7 (N.I.)	26 May 1931
An Act to amend and extend the provisions of the Marketing of Eggs Acts (Northern Ireland), 1924 to 1928.
Marketing of Fruit Act (Northern Ireland) 1931	21 & 22 Geo. 5. c. 8 (N.I.)	26 May 1931
An Act to provide for the maintenance of proper standards of quality in connection with the marketing of fruit in certain cases and for the licensing of persons engaged in such marketing; and for other purposes connected therewith.
Electricity (Supply) Act (Northern Ireland) 1931 (repealed)	21 & 22 Geo. 5. c. 9 (N.I.)	26 May 1931
An Act to amend the law with respect to the supply of electricity. (Repealed by Electricity Supply (Northern Ireland) Order 1972 (SI 1972/1072)
Appropriation Act (Northern Ireland) 1931	21 & 22 Geo. 5. c. 10 (N.I.)	26 May 1931
An Act to apply a Sum out of the Consolidated Fund of Northern Ireland to the service of the year ending on the thirty-first day of March, nineteen hundred and thirty-two, and to appropriate the Supplies granted in this Session of Parliament.
Economy Act (Northern Ireland) 1931	21 & 22 Geo. 5. c. 11 (N.I.)	29 September 1931
An Act to authorise the making of Orders in the Privy Council of Northern Ireland for the purpose of effecting economies in expenditure falling to be defrayed out of public moneys and improvements in the arrangements for meeting such expenditure.
Planning and Housing Act (Northern Ireland) 1931	21 & 22 Geo. 5. c. 12 (N.I.)	13 October 1931
An Act to provide for the making of schemes laying down plans for the development or re-development of land; to make further provision with respect to the clearance and improvement of unhealthy areas and the demolition or repair of insanitary houses, and with respect to the application of the Second Schedule to the Housing of the Working Classes Act, 1890, (Note: Housing of the Working Classes Act 1890 (53 & 54 Vict. c. 70)) in certain cases; to amend certain enactments relating to the regulation of new buildings; and for purposes connected with the matters aforesaid.
Education Act (Northern Ireland) 1931	21 & 22 Geo. 5. c. 13 (N.I.)	13 October 1931
An Act to amend the provisions of the Education Acts (Northern Ireland), 1923 to 1930, relating to compulsory school attendance.
Wild Birds Protection Act (Northern Ireland) 1931	21 & 22 Geo. 5. c. 14 (N.I.)	13 October 1931
An Act to consolidate simplify and amend the Law relating to the Protection of Wild Birds.
Unemployment Insurance (No. 2) Act (Northern Ireland) 1931	21 & 22 Geo. 5. c. 15 (N.I.)	13 October 1931
An Act to raise to two million six hundred thousand pounds the limit on the amount which may be outstanding at any time in respect of the advances by the Ministry of Finance for discharging the liabilities of the current account of the Northern Irish Unemployment Fund; to amend sub-section (2) of section eighteen of the Unemployment Insurance Act (Northern Ireland), 1928, by further extending to forty-eight months the period of twelve months therein mentioned; and to make provision for certain other matters in connection with the extension aforesaid.
Workmen's Compensation Act (Northern Ireland) 1931	21 & 22 Geo. 5. c. 16 (N.I.)	13 October 1931
An Act to amend sub-section (4) of section nine of the Workmen's Compensation Act (Northern Ireland), 1927. (Note: Workmen's Compensation Act (Northern Ireland) 1927 (17 & 18 Geo. 5. c. 16 (N.I.)))
Widows', Orphans' and Old Age Contributory Pensions Act (Northern Ireland) 1931	21 & 22 Geo. 5. c. 17 (N.I.)	24 November 1931
An Act to amend section one of the Widows', Orphans' and Old Age Contributory Pensions Act (Northern Ireland), 1929, (Note: Widows', Orphans' and Old Age Contributory Pensions Act (Northern Ireland) 1929 (20 Geo. 5. c. 17 (N.I.))) so as to define for the purposes of the said section one the meaning of the expression "normal occupation," and so as to entitle to widows' pensions the widows of men who attained the age of seventy on or before the fifteenth day of July, nineteen hundred and twelve, and died on or after the fourth day of January, nineteen hundred and twenty'six, and whose normal occupation was, at some time within three years before the date on which they attained the said age, of a certain kind; to amend the provisions of the Widows', Orphans' and Old Age Contributory Pensions Acts (Northern Ireland), 1925 (Note: Widows' Orphans' and Old Age Contributory Pensions Act (Northern Ireland) 1925 (15 & 16 Geo. 5. c. 23 (N.I.))) and 1929, with respect to adopted children and the pensions of patients of unsound mind; to explain the extent to which the National Health Insurance Act, 1924, applies in the administration of the said Acts; and for purposes consequential upon the purposes aforesaid.
Expiring Laws Continuance Act (Northern Ireland) 1931	21 & 22 Geo. 5. c. 18 (N.I.)	22 December 1931
An Act to continue certain Expiring Laws as respects Northern Ireland.
Assurance Companies (Underwriters) Act (Northern Ireland) 1931	21 & 22 Geo. 5. c. 19 (N.I.)	22 December 1931
An Act to extend the provisions of the Assurance Companies Act, 1909, (Note: Assurance Companies Act 1909 (9 Edw. 7. c. 49)) in its application to underwriters.
Agricultural Research Station Act (Northern Ireland) 1931 (repealed)	21 & 22 Geo. 5. c. 20 (N.I.)	22 December 1931
An Act to confirm and give effect to an agreement relating to the Agricultural Research Station for Northern Ireland. (Repealed by Agriculture (Northern Ireland) Order 2004 (SI 2004/3327)
Appropriation (No. 2) Act (Northern Ireland) 1931	21 & 22 Geo. 5. c. 21 (N.I.)	22 December 1931
An Act to apply a Sum out of the Consolidated Fund of Northern Ireland to the service of the year ending on the thirty-first day of March, nineteen hundred and thirty-two, and to appropriate the further Supplies granted in this Session of Parliament.
Government Loans Act (Northern Ireland) 1931	21 & 22 Geo. 5. c. 22 (N.I.)	22 December 1931
An Act to authorise the writing off of certain sums from the assets of the Government Loans Fund.
National Health Insurance (No. 2) Act (Northern Ireland) 1931 (repealed)	21 & 22 Geo. 5. c. 23 (N.I.)	22 December 1931
An Act to amend sub-section (3) of section three of the National Health Insurance Act, 1924, (Note: National Health Insurance Act 1924 (14 & 15 Geo. 5. c. 38)) and to make financial provision in connection with such amendment, and to amend section twelve of the said Act as that section applies in Northern Ireland by virtue of section three of the National Health Insurance Act (Northern Ireland), 1930. (Note: National Health Insurance Act (Northern Ireland) 1930 (20 & 21 Geo. 5. c. 13 (N.I.))) (Repealed by (National Health Insurance Act 1936 (26 Geo. 5 & 1 Edw. 8. c. 32))
Finance Act (Northern Ireland) 1931	21 & 22 Geo. 5. c. 24 (N.I.)	22 December 1931
An Act to amend the law relating to Death Duties, Stamp Duty, the levying of certain Duties of Excise, and the Public Debt; and to make further provision in connection with Finance.
Drainage Act (Northern Ireland) 1931 (repealed)	21 & 22 Geo. 5. c. 25 (N.I.)	18 February 1932
An Act to amend the Drainage Acts (Northern Ireland), 1925 (Note: Drainage Act (Northern Ireland) 1925 (15 & 16 Geo. 5. c. 24 (N.I.))) and 1929. (Note: Drainage Act (Northern Ireland) 1929 (20 Geo. 5. c. 20 (N.I.))) (Repealed by Drainage (Northern Ireland) Order 1973 (SI 1973/69)

==== Local acts ====
Short title, or popular name	Citation	Royal assent
Long title
Belfast Harbour Act (Northern Ireland) 1931	21 & 22 Geo. 5. c. i (N.I.)	26 May 1931
An Act to enable the Belfast Harbour Commissioners to construct a tramway, and to levy additional rates and charges, and for other purposes.
The Incorporated Belfast Maternity Hospital and the Royal Victoria Hospital Act (Northern Ireland) 1931	21 & 22 Geo. 5. c. ii (N.I.)	26 May 1931
An Act to enlarge the objects of the Royal Victoria Hospital; to provide for the dissolution of the Incorporated Belfast Maternity Hospital and the application of the property and assets thereof; and for other purposes.
Donaghadee Urban District Council Act (Northern Ireland) 1931	21 & 22 Geo. 5. c. iii (N.I.)	26 May 1931
An Act to confer powers on the Urban District Council of Donaghadee in the County of Down as to borrowing money, construction of waterworks, acquisition of lands compulsorily or by agreement and for various other purposes.
Londonderry Corporation Act (Northern Ireland) 1931	21 & 22 Geo. 5. c. iv (N.I.)	26 May 1931
An Act to consolidate with amendments the statutory enactments relating to the Markets Undertaking of the Mayor Aldermen and Burgesses of the City of Londonderry and to confer further powers upon them with respect to that undertaking; to authorise them to construct street improvements and acquire lands; to confer further powers upon them with respect to their water and electricity undertakings; to make further provision for the health local government and improvement of the City and with respect to rating; and for other purposes.
Ministry of Home Affairs Provisional Order Confirmation (Banbridge Union Borrowing) Act (Northern Ireland) 1931	21 & 22 Geo. 5. c. v (N.I.)	13 October 1931
An Act to confirm a Provisional Order of the Ministry of Home Affairs relating to the Banbridge Union.
	Banbridge Union Order 1931 Provisional Order authorising the Guardians of the Banbridge Union to extend their borrowing powers under section 61 (6) of the Local Government (Ireland) Act, 1898. (Note: Local Government (Ireland) Act 1898 (61 & 62 Vict. c. 37))	
Ministry of Home Affairs Provisional Order Confirmation (Coleraine Waterworks) Act (Northern Ireland) 1931	21 & 22 Geo. 5. c. vi (N.I.)	22 December 1931
An Act to confirm a Provisional Order of the Ministry of Home Affairs relating to the Borough of Coleraine.
	Coleraine Waterworks Order 1931 Provisional Order to enable the Council of the Borough of Coleraine to put in force the compulsory clauses of the Lands Clauses Acts.	
Ministry of Home Affairs Provisional Order Confirmation (Tandragee Waterworks) Act (Northern Ireland) 1931	21 & 22 Geo. 5. c. vii (N.I.)	22 December 1931
An Act to confirm a Provisional Order of the Ministry of Home Affairs relating to the Urban District of Tandragee.
	Tandragee Waterworks Order 1931 Provisional Order to enable the Council of the Urban District of Tandragee to put in force the compulsory clauses of the Lands Clauses Acts.	
Ministry of Home Affairs Provisional Order Confirmation (Strangford Waterworks) Act (Northern Ireland) 1931	21 & 22 Geo. 5. c. viii (N.I.)	22 December 1931
An Act to confirm a Provisional Order of the Ministry of Home Affairs relating to the Rural District of Downpatrick.
	Strangford Waterworks Order 1931 Provisional Order to enable the Council of the Rural District of Downpatrick to put in force the compulsory clauses of the Lands Clauses Acts.	

==== Private acts ====
Short title, or popular name	Citation	Royal assent
Long title
McCleane's Divorce Act (Northern Ireland) 1931	21 & 22 Geo. 5. c. 1 Pr. (N.I.)	30 April 1931
Solomon's Divorce Act (Northern Ireland) 1931	21 & 22 Geo. 5. c. 2 Pr. (N.I.)	30 April 1931
Dobbs's Divorce Act (Northern Ireland) 1931	21 & 22 Geo. 5. c. 3 Pr. (N.I.)	5 May 1931
Anderson's Divorce Act (Northern Ireland) 1931	21 & 22 Geo. 5. c. 4 Pr. (N.I.)	26 May 1931
Macartney's Divorce Act (Northern Ireland) 1931	21 & 22 Geo. 5. c. 5 Pr. (N.I.)	26 May 1931
Robinson's Divorce Act (Northern Ireland) 1931	21 & 22 Geo. 5. c. 6 Pr. (N.I.)	22 December 1931
Harper's Divorce Act (Northern Ireland) 1931	21 & 22 Geo. 5. c. 7 Pr. (N.I.)	22 December 1931
Gibson's Divorce Act (Northern Ireland) 1931	21 & 22 Geo. 5. c. 8 Pr. (N.I.)	22 December 1931

==== Sources ====
- The Public General Acts of 1931-32 passed by the Twenty-First and Twenty-Second Years of the Reign of His Majesty King George the Fifth, being the Third Session of the Third Parliament of Northern Ireland. Belfast: William Richard Codling – via Google Books.

=== 1932 ===
==== Public acts ====
Short title, or popular name	Citation	Royal assent
Long title
Valuation Acts Amendment Act (Northern Ireland) 1932 (repealed)	21 & 22 Geo. 5. c. 26 (N.I.)	18 February 1932
An Act to make provision for the periodical revaluation of rateable property in Northern Ireland, and otherwise to amend the law relating to the valuation of such property. (Repealed by Rates (Northern Ireland) Order 1972 (SI 1972/1633))
Consolidated Fund Act (Northern Ireland) 1932	22 & 23 Geo. 5. c. 1 (N.I.)	24 March 1932
An Act to apply certain Sums out of the Consolidated Fund of Northern Ireland to the service of the year ended on the thirty-first day of March, nineteen hundred and thirty-one, and of the years ending on the thirty-first day of March. nineteen hundred and thirty-two, and the thirty-first day of March, nineteen hundred and thirty-two.
New Industries (Development) Act (Northern Ireland) 1932	22 & 23 Geo. 5. c. 2 (N.I.)	7 June 1932
An Act to authorise the making of grants to enable able sites to be obtained for new industries in Northern Ireland, and the exemption of such sites from local rates.
Housing (Grants) Act (Northern Ireland) 1932	22 & 23 Geo. 5. c. 3 (N.I.)	7 June 1932
An Act to amend section one of the Housing Act (Northern Ireland), 1923, as amended by subsequent enactments.
Railways (Valuation for Rating) Act (Northern Ireland) 1932 (repealed)	22 & 23 Geo. 5. c. 4 (N.I.)	7 June 1932
An Act to amend the law relating to the valuation for rating purposes of hereditaments occupied by railway companies, and for purposes connected therewith. (Repealed by Rates (Northern Ireland) Order 1972 (SI 1972/1633)
Poultry Diseases Act (Northern Ireland) 1932	22 & 23 Geo. 5. c. 5 (N.I.)	7 June 1932
An Act to empower the Ministry of Agriculture to apply the Diseases of Animals Acts, and to make orders thereunder, for the purpose of preventing contagious disease in poultry.
Loans Guarantee Act (Northern Ireland) 1932	22 & 23 Geo. 5. c. 6 (N.I.)	7 June 1932
An Act to amend the Loans Guarantee Acts (Northern Ireland), 1922 to 1931, by extending the period within which the Ministry of Finance may give guarantees under the said Acts.
Companies Act (Northern Ireland) 1932	22 & 23 Geo. 5. c. 7 (N.I.)	7 June 1932
An Act to consolidate the Companies Acts (Northern Ireland), 1908 to 1939, and certain other enactments connected with the said Acts.
Exported Animals (Compensation) Act (Northern Ireland) 1932	22 & 23 Geo. 5. c. 8 (N.I.)	7 June 1932
An Act to extend the provisions of the Slaughtered Animals (Compensation) Act (Northern Ireland), 1928, so as to enable compensation to be paid thereunder to the owners of certain live stock which are exported from a port in Northern Ireland and detained under the authority of law at a port in Great Britain in consequence of an outbreak, or suspected outbreak or apprehended danger, of foot and mouth disease; and otherwise to amend the said Act.
Slaughter of Animals Act (Northern Ireland) 1932	22 & 23 Geo. 5. c. 9 (N.I.)	7 June 1932
An Act to provide for the humane and scientific slaughter of animals; and for purposes connected therewith.
Appropriation Act (Northern Ireland) 1932	22 & 23 Geo. 5. c. 10 (N.I.)	7 June 1932
An Act to apply a Sum out of the Consolidated Fund of Northern Ireland to the service of the year ending on the thirty-first day of March, nineteen hundred and thirty-two, and to appropriate the Supplies granted in this Session of Parliament.
Motor Vehicles (International Race) Act (Northern Ireland) 1932	22 & 23 Geo. 5. c. 11 (N.I.)	7 June 1932
An Act to regulate the admission of motor vehicles to the area of the International Tourist Trophy Motor Race to be held in Northern Ireland in the year nineteen hundred and thirty-two.
National Health Insurance and Contributory Pensions Act (Northern Ireland) 1932	22 & 23 Geo. 5. c. 12 (N.I.)	7 June 1932
An Act to provide for the application to Northern Ireland of such Act as may be passed in the present session of the Parliament of the United Kingdom for amending certain enactments relating to Widows', Orphans and Old Age Contributory Pensions, and for purposes conned therewith.
Expiring Laws Continuance Act (Northern Ireland) 1932	22 & 23 Geo. 5. c. 13 (N.I.)	7 June 1932
An Act to continue certain Expiring Laws as respects Northern Ireland.
Rent and Mortgage Interest (Restrictions) Act (Northern Ireland) 1932	22 & 23 Geo. 5. c. 14 (N.I.)	7 June 1932
An Act to prolong the duration of the Rent and Mortgage interest (Restrictions) Acts (Northern Ireland=, 1920 to 1928, with respect the dwelling-houses and mortgages to which those Acts apply, and prevent the evasion of, the provisions of those Acts with respect to such dwelling-houses.
Mental Treatment Act (Northern Ireland) 1932	22 & 23 Geo. 5. c. 15 (N.I.)	7 June 1932
An Act to amend the Lunacy (Ireland) Acts, 1821 to 1901, and for other purposes connected therewith.
Land Law (Miscellaneous Provisions) Act (Northern Ireland) 1932	22 & 23 Geo. 5. c. 16 (N.I.)	7 June 1932
An Act to make provision with respect to the administration of certain matters by the Ministry of Finance in pursuance of the powers transferred to that Ministry from the Irish Land Commission, and to amend further the law relating to tithe rent-charge and variable rents.
Allotments Act (Northern Ireland) 1932	22 & 23 Geo. 5. c. 17 (N.I.)	7 June 1932
An Act to enable certain local authorities to provide allotments of land, and for other purposes incidental thereto.
Dangerous Drugs Act (Northern Ireland) 1932	23 & 24 Geo. 5. c. 1 (N.I.)	20 December 1932
An Act to amend the Dangerous Drugs Acts (Northern Ireland), 1920 to 1925, so far as is necessary in order to assimilate the law in Northern Ireland to the law in force in Great Britain in relation to certain dangerous drugs and drugs capable of being converted into dangerous drugs.
Appropriation (No. 2) Act (Northern Ireland) 1932	23 & 24 Geo. 5. c. 2 (N.I.)	20 December 1932
An Act to apply a Sum out of the Consolidated Fund Northern Ireland to the service of the year ending on the thirty-first day of March, nineteen hundred and thirty-three, and to appropriate the Supplies granted in this session of Parliament.
Transitional Payments (Determination of Need) Act (Northern Ireland) 1932	23 & 24 Geo. 5. c. 3 (N.I.)	20 December 1932
An Act to provide that certain rules shall be complied with in determining the need of applicants for transitional payments under the Unemployment Insurance (Economy) (No. 2) Order (Northern Ireland) 1931.

==== Local acts ====
Short title, or popular name	Citation	Royal assent
Long title
Bangor Borough Council Act (NorthernIreland) 1932	22 & 23 Geo. 5. c. i (N.I.)	7 June 1932
An Act to confer powers of the Council of the Borough of Bangor in the County of Down with respect to sewerage disposal works; to make provisions for the health and local Government of their district; and for other purposes
Ministry of Home Affairs Provisional Order Confirmation (Bangor and County of Down Financial Relations) Act (Northern Ireland) 1932	22 & 243 Geo. 5. c. ii (N.I.)	7 June 1932
An Act to confirm a Provisional Order of the Ministry of Home Affairs relating to the Borough of Bangor and the County of Down.
	Bangor and County of Down (Financial Relations) Order 1932 Provisional Order to alter the financial relations between the Borough of Bangor in the County of Down and the County of Down	
Ministry of Home Affairs Provisional Order Confirmation (Coleraine and Portstewart Waterworks) Act (Northern Ireland) 1932	22 & 23 Geo. 5. c. iii (N.I.)	7 June 1932
An Act to confirm a Provisional Order of the Ministry of Home Affairs relating to the Borough of Coleraine.
	Coleraine and Portstewart Waterworks Order 1932 Provisional Order to enable the Council of the Borough of Coleraine to put in force the compulsory clauses of the Lands Clauses Acts.	

==== Private acts ====
Short title, or popular name	Citation	Royal assent
Long title
Enniskillen's Divorce Act (Northern Ireland) 1932	23 & 24 Geo. 5. c. 1 Pr. (N.I.)	25 April 1932
An Act to dissolve the marriage of the Honourable John Henry Michael Cole, Earl of Enniskillen, with Irene Francis Cole, Countess of Enniskillen, his wife, and to enable him to marry again, and for other purposes.
Clarke's Divorce Act (Northern Ireland) 1932	23 & 24 Geo. 5. c. 2 Pr. (N.I.)	25 April 1932
An Act to dissolve the marriage of Francis John Clarke, of Bridge Street, Portadown, County Armagh, with Claire Elizabeth Mossman Clarke, of Ballydoulaghan, County Down, now his wife, and to enable him to marry again.
Hall's Divorce Act (Northern Ireland) 1932	23 & 24 Geo. 5. c. 3 Pr. (N.I.)	7 June 1932
An Act to dissolve the marriage of Robert Hall, junior, of 1 Royal Terrace, Lisburn Road, in the County of the City of Belfast, with Geraldine Elsie Hall, his now wife, and to enable him to marry again and for other purposes.

==== Sources ====
- The Public General Acts of 1931-32 passed by the Twenty-First and Twenty-Second Years of the Reign of His Majesty King George the Fifth, being the Third Session of the Third Parliament of Northern Ireland. Belfast: William Richard Codling – via Google Books.

=== 1933 ===
==== Public acts ====
Short title, or popular name	Citation	Royal assent
Long title
Legislative Procedure Act (Northern Ireland) 1933	23 & 24 Geo. 5. c. 4 (N.I.)	28 March 1933
An Act to provide for the recital in Acts passed by the Pariament of Northern Ireland of consents obtained for the purposes of section six or section nine of the Northern Ireland (Miscellaneous Provisions) Act 1932
Destructive Imported Animals Act (Northern Ireland) 1933	23 & 24 Geo. 5. c. 5 (N.I.)	28 March 1933
An Act to make provision for prohibiting or controlling the importation into and the keeping within Northern Ireland of destructive non-indigenous animals, for exterminating any such animals which may be at large, and for purposes connected with the matters aforesaid.
Stormont Regulation and Government Property Act (Northern Ireland) 1933	23 & 24 Geo. 5. c. 6 (N.I.)	28 March 1933
An Act to make provision with respect to the regulation of the Stormont Estate and the purchase and disposal of land for the public services.
Preferential Payments in Bankruptcy Act (Northern Ireland) 1933	23 & 24 Geo. 5. c. 7 (N.I.)	28 March 1933
An Act to amend the law with respect to preferential payments in bankruptcy and in the administration of insolvent estates in Northern Ireland.
Consolidated Fund Act (Northern Ireland) 1933	23 & 24 Geo. 5. c. 8 (N.I.)	28 March 1933
An Act to apply certain Sums out of the Consolidated Find pf Northern Ireland to the service of the years ending on the thirty-first day of March, nineteen hundred and thirty-three, and the thirty-first day of March, nineteen hundred and thirty-four.
Loans Guarantee Act (Northern Ireland) 1933	23 & 24 Geo. 5. c. 9 (N.I.)	28 March 1933
An Act to amend the Loans Guarantee Acts (Northern Ireland) 1922 to 1932, by extending the period within which the Ministry of Finance may give guarantees under the said Acts.
Exchequer and Financial Provisions Act (Northern Ireland) 1933	23 & 24 Geo. 5. c. 10 (N.I.)	28 March 1933
An Act to authorise the transfer of a sum from the Reserve Fund to the Exchequer; to extend the power of the Ministry of Finance to guarantee agricultural loans; to increase the maximum amount of the charges on the Consolidated Fund of Northern Ireland for the purposes of the Irish Sailors Land Trust; to provide for issues out of the said Consolidated Fund to the Road Fund and payments out of the Road Fund to the Exchequer; and to amend certain enactments relating to Exchequer borrowing, Government Loans, and certain investments of Government Funds.
Grey Seals Protection Act (Northern Ireland) 1933	23 & 24 Geo. 5. c. 11 (N.I.)	9 May 1933
An Act to make provision as respects Northern Ireland for the protection of the Grey Seal.
Civil Authorities (Special Powers) Act (Northern Ireland) 1933 (repealed)	23 & 24 Geo. 5. c. 12 (N.I.)	9 May 1933
An Act to amend sub-section (2) of section one of the Civil Authorities (Special Powers) Act (Northern Ireland), 1922, and toe xtend the duration of that Act. (Repealed by Northern Ireland (Emergency Provisions) Act 1973 (c. 53)
County Officers and Courts Act (Northern Ireland) 1933	23 & 24 Geo. 5. c. 13 (N.I.)	9 May 1933
An Act to amend the Law relating to County Officers, the County Court Service, County Courts and Courts of Quarter Sessions, and for purposes connected therewith.
Ardglass Dock and Harbour Act (Northern Ireland) 1933	23 & 24 Geo. 5. c. 14 (N.I.)	23 May 1933
An Act to amend the enactments relating to the Harbour of Ardglass in the County of Down and the inside Dock at the said Harbour.
Company Law Amendment Act (Northern Ireland) 1933	23 & 24 Geo. 5. c. 15 (N.I.)	23 May 1933
An Act to amend the Companies Act (Northern Ireland), 1932.
Probates and Letters of Administration Act (Northern Ireland) 1933	23 & 24 Geo. 5. c. 16 (N.I.)	23 May 1933
An Act to enable grants of probate of wills and letters of administration to be made to certain bodies corporate, and also in respect of deceased persons leaving no assets.
Appropriation Act (Northern Ireland) 1933	23 & 24 Geo. 5. c. 17 (N.I.)	13 June 1933
An Act to apply a Sum out of the Consolidated Fund of Northern Ireland to the service of the year ending on the thirty-first day of March, nineteen hundred and thirty-four, and to appropriate the Supplies granted in this Session of Parliament.
Motor Vehicles (International Race) Act (Northern Ireland) 1933	23 & 24 Geo. 5. c. 18 (N.I.)	13 June 1933
An Act to regulate the admission of motor vehicles to the area of the International Tourist Trophy Motor Race to be held in Northern Ireland on the year nineteen hudred and thirty-three.
Marketing of Dairy Produce Act (Northern Ireland) 1933	23 & 24 Geo. 5. c. 19 (N.I.)	13 June 1933
An Act to amend the Marketing of Dairy Produce Act (Northern Ireland=, 1929.
Unemployment Insurance Act (Northern Ireland) 1933	23 & 24 Geo. 5. c. 20 (N.I.)	13 June 1933
An Act to extend the periods of operation of certain enactments and statutory provisions relating to unemployment insurance, and to empower the Governor of Northern Ireland to make temporary provision by Order in Council for the amendment of the enactments and statutory provisions relating to the said matter.
Loans Guarantee (No. 2) Act (Northern Ireland) 1933	23 & 24 Geo. 5. c. 21 (N.I.)	13 June 1933
An Act to amend the Loans Guarantee Acts (Northern Ireland), 1922 to 1933, by enabling the Ministry of Finance to give guarantees under the siad Acts un respect of re-borrowings in certain cases where guaranteed loans are redeemed.
Agricultural Marketing Act (Northern Ireland) 1933	23 & 24 Geo. 5. c. 22 (N.I.)	13 June 1933
An Act to enable schemes to be made by the Ministry of Agriculture for regulating the marketing of agricultural products and to confer powers on boards administering such schemes; to enable the said Ministry to make regulations for regulating the removal from Northern Ireland into Great Britain of agricultural products the marketing of which is regulated by such schemes; and to provide for purposes connected with the matters aforesaid.
Moneylenders Act (Northern Ireland) 1933 (repealed)	23 & 24 Geo. 5. c. 23 (N.I.)	13 June 1933
An Act to amend the law with respect to persons carrying on business as moneylenders, and for purposes connected therewith. (Repealed by Consumer Credit Act 1974 (c. 39)
Exchequer and Financial Provisions (No. 2) Act (Northern Ireland) 1933	23 & 24 Geo. 5. c. 24 (N.I.)	9 November 1933
An Act to authorise the transfer of a sum from the Capital Fund to the Reserve Fund, and the transfer of sums from the Reserve Fund and certain other Funds to the Exchequer; and to make further provision for defraying certain expenditure in connection with the issue of Government stock or bonds, the equipment of constabulary premises, and for grants for voluntary schools.
Administrative Provisions Act (Northern Ireland) 1933	23 & 24 Geo. 5. c. 25 (N.I.)	9 November 1933
An Act to make further provision with respect to the administration of certain public services in Northern Ireland, and for purposes connected therewith.
Expiring Laws Continuance Act (Northern Ireland) 1933	23 & 24 Geo. 5. c. 26 (N.I.)	9 November 1933
An Act to continue certain Expiring Laws as respects Northern Ireland.
Constabulary Act (Northern Ireland) 1933	23 & 24 Geo. 5. c. 27 (N.I.)	9 November 1933
An Act to amend the provisions of the Constabulary Acts (Northern Ireland), 1922 to 1930, with respect to the payments to be made towards the cost of employment of the Royal Ulster Constabulary in the county borough of Belfast, and with respect to the compulsory acquisition of land and buildings for Constabulary purposes.
Finance Act (Northern Ireland) 1933	23 & 24 Geo. 5. c. 28 (N.I.)	9 November 1933
An Act to alter the rate of the Stamp Duty on certain statements, to amend the law relating to Stamp Duty and Entertainments Duty, and to exempt certain securities from Death Duties.
Sea Fishing Industry Act (Northern Ireland) 1933	23 & 24 Geo. 5. c. 29 (N.I.)	9 November 1933
An Act to regulate the sale of certain kinds of sea-fish.
Drainage Act (Northern Ireland) 1933 (repealed)	23 & 24 Geo. 5. c. 30 (N.I.)	9 November 1933
An Act to confirm and give effect to an agreement relating to the drainage of the River Quoile; to authorise the Fermanagh County Council to contribute a sum towards certain expenses in connection with the drainage of the Louth and River Erne; to amend the Drainage Acts (Northern Ireland), 1925 to 1931; and for other purposes connected therewith. (Repealed by Drainage (Northern Ireland) Order 1973 (SI 1973/69)
Criminal Justice Act (Northern Ireland) 1933	23 & 24 Geo. 5. c. 31 (N.I.)	9 November 1933
An Act to amend section ten of the Criminal Justice Administration Act, 1914, (Note: Criminal Justice Administration Act 1914 (4 & 5 Geo. 5. c. 58)) and sub-section (4) of section nineteen of the Criminal Appeal (Northern Ireland) Act, 1930, (Note: Criminal Appeal (Northern Ireland) Act 1930 (20 & 21 Geo. 5. c. 45)) and otherwise to amend the criminal law in Northern Ireland.
Housing Act (Northern Ireland) 1933	23 & 24 Geo. 5. c. 32 (N.I.)	9 November 1933
An Act to amend section one of the Housing (Grants) Act (Northern Ireland), 1932; to empower certain local authorities to advance money and give guarantees for the purpose of increasing housing accommodation; to enable the Ministry of Home Affairs to give financial assistance to such local authorities; and for purposes connected with the matters aforesaid.
Electricity (Supply) Act (Northern Ireland) 1933 (repealed)	23 & 24 Geo. 5. c. 33 (N.I.)	9 November 1933
An Act to amend the law with respect to the supply of Electricity. (Repealed by Electricity Supply (Northern Ireland) Order 1972 (SI 1972/1072)

==== Local acts ====
Short title, or popular name	Citation	Royal assent
Long title
Ministry of Home Affairs Provisional Order Confirmation (Coleraine and Portstewart Joint Board) Act (Northern Ireland) 1933	23 & 24 Geo. 5. c. i (N.I.)	13 June 1933
An Act to confirm a Provisional Order of the Ministry of Home Affairs relating to the Borough of Coleraine and the Urban District of Portstewart.
	Coleraine and Portstewart Joint Board Order 1933 Provisional Order forming a united district under section 12 of the Public Health (Ireland) Act, 1878.	
Ministry of Education Provisional Order Confirmation (County Antrim Education Authority) Act (Northern Ireland) 1933	23 & 24 Geo. 5. c. ii (N.I.)	13 June 1933
An Act to confirm a Provisional Order of the Ministry of Education relating to the Education Authority for the County of Antrim.
	Coleraine and Portstewart Joint Board Order 1933 Order as to the acquisition of land by the Education Authority for County Antrim.	
Ballymena Urban District Council Act (Northern Ireland) 1933	23 & 24 Geo. 5. c. iii (N.I.)	13 June 1933
An Act to make further provision as to the collection of rates within the Urban District of Ballymena; to confer further powers upon the Urban District Council of Ballymena with respect to their gas undertaking and in relation to public health and sanitary matter; to make further provision for the improvement and good government of the said district and for other purposes.
Ballyclare Urban District Council Act (Northern Ireland) 1933	23 & 24 Geo. 5. c. iv (N.I.)	13 June 1933
An Act to empower the Urban District Council of Ballyclare to acquire the property known as "Ballyclare Town Hall" and " Ballyclare Market House" and to release the Trustees of the said property from the Trusts thereof and to enable the Trustees to dispose of the Trust Funds.

==== Private acts ====
Short title, or popular name	Citation	Royal assent
Long title
Crawford's Divorce Act (Northern Ireland) 1933	23 & 24 Geo. 5. c. 1 Pr. (N.I.)	28 March 1933
Perry's Divorce Act (Northern Ireland) 1933	23 & 24 Geo. 5. c. 2 Pr. (N.I.)	28 March 1933
Taylor's Divorce Act (Northern Ireland) 1933	23 & 24 Geo. 5. c. 3 Pr. (N.I.)	28 March 1933
Sumner's Divorce Act (Northern Ireland) 1933	23 & 24 Geo. 5. c. 4 Pr. (N.I.)	23 May 1933
Morrison's Divorce Act (Northern Ireland) 1933	23 & 24 Geo. 5. c. 5 Pr. (N.I.)	13 June 1933
Donald's Divorce Act (Northern Ireland) 1933	23 & 24 Geo. 5. c. 6 Pr. (N.I.)	13 June 1933
Hunter's Divorce Act (Northern Ireland) 1933	23 & 24 Geo. 5. c. 7 Pr. (N.I.)	9 November 1933
Richards' Divorce Act (Northern Ireland) 1933	23 & 24 Geo. 5. c. 8 Pr. (N.I.)	9 November 1933
Cimamond's Divorce Act (Northern Ireland) 1933	23 & 24 Geo. 5. c. 9 Pr. (N.I.)	9 November 1933

=== 1934 ===
==== Public acts ====
Short title, or popular name	Citation	Royal assent
Long title
Consolidated Fund Act (Northern Ireland) 1934	24 & 25 Geo. 5. c. 1 (N.I.)	
Dogs' Protection Act (Northern Ireland) 1934	24 & 25 Geo. 5. c. 2 (N.I.)	8 May 1934
Finance (Stamp Duties) Act (Northern Ireland) 1934	24 & 25 Geo. 5. c. 3 (N.I.)	8 May 1934
Destructive Insects and Pests Act (Northern Ireland) 1934	24 & 25 Geo. 5. c. 4 (N.I.)	8 May 1934
Railways Act (Northern Ireland) 1934	24 & 25 Geo. 5. c. 5 (N.I.)	5 June 1934
An Act to amend the law relating to railways.
Agricultural Marketing Act (Northern Ireland) 1934	24 & 25 Geo. 5. c. 6 (N.I.)	5 June 1934
Representation of the People Act (Northern Ireland) 1934	24 & 25 Geo. 5. c. 7 (N.I.)	5 June 1934
Exceptional Distress (Transitional Provisions) Act (Northern Ireland) 1934	24 & 25 Geo. 5. c. 8 (N.I.)	28 June 1934
Appropriation Act (Northern Ireland) 1934	24 & 25 Geo. 5. c. 9 (N.I.)	28 June 1934
Constabulary Act (Northern Ireland) 1934	24 & 25 Geo. 5. c. 10 (N.I.)	28 June 1934
Motor Vehicles (International Race) Act (Northern Ireland) 1934	24 & 25 Geo. 5. c. 11 (N.I.)	28 June 1934
Unemployment Act (Northern Ireland) 1934	24 & 25 Geo. 5. c. 12 (N.I.)	28 June 1934
Finance Act (Northern Ireland) 1934	24 & 25 Geo. 5. c. 13 (N.I.)	28 June 1934
Marketing of Potatoes Act (Northern Ireland) 1934	24 & 25 Geo. 5. c. 14 (N.I.)	28 June 1934
Motor Vehicles and Road Traffic Act (Northern Ireland) 1934	24 & 25 Geo. 5. c. 15 (N.I.)	28 June 1934
Milk and Milk Products Act (Northern Ireland) 1934	24 & 25 Geo. 5. c. 16 (N.I.)	28 June 1934
Expiring Laws Continuance Act (Northern Ireland) 1934	24 & 25 Geo. 5. c. 17 (N.I.)	14 November 1934
Appropriation (No. 2) Act (Northern Ireland) 1934	24 & 25 Geo. 5. c. 18 (N.I.)	14 November 1934
Adoption of Children (Workmen's Compensation) Act (Northern Ireland) 1934	24 & 25 Geo. 5. c. 19 (N.I.)	14 November 1934
Exchequer and Financial Provisions Act (Northern Ireland) 1934	24 & 25 Geo. 5. c. 20 (N.I.)	14 November 1934
Fisheries Act (Northern Ireland) 1934	24 & 25 Geo. 5. c. 21 (N.I.)	14 November 1934
Local Government Act (Northern Ireland) 1934	24 & 25 Geo. 5. c. 22 (N.I.)	14 November 1934
An Act to amend the law relating to local government and for other purposes connected therewith.
Consolidated Fund (No. 2) Act (Northern Ireland) 1934	25 & 26 Geo. 5. c. 1 (N.I.)	21 December 1934
Diseases of Animals (Dairy Cattle) Act (Northern Ireland) 1934	25 & 26 Geo. 5. c. 2 (N.I.)	21 December 1934
Agricultural Marketing (Pig Industry) Act (Northern Ireland) 1934	25 & 26 Geo. 5. c. 3 (N.I.)	21 December 1934

==== Local acts ====
Short title, or popular name	Citation	Royal assent
Long title
Ministry of Home Affairs Provisional Order Confirmation (Portrush Waterworks) Act (Northern Ireland) 1934	24 & 25 Geo. 5. c. i (N.I.)	28 June 1934
Ministry of Home Affairs Provisional Order Confirmation (Cookstown Joint Hospital) Act (Northern Ireland) 1934	24 & 25 Geo. 5. c. ii (N.I.)	28 June 1934
Ministry of Home Affairs Provisional Order Confirmation (Coleraine Gasworks) Act (Northern Ireland) 1934	24 & 25 Geo. 5. c. iii (N.I.)	28 June 1934

==== Private acts ====
Short title, or popular name	Citation	Royal assent
Long title
Henry's Divorce Act (Northern Ireland) 1934	24 & 25 Geo. 5. c. 1 Pr. (N.I.)	24 April 1934
Anderson's Divorce Act (Northern Ireland) 1934	24 & 25 Geo. 5. c. 2 Pr. (N.I.)	24 April 1934
Gilbert's Divorce Act (Northern Ireland) 1934	24 & 25 Geo. 5. c. 3 Pr. (N.I.)	24 April 1934

=== 1935 ===
==== Public acts ====
Short title, or popular name	Citation	Royal assent
Long title
Consolidated Fund Act (Northern Ireland) 1935	25 & 26 Geo. 5. c. 4 (N.I.)	28 March 1935
Unemployment Assistance (Temporary Provisions) Act (Northern Ireland) 1935	25 & 26 Geo. 5. c. 5 (N.I.)	11 April 1935
Exchequer and Financial Provisions Act (Northern Ireland) 1935	25 & 26 Geo. 5. c. 6 (N.I.)	11 April 1935
Loans Guarantee Act (Northern Ireland) 1935	25 & 26 Geo. 5. c. 7 (N.I.)	17 April 1935
Education (Administrative Matters) Act (Northern Ireland) 1935 (repealed)	25 & 26 Geo. 5. c. 8 (N.I.)	16 July 1935
(Repealed by Education Act (Northern Ireland) 1947 (c. 3 (N.I.))
Electricity (Supply) Act (Northern Ireland) 1935 (repealed)	25 & 26 Geo. 5. c. 9 (N.I.)	16 July 1935
(Repealed by Electricity Supply (Northern Ireland) Order 1972 (SI 1972/1072)
Motor Vehicles (International Race) Act (Northern Ireland) 1935	25 & 26 Geo. 5. c. 10 (N.I.)	16 July 1935
Finance Act (Northern Ireland) 1935	25 & 26 Geo. 5. c. 11 (N.I.)	16 July 1935
Appropriation Act (Northern Ireland) 1935	25 & 26 Geo. 5. c. 12 (N.I.)	16 July 1935
Summary Jurisdiction and Criminal Justice Act (Northern Ireland) 1935	25 & 26 Geo. 5. c. 13 (N.I.)	16 July 1935
An Act to amend the law relating to the powers and duties of justices of the peace in general or quarter sessions and petty sessions and out of sessions; to assign the exercise and performance of certain of those powers and duties to resident magistrates exclusively; to make further provision with respect to petty sessions districts and the appointment of clerks of petty sessions; to amend the law relating to the powers and procedure of courts of summary jurisdiction in criminal and civil matters, and appeals from such courts; and to provide for purposes connected with the matters aforesaid.
National Health Insurance and Contributory Pensions Act (Northern Ireland) 1935	25 & 26 Geo. 5. c. 14 (N.I.)	16 July 1935
Road and Railway Transport Act (Northern Ireland) 1935	25 & 26 Geo. 5. c. 15 (N.I.)	16 July 1935
An Act to provide for the establishment of a Road Transport Board for Northern Ireland and for the transfer to that Board of various road transport undertakings and interests; to make other provisions with respect to transport; to amend the law relating to railways and canals; and for purposes connected with the matters aforesaid.
Lord Carson (Burial) Act (Northern Ireland) 1935	25 & 26 Geo. 5. c. 16 (N.I.)	23 October 1935
An Act to provide for the interment of the remains of the Right Honourable Edward Henry, Lord Carson in the Cathedral Church of St. Anne, Belfast.
Appropriation (No. 2) Act (Northern Ireland) 1935	25 & 26 Geo. 5. c. 17 (N.I.)	13 November 1935
Expiring Laws Continuance Act (Northern Ireland) 1935	25 & 26 Geo. 5. c. 18 (N.I.)	13 November 1935
Unemployment Assistance (Temporary Provisions) (No. 2) Act (Northern Ireland) 1935	25 & 26 Geo. 5. c. 19 (N.I.)	13 November 1935
Unemployment Insurance (Amendment) Act (Northern Ireland) 1935	25 & 26 Geo. 5. c. 20 (N.I.)	13 November 1935
Drainage Act (Northern Ireland) 1935 (repealed)	25 & 26 Geo. 5. c. 21 (N.I.)	13 November 1935
(Repealed by Drainage (Northern Ireland) Order 1973 (SI 1973/69)
Labourers Act (Northern Ireland) 1935	25 & 26 Geo. 5. c. 23 (N.I.)	13 November 1935
Diseases of Animals (Therapeutic Substances) Act (Northern Ireland) 1935	25 & 26 Geo. 5. c. 24 (N.I.)	13 November 1935
Road and Railway Transport (Redemption of Stock) Act (Northern Ireland) 1935	26 Geo. 5 & 1 Edw. 8. c. 1 (N.I.)	17 December 1935
An Act to amend the provisions of section nineteen of the Road and Railway Transport Act (Northern Ireland), 1935, with respect to the redemption of Northern Ireland Transport Stock.
Superannuation Act (Northern Ireland) 1935	26 Geo. 5 & 1 Edw. 8. c. 2 (N.I.)	17 December 1935

==== Local acts ====
Short title, or popular name	Citation	Royal assent
Long title
Ministry of Home Affairs Provisional Order Confirmation (Belfast Corporation Acquisition of Lands) Act (Northern Ireland) 1935	25 & 26 Geo. 5. c. i (N.I.)	16 July 1935
Apprentice Boys Memorial Hall, Londonderry Act (Northern Ireland) 1935	25 & 26 Geo. 5. c. ii (N.I.)	16 July 1935
An Act to confer powers on the Trustees of the Apprentice Boys Memorial Hall, Londonderry, to sell or otherwise dispose of certain land.

==== Private acts ====
Short title, or popular name	Citation	Royal assent
Long title
McWilliams' Divorce Act (Northern Ireland) 1935	25 & 26 Geo. 5. c. 1 Pr. (N.I.)	11 April 1935
Ferris's Divorce Act (Northern Ireland) 1935	25 & 26 Geo. 5. c. 2 Pr. (N.I.)	16 July 1935

=== 1936 ===
==== Public acts ====
Short title, or popular name	Citation	Royal assent
Long title
Unemployment (Agreement) Act (Northern Ireland) 1936	26 Geo. 5 & 1 Edw. 8. c. 3 (N.I.)	12 March 1936
Consolidated Fund Act (Northern Ireland) 1936	26 Geo. 5 & 1 Edw. 8. c. 4 (N.I.)	26 March 1936
Rent and Mortgage Interest (Restrictions) Act (Northern Ireland) 1936	26 Geo. 5 & 1 Edw. 8. c. 5 (N.I.)	26 March 1936
Exchequer and Financial Provisions Act (Northern Ireland) 1936	26 Geo. 5 & 1 Edw. 8. c. 6 (N.I.)	26 March 1936
Housing (Grants) Act (Northern Ireland) 1936	26 Geo. 5 & 1 Edw. 8. c. 7 (N.I.)	26 March 1936
Unemployment Assistance (Temporary Provisions) (Extension) Act (Northern Ireland) 1936	26 Geo. 5 & 1 Edw. 8. c. 8 (N.I.)	26 March 1936
Government Loans Act (Northern Ireland) 1936	26 Geo. 5 & 1 Edw. 8. c. 9 (N.I.)	26 March 1936
Local Government (Finance) Act (Northern Ireland) 1936 (repealed)	26 Geo. 5 & 1 Edw. 8. c. 10 (N.I.)	1 April 1936
(Repealed by Rates (Northern Ireland) Order 1972 (SI 1972/1633)
Revaluation (Consequential Provisions) Act (Northern Ireland) 1936	26 Geo. 5 & 1 Edw. 8. c. 11 (N.I.)	1 April 1936
Canals and Inland Navigation Act (Northern Ireland) 1936	26 Geo. 5 & 1 Edw. 8. c. 12 (N.I.)	9 April 1936
Unemployment Insurance (Agriculture) Act (Northern Ireland) 1936	26 Geo. 5 & 1 Edw. 8. c. 13 (N.I.)	9 April 1936
Milk and Milk Products Act (Northern Ireland) 1936	26 Geo. 5 & 1 Edw. 8. c. 14 (N.I.)	21 May 1936
Motor Vehicles (International Race) Act (Northern Ireland) 1936	26 Geo. 5 & 1 Edw. 8. c. 15 (N.I.)	21 May 1936
Electricity (Supply) Act (Northern Ireland) 1936	26 Geo. 5 & 1 Edw. 8. c. 16 (N.I.)	21 May 1936
Loans Guarantee Act (Northern Ireland) 1936	26 Geo. 5 & 1 Edw. 8. c. 17 (N.I.)	23 June 1936
Road and Railway Transport Act (Northern Ireland) 1936	26 Geo. 5 & 1 Edw. 8. c. 18 (N.I.)	23 June 1936
An Act to make further provision with respect to the constitution of the appeal tribunal for the purposes of the Road and Railway Transport Act (Northern Ireland, 1935.
Appropriation Act (Northern Ireland) 1936	26 Geo. 5 & 1 Edw. 8. c. 19 (N.I.)	23 June 1936
Marketing of Eggs Act (Northern Ireland) 1936	26 Geo. 5 & 1 Edw. 8. c. 20 (N.I.)	23 June 1936
Expiring Laws Continuance Act (Northern Ireland) 1936	26 Geo. 5 & 1 Edw. 8. c. 21 (N.I.)	12 November 1936
Appropriation (No. 2) Act (Northern Ireland) 1936	26 Geo. 5 & 1 Edw. 8. c. 22 (N.I.)	12 November 1936
Finance (Companies Stamp Duty) Act (Northern Ireland) 1936	26 Geo. 5 & 1 Edw. 8. c. 23 (N.I.)	12 November 1936
Vaughan's Charity (Administration) Act (Northern Ireland) 1936	26 Geo. 5 & 1 Edw. 8. c. 24 (N.I.)	12 November 1936
An Act to confirm a Scheme for the administration of the Charity of the late Henry Vaughan and for other purposes.
Census Act (Northern Ireland) 1936	26 Geo. 5 & 1 Edw. 8. c. 25 (N.I.)	12 November 1936
Teachers' Superannuation Act (Northern Ireland) 1936	26 Geo. 5 & 1 Edw. 8. c. 26 (N.I.)	12 November 1936
Close Seasons (Amendment) Act (Northern Ireland) 1936	26 Geo. 5 & 1 Edw. 8. c. 27 (N.I.)	12 November 1936
Employment of Women and Young Persons Act (Northern Ireland) 1936	26 Geo. 5 & 1 Edw. 8. c. 28 (N.I.)	12 November 1936
Exchequer and Financial Provisions (No. 2) Act (Northern Ireland) 1936	26 Geo. 5 & 1 Edw. 8. c. 29 (N.I.)	12 November 1936
Unemployment Insurance Act (Northern Ireland) 1936	26 Geo. 5 & 1 Edw. 8. c. 30 (N.I.)	12 November 1936
Old Age Pensions Act (Northern Ireland) 1936	26 Geo. 5 & 1 Edw. 8. c. 31 (N.I.)	12 November 1936
Widows', Orphans' and Old Age Contributory Pensions Act (Northern Ireland) 1936	26 Geo. 5 & 1 Edw. 8. c. 32 (N.I.)	12 November 1936
Finance Act (Northern Ireland) 1936	26 Geo. 5 & 1 Edw. 8. c. 33 (N.I.)	12 November 1936
An Act to grant a duty of excise upon certain licences; to amend the law relating to certain other duties of excise and death duties; to require the delivery to the Ministry of Finance of particulars as to transfers and lettings of land and for that purpose to amend the law relating to stamp duty; and to make further provision with respect to summary proceedings in revenue cases.

==== Local acts ====
Short title, or popular name	Citation	Royal assent
Long title
Pier and Harbour Order (Larne Harbour) Confirmation Act (Northern Ireland) 1936	26 Geo. 5 & 1 Edw. 8. c. i (N.I.)	9 April 1936
An Act to confirm a Provisional Order made by the Ministry of Commerce under the General Pier and Harbour Act, 1861, (Note: General Pier and Harbour Act 1861 (24 & 25 Vict. c. 45)) relating to Larne Harbour.
	Curran Pier (Larne Harbour) Order 1936 Provisional Order for amending the Curran Pier and Harbour Orders, 1871 and 1888.	

==== Private acts ====
Short title, or popular name	Citation	Royal assent
Long title
Agnew's Divorce Act (Northern Ireland) 1936	26 Geo. 5 & 1 Edw. 8. c. 1 Pr. (N.I.)	26 March 1936
Barbour's Divorce Act (Northern Ireland) 1936	26 Geo. 5 & 1 Edw. 8. c. 2 Pr. (N.I.)	1 April 1936
Bradshaw's Divorce Act (Northern Ireland) 1936	26 Geo. 5 & 1 Edw. 8. c. 3 Pr. (N.I.)	9 April 1936
Trew's Divorce Act (Northern Ireland) 1936	26 Geo. 5 & 1 Edw. 8. c. 4 Pr. (N.I.)	23 June 1936
McAughey's Divorce Act (Northern Ireland) 1936	26 Geo. 5 & 1 Edw. 8. c. 5 Pr. (N.I.)	12 November 1936

=== 1937 ===
==== Public acts ====
Short title, or popular name	Citation	Royal assent
Long title
Unemployment Assistance (Temporary Provisions) Act (Northern Ireland) 1937	1 Edw. 8 & 1 Geo. 6. c. 1 (N.I.)	24 March 1937
Consolidated Fund Act (Northern Ireland) 1937	1 Edw. 8 & 1 Geo. 6. c. 2 (N.I.)	24 March 1937
Local Government (Postponement of Elections) Act (Northern Ireland) 1937	1 Edw. 8 & 1 Geo. 6. c. 3 (N.I.)	29 April 1937
Petroleum (Transfer of Licences) Act (Northern Ireland) 1937 (repealed)	1 Edw. 8 & 1 Geo. 6. c. 4 (N.I.)	6 May 1937
An Act to make provision with respect to the transfer of petroleum-spirit licences granted under the Petroleum (Consolidation) Act (Northern Ireland), 1929. (Note: Petroleum (Consolidation) Act (Northern Ireland) 1929 (20 Geo. 5. c. 13 (N.I.)) (Repealed by Health and Safety at Work (Northern Ireland) Order 1978 (SI 1978/1039))
Horse Breeding Act (Northern Ireland) 1937	1 Edw. 8 & 1 Geo. 6. c. 5 (N.I.)	6 May 1937
Ancient Monuments Act (Northern Ireland) 1937	1 Edw. 8 & 1 Geo. 6. c. 6 (N.I.)	6 May 1937
Sale of Ice-Cream Act (Northern Ireland) 1937	1 Edw. 8 & 1 Geo. 6. c. 7 (N.I.)	7 July 1937
Arbitration Act (Northern Ireland) 1937	1 Edw. 8 & 1 Geo. 6. c. 8 (N.I.)	7 July 1937
Law Reform (Miscellaneous Provisions) Act (Northern Ireland) 1937	1 Edw. 8 & 1 Geo. 6. c. 9 (N.I.)	7 July 1937
An Act to establish a real representative; to amend the law relating to the capacity, property and liabilities of married women, and the liabilities of husbands; to amend the law as to the effect of death in relation to causes of action; and to amend the law relating to proceedings against, and contribution between, tort-feasors, and as to the awarding of interest in civil proceedings; and for purposes connected with the matters aforesaid.
Advertisements Regulation Act (Northern Ireland) 1937 (repealed)	1 Edw. 8 & 1 Geo. 6. c. 10 (N.I.)	7 July 1937
(Repealed by Planning (Northern Ireland) Order 1972 (SI 1972/1634)
New Industries (Development) Act (Northern Ireland) 1937	1 Edw. 8 & 1 Geo. 6. c. 11 (N.I.)	7 July 1937
Unemployment Assistance (Finance) Act (Northern Ireland) 1937	1 Edw. 8 & 1 Geo. 6. c. 12 (N.I.)	7 July 1937
Appropriation Act (Northern Ireland) 1937	1 Edw. 8 & 1 Geo. 6. c. 13 (N.I.)	7 July 1937
Roads Act (Northern Ireland) 1937	1 Edw. 8 & 1 Geo. 6. c. 14 (N.I.)	7 July 1937
County Court Judges' (Salaries) Act (Northern Ireland) 1937	1 Edw. 8 & 1 Geo. 6. c. 15 (N.I.)	9 November 1937
Expiring Laws Continuance Act (Northern Ireland) 1937	1 Edw. 8 & 1 Geo. 6. c. 16 (N.I.)	9 November 1937
Finance (No. 2) Act (Northern Ireland) 1937	1 Edw. 8 & 1 Geo. 6. c. 17 (N.I.)	9 November 1937
Exchequer and Financial Provisions Act (Northern Ireland) 1937	1 Edw. 8 & 1 Geo. 6. c. 18 (N.I.)	9 November 1937
Labourers' Cottages (Loans) Act (Northern Ireland) 1937	1 Edw. 8 & 1 Geo. 6. c. 19 (N.I.)	9 November 1937
Poor Relief (Amendment) Act (Northern Ireland) 1937	1 Edw. 8 & 1 Geo. 6. c. 20 (N.I.)	9 November 1937
Marketing of Eggs Act (Northern Ireland) 1937	1 Edw. 8 & 1 Geo. 6. c. 21 (N.I.)	9 November 1937
Milk and Milk Products Act (Northern Ireland) 1937	1 Edw. 8 & 1 Geo. 6. c. 22 (N.I.)	9 November 1937
Widows', Orphans' and Old Age Contributory Pensions (Voluntary Contributors) Act (Northern Ireland) 1937	1 Edw. 8 & 1 Geo. 6. c. 23 (N.I.)	9 November 1937
Finance Act (Northern Ireland) 1937	1 Edw. 8 & 1 Geo. 6. c. 24 (N.I.)	9 November 1937
National Health Insurance (Juvenile Contributors and Young Persons) Act (Northern Ireland) 1937	1 & 2 Geo. 6. c. 1 (N.I.)	17 December 1937
New Industries (Development) (No. 2) Act (Northern Ireland) 1937	1 & 2 Geo. 6. c. 2 (N.I.)	17 December 1937
Consolidated Fund (No. 2) Act (Northern Ireland) 1937	1 & 2 Geo. 6. c. 3 (N.I.)	17 December 1937
Road and Railway Transport Act (Northern Ireland) 1937	1 & 2 Geo. 6. c. 4 (N.I.)	17 December 1937
An Act to extend the powers of the Northern Ireland Road Transport Board as to the application of money borrowed under section twenty of the Road and Railway Transport Act (Northern Ireland), 1935.

==== Local acts ====
Short title, or popular name	Citation	Royal assent
Long title
Bangor Borough Council (Financial Provision) Act (Northern Ireland) 1937	1 Edw. 8 & 1 Geo. 6. c. i	7 July 1937
An Act to confer powers upon the Council of the Borough of Bangor to raise money for the discharge of past liabilities by means of a Special Rate, and to authorize the maintenance of an overdraft pending the discharge of such liabilities, and for other purposes.

==== Private acts ====
Short title, or popular name	Citation	Royal assent
Long title
Adair's Divorce Act (Northern Ireland) 1937	1 Edw. 8 & 1 Geo. 6. c. 1 Pr. (N.I.)	24 March 1937
Armstrong's Divorce Act (Northern Ireland) 1937	1 Edw. 8 & 1 Geo. 6. c. 2 Pr. (N.I.)	6 May 1937
Collis's Divorce Act (Northern Ireland) 1937	1 Edw. 8 & 1 Geo. 6. c. 3 Pr. (N.I.)	6 May 1937
Scott's Divorce Act (Northern Ireland) 1937	1 Edw. 8 & 1 Geo. 6. c. 4 Pr. (N.I.)	6 May 1937
Gray's Divorce Divorce Act (Northern Ireland) 1937	1 Edw. 8 & 1 Geo. 6. c. 5 Pr. (N.I.)	7 July 1937
Huddleston's Divorce Act (Northern Ireland) 1937	1 Edw. 8 & 1 Geo. 6. c. 6 Pr. (N.I.)	9 November 1937
Love's Divorce Act (Northern Ireland) 1937	1 Edw. 8 & 1 Geo. 6. c. 7 Pr. (N.I.)	9 November 1937
McMeekin's Divorce Act (Northern Ireland) 1937	1 Edw. 8 & 1 Geo. 6. c. 8 Pr. (N.I.)	9 November 1937
Gilfillan's Divorce Act (Northern Ireland) 1937	1 & 2 Geo. 6. c. 1 Pr. (N.I.)	17 December 1937
McGeagh's Divorce Act (Northern Ireland) 1937	1 & 2 Geo. 6. c. 2 Pr. (N.I.)	17 December 1937

=== 1938 ===
==== Public acts ====
Short title, or popular name	Citation	Royal assent
Long title
Consolidated Fund Act (Northern Ireland) 1938	2 Geo. 6. c. 1 (N.I.)	29 March 1938
An Act to apply a sum out of the Consolidated Fund of Northern Ireland to the service of the year ending on the thirty-first day of March, nineteen hundred and thirty-nine.
Unemployment Insurance Act (Northern Ireland) 1938 (repealed)	2 Geo. 6. c. 2 (N.I.)	31 March 1938
(Repealed by Education and Libraries (Northern Ireland) Order 1972 (SI 1972/1263)
Exported Animals (Compensation) Act (Northern Ireland) 1938	2 Geo. 6. c. 3 (N.I.)	10 May 1938
Hydrogen Cyanide (Fumigation) Act (Northern Ireland) 1938 (repealed)	2 Geo. 6. c. 4 (N.I.)	10 May 1938
An Act to regulate the fumigation with hydrogen cyanide of premises and articles. (Repealed by Health and Safety at Work (Northern Ireland) Order 1978 (SI 1978/1039))
Loans Guarantee Act (Northern Ireland) 1938	2 Geo. 6. c. 5 (N.I.)	10 May 1938
Exceptional Distress (Transitional Provisions) Act (Northern Ireland) 1938	2 Geo. 6. c. 6 (N.I.)	10 May 1938
An Act to make temporary provision for the relief of exceptional distress and for purposes connected therewith.
Criminal Lunatics Act (Northern Ireland) 1938	2 Geo. 6. c. 7 (N.I.)	15 June 1938
Blind Persons Act (Northern Ireland) 1938	2 Geo. 6. c. 8 (N.I.)	15 June 1938
National Health Insurance (Amendment) Act (Northern Ireland) 1938	2 Geo. 6. c. 9 (N.I.)	15 June 1938
Superannuation (Teaching Services) Act (Northern Ireland) 1938	2 Geo. 6. c. 10 (N.I.)	15 June 1938
Weights and Measures Act (Northern Ireland) 1938	2 Geo. 6. c. 11 (N.I.)	15 June 1938
Physical Training and Recreation Act (Northern Ireland) 1938	2 Geo. 6. c. 12 (N.I.)	15 June 1938
Appropriation Act (Northern Ireland) 1938	2 Geo. 6. c. 13 (N.I.)	15 June 1938
Solicitors Act (Northern Ireland) 1938	2 Geo. 6. c. 14 (N.I.)	15 June 1938
Milk and Milk Products Act (Northern Ireland) 1938	2 Geo. 6. c. 15 (N.I.)	15 June 1938
Finance Act (Northern Ireland) 1938	2 Geo. 6. c. 16 (N.I.)	24 November 1938
Expiring Laws Act (Northern Ireland) 1938	2 Geo. 6. c. 17 (N.I.)	24 November 1938
University and Collegiate and Scientific Institutions Act (Northern Ireland) 1938	2 Geo. 6. c. 18 (N.I.)	24 November 1938
National Health Insurance (Amendment) (No. 2) Act (Northern Ireland) 1938	2 Geo. 6. c. 19 (N.I.)	24 November 1938
Education Act (Northern Ireland) 1938 (repealed)	2 Geo. 6. c. 20 (N.I.)	24 November 1938
(Repealed by Education Act (Northern Ireland) 1947 (c. 3 (N.I.))
Queen's University of Belfast Act (Northern Ireland) 1938	2 Geo. 6. c. 21 (N.I.)	24 November 1938
An Act to amend the law relating to the Queen's University of Belfast and for purposes connected therewith.
Appropriation (No. 2) Act (Northern Ireland) 1938	2 Geo. 6. c. 22 (N.I.)	24 November 1938
Factories Act (Northern Ireland) 1938	2 Geo. 6. c. 23 (N.I.)	24 November 1938
Holidays with Pay Act (Northern Ireland) 1938	2 Geo. 6. c. 24 (N.I.)	24 November 1938
Marketing of Potatoes Act (Northern Ireland) 1938	2 Geo. 6. c. 25 (N.I.)	24 November 1938
Air-Raid Precautions Act (Northern Ireland) 1938 (repealed)	2 Geo. 6. c. 26 (N.I.)	24 November 1938
An Act to make provision for the taking of precautions against air-raids. (Repealed by Civil Contingencies Act 2004 (c. 36))
Road Transport Act (Northern Ireland) 1938	2 & 3 Geo. 6. c. 1 (N.I.)	23 December 1938
An Act to provide for the establishment of a register of vehicles licensed for the transport of goods on roads, and to amend certain provisions of the Road and Railway Transport Act (Northern Ireland), 1935.

==== Local acts ====
Short title, or popular name	Citation	Royal assent
Long title
Trade Boards Provisional Orders Confirmation Act (Northern Ireland) 1938	2 Geo. 6. c. i (N.I.)	15 June 1938
An Act to confirm two Provisional Orders in pursuance of Section nine of the Trade Boards Act (Northern Ireland) 1923, (Note: Trade Boards Act (Northern Ireland) 1923 (13 & 14 Geo. 5. c. 32 (N.I.))) relating respectively to the trades of road transport and to the road transport of milk and cream.
River Bann Navigation Act (Northern Ireland) 1938	2 Geo. 6. c. ii (N.I.)	15 June 1938
Belfast Water Act (Northern Ireland) 1938	2 Geo. 6. c. iii (N.I.)	15 June 1938
An Act to increase the amount of money which the Belfast City and District Water Commissioners may borrow; to provide for the use of the money so borrowed for the purpose of making a new main and for the purchase of a new engine and for certain other purposes; to make further provision as to the superannuation of officers; and to extend the powers of the Commissioners as to superannuation and as to the compensation to be paid on the retirement of their officers.
Belfast Harbour Act (Northern Ireland) 1938	2 Geo. 6. c. iv (N.I.)	15 June 1938
An Act to extend the borrowing powers of the Belfast Harbour Commissioners and for other purposes.
Belfast Hospital for Sick Children (Incorporated) Act (Northern Ireland) 1938	2 Geo. 6. c. v (N.I.)	15 June 1938

==== Private acts ====
Short title, or popular name	Citation	Royal assent
Long title
McAllen's Divorce Act (Northern Ireland) 1938	2 Geo. 6. c. 1 Pr. (N.I.)	10 May 1938
Quin's Divorce Act (Northern Ireland) 1938	2 Geo. 6. c. 2 Pr. (N.I.)	15 June 1938
McClure's Divorce Act (Northern Ireland) 1938	2 Geo. 6. c. 2 Pr. (N.I.)	15 June 1938
Henderson's Divorce Act (Northern Ireland) 1938	2 Geo. 6. c. 4 Pr. (N.I.)	24 November 1938
Mark's Divorce Act (Northern Ireland) 1938	2 Geo. 6. c. 5 Pr. (N.I.)	24 November 1938
McMullan's Divorce Act (Northern Ireland) 1938	2 Geo. 6. c. 6 Pr. (N.I.)	24 November 1938

=== 1939 ===
==== Public acts ====
Short title, or popular name	Citation	Royal assent
Long title
	2 & 3 Geo. 6. c. 1 (N.I.)	23 March 1939
Exchequer and Financial Provisions Act (Northern Ireland) 1939	2 & 3 Geo. 6. c. 2 (N.I.)	23 March 1939
An Act to extend the limit upon the amount of money which may be issued for Government Loans and to amend the enactments relating to the Government Loans Fund; to make further provision as to the amount of the charge on the Consolidated Fund for the purposes of the Irish Sailors and Soldiers Land Trust and the amount of a charge on the said Fund for capital expenditure; and to empower the Ministry of Finance to borrow money for certain issues from the Consolidated Fund.
Hairdressers Act (Northern Ireland) 1939	2 & 3 Geo. 6. c. 3 (N.I.)	29 March 1939
An Act to provide for the registration of premises in which the trade or business of barber or hairdresser is carried on, and to enable local authorities to make byelaws in respect of such premises, and for other purposes connected therewith.
Consolidated Fund Act (Northern Ireland) 1939	2 & 3 Geo. 6. c. 4 (N.I.)	29 March 1939
Infanticide Act (Northern Ireland) 1939	2 & 3 Geo. 6. c. 5 (N.I.)	2 May 1939
An Act to repeal and re-enact with modifications the provisions of the Infanticide Act, 1922, (Note: Infanticide Act 1922 (12 & 13 Geo. 5. c. 18)) as applied to Northern Ireland by the Uniformity of Laws Act (Northern Ireland), 1922. (Note: Uniformity of Laws Act (Northern Ireland) 1922 (12 & 13 Geo. 5. c. 20 (N.I.)))
Local Officers Superannuation Act (Northern Ireland) 1939	2 & 3 Geo. 6. c. 6 (N.I.)	27 June 1939
Appropriation Act (Northern Ireland) 1939	2 & 3 Geo. 6. c. 7 (N.I.)	27 June 1939
Finance Act (Northern Ireland) 1939	2 & 3 Geo. 6. c. 8 (N.I.)	27 June 1939
Education (School-leaving Age) Act (Northern Ireland) 1939	2 & 3 Geo. 6. c. 9 (N.I.)	27 June 1939
Bacon Industry Act (Northern Ireland) 1939	2 & 3 Geo. 6. c. 10 (N.I.)	4 July 1939
Housing Act (Northern Ireland) 1939	2 & 3 Geo. 6. c. 11 (N.I.)	4 July 1939
Evidence Act (Northern Ireland) 1939	2 & 3 Geo. 6. c. 12 (N.I.)	4 July 1939
An Act to amend the law of evidence.
Matrimonial Causes Act (Northern Ireland) 1939	3 & 4 Geo. 6. c. 13 (N.I.)	4 July 1939
An Act to confer jurisdiction upon the High Court to decree the dissolution of marriages in certain cases; to amend the law relating to matrimonial causes and matters; and for other purposes connected with the matters aforesaid.
Margarine Act (Northern Ireland) 1939	3 & 4 Geo. 6. c. 14 (N.I.)	4 July 1939
Civil Defence Act (Northern Ireland) 1939 (repealed)	3 & 4 Geo. 6. c. 15 (N.I.)	7 September 1939
(Repealed by Civil Contingencies Act 2004 (c. 36))
Exchequer and Financial Provisions (No. 2) Act (Northern Ireland) 1939	3 & 4 Geo. 6. c. 16 (N.I.)	7 September 1939
Agriculture (Emergency Provisions) Act (Northern Ireland) 1939	3 & 4 Geo. 6. c. 17 (N.I.)	20 September 1939
Expiring Laws Continuance Act (Northern Ireland) 1939	3 & 4 Geo. 6. c. 18 (N.I.)	28 September 1939
Unemployment Assistance (Emergency Powers) Act (Northern Ireland) 1939	3 & 4 Geo. 6. c. 19 (N.I.)	28 September 1939
Unemployment Insurance (Emergency Powers) Act (Northern Ireland) 1939	3 & 4 Geo. 6. c. 20 (N.I.)	28 September 1939
Education (Evacuated Children) Act (Northern Ireland) 1939 (repealed)	3 & 4 Geo. 6. c. 21 (N.I.)	28 September 1939
(Repealed by Education (Amendment) Act (Northern Ireland) 1951 (c. 10 (N.I.)))
Housing (Additional Powers) Act (Northern Ireland) 1939	3 & 4 Geo. 6. c. 22 (N.I.)	28 September 1939
Finance (Entertainments Duty) Act (Northern Ireland) 1939	3 & 4 Geo. 6. c. 23 (N.I.)	6 December 1939
Government Loans Act (Northern Ireland) 1939	3 & 4 Geo. 6. c. 24 (N.I.)	6 December 1939
Agricultural Wages (Regulation) Act (Northern Ireland) 1939	3 & 4 Geo. 6. c. 25 (N.I.)	6 December 1939
Finance (No. 2) Act (Northern Ireland) 1939	3 & 4 Geo. 6. c. 26 (N.I.)	6 December 1939
Local Government Staffs (War Service) Act (Northern Ireland) 1939	3 & 4 Geo. 6. c. 27 (N.I.)	6 December 1939
An Act to make provision with respect to the war service of persons employed by local authorities and for purposes connected therewith.
Unemployment Insurance Act (Northern Ireland) 1939 (repealed)	3 & 4 Geo. 6. c. 28 (N.I.)	6 December 1939
(Repealed by Education and Libraries (Northern Ireland) Order 1972 (SI 1972/1263)
National Health Insurance and Contributory Pensions (Emergency Provisions) Act (Northern Ireland) 1939	3 & 4 Geo. 6. c. 29 (N.I.)	6 December 1939
Appropriation (No. 2) Act (Northern Ireland) 1939	3 & 4 Geo. 6. c. 30 (N.I.)	6 December 1939
Control of Employment Act (Northern Ireland) 1939	3 & 4 Geo. 6. c. 31 (N.I.)	6 December 1939
Housing (Emergency Powers) Act (Northern Ireland) 1939	3 & 4 Geo. 6. c. 32 (N.I.)	6 December 1939
Teachers' Salaries and Superannuation (War Service) Act (Northern Ireland) 1939 (repealed)	3 & 4 Geo. 6. c. 33 (N.I.)	6 December 1939
(Repealed by Education (Amendment) Act (Northern Ireland) 1951 (c. 10 (N.I.)))
Essential Buildings and Plant (Repair of War Damage) Act (Northern Ireland) 1939	3 & 4 Geo. 6. c. 34 (N.I.)	6 December 1939
Agricultural Returns Act (Northern Ireland) 1939	3 & 4 Geo. 6. c. 35 (N.I.)	6 December 1939
Liability for War Damage (Miscellaneous Provisions) Act (Northern Ireland) 1939	3 & 4 Geo. 6. c. 36 (N.I.)	6 December 1939
An Act to modify certain rights and liabilities with respect to goods lost or damaged by war.
Execution of Trusts (Emergency Provisions) Act (Northern Ireland) 1939	3 & 4 Geo. 6. c. 37 (N.I.)	6 December 1939
Gas Undertakings Act (Northern Ireland) 1939	3 & 4 Geo. 6. c. 38 (N.I.)	6 December 1939
Trade Boards Act (Northern Ireland) 1939	3 & 4 Geo. 6. c. 39 (N.I.)	6 December 1939

==== Local acts ====
Short title, or popular name	Citation	Royal assent
Long title
Upper Bann Navigation Provisional Order Confirmation Act (Northern Ireland) 1939	3 & 4 Geo. 6. c. i (N.I.)	6 December 1939
An Act to confirm a Provisional Order relating to the Upper Bann Navigation.

==== Private acts ====
Short title, or popular name	Citation	Royal assent
Long title
McGugan's Divorce Act (Northern Ireland) 1939	3 & 4 Geo. 6. c. 1 Pr. (N.I.)	29 March 1939
Plumb's Divorce Act (Northern Ireland) 1939	3 & 4 Geo. 6. c. 2 Pr. (N.I.)	29 March 1939
Clarke's Divorce Act (Northern Ireland) 1939	3 & 4 Geo. 6. c. 3 Pr. (N.I.)	29 March 1939
Stuart's Divorce Act (Northern Ireland) 1939	3 & 4 Geo. 6. c. 4 Pr. (N.I.)	27 June 1939

== 1940–1949 ==
=== 1940 ===
==== Public acts ====
Short title, or popular name	Citation	Royal assent
Long title
Chartered and Other Bodies (Temporary Provisions) Act (Northern Ireland) 1940	4 & 5 Geo. 6. c. 1 (N.I.)	21 March 1940
Local Authorities and Jurors Books (Temporary Provisions) Act (Northern Ireland) 1940	4 & 5 Geo. 6. c. 2 (N.I.)	21 March 1940
Consolidated Fund Act (Northern Ireland) 1940	4 & 5 Geo. 6. c. 3 (N.I.)	21 March 1940
Local Government (Finance) Act (Northern Ireland) 1940	4 & 5 Geo. 6. c. 4 (N.I.)	21 March 1940
Education (School-leaving Age) Act (Northern Ireland) 1940 (repealed)	4 & 5 Geo. 6. c. 5 (N.I.)	30 April 1940
(Repealed by Education Act (Northern Ireland) 1947 (c. 3 (N.I.))
Old Age and Widows' Pensions Act (Northern Ireland) 1940	4 & 5 Geo. 6. c. 6 (N.I.)	30 April 1940
Rent and Mortgage Interest (Restrictions) Act (Northern Ireland) 1940	4 & 5 Geo. 6. c. 7 (N.I.)	30 April 1940
Building Societies Act (Northern Ireland) 1940	4 & 5 Geo. 6. c. 8 (N.I.)	30 April 1940
Prevention of Frauds (Investments) Act (Northern Ireland) 1940	4 & 5 Geo. 6. c. 9 (N.I.)	21 May 1940
Hire-Purchase Act (Northern Ireland) 1940	4 & 5 Geo. 6. c. 10 (N.I.)	21 May 1940
Ministries Act (Northern Ireland) 1940 (repealed)	4 & 5 Geo. 6. c. 11 (N.I.)	25 June 1940
(Repealed by Northern Ireland (Emergency Provisions) Act 1973 (c. 53)
Valuation Acts Amendment Act (Northern Ireland) 1940 (repealed)	4 & 5 Geo. 6. c. 12 (N.I.)	11 July 1940
(Repealed by Rates (Northern Ireland) Order 1972 (SI 1972/1633)
Appropriation Act (Northern Ireland) 1940	4 & 5 Geo. 6. c. 13 (N.I.)	11 July 1940
Exchequer and Financial Provision Act (Northern Ireland) 1940	4 & 5 Geo. 6. c. 14 (N.I.)	11 July 1940
Industrial Assurance and Friendly Societies (Emergency Protection from Forfeiture) Act (Northern Ireland) 1940	4 & 5 Geo. 6. c. 15 (N.I.)	11 July 1940
Unemployment Insurance Act (Northern Ireland) 1940	4 & 5 Geo. 6. c. 16 (N.I.)	30 July 1940
Appropriation (No. 2) Act (Northern Ireland) 1940	4 & 5 Geo. 6. c. 17 (N.I.)	15 August 1940
Workmens' Compensation (Supplementary Allowance) Act (Northern Ireland) 1940	4 & 5 Geo. 6. c. 18 (N.I.)	15 August 1940
Agricultural Wages (Regulation) Act (Northern Ireland) 1940	4 & 5 Geo. 6. c. 19 (N.I.)	1 October 1940
Finance Act (Northern Ireland) 1940	4 & 5 Geo. 6. c. 20 (N.I.)	8 October 1940
Truck Act (Northern Ireland) 1940 (repealed)	4 & 5 Geo. 6. c. 21 (N.I.)	8 October 1940
(Repealed by Wages (Northern Ireland) Order 1988 (SI 1988/796))
Finance (No. 2) Act (Northern Ireland) 1940	4 & 5 Geo. 6. c. 22 (N.I.)	8 October 1940
Local Government Inquiries Act (Northern Ireland) 1940	4 & 5 Geo. 6. c. 23 (N.I.)	22 October 1940
Expiring Laws Continuance Act (Northern Ireland) 1940	4 & 5 Geo. 6. c. 24 (N.I.)	5 November 1940
Societies (Miscellaneous Provisions) Act (Northern Ireland) 1940	4 & 5 Geo. 6. c. 25 (N.I.)	5 November 1940
Craigavon (Burial) Act (Northern Ireland) 1940	4 & 5 Geo. 6. c. 26 (N.I.)	26 November 1940
An Act to make provision as to the burial of persons in the Craigavon area.
Education (Emergency Provisions) Act (Northern Ireland) 1940 (repealed)	4 & 5 Geo. 6. c. 27 (N.I.)	11 December 1940
(Repealed by Education and Libraries (Northern Ireland) Order 1972 (SI 1972/1263)
Appropriation (No. 3) Act (Northern Ireland) 1940	4 & 5 Geo. 6. c. 28 (N.I.)	11 December 1940

==== Local acts ====
Short title, or popular name	Citation	Royal assent
Long title
Belfast Presbyterian College Act (Northern Ireland) 1940	4 & 5 Geo. 6. c. i (N.I.)	21 May 1940
An Act to provide for the government, constitution and management of the Presbyterian College, Belfast, and for other purposes connected therewith.

=== 1941 ===
Short title, or popular name	Citation	Royal assent
Long title
Salaries of Ministerial Offices Act (Northern Ireland) 1941	4 & 5 Geo. 6. c. 29 (N.I.)	16 January 1941
Salaries of Ministerial Offices (No. 2) Act (Northern Ireland) 1941	5 & 6 Geo. 6. c. 1 (N.I.)	27 March 1941
Exchequer and Financial Provisions Act (Northern Ireland) 1941	5 & 6 Geo. 6. c. 2 (N.I.)	27 March 1941
Consolidated Fund Act (Northern Ireland) 1941	5 & 6 Geo. 6. c. 3 (N.I.)	27 March 1941
Determination of Needs Act (Northern Ireland) 1941	5 & 6 Geo. 6. c. 4 (N.I.)	8 April 1941
Superannuation (Teaching Services) Act (Northern Ireland) 1941	5 & 6 Geo. 6. c. 5 (N.I.)	1 July 1941
Superannuation Schemes (War Service) Act (Northern Ireland) 1941	5 & 6 Geo. 6. c. 6 (N.I.)	1 July 1941
An Act to enable provision to be made for preventing loss of benefits under certain superannuation schemes by persons undertaking service in the forces or employment for war purposes.
Fisheries (Flax Water) Act (Northern Ireland) 1941	5 & 6 Geo. 6. c. 7 (N.I.)	31 July 1941
Appropriation Act (Northern Ireland) 1941	5 & 6 Geo. 6. c. 8 (N.I.)	31 July 1941
Landlord and Tenant (War Damage) Act (Northern Ireland) 1941	5 & 6 Geo. 6. c. 9 (N.I.)	14 October 1941
An Act to modify the rights and liabilities of landlords, tenants and other persons interested in land damaged by war.
Road Transport Act (Northern Ireland) 1941	5 & 6 Geo. 6. c. 10 (N.I.)	21 October 1941
An Act to secure the observance of the requirements of section sixteen of the Road and Railway Transport Act (Northern Ireland), 1935, relating to the wages and conditions of employment of persons employed by local carriers.
Finance Act (Northern Ireland) 1941	5 & 6 Geo. 6. c. 11 (N.I.)	4 November 1941
Repair of War Damage Act (Northern Ireland) 1941	5 & 6 Geo. 6. c. 12 (N.I.)	4 November 1941
Act to make provision for the repair of war damage and for the payment of grants in respect thereof, and for purposes connected therewith.
Clogher Valley Railway and Roads Act (Northern Ireland) 1941 (repealed)	5 & 6 Geo. 6. c. 13 (N.I.)	4 November 1941
An Act to provide for the discontinuance and winding up of the Clogher Valley Railway undertaking and the restoration of public roads affected by the said undertaking, and for purposes connected with the matters aforesaid. (Repealed by Statute Law Revision (Northern Ireland) Act 1980 (c. 59)
National Health Insurance and Contributory Pensions Act (Northern Ireland) 1941	5 & 6 Geo. 6. c. 14 (N.I.)	11 November 1941
Chartered and Other Bodies (Temporary Provisions) Act (Northern Ireland) 1941	5 & 6 Geo. 6. c. 15 (N.I.)	25 November 1941
Workmen's Compensation (Amendment) Act (Northern Ireland) 1941	5 & 6 Geo. 6. c. 16 (N.I.)	25 November 1941
Ministries Act (Northern Ireland) 1941	5 & 6 Geo. 6. c. 17 (N.I.)	25 November 1941
Expiring Laws Continuance Act (Northern Ireland) 1941	5 & 6 Geo. 6. c. 18 (N.I.)	30 December 2025
Liabilities (War-Time Adjustment) Act (Northern Ireland) 1941	5 & 6 Geo. 6. c. 19 (N.I.)	30 December 2025
Excessive Rents (Prevention) Act (Northern Ireland) 1941 (repealed)	5 & 6 Geo. 6. c. 20 (N.I.)	30 December 2025
(Repealed by Statute Law Revision (Northern Ireland) Act 1973 (c. 55))
Appropriation (No. 2) Act (Northern Ireland) 1941	5 & 6 Geo. 6. c. 21 (N.I.)	30 December 2025
Exported Animals (Compensation) Act (Northern Ireland) 1941	5 & 6 Geo. 6. c. 22 (N.I.)	30 December 2025
Air-Raid Precautions (Postponement of Financial Investigation) Act (Northern Ireland) 1941	5 & 6 Geo. 6. c. 23 (N.I.)	30 December 2025
An Act to postpone the investigations and reports which, under subsection (3) of section ten of the Air-Raid Precautions Act (Northern Ireland), 1938, (Note: Air-Raid Precautions Act (Northern Ireland) 1938 (2 Geo. 6. c. 26 (N.I.))) are to be made by the Ministry of Home Affairs and by the Ministry of Finance.

=== 1942 ===
Short title, or popular name	Citation	Royal assent
Long title
Exchequer and Financial Provisions Act (Northern Ireland) 1942	6 & 7 Geo. 6. c. 1 (N.I.)	31 March 1942
Consolidated Fund Act (Northern Ireland) 1942	6 & 7 Geo. 6. c. 2 (N.I.)	31 March 1942
Education (Emergency Provisions) Act (Northern Ireland) 1942 (repealed)	6 & 7 Geo. 6. c. 3 (N.I.)	31 March 1942
(Repealed by Education (Amendment) Act (Northern Ireland) 1951 (c. 10 (N.I.)))
Housing (Temporary Accommodation) Act (Northern Ireland) 1942 (repealed)	6 & 7 Geo. 6. c. 4 (N.I.)	31 March 1942
(Repealed by Statute Law Revision (Northern Ireland) Act 1973 (c. 55))
Fire Services (Emergency Provisions) Act (Northern Ireland) 1942	6 & 7 Geo. 6. c. 5 (N.I.)	31 March 1942
Unemployment Assistance (Finance) Act (Northern Ireland) 1942	6 & 7 Geo. 6. c. 6 (N.I.)	30 June 1942
Drainage Act (Northern Ireland) 1942 (repealed)	6 & 7 Geo. 6. c. 7 (N.I.)	30 June 1942
(Repealed by Drainage (Northern Ireland) Order 1973 (SI 1973/69)
Agricultural Wages (Flax Workers) Act (Northern Ireland) 1942	6 & 7 Geo. 6. c. 8 (N.I.)	30 June 1942
Sale of Ice-Cream (Temporary Provisions) Act (Northern Ireland) 1942	6 & 7 Geo. 6. c. 9 (N.I.)	27 August 1942
Electricity (Emergency Supplies) Act (Northern Ireland) 1942 (repealed)	6 & 7 Geo. 6. c. 10 (N.I.)	27 August 1942
(Repealed by Electricity Supply (Northern Ireland) Order 1972 (SI 1972/1072)
Belfast County Borough Administration Act (Northern Ireland) 1942	6 & 7 Geo. 6. c. 11 (N.I.)	27 August 1942
New Industries (Development) Act (Northern Ireland) 1942	6 & 7 Geo. 6. c. 12 (N.I.)	27 August 1942
Appropriation Act (Northern Ireland) 1942	6 & 7 Geo. 6. c. 13 (N.I.)	27 August 1942
Finance Act (Northern Ireland) 1942	6 & 7 Geo. 6. c. 14 (N.I.)	13 October 1942
County Court Jurisdiction Act (Northern Ireland) 1942	6 & 7 Geo. 6. c. 15 (N.I.)	24 November 1942
Children (Juvenile Courts) Act (Northern Ireland) 1942	6 & 7 Geo. 6. c. 16 (N.I.)	24 November 1942
Expiring Laws Continuance Act (Northern Ireland) 1942	6 & 7 Geo. 6. c. 17 (N.I.)	24 November 1942
Exchequer and Financial Provisions (No. 2) Act (Northern Ireland) 1942	6 & 7 Geo. 6. c. 18 (N.I.)	24 November 1942
Government Loans Act (Northern Ireland) 1942	6 & 7 Geo. 6. c. 19 (N.I.)	24 November 1942
Finance (No. 2) Act (Northern Ireland) 1942	6 & 7 Geo. 6. c. 20 (N.I.)	24 November 1942
Appropriation (No. 2) Act (Northern Ireland) 1942	6 & 7 Geo. 6. c. 21 (N.I.)	24 November 1942
Fisheries Act (Northern Ireland) 1942	6 & 7 Geo. 6. c. 22 (N.I.)	15 December 1942
Scutch Mills and Flax (Fire Insurance) Act (Northern Ireland) 1942	6 & 7 Geo. 6. c. 23 (N.I.)	30 December 1942
An Act to provide for the establishment of a fund for insuring against fire flax and tow at scutch mills and for purposes connected therewith.
Agriculture (Destruction of Vermin) Act (Northern Ireland) 1942	6 & 7 Geo. 6. c. 24 (N.I.)	30 December 1942

=== 1943 ===
==== Public acts ====
Short title, or popular name	Citation	Royal assent
Long title
Consolidated Fund Act (Northern Ireland) 1943	1943 c. 1 (N.I.)	25 March 1943
Civil Authorities (Special Powers) Act (Northern Ireland) 1943 (repealed)	1943 c. 2 (N.I.)	14 April 1943
(Repealed by Northern Ireland (Emergency Provisions) Act 1973 (c. 53)
Acts of Parliament (Citation and Effect) Act (Northern Ireland) 1943	1943 c. 3 (N.I.)	14 April 1943
An Act to make further provision with respect to the citation, commencement and continuance of Acts of the Parliament of Northern Ireland.
Solicitors Act (Northern Ireland) 1943	1943 c. 4 (N.I.)	6 July 1943
Finance Act (Northern Ireland) 1943	1943 c. 5 (N.I.)	6 July 1943
Workmen's Compensation Act (Northern Ireland) 1943	1943 c. 6 (N.I.)	6 July 1943
Appropriation Act (Northern Ireland) 1943	1943 c. 7 (N.I.)	6 July 1943
Pensions and Determination of Needs Act (Northern Ireland) 1943	1943 c. 8 (N.I.)	4 August 1943
Rent Restriction Law (Amendment) Act (Northern Ireland) 1943	1943 c. 9 (N.I.)	26 October 1943
Appropriation (No. 2) Act (Northern Ireland) 1943	1943 c. 10 (N.I.)	30 November 1943
Finance (No. 2) Act (Northern Ireland) 1943	1943 c. 11 (N.I.)	30 November 1943
Expiring Laws Continuance Act (Northern Ireland) 1943	1943 c. 12 (N.I.)	14 December 1943
Workmens' Compensation (Temporary Increases) Act (Northern Ireland) 1943	1943 c. 13 (N.I.)	14 December 1943

==== Local acts ====
Short title, or popular name	Citation	Royal assent
Long title
Belfast Corporation Act (Northern Ireland) 1943	1943 c. i (N.I.)	6 July 1943
An Act to confer powers on the Lord Mayor Aldermen and Citizens of the City of Belfast with respect to the superannuation of persons employed by them and for other purposes.

=== 1944 ===
Short title, or popular name	Citation	Royal assent
Long title
Youth Welfare Act (Northern Ireland) 1944	1944 c. 1 (N.I.)	25 January 1944
Exchequer and Financial Provisions Act (Northern Ireland) 1944	1944 c. 2 (N.I.)	25 January 1944
Planning (Interim Development) Act (Northern Ireland) 1944 (repealed)	1944 c. 3 (N.I.)	25 January 1944
(Repealed by Planning (Northern Ireland) Order 1972 (SI 1972/1634)
Milk Act (Northern Ireland) 1944	1944 c. 4 (N.I.)	25 January 1944
Accidental Fires Act (Northern Ireland) 1944	1944 c. 5 (N.I.)	21 March 1944
An Act to amend the law relating to restrictions on the taking of legal proceedings in respect of damage caused by accidental fires.
Rent Restriction (Defective Tenancies) Act (Northern Ireland) 1944	1944 c. 6 (N.I.)	21 March 1944
Marriage (Declaration of Law) Act (Northern Ireland) 1944	1944 c. 7 (N.I.)	21 March 1944
An Act to remove doubts as to the effect of certain enactments or rules of law in their relation to the solemnization of marriages of divorced persons and marriages to which the Marriage (Prohibited Degrees of Relationship) Acts (Northern Ireland) 1907 to 1924, apply.
Consolidated Fund Act (Northern Ireland) 1944	1944 c. 8 (N.I.)	28 March 1944
Constabulary Act (Northern Ireland) 1944	1944 c. 9 (N.I.)	4 April 1944
Housing Act (Northern Ireland) 1944	1944 c. 10 (N.I.)	4 April 1944
Clogher Valley Railway Company (Winding Up) Act (Northern Ireland) 1944	1944 c. 11 (N.I.)	6 April 1944
An Act to provide for the winding up of the Clogher Valley Railway Company Limited, and for extinguishing the share capital of that company; and for purposes connected with the matters aforesaid.
Superannuation (Teaching Services) Act (Northern Ireland) 1944	1944 c. 12 (N.I.)	9 May 1944
Housing (Requisitioning of Premises) Act (Northern Ireland) 1944 (repealed)	1944 c. 13 (N.I.)	9 May 1944
(Repealed by Statute Law Revision (Northern Ireland) Act 1973 (c. 55))
Ministries Act (Northern Ireland) 1944	1944 c. 14 (N.I.)	9 May 1944
An Act to establish a Ministry of Health and Local Government for Northern Ireland; to abolish the Ministry of Public Security for Northern Ireland; to make further provision with respect to the assignment and transfer of functions of Government departments; to provide for the salaries of certain Ministerial offices; and for purposes connected with the matters aforesaid.
Trade Boards Act (Northern Ireland) 1944	1944 c. 15 (N.I.)	6 June 1944
Appropriation Act (Northern Ireland) 1944	1944 c. 16 (N.I.)	10 August 1944
Local Government (Finance) Act (Northern Ireland) 1944	1944 c. 17 (N.I.)	10 August 1944
Planning Acts Amendment Act (Northern Ireland) 1944 (repealed)	1944 c. 18 (N.I.)	10 August 1944
(Repealed by Planning (Northern Ireland) Order 1972 (SI 1972/1634)
Pension's (Increase) Act (Northern Ireland) 1944	1944 c. 19 (N.I.)	10 August 1944
Expiring Laws Continuance Act (Northern Ireland) 1944	1944 c. 20 (N.I.)	31 October 1944
Unemployment Insurance (Increase of Benefit) Act (Northern Ireland) 1944	1944 c. 21 (N.I.)	31 October 1944
Finance Act (Northern Ireland) 1944	1944 c. 22 (N.I.)	21 November 1944
An Act to amend the law relating to death duties, stamp duty, entertainments duty and certain excise licences, and to make further provision in connection with finance.
Parliament (Elections and Meeting) Act (Northern Ireland) 1944	1944 c. 23 (N.I.)	14 December 1944
Register of Electors (Temporary Provisions) Act (Northern Ireland) 1944	1944 c. 24 (N.I.)	14 December 1944
Exchequer and Financial Provisions (No. 2) Act (Northern Ireland) 1944	1944 c. 25 (N.I.)	14 December 1944
Appropriation (No. 2) Act (Northern Ireland) 1944	1944 c. 26 (N.I.)	14 December 1944
New Industries (Development) Act (Northern Ireland) 1944	1944 c. 27 (N.I.)	14 December 1944

=== 1945 ===
Short title, or popular name	Citation	Royal assent
Long title
Bee Pest Prevention Act (Northern Ireland) 1945	1945 c. 1 (N.I.)	6 February 1945
Housing Act (Northern Ireland) 1945	1945 c. 2 (N.I.)	6 February 1945
Local Government (Finance) Act (Northern Ireland) 1945	1945 c. 3 (N.I.)	28 March 1945
Consolidated Fund Act (Northern Ireland) 1945	1945 c. 4 (N.I.)	28 March 1945
Representation of the People Act (Northern Ireland) 1945	1945 c. 5 (N.I.)	28 March 1945
Disabled Persons (Employment) Act (Northern Ireland) 1945	1945 c. 6 (N.I.)	1 May 1945
An Act to make further and better provision for enabling persons handicapped by disablement to secure employment, or work on their own account, and for purposes connected therewith.
Appropriation Act (Northern Ireland) 1945	1945 c. 7 (N.I.)	24 May 1945
Belfast County Borough Administration Act (Northern Ireland) 1945	1945 c. 8 (N.I.)	24 May 1945
An Act to restore functions to the Council of the County Borough of Belfast, and for purposes connected therewith.
Medicines, Pharmacy and Poisons Act (Northern Ireland) 1945	1945 c. 9 (N.I.)	24 May 1945
Appropriation (No. 2) Act (Northern Ireland) 1945	1945 c. 10 (N.I.)	29 August 1945
Government Loans Act (Northern Ireland) 1945	1945 c. 11 (N.I.)	29 August 1945
Industries Development Act (Northern Ireland) 1945	1945 c. 12 (N.I.)	29 August 1945
Expiring Laws Continuance Act (Northern Ireland) 1945	1945 c. 13 (N.I.)	29 November 1945
Summary Jurisdiction (Separation and Maintenance) Act (Northern Ireland) 1945	1945 c. 14 (N.I.)	29 November 1945
Criminal Justice Act (Northern Ireland) 1945	1945 c. 15 (N.I.)	13 December 1945
An Act to amend the law with respect to the administration of criminal justice and for certain purposes connected therewith.
Indictments Act (Northern Ireland) 1945	1945 c. 16 (N.I.)	13 December 1945
An Act to amend the law relating to indictments in criminal cases, and for purposes connected with the said matter.
Water Supplies and Sewerage Act (Northern Ireland) 1945	1945 c. 17 (N.I.)	13 December 1945
An Act to make better provision as to water supplies, sewerage and sewage disposal; and for other purposes connected with the matters aforesaid.
Motor Vehicles and Road Traffic (Amendment) Act (Northern Ireland) 1945	1945 c. 18 (N.I.)	13 December 1945
Family Allowances Act (Northern Ireland) 1945	1945 c. 19 (N.I.)	13 December 1945
Development Loans Act (Northern Ireland) 1945	1945 c. 20 (N.I.)	13 December 1945
Wages Councils Act (Northern Ireland) 1945	1945 c. 21 (N.I.)	13 December 1945
Appropriation (No. 3) Act (Northern Ireland) 1945	1945 c. 22 (N.I.)	13 December 1945
Local Authorities (Temporary Provisions) Act (Northern Ireland) 1945	1945 c. 23 (N.I.)	13 December 1945
Electricity (Supply) Act (Northern Ireland) 1945	1945 c. 24 (N.I.)	13 December 1945

=== 1946 ===
==== Public acts ====
Short title, or popular name	Citation	Royal assent
Long title
Finance Act (Northern Ireland) 1946	1946 c. 1 (N.I.)	19 February 1946
Fire Services (Emergency Provisions) (Amendment) Act (Northern Ireland) 1946	1946 c. 2 (N.I.)	19 February 1946
National Health Insurance and Contributory Pensions Act (Northern Ireland) 1946	1946 c. 3 (N.I.)	19 February 1946
Housing and Local Government (Miscellaneous Provisions) Act (Northern Ireland) 1946	1946 c. 4 (N.I.)	28 February 1946
An Act to provide for the giving of financial assistance in respect of the provision of housing accommodation for workers; to make provision for temporary housing accommodation; to make certain provisions in respect of the acquisition of land by local authorities; to make certain amendments in the law relating to housing and local government (including public health); and for purposes connected with the matters aforesaid or any of them.
Summary Jurisdiction (Miscellaneous Provisions) Act (Northern Ireland) 1946	1946 c. 5 (N.I.)	28 February 1946
Public Health (Tuberculosis) Act (Northern Ireland) 1946	1946 c. 6 (N.I.)	28 February 1946
Shops Act (Northern Ireland) 1946	1946 c. 7 (N.I.)	28 February 1946
Elections and Franchise Act (Northern Ireland) 1946	1946 c. 8 (N.I.)	28 February 1946
Consolidated Fund Act (Northern Ireland) 1946	1946 c. 9 (N.I.)	28 March 1946
Exchequer and Financial Provisions Act (Northern Ireland) 1946	1946 c. 10 (N.I.)	28 March 1946
Ministries Act (Northern Ireland) 1946	1946 c. 11 (N.I.)	28 March 1946
Valuation Acts Amendment Act (Northern Ireland) 1946 (repealed)	1946 c. 12 (N.I.)	28 March 1946
(Repealed by Rates (Northern Ireland) Order 1972 (SI 1972/1633)
Perjury Act (Northern Ireland) 1946	1946 c. 13 (N.I.)	4 July 1946
Appropriation Act (Northern Ireland) 1946	1946 c. 14 (N.I.)	16 July 1946
Nurses Act (Northern Ireland) 1946	1946 c. 15 (N.I.)	16 July 1946
Marriage and Matrimonial Causes Act (Northern Ireland) 1946 (repealed)	1946 c. 16 (N.I.)	29 August 1946
(Repealed by Marriage (Northern Ireland) Order 2003 (SI 2003/413)
Finance (No. 2) Act (Northern Ireland) 1946	1946 c. 17 (N.I.)	29 August 1946
Loans Guarantee and Borrowing Regulation Act (Northern Ireland) 1946	1946 c. 18 (N.I.)	29 August 1946
Public Health and Local Government (Administrative Provisions) Act (Northern Ireland) 1946	1946 c. 19 (N.I.)	29 August 1946
Housing (No. 2) Act (Northern Ireland) 1946	1946 c. 20 (N.I.)	29 August 1946
An Act to amend and repeal certain enactments relating to housing; to make further provision for the giving of financial assistance to persons providing housing accommodation and for the better execution by local authorities of their functions under the Housing Acts; and for purposes connected with the matters aforesaid.
National Insurance (Industrial Injuries) Act (Northern Ireland) 1946	1946 c. 21 (N.I.)	29 August 1946
Dog Races (Restriction) Act (Northern Ireland) 1946	1946 c. 22 (N.I.)	29 August 1946
National Insurance Act (Northern Ireland) 1946 (repealed)	1946 c. 23 (N.I.)	29 August 1946
(Repealed by Social Security Act 1973 (c. 38))
Teachers' Salaries (War Service) (Amendment) Act (Northern Ireland) 1946 (repealed)	1946 c. 24 (N.I.)	5 December 1946
(Repealed by Superannuation (Northern Ireland) Order 1972 (SI 1972/1073)
Appropriation (No. 2) Act (Northern Ireland) 1946	1946 c. 25 (N.I.)	19 December 1946
Expiring Laws Continuance Act (Northern Ireland) 1946	1946 c. 26 (N.I.)	19 December 1946
Local Government Elections (Validation) Act (Northern Ireland) 1946	1946 c. 27 (N.I.)	19 December 1946
Unemployment and Family Allowances (Agreement) Act (Northern Ireland) 1946	1946 c. 28 (N.I.)	19 December 1946

==== Local acts ====
Short title, or popular name	Citation	Royal assent
Long title
National Trust Act (Northern Ireland) 1946	1945 c. i (N.I.)	19 February 1946

=== 1947 ===
==== Public acts ====
Short title, or popular name	Citation	Royal assent
Long title
Assurance Companies Act (Northern Ireland) 1947	1947 c. 1 (N.I.)	21 January 1947
Frustrated Contracts Act (Northern Ireland) 1947	1947 c. 2 (N.I.)	6 March 1947
An Act to amend the law relating to the frustration of contracts.
Education Act (Northern Ireland) 1947 (repealed)	1947 c. 3 (N.I.)	27 March 1947
An Act to reform the law relating to education in Northern Ireland and for purposes connected with the said matter. (Repealed by Education and Libraries (Northern Ireland) Order 1972 (SI 1972/1263)
Pensions (Increase) Act (Northern Ireland) 1947	1947 c. 4 (N.I.)	27 March 1947
Exchequer and Financial Provisions Act (Northern Ireland) 1947	1947 c. 5 (N.I.)	27 March 1947
Appropriation Act (Northern Ireland) 1947	1947 c. 6 (N.I.)	27 March 1947
Electricity (Supply) Act (Northern Ireland) 1947	1947 c. 7 (N.I.)	31 March 1947
Small Dwellings Acquisition Act (Northern Ireland) 1947	1947 c. 8 (N.I.)	31 March 1947
Drainage Act (Northern Ireland) 1947 (repealed)	1947 c. 9 (N.I.)	31 March 1947
(Repealed by Drainage (Northern Ireland) Order 1973 (SI 1973/69)
Fire Services Act (Northern Ireland) 1947	1947 c. 10 (N.I.)	31 March 1947
Births and Deaths Registration Act (Northern Ireland) 1947	1947 c. 11 (N.I.)	10 July 1947
Fisheries (Flax Water) Act (Northern Ireland) 1947	1947 c. 12 (N.I.)	10 July 1947
Appropriation (No. 2) Act (Northern Ireland) 1947	1947 c. 13 (N.I.)	10 July 1947
Unemployment Assistance (Finance) (Amendment) Act (Northern Ireland) 1947	1947 c. 14 (N.I.)	10 July 1947
Finance Act (Northern Ireland) 1947	1947 c. 15 (N.I.)	10 July 1947
County Courts (Salaries and Rules) Act (Northern Ireland) 1947	1947 c. 16 (N.I.)	
Artificial Insemination of Animals Act (Northern Ireland) 1947	1947 c. 17 (N.I.)	25 November 1947
Superannuation Act (Northern Ireland) 1947	1947 c. 18 (N.I.)	2 December 1947
Youth Welfare, Physical Training and Recreation Act (Northern Ireland) 1947	1947 c. 19 (N.I.)	2 December 1947
Appropriation (No. 3) Act (Northern Ireland) 1947	1947 c. 20 (N.I.)	23 December 1947
Expiring Laws Continuance Act (Northern Ireland) 1947	1947 c. 21 (N.I.)	23 December 1947
Finance (No. 2) Act (Northern Ireland) 1947	1947 c. 22 (N.I.)	23 December 1947
Fire Services (Amendment) Act (Northern Ireland) 1947	1947 c. 23 (N.I.)	23 December 1947
Safeguarding of Employment Act (Northern Ireland) 1947	1947 c. 24 (N.I.)	23 December 1947

==== Local acts ====
Short title, or popular name	Citation	Royal assent
Long title
Ministry of Health and Local Government Provisional Order Confirmation (Larne Borough Extension)	1947 c. i (N.I.)	25 November 1947
Royal Victoria Hospital Act (Northern Ireland) 1947	1947 c. ii (N.I.)	2 December 1947
An Act to amend the Acts relating to the Royal Victoria Hospital, Belfast; and for other purposes.

=== 1948 ===
==== Public acts ====
Short title, or popular name	Citation	Royal assent
Long title
Diseases of Animals (Poultry) Act (Northern Ireland) 1948	1948 c. 1 (N.I.)	4 February 1948
Housing on Farms Act (Northern Ireland) 1948	1948 c. 2 (N.I.)	4 February 1948
Health Services Act (Northern Ireland) 1948	1948 c. 3 (N.I.)	4 February 1948
Development of Tourist Traffic Act (Northern Ireland) 1948	1948 c. 4 (N.I.)	4 February 1948
Consolidated Fund Act (Northern Ireland) 1948	1948 c. 5 (N.I.)	2 April 1948
Small Dwellings Acquisition Act (Northern Ireland) 1948	1948 c. 6 (N.I.)	2 April 1948
Elections and Franchise (Amendment) Act (Northern Ireland) 1948	1948 c. 7 (N.I.)	2 April 1948
Government Loans Act (Northern Ireland) 1948	1948 c. 8 (N.I.)	8 June 1948
Housing Act (Northern Ireland) 1948	1948 c. 9 (N.I.)	8 June 1948
Valuation Acts Amendment Act (Northern Ireland) 1948	1948 c. 10 (N.I.)	2 July 1948
Local Government (Finance) Act (Northern Ireland) 1948	1948 c. 11 (N.I.)	2 July 1948
Appropriation Act (Northern Ireland) 1948	1948 c. 12 (N.I.)	2 July 1948
National Assistance Act (Northern Ireland) 1948	1948 c. 13 (N.I.)	2 July 1948
Superannuation (Special Provisions) Act (Northern Ireland) 1948	1948 c. 14 (N.I.)	8 July 1948
Finance Act (Northern Ireland) 1948	1948 c. 15 (N.I.)	10 August 1948
An Act to alter certain duties of excise (including entertainments duty and duties on licences for mechanically-propelled vehicles) and stamp duties; to amend the law relating to the duties aforesaid and to death duties; to abolish certain duties; to provide for certain payments; and to make further provision in connection with finance.
Transport Act (Northern Ireland) 1948	1948 c. 16 (N.I.)	10 August 1948
An Act to provide for the establishment of the Ulster Transport Authority and for the transfer to that Authority of certain undertakings or parts of undertakings, property, rights, obligations and liabilities; to make provision with respect to railways and certain other transport undertakings, and otherwise to amend the law relating to transport; and for purposes connected with the matters aforesaid.
Mental Health Act (Northern Ireland) 1948 (repealed)	1948 c. 17 (N.I.)	10 August 1948
(Repealed by Mental Health (Northern Ireland) Order 1986 (SI 1986/595)
Electricity (Supply) Act (Northern Ireland) 1948 (repealed)	1948 c. 18 (N.I.)	10 August 1948
(Repealed by Electricity Supply (Northern Ireland) Order 1972 (SI 1972/1072)
Appropriation (No. 2) Act (Northern Ireland) 1948	1948 c. 19 (N.I.)	30 November 1948
National Insurance (Industrial Injuries) (Amendment) Act (Northern Ireland) 1948	1948 c. 20 (N.I.)	30 November 1948
Expiring Laws Continuance Act (Northern Ireland) 1948	1948 c. 21 (N.I.)	23 December 1948
Industrial Assurance and Friendly Societies Act (Northern Ireland) 1948	1948 c. 22 (N.I.)	23 December 1948
An Act to amend the Friendly Societies Acts (Northern Ireland), 1896 to 1929, and the Industrial Assurance Acts (Northern Ireland), 1924 to 1929, and to amend provisions corresponding or relating to provisions of those Acts contained in the Industrial and Provident Societies Acts (Northern Ireland), 1893 to 1929, and other enactments, as to payments on deaths of children, payments on deaths where no grant of probate or administration has been made, the designation of auditors appointed thereunder, the mode of determination of disputes and interpretation.
Law Reform (Miscellaneous Provisions) Act (Northern Ireland) 1948	1948 c. 23 (N.I.)	23 December 1948
An Act to abolish the defence of common employment; to amend the law relating to contributory negligence and the measure of damages for personal injury or death; and for purposes connected with the matters aforesaid.
Appropriation (No. 3) Act (Northern Ireland) 1948	1948 c. 24 (N.I.)	23 December 1948
Development Services Act (Northern Ireland) 1948	1948 c. 25 (N.I.)	23 December 1948
An Act to enable financial assistance to be given and other measures to be taken to provide for certain services, for bringing derelict land into use, and for the development of derelict areas generally; and for purposes connected with the matters aforesaid.
Industries Development (Amendment) Act (Northern Ireland) 1948	1948 c. 26 (N.I.)	23 December 1948
Solicitors Act (Northern Ireland) 1948	1948 c. 27 (N.I.)	23 December 1948
Roads Act (Northern Ireland) 1948	1948 c. 28 (N.I.)	23 December 1948
An Act to provide that the Ministry of Commerce shall be the road authority for such of the principal roads in Northern Ireland as may for the time being constitute the main system of routes for through traffic therein; to facilitate road traffic and prevent danger to persons using roads; to make certain amendments in the law relating to roads; and for purposes connected with the matters aforesaid.
Transport Tribunal (First Chairman) Act (Northern Ireland) 1948	1948 c. 29 (N.I.)	23 December 1948
An Act to appoint the first chairman of the Transport Tribunal for Northern Ireland and to make provision for payment of his salary and pension.

==== Local acts ====
Short title, or popular name	Citation	Royal assent
Long title
Belfast Corporation (General Powers) Act (Northern Ireland) 1948	1948 c. i (N.I.)	23 December 1948
An Act to confer upon the Lord Mayor, Alderman and Citizens of the City of Belfast additional powers and enact additional provisions with reference to their several undertakings and to matters relating to the health improvement good government and finances of the city; to make further provision with reference to the superannuation of officers and servants of the Corporation; and for other purposes.

=== 1949 ===
==== Public acts ====
Short title, or popular name	Citation	Royal assent
Long title
Welfare Services Act (Northern Ireland) 1949	1949 c. 1 (N.I.)	20 January 1949
Agriculture Act (Northern Ireland) 1949	1949 c. 2 (N.I.)	20 January 1949
An Act to make further provision for agriculture and for purposes connected therewith.
Social Services (Agreement) Act (Northern Ireland) 1949	1949 c. 3 (N.I.)	23 March 1949
Finance (Miscellaneous Provisions) Act (Northern Ireland) 1949	1949 c. 4 (N.I.)	23 March 1949
Consolidated Fund Act (Northern Ireland) 1949	1949 c. 5 (N.I.)	29 March 1949
Factories Act (Northern Ireland) 1949	1949 c. 6 (N.I.)	3 May 1949
Statistics of Trade Act (Northern Ireland) 1949	1949 c. 7 (N.I.)	7 June 1949
Ryegrass Seed (Temporary Provisions) Act (Northern Ireland) 1949	1949 c. 8 (N.I.)	28 June 1949
Constabulary (Pensions) Act (Northern Ireland) 1949	1949 c. 9 (N.I.)	28 June 1949
Government Loans Act (Northern Ireland) 1949	1949 c. 10 (N.I.)	28 June 1949
Appropriation Act (Northern Ireland) 1949	1949 c. 11 (N.I.)	28 July 1949
Exchequer and Financial Provisions Act (Northern Ireland) 1949	1949 c. 12 (N.I.)	28 July 1949
Superannuation Act (Northern Ireland) 1949	1949 c. 13 (N.I.)	11 August 1949
Marketing of Poultry Act (Northern Ireland) 1949	1949 c. 14 (N.I.)	11 August 1949
Finance Act (Northern Ireland) 1949	1949 c. 15 (N.I.)	11 August 1949
An Act to amend the law relating to death duties, stamp duties, entertainments duty and certain other duties of excise; to make provision with respect to certain excise licences and otherwise to amend the law relating to the public revenue and to make further provision in connection with finance.
Ulster Land Fund Act (Northern Ireland) 1949	1949 c. 16 (N.I.)	8 November 1949
An Act to provide for the establishment of a fund to be known as the Ulster Land Fund for the purpose of reducing the liabilities of the county councils and the corporation of the city of Londonderry, for the payment of certain sums out of that fund, and for purposes connected with the matters aforesaid.
Marriage (Prohibited Degrees of Relationship) Act (Northern Ireland) 1949	1949 c. 17 (N.I.)	8 November 1949
Flax Act (Northern Ireland) 1949	1949 c. 18 (N.I.)	29 November 1949
Expiring Laws Continuance Act (Northern Ireland) 1949	1949 c. 19 (N.I.)	13 December 1949
National Insurance (Amendment) Act (Northern Ireland) 1949	1949 c. 20 (N.I.)	13 December 1949
Public Health and Local Government (Miscellaneous Provisions) Act (Northern Ireland) 1949	1949 c. 21 (N.I.)	13 December 1949
An Act to extend the powers of sanitary authorities with respect to the supply of water and vary the notice to be given by them respecting sewage works; to amend the law relating to the constitution and powers of certain joint boards, and to the guarantee of certain deficits incurred by statutory water undertakings; to amend the law relating to the borrowing powers of local authorities and the management of housing accommodation provided under the Labourers Acts; to amend section seventeen of the Local Government Act (Northern Ireland), 1934, (Note: Local Government Act (Northern Ireland) 1934 (24 & 25 Geo. 5. c. 22 (N.I.))) as to the liability for certain rates, to extend section two of the Borough Funds (Ireland) Act, 1888, (Note: Borough Funds (Ireland) Act 1888 (51 & 52 Vict. c. 53)) to amend section three of the Local Government Act (Northern Ireland), 1923, (Note: Local Government Act (Northern Ireland) 1923 (13 & 14 Geo. 5. c. 31 (N.I.))) and to declare the effect of section one of the Local Officers' Superannuation Act (Ireland), 1869; (Note: Local Officers' Superannuation Act (Ireland) 1869 (32 & 33 Vict. c. 79)) to amend the law relating to the appointment of committees by local authorities and the proceedings of such committees; to apply sub-section (1) of section four of the Local Government Act (Northern Ireland), 1934, to the county borough of Londonderry; to confer on councils of rural districts certain powers as to numbering of houses and naming of streets; to enable the salaries of judges' criers to be increased; to extend the powers of certain local authorities for the provision of allotments; and for purposes connected with the matters aforesaid.
Fisheries Act (Northern Ireland) 1949	1949 c. 22 (N.I.)	29 December 1949
Finance (Entertainments Duty) Act (Northern Ireland) 1949	1949 c. 23 (N.I.)	29 December 1949
Appropriation (No. 2) Act (Northern Ireland) 1949	1949 c. 24 (N.I.)	29 December 1949

==== Local acts ====
Short title, or popular name	Citation	Royal assent
Long title
Londonderry Gas Act (Northern Ireland) 1949	1949 c. i (N.I.)	8 November 1949
Carrickfergus Urban District Council Act (Northern Ireland) 1949	1949 c. ii (N.I.)	8 November 1949

== 1950–1959 ==
- List of acts of the Parliament of Northern Ireland, 1950–1959

== 1960–1969 ==
- List of acts of the Parliament of Northern Ireland, 1960–1969

== 1970–1972 ==
- List of acts of the Parliament of Northern Ireland from 1970
- List of acts of the Parliament of Northern Ireland from 1971
- List of acts of the Parliament of Northern Ireland from 1972

The Parliament of Northern Ireland was prorogued on 28 March 1972, which was extended indefinitely on 30 March 1972 by s1 of the Northern Ireland (Temporary Provisions) Act 1972. The parliament was finally abolished on 18 July 1973 by s31 of the Northern Ireland Constitution Act 1973.

== See also ==
- List of acts of the Northern Ireland Assembly
- List of orders in Council for Northern Ireland

== Sources ==
- The Statute Law Database has the revised statutes of Northern Ireland (incorporating changes made by legislation up to 31 December 2005) and the Acts made since that date.
- The Belfast Gazette: Archive
