= Industrial school (Great Britain) =

Former children's institutions

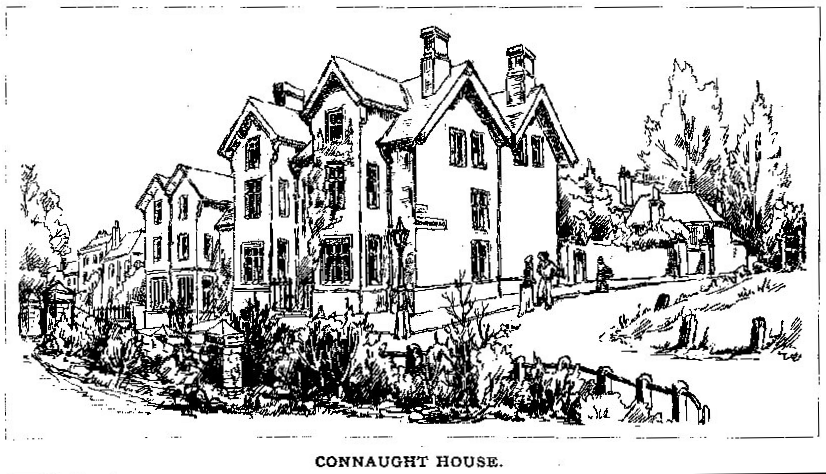
Connaught House 1887 – A Church of England Industrial School in Winchester.

Industrial schools were intended to solve problems of juvenile vagrancy in England by removing poor and neglected children from their home environment to a boarding school. The Industrial Schools Act 1857 (20 & 21 Vict. c. 48) allowed magistrates to send disorderly children to a residential industrial school. An 1876 act Elementary Education Act 1876 (39 & 40 Vict. c. 70) led to non-residential day schools of a similar kind.

There were similar arrangements in Scotland, where the Industrial Schools Act came into force in 1866. The schools cared for neglected children and taught them a trade, with an emphasis on preventing crime. Glasgow Industrial School for Girls is an example formed in 1882.

They were distinct from reformatories set up under the Youthful Offenders Act 1854 (17 & 18 Vict. c. 86) (and the Reformatory Schools (Scotland) Act 1854 (17 & 18 Vict. c. 74)) which included an element of punishment. Both agreed in 1927 to call themselves approved schools.

In Ireland, the Industrial Schools Act (Ireland) 1868 (31 & 32 Vict. c. 25) established industrial schools (Irish: scoileanna saothair) to care for "neglected, orphaned and abandoned children". By 1884 there were 5,049 children in such institutions.

== Context ==
An Industrial Feeding School was opened in Aberdeen in 1846. Industrial schools, like the contemporaneous ragged schools, were set up by volunteers to help destitute children. Their philosophy differed in that they believed that an education was not enough: these children needed to be removed from the harmful environment of the street, trained to be industrious, and given a trade they could practise. Elizabeth Pithie is believed to have been a student before her wages were paid to be a missionary in 1879 in what is now Malawi.

Some schools were residential, but other children were day-boys. The regime was severe, with a tightly timetabled daily routine that stretched from waking at 6:00am to bedtime at 7:00pm.

During the day there were set times for religion and moral guidance, formal schooling, doing housework, eating, and learning trades, with three intervals for play. The boys' trades were gardening, tailoring, and shoemaking; the girls learned housework and washing, knitting, and sewing.

== Industrial Schools Act 1857 ==
Industrial Schools Act 1857 (Note: Section 1.)
- Act of Parliament
- Parliament of the United Kingdom
- Long title: An Act to make better Provision for the Care and Education of vagrant, destitute, and disorderly Children, and for Extension of Industrial Schools.
- Citation: 20 & 21 Vict. c. 48
- Territorial extent: England and Wales (Note: Section 25.)

Dates
- Royal assent: 17 August 1857
- Commencement: 17 August 1857 (Note: The Acts of Parliament (Commencement) Act 1793.)
- Repealed: 6 August 1861
Other legislation
Amended by	Industrial Schools Act 1860
Repealed by	Industrial Schools Act 1861

Status: Repealed

Text of statute as originally enacted

The Industrial Schools Act 1857 (20 & 21 Vict. c. 48) gave magistrates the power to sentence homeless children between the ages of 7 and 14, who were brought before the courts for vagrancy to a spell in an industrial school.

In 1861, the Industrial Schools Act 1861 (24 & 25 Vict. c. 113) strengthened the powers of the magistrate "to include:

- Any child apparently under the age of fourteen found begging or receiving alms (money or goods given as charity to the poor).
- Any child apparently under the age of fourteen found wandering and not having any home or visible means of support, or in company of reputed thieves.
- Any child apparently under the age of twelve who, having committed an offence punishable by imprisonment or less.
- Any child under the age of fourteen whose parents declare him to be beyond their control".

The Industrial Schools (Scotland) Act 1861 (24 & 25 Vict. c. 132) made similar provisions for Scotland.

The Industrial Schools Act 1866 (29 & 30 Vict. c. 118) further consolidated provisions related to industrial schools.

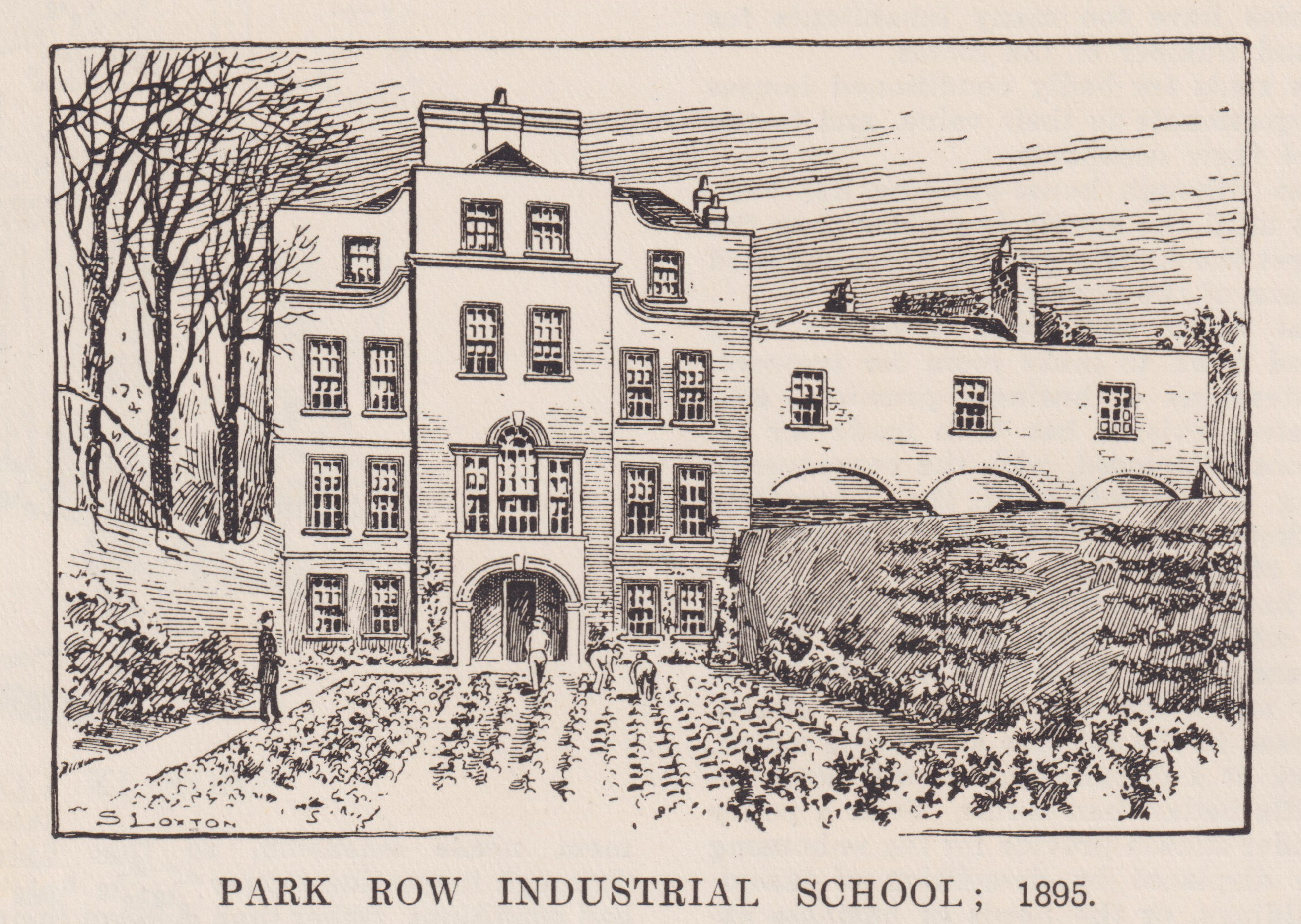
Park Row Industrial School, Bristol, 1895, est. 1858

It was not until 1875 that it became compulsory for parents to register births, and vagrants often genuinely did not know their age. Also, children would say any age that was convenient to them at the time.

Homeless children who had not committed any more serious crime were sent to industrial schools, and children who had been arrested for other crimes were sent to juvenile prisons known as reformatories.

The first institution to be certified under the act was the Park Row Industrial School, Bristol founded by Mary Carpenter in 1858.

== Financial accountability ==
The intention was that the cost of attending such a school would be met by the parents, which was an interesting concept for a child who was sent there because he was already homeless. The state had to provide. The system expanded rapidly, and magistrates preferred to send miscreants to a school rather than a reformatory. There was public unrest about the mounting cost. From 1870, responsibility for the Industrial schools passed to the local Committee of Education.

Best estimates suggest that, at the peak, there were 224 certified industrial schools in England and 50 in Scotland. There were others operating without certification or when certification had been removed. Name changing was common. Directly after World War I, 100 closed and by 1933 there were only 55 remaining. They agreed to change their names to approved schools in 1927, and the Approved Schools Act 1933 merged them to form a single system.

== See also ==
- Magdalene asylum (or Magdalene laundries), penitentiary workhouses in the UK, Ireland and elsewhere from 1758
- Haut de la Garenne, an industrial school in Saint Martin, Jersey, founded 1867

== Bibliography ==
- Report of the Commission to Inquire into Child Abuse, 2009.Report, IE: Child abuse commission.
- Vaccine trials (report), IE: Child abuse commission, 5 June 2003. Vaccine Trials
