= Glasgow Industrial School for Girls =

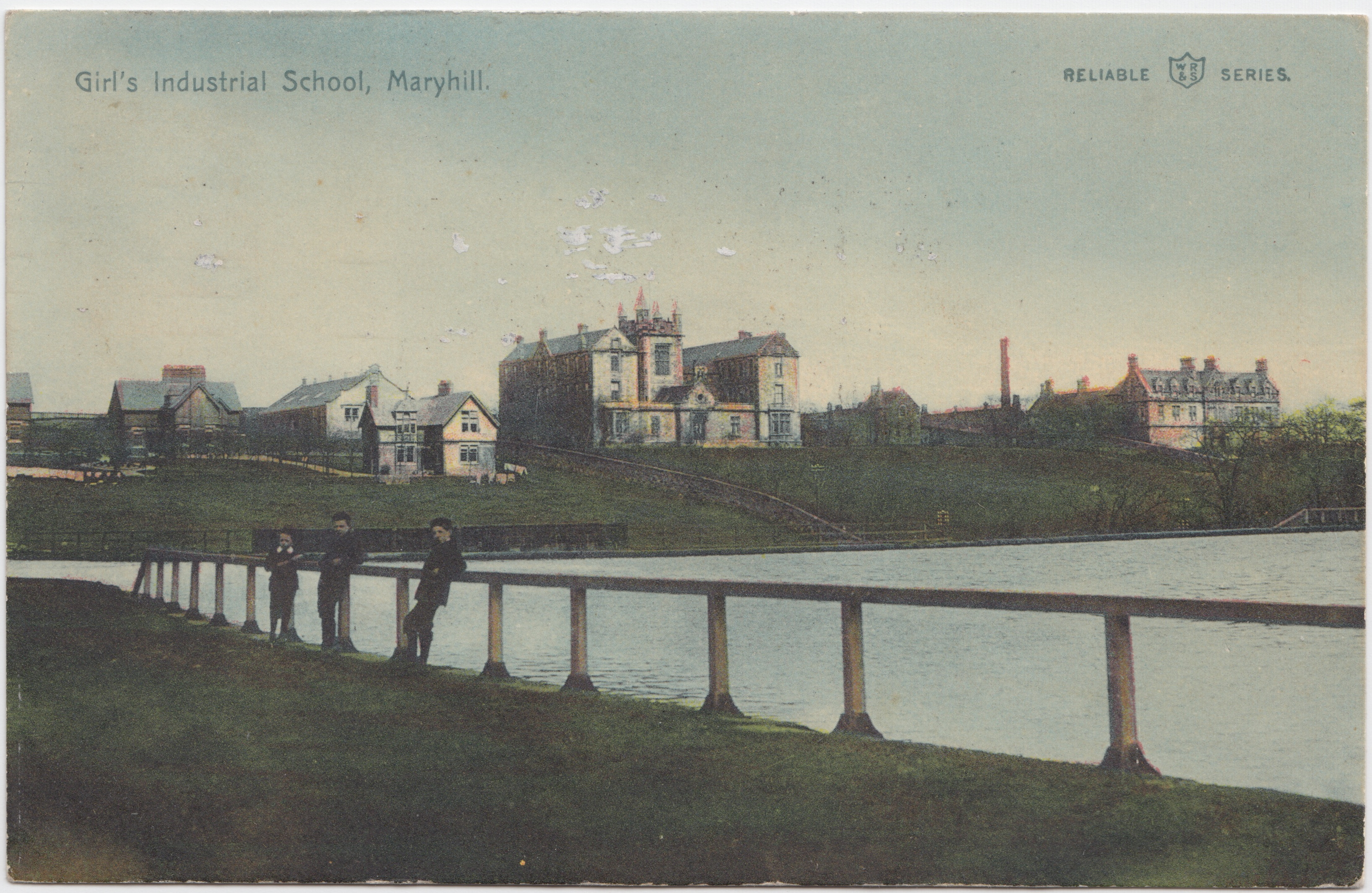

Information
- School type: Industrial school
- Established: 1881; 145 years ago (unofficially); 23 February 1882; 143 years ago (officially)
- Closed: 21 October 1951; 74 years ago
- Gender: Girls
- Age: 9 to 14
- Enrollment: c. 200 (1881)

Glasgow Industrial School for Girls was formed in 1881 when the mixed industrial school was split into a new location in Maryhill, Glasgow.

== History ==
It was a residential workhouse that provided education for girls from families that could not support them. It reached notoriety in October 1881 when the assistant superintendent resigned following public outcry over a flogging she administered. Miss Jessie Wallace, the superintendent of the school, had flogged a girl for absconding from the school despite promising she would not. The broken promise and the severity of the flogging led to Miss Wallace being forced to resign.

The school was closed in 1951 and the buildings were used for the Glasgow School for the Deaf.

== Infrastructure ==
The school consisted of a main building and four cottage homes, which each housed 20 of the youngest girls.

The school rented a seaside cottage at Millport for three months in the summer, where 6 to 8 girls could stay at a time, in the belief that it would help those girls who suffered from chronic illnesses.

In June 1882, an inspection of the school found that the cottage homes were too cold in the winter and the play equipment was insufficient. By 1896, improvements had been made, including new baths, and the inspectors were generally happy with the condition of the school.

== Curriculum ==
The girls were taught sewing, knitting, housework, helping in the kitchen and laundry, and machine work. They made uniforms for the boys in the associated industrial school. On moving to Maryhill, there were two hundred girls. Aside from vocational lessons, the girls were also taught maths, singing, English, physical education, and geography.
