= Reformatory Schools Act 1866 =

Act of the Parliament of the United Kingdom

Reformatory Schools Act 1866 (Note: Section 1.)
- Act of Parliament
- Parliament of the United Kingdom
- Long title: An Act to consolidate and amend the Acts relating to Reformatory Schools in Great Britain.
- Citation: 29 & 30 Vict. c. 117
- Territorial extent: England and Wales; Scotland; (Note: Section 2.)

Dates
- Royal assent: 10 August 1866
- Commencement: 10 August 1866 (Note: The Acts of Parliament (Commencement) Act 1793.)
- Repealed: 1 April 1909
Other legislation
Amends	See § Repealed enactments
Repeals/revokes	See § Repealed enactments
Repealed by	Children Act 1908
Relates to	Industrial Schools Act 1866

Status: Repealed

Text of statute as originally enacted

The Reformatory Schools Act 1866 (29 & 30 Vict. c. 117) was an act of the Parliament of the United Kingdom that consolidated enactments related to reformatory schools in Great Britain.

== Provisions ==
=== Repealed enactments ===
Section 37 of the act repealed 5 enactments, listed in that section.

Citation	Short title	Description	Extent of repeal
1 & 2 Vict. c. 82	Parkhurst Prison Act 1838	The Act of the Session of the First and Second Years of Her present Majesty, Chapter Eighty-two, intituled An Act for establishing a Prison for young Offenders.	Section eleven.
17 & 18 Vict. c. 86	Youthful Offenders Act 1854	The Act of the Session of the Seventeenth and Eighteenth Years of Her present Majesty, Chapter Eighty-six, intituled An Act for the better Care and Reformation of youthful Offenders in Great Britain.	The whole act.
18 & 19 Vict. c. 87	Youthful Offenders Act 1855	The Act of the Session of the Eighteenth and Nineteenth Years of Her present Majesty, Chapter Eighty-seven, intituled An Act to amend the Act for the better Care and Reformation of youthful Offenders, and the Act to render Reformatory and Industrial Schools in Scotland more available for the Benefit of Vagrant Children.	The whole act.
19 & 20 Vict. c. 109	Reformatory, etc., Schools Act 1856	The Act of the Session of the Nineteenth and Twentieth Years of Her present Majesty, Chapter One hundred and nine, intituled An Act to amend the Mode of committing Criminal and Vagrant Children to Reformatory and Industrial Schools.	The whole act.
20 & 21 Vict. c. 55	Reformatory Schools (England) Act 1857	The Act of the Session of the Twentieth and Twenty-first Years of Her present Majesty, Chapter Fifty-five, intituled An Act to promote the Establishment and Extension of Reformatory Schools in England.	The whole act.

== Subsequent developments ==
The whole act was repealed by section 134(3) of, and the third schedule to, the Children Act 1908 (8 Edw. 7. c. 67), which came into force on 1 April 1909.
