= Industrial Schools (Scotland) Act 1861 =

Act of the Parliament of the United Kingdom

Industrial Schools (Scotland) Act 1861 (Note: Section 1.)
- Act of Parliament
- Parliament of the United Kingdom
- Long title: An Act for consolidating and amending the Law relating to Industrial Schools in Scotland.
- Citation: 24 & 25 Vict. c. 132
- Territorial extent: Scotland (Note: Section 2.)

Dates
- Royal assent: 6 August 1861
- Commencement: 6 August 1861 (Note: The Acts of Parliament (Commencement) Act 1793.)
- Expired: 1 January 1864 (Note: Section 31.)
- Repealed: 10 August 1866

Other legislation
- Amends: See § Repealed enactments
- Repeals/revokes: See § Repealed enactments
- Amended by: Industrial Schools 1861 Acts Continuance Act 1862
- Repealed by: Industrial Schools Act 1866
- Relates to: Industrial Schools Act 1861

Status: Repealed

Text of statute as originally enacted

The Industrial Schools (Scotland) Act 1861 (24 & 25 Vict. c. 132) was an act of the Parliament of the United Kingdom that consolidated enactments related to industrial schools in Scotland.

== Provisions ==
=== Repealed enactments ===
Section 29 of the act repealed 2 enactments, listed in that section. The repeal did not affect any certificate given, or anything done, under an act thereby repealed; any order made under an act thereby repealed; or any penalty, forfeiture, or other punishment incurred under an act thereby repealed, or any remedy for recovering or enforcing it.

Citation	Short title	Description	Extent of repeal
17 & 18 Vict. c. 74	Reformatory Schools (Scotland) Act 1854	An Act to render Reformatory and Industrial Schools in Scotland more available for the Benefit of Vagrant Children.	The whole act.
19 & 20 Vict. c. 28	Reformatory Schools (Scotland) Act 1856	An Act to make further Provision for rendering Reformatory and Industrial Schools in Scotland more available for the Benefit of Vagrant Children.	The whole act.

== Subsequent developments ==
The continuance of the act, and of the Industrial Schools Act 1861 (24 & 25 Vict. c. 113), was extended to 1 January 1867 by section 1 of the Industrial Schools 1861 Acts Continuance Act 1862 (25 & 26 Vict. c. 10). The whole act was repealed by section 3 of, and the first schedule to, the Industrial Schools Act 1866 (29 & 30 Vict. c. 118), which came into force on 10 August 1866.
