= Industrial Schools Act 1861 =

Act of the Parliament of the United Kingdom

Industrial Schools Act 1861 (Note: Section 1.)
- Act of Parliament
- Parliament of the United Kingdom
- Long title: An Act for amending and consolidating the Law relating to Industrial Schools.
- Citation: 24 & 25 Vict. c. 113
- Territorial extent: England and Wales (Note: Section 2.)

Dates
- Royal assent: 6 August 1861
- Commencement: 6 August 1861 (Note: The Acts of Parliament (Commencement) Act 1793.)
- Expired: 1 January 1864 (Note: Section 29.)
- Repealed: 10 August 1866

Other legislation
- Amends: See § Repealed enactments
- Repeals/revokes: See § Repealed enactments
- Amended by: Industrial Schools 1861 Acts Continuance Act 1862
- Repealed by: Industrial Schools Act 1866
- Relates to: Industrial Schools (Scotland) Act 1861

Status: Repealed

Text of statute as originally enacted

The Industrial Schools Act 1861 (24 & 25 Vict. c. 113) was an act of the Parliament of the United Kingdom that consolidated enactments related to industrial schools in England and Wales.

== Provisions ==
=== Repealed enactments ===
Section 27 of the act repealed 2 enactments, listed in that section. The repeal did not affect any certificate given or anything duly done under the repealed acts, any order made under them, or any penalty, forfeiture or other punishment incurred under them, or any remedy for recovering or enforcing the same.

Citation	Short title	Description	Extent of repeal
20 & 21 Vict. c. 48	Industrial Schools Act 1857	An Act to make better Provision for the Care and Education of vagrant, destitute, and disorderly Children, and for the Extension of Industrial Schools.	The whole act.
23 & 24 Vict. c. 108	Industrial Schools Act 1860	An Act to amend the Industrial Schools Act, 1857.	The whole act.

== Subsequent developments ==
Section 29 of the act provided that it would remain in force only until 1 January 1864. (Note: Section 29.) Its operation, and the operation of orders made under it, was continued by the Industrial Schools 1861 Acts Continuance Act 1862 (25 & 26 Vict. c. 10).

The whole act was repealed by section 3 of, and the first schedule to, the Industrial Schools Act 1866 (29 & 30 Vict. c. 118), which came into force on 10 August 1866.
