= Industrial Schools Act 1866 =

Act of the Parliament of the United Kingdom

Industrial Schools Act 1866 (Note: Section 1.)
- Act of Parliament
- Parliament of the United Kingdom
- Long title: An Act to consolidate and amend the Acts relating to Industrial Schools in Great Britain.
- Citation: 29 & 30 Vict. c. 118
- Territorial extent: England and Wales; Scotland; (Note: Section 2.)

Dates
- Royal assent: 10 August 1866
- Commencement: 10 August 1866 (Note: The Acts of Parliament (Commencement) Act 1793.)
- Repealed: 1 April 1909
Other legislation
Repeals/revokes	See § Repealed enactments
Amended by	Industrial Schools Acts Amendment Act 1894
Repealed by	Children Act 1908
Relates to	Reformatory Schools Act 1866

Status: Repealed

Text of statute as originally enacted

The Industrial Schools Act 1866 (29 & 30 Vict. c. 118) was an act of the Parliament of the United Kingdom that consolidated enactments related to industrial schools in Great Britain.

== Provisions ==
=== Repealed enactments ===
Section 3 of the act repealed 3 enactments, listed in the first schedule to the act. The repeal did not affect the past operation of any of the repealed acts, or the force or operation of any certificate, order, rule, or sentence made or passed, or the validity or invalidity of anything done or suffered, or any right, title, obligation, or liability accrued before the passing of the act; nor did the act interfere with the institution or prosecution of any proceeding in respect of any offence committed against, or any penalty or forfeiture incurred under, any act thereby repealed.

Citation	Short title	Description	Extent of repeal
24 & 25 Vict. c. 113	Industrial Schools Act 1861	The Industrial Schools Act, 1861.	The whole act.
24 & 25 Vict. c. 132	Industrial Schools (Scotland) Act 1861	The Industrial Schools (Scotland) Act, 1861.	The whole act.
25 & 26 Vict. c. 10	Industrial Schools 1861 Acts Continuance Act 1862	An Act for continuing for a further limited Time, and for extending the Operation of Orders made under the Industrial Schools Act, 1861, and The Industrial Schools (Scotland) Act, 1861.	The whole act.

== Subsequent developments ==
The whole act was repealed by section 134(3) of, and the third schedule to, the Children Act 1908 (8 Edw. 7. c. 67), which came into force on 1 April 1909.
