= List of acts of the Parliament of the United Kingdom from 1861 =

This is a complete list of acts of the Parliament of the United Kingdom for the years 1861.

Note that the first parliament of the United Kingdom was held in 1801; parliaments between 1707 and 1800 were either parliaments of Great Britain or of Ireland). For acts passed up until 1707, see the list of acts of the Parliament of England and the list of acts of the Parliament of Scotland. For acts passed from 1707 to 1800, see the list of acts of the Parliament of Great Britain. See also the list of acts of the Parliament of Ireland.

For acts of the devolved parliaments and assemblies in the United Kingdom, see the list of acts of the Scottish Parliament, the list of acts of the Northern Ireland Assembly, and the list of acts and measures of Senedd Cymru; see also the list of acts of the Parliament of Northern Ireland.

The number shown after each act's title is its chapter number. Acts passed before 1963 are cited using this number, preceded by the year(s) of the reign during which the relevant parliamentary session was held; thus the Union with Ireland Act 1800 is cited as "39 & 40 Geo. 3 c. 67", meaning the 67th act passed during the session that started in the 39th year of the reign of George III and which finished in the 40th year of that reign. Note that the modern convention is to use Arabic numerals in citations (thus "41 Geo. 3" rather than "41 Geo. III"). Acts of the last session of the Parliament of Great Britain and the first session of the Parliament of the United Kingdom are both cited as "41 Geo. 3".

Some of these acts have a short title. Some of these acts have never had a short title. Some of these acts have a short title given to them by later acts, such as by the Short Titles Act 1896.

== 24 & 25 Vict. ==
The third session of the 18th Parliament of the United Kingdom, which met from 5 February 1861 until 6 August 1861.

=== Public general acts ===
Short title	Citation	Royal assent
Long title
Annual Inclosure Act 1861	24 & 25 Vict. c. 1	22 March 1861
An Act to authorize the Inclosure of certain Lands in pursuance of a Report of the Inclosure Commissioners for England and Wales.
Consolidated Fund (4,000,000) Act or the Supply Act 1861 (repealed)	24 & 25 Vict. c. 2	22 March 1861
An Act to apply the Sum of Four Millions out of the Consolidated Fund to the Service of the Year One thousand eight hundred and sixty-one. (Repealed by Statute Law Revision Act 1875 (38 & 39 Vict. c. 66))
Bank of England Act 1861 (repealed)	24 & 25 Vict. c. 3	22 March 1861
An Act to make further Provision respecting certain Payments to and from the Bank of England, and to increase the Facilities for the Transfer of Stocks and Annuities, and for other Purposes. (Repealed by Government Stock (Consequential and Transitional Provision) (No. 2) Order 2004 (SI 2004/1662))
Red Sea and India Telegraph Company Act 1861 (repealed)	24 & 25 Vict. c. 4	22 March 1861
An Act for amending the Red Sea and India Telegraph Act, 1859. (Note: Red Sea and India Telegraph Act 1859) (Repealed by Statute Law Revision Act 1875 (38 & 39 Vict. c. 66))
Exchequer Bills Act 1861 (repealed)	24 & 25 Vict. c. 5	18 April 1861
An Act to amend the Law relating to Supply Exchequer Bills, and to charge the same on the Consolidated Fund. (Repealed by Exchequer Bills and Bonds Act 1866 (29 & 30 Vict. c. 25))
Consolidated Fund (3,000,000) Act or the Supply (No. 2) Act 1861 (repealed)	24 & 25 Vict. c. 6	18 April 1861
An Act to apply the Sum of Three Millions out of the Consolidated Fund to the Service of the Tear One thousand eight hundred and sixty-one. (Repealed by Statute Law Revision Act 1875 (38 & 39 Vict. c. 66))
Mutiny Act 1861 (repealed)	24 & 25 Vict. c. 7	18 April 1861
An Act for punishing Mutiny and Desertion, and for the better Payment of the Army and their Quarters. (Repealed by Statute Law Revision Act 1875 (38 & 39 Vict. c. 66))
Marine Mutiny Act 1861 (repealed)	24 & 25 Vict. c. 8	18 April 1861
An Act for the Regulation of Her Majesty's Royal Marine Forces while on shore. (Repealed by Statute Law Revision Act 1875 (38 & 39 Vict. c. 66))
Charitable Uses Act 1861 (repealed)	24 & 25 Vict. c. 9	17 May 1861
An Act to amend the Law relating to the Conveyance of Land for Charitable Uses. (Repealed by Mortmain and Charitable Uses Act 1888 (51 & 52 Vict. c. 42))
Admiralty Court Act 1861 (repealed)	24 & 25 Vict. c. 10	17 May 1861
An Act to extend the Jurisdiction and improve the Practice of the High Court of Admiralty. (Repealed for Northern Ireland by Statute Law Revision Act 1953 (2 & 3 Eliz. 2. c. 5) and for England and Wales by Senior Courts Act 1981 (c. 54))
Foreign Law Ascertainment Act 1861 (repealed)	24 & 25 Vict. c. 11	17 May 1861
An Act to afford Facilities for the better Ascertainment of the Law of Foreign Countries when pleaded in Courts within Her Majesty's Dominions. (Repealed by Statute Law (Repeals) Act 1973 (c. 39))
County Contributions to Prisons, etc. Act 1861 (repealed)	24 & 25 Vict. c. 12	17 May 1861
An Act for the Abolition of Contributions by Counties for the Relief of Prisoners in the Queen's Prison, and for the Benefit of Bethlem Hospital. (Repealed by Statute Law Revision Act 1875 (38 & 39 Vict. c. 66))
Plymouth Marine Barracks Act 1861	24 & 25 Vict. c. 13	17 May 1861
An Act to enable the Admiralty to acquire Property for the Enlargement of the Royal Marine Barracks in the Parish of East Stonehouse in the County of Devon.
Post Office Savings Bank Act 1861 or the Post Office Savings Banks Act 1861 (repealed)	24 & 25 Vict. c. 14	17 May 1861
An Act to grant additional Facilities for depositing small Savings at Interest, with the Security of the Government for due Repayment thereof. (Repealed by Post Office Savings Bank Act 1954 (2 & 3 Eliz. 2. c. 62))
Annuity to Princess Alice Act 1861 (repealed)	24 & 25 Vict. c. 15	17 May 1861
An Act to enable Her Majesty to settle an Annuity on Her Royal Highness the Princess Alice Maud Mary. (Repealed by Statute Law Revision Act 1953 (2 & 3 Eliz. 2. c. 5))
Confirmation of Marriages Act 1861 (repealed)	24 & 25 Vict. c. 16	17 May 1861
An Act to render valid Marriages heretofore solemnized in Trinity Church, Rainow, and in other Churches and Chapels. (Repealed by Statute Law (Repeals) Act 1977 (c. 18))
Smoke of Furnaces (Scotland) Act 1861 (repealed)	24 & 25 Vict. c. 17	7 June 1861
An Act to amend an Act of the Twentieth and Twenty-first Years of the Reign of Her Majesty, (Note: Smoke Nuisance (Scotland) Act 1857 (20 & 21 Vict. c. 73)) for the Abatement of the Nuisance arising from the Smoke of Furnaces in Scotland. (Repealed by Statute Law Revision Act 1892 (55 & 56 Vict. c. 19))
Poor Law (Scotland) (No. 1) Act 1861 (repealed)	24 & 25 Vict. c. 18	7 June 1861
An Act to make Provision for the Dissolution of Combinations of Parishes in Scotland as to the Management of the Poor. (Repealed by Local Government (Scotland) Act 1947 (10 & 11 Geo. 6. c. 43))
Consolidated Fund (10,000,000) Act or the Supply (No. 3) Act 1861 (repealed)	24 & 25 Vict. c. 19	7 June 1861
An Act to apply the Sum of Ten Millions out of the Consolidated Fund to the Service of the Year One thousand eight hundred and sixty-one. (Repealed by Statute Law Revision Act 1875 (38 & 39 Vict. c. 66))
Customs and Inland Revenue Act 1861 (repealed)	24 & 25 Vict. c. 20	12 June 1861
An Act to continue certain Duties of Customs and Inland Revenue for the Service of Her Majesty, and to alter and repeal certain other Duties. (Repealed by Statute Law Revision Act 1875 (38 & 39 Vict. c. 66) and Customs Consolidation Act 1876 (39 & 40 Vict. c. 36))
Revenue (No. 1) Act 1861 (repealed)	24 & 25 Vict. c. 21	28 June 1861
An Act for granting to Her Majesty certain Duties of Excise and Stamps. (Repealed by Finance Act 1949 (12, 13 & 14 Geo. 6. c. 47))
Burford Charities Act 1861	24 & 25 Vict. c. 22	28 June 1861
An Act for confirming a Scheme of the Charity Commissioners for certain Charities in the Town and Parish of Burford in the County of Oxford.
	For the Application and Management of the several Charities in the Town and Parish of Burford in the County of Oxford, herein-after mentioned or referred to, namely:—: 1. Poole's Estate; the School, including Wisdom's, Symon's, Reynold's, Rolfe's, Richard Hunt's, and William Hunt's gifts.; 2. The Tradesman's Fund, including all sorts of money, and Cleaveley's, Hopton's, Lenthall's, Hayter's, and Harris' Gifts.; 3. The Fifteenths Estate, or John Hill's Gift.; 4. The Great Almshouse and Wisdom's Almshouse.; 5. The Church Estate, including More's, Rolfe's, and Hunt's gifts.; And the several other Charities heretofore vested in or under the management of the Feoffees or Trustees of the Burford Charities, or the Corporation of the Borough of Burford respectively.	
Reading Charities Act 1861	24 & 25 Vict. c. 23	28 June 1861
An Act for confirming a Scheme of the Charity Commissioners for certain Charities in the Borough of Reading.
	Scheme for the Application and Management of the herein-after mentioned Charities in the Borough of Reading:—: 1. A'Larder's Almshouses and Bernard Harrison's Almshouses, and the several subsidiary foundations and endowments heretofore created or appropriated for the maintenance or benefit of the same almshouses respectively, or the inmates thereof:— And also as to the several Charities of Robert Boyer, John Balle, Richard Ironside, Augustine Knapp, John Noyse, Dr. Swaddon, Richard Turnor, Rodolph Warcupp, Thomas Lane, Joseph Carter, Peter Wyboe, William Thorne, Mary Worsley, Edward Kemys, Edward Hamblin, William Brackstone, John Eyre, Willlam Joanes, Thomas Deane, James Pocock, William Iremonger, and Mary Love.; 2. Kendrick's Almshouses, Sir Thomas Yachell's Almshouses, and Hall's Almshouses, and the several subsidiary foundations and endowments heretofore created or appropriated for the maintenance or benefit of the same almshouses respectively or the respective inmates thereof, and also as to Richard Johnson's Charity.; 3. The several Charities known respectively as Thomas Lydell's Charity, Edward Simeon's Bread Gift, Sir John Simeon's Bread Gift, and Sir Thomas White's Charity for Loans.; 4. The several Charities known respectively as John Blagraye's Charity; William Boudry's and John Richard's Charity; and Martin Annesley's Charity.; 5. Elizabeth Deane's Charity.; 6. Richard Aldworth's Charity.	
Temple Balsall Hospital Act 1861	24 & 25 Vict. c. 24	28 June 1861
An Act for confirming a Scheme of the Charity Commissioners for the Hospital of Lady Katherine Leveson at Temple Balsall in the County of Warwick.
	Scheme for the Regulation and Management of the Hospital of Lady Katherine Leveson at Temple Balsall in the county of Warwick.	
East India Loan Act 1861 (repealed)	24 & 25 Vict. c. 25	28 June 1861
An Act to enable the Secretary of State in Council of India to raise Money in the United Kingdom for the Service of the Government of India. (Repealed by East India Loans Act 1937 (1 Edw. 8 & 1 Geo. 6. c. 14))
Dublin Improvement Act Amendment Act 1861 or the Dublin Improvement Act 1861	24 & 25 Vict. c. 26	28 June 1861
An Act to amend the Dublin Improvement Act, 1849. (Note: Dublin Improvement Act 1849 (12 & 13 Vict. c. 97))
Assessments in Edinburgh Act 1861 (repealed)	24 & 25 Vict. c. 27	28 June 1861
An Act to declare the Limits within which increased Assessments are authorized to be raised in the City of Edinburgh, under the Provisions of the Act of the Twenty-third and Twenty-fourth Years of Victoria, Chapter Fifty. (Note: Annuity Tax Abolition Act 1860 (23 & 24 Vict. c. 50)) (Repealed by Statute Law (Repeals) Act 1975 (c. 10))
Holyhead Road Relief Act 1861 or the Holyhead Road Act 1861 (repealed)	24 & 25 Vict. c. 28	11 July 1861
An Act to relieve certain Trusts on the Holyhead Road from Debts. (Repealed by Annual Turnpike Acts Continuance Act 1871 (34 & 35 Vict. c. 115) and Statute Law (Repeals) Act 2013 (c. 2))
Cork Infirmary Act 1861	24 & 25 Vict. c. 29	11 July 1861
An Act to authorize the Removal of the Infirmary for the County of Cork from the Town of Mallow to the City of Cork.
New Zealand Provinces Act 1861 (repealed)	24 & 25 Vict. c. 30	11 July 1861
An Act to declare the Validity of an Act passed by the General Assembly of New Zealand, intituled "An Act to provide for the Establishment of new Provinces in New Zealand." (Note: New Provinces Act 1858 (21 & 22 Vict. No. 70 (NZ))) (Repealed by New Zealand Constitution Act 1862 (25 & 26 Vict. c. 48))
Sierra Leone Offences Act 1861 (repealed)	24 & 25 Vict. c. 31	11 July 1861
An Act for the Prevention and Punishment of Offences committed by Her Majesty's Subjects within certain Territories adjacent to the Colony of Sierra Leone. (Repealed by Statute Law Revision Act 1958 (6 & 7 Eliz. 2. c. 46))
Guildford Hospital Act 1861	24 & 25 Vict. c. 32	11 July 1861
An Act for confirming a Scheme of the Charity Commissioners for "The Hospital of the Blessed Trinity" at Guildford in the County of Surrey, and its subsidiary Endowments, with certain Alterations.
	Scheme for the Application and Management of the Charity called "The Hospital of the Blessed Trinity" at Guildford in the County of Surrey, and its subsidiary Endowments.	
Supplemental Public Offices Extension Act 1861	24 & 25 Vict. c. 33	11 July 1861
An Act to enable the Commissioners of Her Majesty's Works to acquire additional Land for the Purposes of the Public Offices Extension Act of 1859. (Note: Public Offices Extension Act 1859 (22 Vict. c. 19))
Improvement of Land (Ireland) Act 1861 (repealed)	24 & 25 Vict. c. 34	11 July 1861
An Act to extend the Provisions of the Acts to facilitate the Improvement of Landed Property in Ireland, and to further provide for the Erection of Dwellings for the Labouring Poor in Ireland. (Repealed by Statute Law Revision Act 1875 (38 & 39 Vict. c. 66))
National Debt Act 1861 (repealed)	24 & 25 Vict. c. 35	22 July 1861
An Act to increase the Facilities for the Transfer of Stocks and Annuities transferable at the Bank of Ireland, and to make further Provision respecting the mutual Transfer of Capital in certain Public Stocks or Funds transferable at the Banks of England and Ireland respectively, and for other Purposes. (Repealed by Statute Law Revision Act 1870 (33 & 34 Vict. c. 69))
Boundaries of Burghs Extension (Scotland) Act 1861 (repealed)	24 & 25 Vict. c. 36	22 July 1861
An Act to amend the Boundaries of Burghs Extension (Scotland) Act. (Note: Boundaries of Burghs Extension (Scotland) Act 1857 (20 & 21 Vict. c. 70)) (Repealed by Town Councils (Scotland) Act 1900 (63 & 64 Vict. c. 49))
Poor Law (Scotland) (No. 2) Act 1861 (repealed)	24 & 25 Vict. c. 37	22 July 1861
An Act to simplify the Mode of raising the Assessment for the Poor in Scotland. (Repealed by Statute Law Revision Act 1875 (38 & 39 Vict. c. 66) and Statute Law Revision Act 1950 (14 Geo. 6. c. 6))
Second Annual Inclosure Act 1861	24 & 25 Vict. c. 38	22 July 1861
An Act to authorize the Inclosure of certain Lands in pursuance of a Special Report of the Inclosure Commissioners.
Local Government Supplemental Act 1861	24 & 25 Vict. c. 39	22 July 1861
An Act to confirm certain Provisional Orders under the Local Government Act (1858), (Note: Local Government Act 1858 (21 & 22 Vict. c. 98)) relating to the Districts of Brighton, East Cowes, Preston, Morpeth, Bromsgrove, and Durham; and for other Purposes in relation thereto.
	Provisional Order repealing and altering Parts of Local Acts in force within the District of the Brighton Local Board.	
	Provisional Order repealing a Local Act (Note: Isle of Wight Roads Act 1813 (53 Geo. 3. c. xcii)) in force within the District of the East Cowes Local Board.	
	Provisional Order for repealing and altering Parts of a Local Act (Note: Preston Waterworks Act 1853 (16 & 17 Vict. c. xlviii)) in force within the District of Preston; for extending the Borrowing Powers of the Preston Local Board of Health; for extending the Time for paying off Sums borrowed by such Board; and for other Purposes.	
	Provisional Order for altering the Boundaries of the District of Morpeth in the County of Northumberland, as constituted for the Purposes of the Public Health Act, 1848. (Note: Public Health Act 1848 (11 & 12 Vict. c. 63))	
	Provisional Order for altering the Boundaries of the District of Bromsgrove in the County of Worcester, under the Local Government Act, 1858.	
	Provisional Order putting in force the Lands Clauses Consolidation Act, 1845, (Note: Lands Clauses Consolidation Act 1845 (8 & 9 Vict. c. 18)) within the District of the Durham Local Board of Healthy for the Purchase of Lands by the said Board for Street Improvements.	
Dean Forest Act 1861	24 & 25 Vict. c. 40	22 July 1861
An Act to make further Provision for the Management of Her Majesty's Forest of Dean, and of the Mines and Quarries therein and in the Hundred of Saint Briavels in the County of Gloucester.
Chatham Dockyard Act 1861	24 & 25 Vict. c. 41	22 July 1861
An Act to enable the Admiralty to acquire Property for the Enlargement of Her Majesty's Dockyard at Chatham in the County of Kent, and to embank Part of the River Medway; and for other Purposes connected therewith.
London Coal and Wine Duties Continuance Act 1861 (repealed)	24 & 25 Vict. c. 42	22 July 1861
An Act to continue the Duties levied on Coal and Wine by the Corporation of London. (Repealed by Statute Law Revision Act 1892 (55 & 56 Vict. c. 19))
Summary Procedure on Bills of Exchange (Ireland) Act 1861 (repealed)	24 & 25 Vict. c. 43	22 July 1861
An Act to facilitate the Remedies on Bills of Exchange and Promissory Notes in Ireland by the Prevention of frivolous or fictitious Defences to Actions thereon. (Repealed by Statute Law Revision Act 1892 (55 & 56 Vict. c. 19))
Australian Colonies Act 1861	24 & 25 Vict. c. 44	22 July 1861
An Act to remove Doubts respecting the Authority of the Legislature of Queensland, and to annex certain Territories to the Colony of South Australia, and for other Purposes.
General Pier and Harbour Act 1861	24 & 25 Vict. c. 45	1 August 1861
An Act to facilitate the Formation, Management, and Maintenance of Piers and Harbours in Great Britain and Ireland. (Repealed for England and Wales and Scotland by Transport and Works Act 1992 (c. 42))
Turnpike Trusts Relief Act 1861 (repealed)	24 & 25 Vict. c. 46	1 August 1861
An Act to confirm certain Provisional Orders made under an Act of the Fifteenth Year of Her present Majesty, (Note: Turnpike Trusts (Making of Provisional Orders) Act 1851 (14 & 15 Vict. c. 38)) to facilitate Arrangements for the Relief of Turnpike Trusts, and to extend the Provisions of the said Act. (Repealed by Statute Law (Repeals) Act 1981 (c. 19))
Harbours and Passing Tolls, &c. Act 1861 or the Harbours and Passing Tolls Act 1861	24 & 25 Vict. c. 47	1 August 1861
An Act to facilitate the Construction and Improvement of Harbours by authorizing Loans to Harbour Authorities; to abolish Passing Tolls; and for other Purposes.
Landlord and Tenant (Ireland) Act 1861 (repealed)	24 & 25 Vict. c. 48	1 August 1861
An Act to provide for the Costs of certain Proceedings to be taken under the Landlord and Tenant Law Amendment (Ireland) Act (1860). (Note: Landlord and Tenant Law Amendment (Ireland) Act 1860 (23 & 24 Vict. c. 154)) (Repealed by Statute Law Revision Act 1893 (56 & 57 Vict. c. 14))
Petty Sessions, Ireland, Amendment Act 1861 or the Petty Sessions (Ireland) Amendment Act 1861 (repealed)	24 & 25 Vict. c. 49	1 August 1861
An Act to enable Justices in Ireland to commit to local Bridewells Persons convicted of Drunkenness. (Repealed by Prison Act (Northern Ireland) 1953 (c. 18 (N.I.)))
Railway Companies Mortgage Transfer (Scotland) Act 1861 (repealed)	24 & 25 Vict. c. 50	1 August 1861
An Act for facilitating the Transfer of Mortgages and Bonds granted by Railway Companies in Scotland. (Repealed by Inland Revenue Repeal Act 1870 (33 & 34 Vict. c. 99))
Metropolitan Police Act 1861 (repealed)	24 & 25 Vict. c. 51	1 August 1861
An Act for granting Pensions to some Officers and Men in the Metropolitan Police Force, and for other Purposes. (Repealed by Police Act 1964 (c. 48))
Australian Passengers Act 1861 (repealed)	24 & 25 Vict. c. 52	1 August 1861
An Act to empower the Governors of the several Australian Colonies to regulate the Number of Passengers to be carried in Vessels plying between Ports in those Colonies. (Repealed by Merchant Shipping Act 1894 (57 & 58 Vict. c. 60))
University Elections Act 1861 (repealed)	24 & 25 Vict. c. 53	1 August 1861
An Act to provide that Votes at Elections for the Universities may be recorded by means of Voting Papers. (Repealed by Statute Law Revision Act 1875 (38 & 39 Vict. c. 66) and Representation of the People Act 1918 (7 & 8 Geo. 5. c. 64))
Indian Civil Service Act 1861 (repealed)	24 & 25 Vict. c. 54	1 August 1861
An Act to confirm certain Appointments in India, and to amend the Law concerning the Civil Service there. (Repealed by Government of India Act 1915 (5 & 6 Geo. 5. c. 61))
Poor Removal Act 1861 (repealed)	24 & 25 Vict. c. 55	1 August 1861
An Act to amend the Laws regarding the Removal of the Poor and the Contribution of Parishes to the Common Fund in Unions. (Repealed by Poor Law Act 1927 (17 & 18 Geo. 5. c. 14))
Dublin Revising Barristers Act 1861 (repealed)	24 & 25 Vict. c. 56	1 August 1861
An Act to make Provision for Salaries for the Revising Barristers for the City of Dublin. (Repealed by Statute Law (Repeals) Act 1993 (c. 50))
Private Lunatic Asylums (Ireland) Act 1861 (repealed)	24 & 25 Vict. c. 57	1 August 1861
An Act to continue an Act of the Fifth and Sixth Years of Her Majesty (Note: Private Lunatic Asylums (Ireland) Act 1842 (5 & 6 Vict. c. 123)) relating to private Lunatic Asylums in Ireland. (Repealed by Statute Law Revision Act 1875 (38 & 39 Vict. c. 66))
County Cess (Ireland) Act 1861 (repealed)	24 & 25 Vict. c. 58	1 August 1861
An Act to continue an Act of the Eleventh and Twelfth Years of Her Majesty (Note: County Cess (Ireland) Act 1848 (11 & 12 Vict.. c. 32)) relating to the Collection of County Cess in Ireland. (Repealed by Statute Law Revision Act 1875 (38 & 39 Vict. c. 66))
Vaccination Acts Amendment Act 1861 (repealed)	24 & 25 Vict. c. 59	1 August 1861
An Act to facilitate Proceedings before Justices under the Acts relating to Vaccination. (Repealed for England and Wales by Vaccination Act 1867 (30 & 31 Vict. c. 84) and for Ireland by Statute Law Revision Act 1875 (38 & 39 Vict. c. 66))
Representation of the People (Ireland) Act 1861 (repealed)	24 & 25 Vict. c. 60	1 August 1861
An Act to amend the Act of the Thirteenth and Fourteenth Years of Her Majesty, Chapter Sixty-nine, (Note: Representation of the People (Ireland) Act 1850 (13 & 14 Vict. c. 69)) so far as relates to the Time thereby limited for the Publication of the Lists of Voters objected to in Ireland. (Repealed by Representation of the People Act 1918 (7 & 8 Geo. 5. c. 64))
Local Government Act (1858) Amendment Act 1861 (repealed)	24 & 25 Vict. c. 61	1 August 1861
An Act to amend the Local Government Act. (Repealed by Public Health Act 1875 (38 & 39 Vict. c. 55))
Crown Suits Act 1861 (repealed)	24 & 25 Vict. c. 62	1 August 1861
An Act to amend the Act of the Ninth Year of King George the Third, Chapter Sixteen, (Note: Crown Suits Act 1769 (9 Geo. 3. c. 16)) for quieting Possessions and Titles against the Crown, and also certain Acts for the like Object relating to Suits by the Duke of Cornwall. (Repealed by Limitation Act 1939 (2 & 3 Geo. 6. c. 21))
County Surveyors, &c. (Ireland) Act 1861 (repealed)	24 & 25 Vict. c. 63	1 August 1861
An Act to enable Grand Juries in Ireland to increase the Remuneration of County Surveyors, and for other Purposes. (Repealed by Local Government (Ireland) Act 1898 (61 & 62 Vict. c. 37))
Annual Turnpike Acts Continuance Act 1861 (repealed)	24 & 25 Vict. c. 64	1 August 1861
An Act to continue certain Turnpike Acts in Great Britain. (Repealed by Statute Law Revision Act 1875 (38 & 39 Vict. c. 66))
Ordnance Survey Continuance Act 1861 (repealed)	24 & 25 Vict. c. 65	1 August 1861
An Act to continue the Survey of Great Britain. Berwick-upon-Tweed and the Isle of Man. (Repealed by Statute Law Revision Act 1875 (38 & 39 Vict. c. 66))
Affirmations Act 1861 (repealed)	24 & 25 Vict. c. 66	1 August 1861
An Act to give Relief to Persons who may refuse or be unwilling, from alleged conscientious Motives, to be sworn in Criminal Proceedings. (Repealed by Oaths Act 1888 (51 & 52 Vict. c. 46))
Indian Councils Act 1861 (repealed)	24 & 25 Vict. c. 67	1 August 1861
An Act to make better Provision for the Constitution of the Council of the Governor General of India, and for the Local Government of the several Presidencies and Provinces of India, and for the temporary Government of India in the event of a Vacancy in the Office of Governor General. (Repealed by Government of India Act 1915 (5 & 6 Geo. 5. c. 61))
Solicitors (Ireland) Act 1861 (repealed)	24 & 25 Vict. c. 68	1 August 1861
An Act to amend the Laws relating to Attorneys and Solicitors in Ireland. (Repealed by Statute Law Revision Act 1875 (38 & 39 Vict. c. 66))
Tramways (Scotland) Act 1861 (repealed)	24 & 25 Vict. c. 69	1 August 1861
An Act to provide for the Formation of Tramways on Turnpike and Statute Labour Roads in Scotland. (Repealed by Statute Law (Repeals) Act 1973 (c. 39))
Locomotive Act 1861	24 & 25 Vict. c. 70	1 August 1861
An Act for regulating the use of locomotives on turnpike and other roads, and the tolls to be levied on such locomotives and on the waggons and carriages drawn or propelled by the same.
Public Works (Ireland) Act 1861 or the Public Works (Ireland) (Advances and Repayments of Moneys) Act 1861 (repealed)	24 & 25 Vict. c. 71	1 August 1861
An Act to provide for the Performance of Duties heretofore performed by the Paymaster of Civil Services in Ireland in relation to Advances and Repayments of Public Monies for Public Works. (Repealed by Statute Law Revision Act 1892 (55 & 56 Vict. c. 19) and Public Works, etc., Loans Act (Northern Ireland) 1953 (c. 13 (N.I.)))
White Herring Fishery (Scotland) Act 1861 (repealed)	24 & 25 Vict. c. 72	1 August 1861
An Act to make further Provision for the Regulation of the British White Herring Fishery in Scotland. (Repealed by Inshore Fishing (Scotland) Act 1984 (c. 26))
Copyright of Designs Act 1861 (repealed)	24 & 25 Vict. c. 73	6 August 1861
An Act to amend the Law relating to the Copyright of Designs. (Repealed by Patents, Designs, and Trade Marks Act 1883 (46 & 47 Vict. c. 57))
Enlistment of Persons Transferred from the Indian Forces Act 1861 (repealed)	24 & 25 Vict. c. 74	6 August 1861
An Act to render lawful the Enlistment of Persons transferred from the Indian to the General Forces of Her Majesty, and to provide in certain respects for the Rights of such Persons. (Repealed by Statute Law Revision Act 1875 (38 & 39 Vict. c. 66))
Municipal Corporations Act Amendment Act 1861 (repealed)	24 & 25 Vict. c. 75	6 August 1861
An Act for amending the Municipal Corporations Act. (Note: Municipal Corporations Act 1857 (20 & 21 Vict. c. 50)) (Repealed by Municipal Corporations Act 1882 (45 & 46 Vict. c. 50))
Poor Removal (No. 2) Act 1861 (repealed)	24 & 25 Vict. c. 76	6 August 1861
An Act to amend the Law relating to the Removal of Poor Persons to Ireland. (Repealed for England and Wales and Scotland by National Assistance Act 1948 (11 & 12 Geo. 6. c. 29) and for Northern Ireland by Statute Law Revision Act (Northern Ireland) 1954 (c. 35 (N.I.)))
Indemnity Act 1861 (repealed)	24 & 25 Vict. c. 77	6 August 1861
An Act to indemnify such Persons in the United Kingdom as have omitted to qualify themselves for Offices and Employments, and to extend the Time limited for those Purposes respectively. (Repealed by Promissory Oaths Act 1871 (34 & 35 Vict. c. 48))
Annoyance Jurors, Westminster Act 1861 (repealed)	24 & 25 Vict. c. 78	6 August 1861
An Act to repeal certain enactments relating to nominating and appointing the householders of Westminster to serve as annoyance jurors, and to make other provisions in lieu thereof. (Repealed by Statute Law (Repeals) Act 1973 (c. 39))
Metropolis Gas Act 1861 (repealed)	24 & 25 Vict. c. 79	6 August 1861
An Act to amend the Metropolis Gas Act. (Note: Metropolis Gas Act 1860 (23 & 24 Vict. c. 125)) (Repealed by Statute Law (Repeals) Act 1977 (c. 18))
Advances for Public Works Act 1861 (repealed)	24 & 25 Vict. c. 80	6 August 1861
An Act to authorize Advances of Money out of the Consolidated Fund for carrying on Public Works and Fisheries for Employment of the Poor, and for facilitating the Construction and Improvement of Harbours; and for other Purposes. (Repealed by Public Works Loans Act 1875 (38 & 39 Vict. c. 89))
Lord Clerk Register (Scotland) Act 1861 (repealed)	24 & 25 Vict. c. 81	6 August 1861
An Act to repeal the Provisions in certain Statutes relative to the Salary of the Lord Clerk Register in Scotland. (Repealed by Statute Law Revision Act 1892 (55 & 56 Vict. c. 19))
Durham University Act 1861 (repealed)	24 & 25 Vict. c. 82	6 August 1861
An Act for making Provision for the good Government and Extension of the University of Durham. (Repealed by Statute Law (Repeals) Act 1998 (c. 43))
County Voters Registration (Scotland) Act 1861 (repealed)	24 & 25 Vict. c. 83	6 August 1861
An Act to amend the Law regarding the Registration of County Voters in Scotland. (Repealed by Representation of the People (Scotland) Act 1868 (31 & 32 Vict. c. 48), Statute Law Revision Act 1875 (38 & 39 Vict. c. 66), Registration Amendment (Scotland) Act 1885 (48 & 49 Vict. c. 16), Statute Law Revision Act 1892 (55 & 56 Vict. c. 19) and Representation of the People Act 1918 (7 & 8 Geo. 5. c. 64))
Trusts (Scotland) Act 1861 (repealed)	24 & 25 Vict. c. 84	6 August 1861
An Act to amend the Law in Scotland relative to the Resignation, Powers, and Liabilities of gratuitous Trustees. (Repealed by Trusts (Scotland) Act 1921 (11 & 12 Geo. 5. c. 58))
Public Works (Ireland) Act 1861 (repealed)	24 & 25 Vict. c. 85	6 August 1861
An Act to authorize for a further Period the Application of Money for the Purposes of Loans for carrying on Public Works in Ireland. (Repealed by Statute Law Revision Act 1875 (38 & 39 Vict. c. 66))
Conjugal Rights (Scotland) Amendment Act 1861 (repealed)	24 & 25 Vict. c. 86	6 August 1861
An Act to amend the Law regarding Conjugal Rights in Scotland. (Repealed by Court of Session Act 1988 (c. 36) and Family Law (Scotland) Act 2006 (asp 2))
Metropolitan Building Amendment Act 1861 (repealed)	24 & 25 Vict. c. 87	6 August 1861
An Act to amend the Metropolitan Building Act (1855). (Note: Metropolitan Building Act 1855 (18 & 19 Vict. c. 122)) (Repealed by London Building Act 1894 (57 & 58 Vict. c. ccxiii))
Public Offices, St. James' Park Act 1861	24 & 25 Vict. c. 88	6 August 1861
An Act to vest in the Commissioners of Her Majesty's Works and Public Buildings a Portion of Saint James's Park AS a Site for Public Offices.
Pensions, British Forces (India) Act 1861 (repealed)	24 & 25 Vict. c. 89	6 August 1861
An Act to increase the Amount payable out of the Revenues of India in respect of the Retiring Pay, Pensions, and other Expenses of that Nature, of Her Majesty's British Forces serving in India. (Repealed by Statute Law Revision Act 1875 (38 & 39 Vict. c. 66))
Edinburgh University Property Arrangement Act 1861	24 & 25 Vict. c. 90	6 August 1861
An Act to make Arrangements as to the Disposal and Management of Property belonging to the University of Edinburgh; and to regulate the Appropriation and Application of the Annuity of Two thousand five hundred Pounds payable from the Revenues of the Harbour and Docks of Leith, under the Authority of an Act passed in the First and Second Years of Victoria, Chapter Fifty-five. (Note: Debt of City of Edinburgh, etc. Act, 1838 (1 & 2 Vict. c. 55))
Revenue (No. 2) Act 1861 (repealed)	24 & 25 Vict. c. 91	6 August 1861
An Act to amend the Laws relating to the Inland Revenue. (Repealed by Statute Law (Repeals) Act 1977 (c. 18))
Probate Duty Act 1861 (repealed)	24 & 25 Vict. c. 92	6 August 1861
An Act to amend the Law for the Collection of the Stamp Duties on Probates, Administrations, Inventories, Legacies, and Successions. (Repealed by Statute Law Revision Act 1892 (55 & 56 Vict. c. 19), Finance Act 1949 (12, 13 & 14 Geo. 6. c. 47) and Finance Act 1975 (c. 7))
Revenue Departments Accounts Act 1861 (repealed)	24 & 25 Vict. c. 93	6 August 1861
An Act to provide for the Preparation, Audit, and Presentation to Parliament of annual Accounts of the Appropriation of the Monies voted for the Revenue Departments. (Repealed by Exchequer and Audit Departments Act 1866 (29 & 30 Vict. c. 39))
Accessories and Abettors Act 1861	24 & 25 Vict. c. 94	6 August 1861
An Act to consolidate and amend the Statute Law of England and Ireland relating to Accessories to and Abettors of indictable Offences.
Criminal Statutes Repeal Act 1861 (repealed)	24 & 25 Vict. c. 95	6 August 1861
An Act to repeal certain Enactments which have been consolidated in several Acts of the present Session relating to indictable Offences and other Matters. (Repealed by Statute Law Revision Act 1950 (14 Geo. 6. c. 6))
Larceny Act 1861 (repealed)	24 & 25 Vict. c. 96	6 August 1861
An Act to consolidate and amend the Statute Law of England and Ireland relating to Larceny and other similar Offences. (Repealed for England and Wales by Theft Act 1968 (c. 60) and for Northern Ireland by Theft Act (Northern Ireland) 1969 (c. 16 (N.I.)))
Malicious Damage Act 1861	24 & 25 Vict. c. 97	6 August 1861
An Act to consolidate and amend the Statute Law of England and Ireland relating to Malicious Injuries to Property.
Forgery Act 1861	24 & 25 Vict. c. 98	6 August 1861
An Act to consolidate and amend the Statute Law of England and Ireland relating to indictable Offences by Forgery.
Coinage Offences Act 1861 (repealed)	24 & 25 Vict. c. 99	6 August 1861
An Act to consolidate and amend the Statute Law of the United Kingdom against Offences relating to the Coin. (Repealed by Coinage Offences Act 1936 (26 Geo. 5 & 1 Edw. 8. c. 16))
Offences against the Person Act 1861	24 & 25 Vict. c. 100	6 August 1861
An Act to consolidate and amend the Statute Law of England and Ireland relating to Offences against the Person.
Statute Law Revision Act 1861 (repealed)	24 & 25 Vict. c. 101	6 August 1861
An Act for promoting the Revision of the Statute Law by repealing divers Acts and Parts of Acts which have ceased to be in force. (Repealed by Statute Law Revision Act 1893 (56 & 57 Vict. c. 14) and Statute Law (Repeals) Act 1998 (c. 43))
Tramways (Ireland) Amendment Act 1861	24 & 25 Vict. c. 102	6 August 1861
An Act to amend the Tramways, Ireland, Act, 1860. (Note: Tramways (Ireland) Act 1860 (23 & 24 Vict. c. 152))
Appropriation Act 1861 (repealed)	24 & 25 Vict. c. 103	6 August 1861
An Act to apply a Sum out of the Consolidated Fund and the Surplus of Ways and Means to the Service of the Year One thousand eight hundred and sixty-one, and to appropriate the Supplies granted in this Session of Parliament. (Repealed by Statute Law Revision Act 1875 (38 & 39 Vict. c. 66))
Indian High Courts Act 1861 (repealed)	24 & 25 Vict. c. 104	6 August 1861
An Act for establishing High Courts of Judicature in India. (Repealed by Government of India Act 1915 (5 & 6 Geo. 5. c. 61))
Ecclesiastical Leases Act 1861 (repealed)	24 & 25 Vict. c. 105	6 August 1861
An Act to prevent the future Grant by Copy of Court Roll and certain Leases of Lands and Hereditaments in England belonging to Ecclesiastical Benefices. (Repealed by Endowments and Glebe Measure 1976 (No. 4))
Portpatrick Harbour Act 1861 (repealed)	24 & 25 Vict. c. 106	6 August 1861
An Act to enable the Admiralty to close the Harbour of Portpatrick in Scotland during the Execution of certain Works in such Harbour sanctioned by Parliament. (Repealed by Portpatrick Harbour Act 1873 (36 & 37 Vict. c. 14))
Parochial and Burgh Schoolmasters (Scotland) Act 1861 (repealed)	24 & 25 Vict. c. 107	6 August 1861
An Act to alter and amend the Law relating to Parochial and Burgh Schools, and to the Test required to be taken by Schoolmasters in Scotland. (Repealed by Education (Scotland) Act 1872 (35 & 36 Vict. c. 62))
Naval Medical Supplemental Fund Society Winding-up Act 1861 (repealed)	24 & 25 Vict. c. 108	6 August 1861
An Act to provide for the winding up the Naval Medical Supplemental Fund Society. (Repealed by Naval Medical Compassionate Fund Act 1915 (5 & 6 Geo. 5. c. 28))
Salmon Fishery Act 1861 or the Salmon Fisheries Act 1861 (repealed)	24 & 25 Vict. c. 109	6 August 1861
An Act to amend the Laws relating to Fisheries of Salmon in England. (Repealed by Salmon and Freshwater Fisheries Act 1923 (13 & 14 Geo. 5. c. 16))
Old Metal Dealers Act 1861 (repealed)	24 & 25 Vict. c. 110	6 August 1861
An Act for regulating the Business of Dealers in old Metals. (Repealed for England and Wales by Scrap Metal Dealers Act 1964 (c. 69))
Court of Probate (Ireland) Act 1861 (repealed)	24 & 25 Vict. c. 111	6 August 1861
An Act to amend "The Probates and Letters of Administration Act (Ireland), 1857." (Note: Probates and Letters of Administration Act (Ireland) 1857 (20 & 21 Vict. c. 79)) (Repealed by Statute Law Revision Act 1892 (55 & 56 Vict. c. 19) and Statute Law Revision Act (Northern Ireland) 1954 (c. 35 (N.I.)))
Birkenhead Enfranchisement Act 1861 or the Appropriation of Seats (Sudbury and Saint Albans) Act 1861 (repealed)	24 & 25 Vict. c. 112	6 August 1861
An Act for the Appropriation of the Seats vacated by the Disenfranchisement of the Boroughs of Sudbury and Saint Alban. (Repealed by Statute Law Revision Act 1875 (38 & 39 Vict. c. 66), Statute Law Revision Act 1878 (41 & 42 Vict. c. 79), Statute Law Revision Act 1892 (55 & 56 Vict. c. 19) and Statute Law Revision Act 1950 (14 Geo. 6. c. 6))
Industrial Schools Act 1861 (repealed)	24 & 25 Vict. c. 113	6 August 1861
An Act for amending and consolidating the Law relating to Industrial Schools. (Repealed by Industrial Schools Act 1866 (29 & 30 Vict. c. 118))
Wills Act 1861 or the Wills of Personalty by British Subjects Act 1861 or Lord Kingsdown's Act (repealed)	24 & 25 Vict. c. 114	6 August 1861
An Act to amend the Law with respect to Wills of Personal Estate made by British Subjects. (Repealed by Wills Act 1963 (c. 44))
Naval Discipline Act 1861 (repealed)	24 & 25 Vict. c. 115	6 August 1861
An Act for the Government of the Navy. (Repealed by Naval Discipline Act 1864 (27 & 28 Vict. c. 119))
Military and Naval Knights of Windsor Act 1861 (repealed)	24 & 25 Vict. c. 116	6 August 1861
An Act for the Appropriation in favour of the Military Knights and the Churches of Windsor of Two of the Canonries suspended in the Chapel of Windsor, and for making certain Provisions respecting the Naval Knights of Windsor. (Repealed by Naval Knights of Windsor (Dissolution) Act 1892 (55 & 56 Vict. c. 34))
Lace Factory Act 1861 or the Lace Factories Act 1861 (repealed)	24 & 25 Vict. c. 117	6 August 1861
An Act to place the Employment of Women, young Persons, Youths, and Children in Lace Factories under the Regulations of the Factories Act. (Note: Factories Act 1847 (10 & 11 Vict. c. 29)) (Repealed by Factory and Workshop Act 1878 (41 & 42 Vict. c. 16))
East India Loan (No. 2) Act 1861 or the East India Loan Act 1861 (repealed)	24 & 25 Vict. c. 118	6 August 1861
An Act to enable the Secretary of State in Council of India to raise Money in the United Kingdom for the Service of the Government of India. (Repealed by Statute Law Revision Act 1892 (55 & 56 Vict. c. 19))
Militia Pay Act 1861 (repealed)	24 & 25 Vict. c. 119	6 August 1861
An Act to defray the Charge of the Pay, Clothing, and contingent and other Expenses of the Disembodied Militia in Great Britain and Ireland; to grant Allowances in certain Cases to Subaltern Officers, Adjutants, Paymasters, Quartermasters, Surgeons, Assistant Surgeons, and Surgeons Mates of the Militia; and to authorize the Employment of the Non-commissioned Officers. (Repealed by Statute Law Revision Act 1875 (38 & 39 Vict. c. 66))
Militia Ballots Suspension Act 1861 (repealed)	24 & 25 Vict. c. 120	6 August 1861
An Act to suspend the making of Lists and the Ballots for the Militia of the United Kingdom. (Repealed by Statute Law Revision Act 1875 (38 & 39 Vict. c. 66))
Domicile Act 1861 (repealed)	24 & 25 Vict. c. 121	6 August 1861
An Act to amend the Law in relation to the Wills and Domicile of British Subjects dying whilst resident abroad, and of Foreign Subjects dying whilst resident within Her Majesty's Dominions. (Repealed by Statute Law Revision Act 1892 (55 & 56 Vict. c. 19), Consular Conventions Act 1949 (12, 13 & 14 Geo. 6. c. 29) and Statute Law (Repeals) Act 1971 (c. 52))
Corrupt Practices Act 1861 (repealed)	24 & 25 Vict. c. 122	6 August 1861
An Act to continue the Corrupt Practices Prevention Act (1854). (Note: Corrupt Practices Prevention Act 1854 (17 & 18 Vict. c. 102)) (Repealed by Statute Law Revision Act 1875 (38 & 39 Vict. c. 66))
Landed Estates Court (Ireland) Act 1861 (repealed)	24 & 25 Vict. c. 123	6 August 1861
An Act to reduce and alter the Rate of Duty payable on Proceedings under the Statute of the Twenty-first and Twenty-second Years of Victoria, Chapter Seventy-two, (Note: Landed Estates Court (Ireland) Act 1858 (21 & 22 Vict. c. 72)) Section Eighty-eight; and for other Purposes. (Repealed by Statute Law Revision Act 1875 (38 & 39 Vict. c. 66), Statute Law Revision Act 1892 (55 & 56 Vict. c. 19), Statute Law Revision Act 1893 (56 & 57 Vict. c. 14) and Statute Law Revision Act 1953 (2 & 3 Eliz. 2. c. 5))
Metropolitan Police (Receiver) Act 1861 or the Metropolitan Police District Receiver Act 1861 or the Metropolitan Police Act 1861	24 & 25 Vict. c. 124	6 August 1861
An Act for amending the Law relating to the Receiver of the Metropolitan Police District; and for other purposes.
Parochial Offices Act 1861 (repealed)	24 & 25 Vict. c. 125	6 August 1861
An Act to enable Overseers in populous Parishes to provide Offices for the proper Discharge of Parochial Business. (Repealed by Local Government Act 1933 (23 & 24 Geo. 5. c. 51) and London Government Act 1939 (2 & 3 Geo. 6. c. 40))
Volunteers Act 1861 (repealed)	24 & 25 Vict. c. 126	6 August 1861
An Act to exempt the Volunteer Forces of Great Britain from the Payment of Tolls. (Repealed by Volunteer Act 1863 (26 & 27 Vict. c. 65))
Treasury Chest Fund Act 1861 (repealed)	24 & 25 Vict. c. 127	6 August 1861
An Act for limiting and regulating the Treasury Chest Fund. (Repealed by Treasury Chest Fund Act 1877 (40 & 41 Vict. c. 45))
Local Government Supplemental Act 1861 (No. 2) or the Local Government Supplemental (No. 2) Act 1861	24 & 25 Vict. c. 128	6 August 1861
An Act to confirm certain Provisional Orders under the Local Government Act (1858), relating to the Districts of Plymouth, Weston-super-Mare, Llanelly, and Llandilo; and for other Purposes in relation thereto.
	Provisional Order putting in force the Lands Clauses Consolidation Act, 1845, within the District of the Plymouth Local Board of Health, for the Purchase of Lands by the said Board for Street Improvements.	
	Provisional Order repealing and altering Local Acts in force within the District of Weston-super-Mare, consolidating certain Debts incurred under such Acts, and altering the Powers of Rating within the said District.	
	Provisional Order for altering the Boundaries of the District of Weston-super-Mare, in the County of Somerset, as constituted under the Local Government Act, 1858.	
	Provisional Order for extending the Borrowing Powers of the Llanelly Local Board of Health.	
	Provisional Order for extending the Borrowing Powers of the Llandilo Local Board.	
Officers of Reserve to the Navy Act 1861 (repealed)	24 & 25 Vict. c. 129	6 August 1861
An Act to enable Her Majesty to accept the Services of Officers of the Merchant Service as Officers of Reserve to the Royal Navy. (Repealed by Officers of Royal Naval Reserve Act 1863 (26 & 27 Vict. c. 69))
Gunpowder and Fireworks Act 1861 (repealed)	24 & 25 Vict. c. 130	6 August 1861
An Act for amending an Act passed in the last Session of Parliament (Note: Gunpowder Act 1860 (23 & 24 Vict. c. 139)) to amend the Law concerning the making, keeping, and Carriage of Gunpowder and Compositions of an explosive Nature, and concerning the Manufacture, Sale, and Use of Fireworks. (Repealed by Explosives Act 1875 (38 & 39 Vict. c. 17))
Episcopal and Capitular Estates Act 1861 or the Archdeaconry of Rochester Act 1861	24 & 25 Vict. c. 131	6 August 1861
An Act to continue the Act (Note: Episcopal and Capitular Estates Act 1857 (20 & 21 Vict. c. 74)) concerning the Management of Episcopal and Capitular Estates in England, and further to amend certain Acts relating to the Ecclesiastical Commissioners for England.
Industrial Schools (Scotland) Act 1861 (repealed)	24 & 25 Vict. c. 132	6 August 1861
An Act for consolidating and amending the Law relating to Industrial Schools in Scotland. (Repealed by Industrial Schools Act 1866 (29 & 30 Vict. c. 118))
Land Drainage Act 1861 (repealed)	24 & 25 Vict. c. 133	6 August 1861
An Act to amend the Law relating to the Drainage of Land for Agricultural Purposes. (Repealed by Land Drainage Act 1930 (20 & 21 Geo. 5. c. 44))
Bankruptcy Act 1861 (repealed)	24 & 25 Vict. c. 134	6 August 1861
An Act to amend the Law relating to Bankruptcy and Insolvency in England. (Repealed by Bankruptcy Repeal and Insolvent Court Act 1869 (32 & 33 Vict. c. 83))

=== Local acts ===
Short title	Citation	Royal assent
Long title
Edenfield Chapel and Little Bolton Turnpike Trusts Continuance Act 1861 (repealed)	24 & 25 Vict. c. i	17 May 1861
An Act to repeal the Act of the Third Year of the Reign of Her present Majesty, entitled "An Act for more effectually repairing and improving the Road from Edenfield Chapel to Little Bolton and certain Branch Roads connected therewith, all in the County Palatine of Lancaster;" (Note: Road from Edenfield Chapel to Little Bolton (Lancashire) Act 1839 (2 & 3 Vict. c. xlvii)) and to confer other Powers in lieu thereof. (Repealed by Annual Turnpike Acts Continuance Act 1876 (39 & 40 Vict. c. 39))
Bristol and South Wales Union Railway Act 1861	24 & 25 Vict. c. ii	17 May 1861
An Act to grant further Powers to the Bristol and South Wales Union Railway Company with reference to their Capital and Borrowing Powers; to extend the Periods limited for Completion of the Works; to amend the Act (Note: Bristol and South Wales Union Act 1857 (20 & 21 Vict. c. liv)) relating to the Company; and for other Purposes.
City of Dublin Steam Packet Company's (Consolidation of Shares) Act 1861 (repealed)	24 & 25 Vict. c. iii	17 May 1861
An Act to consolidate the Capital Stock or Shares of "The City of Dublin Steam Packet Company;" and for other Purposes. (Repealed by Statute Law (Repeals) Act 2013 (c. 2))
Wallasey Improvement Act 1861	24 & 25 Vict. c. iv	17 May 1861
An Act for conferring on the Local Board of Health for the District of Wallasey further Powers for raising Money; for the Acquisition of Seacombe Ferry; and for incorporating the said Board; and for other Purposes.
Biddenden Turnpike Trust Act 1861	24 & 25 Vict. c. v	17 May 1861
An Act to continue the Biddenden Turnpike Trust in the County of Kent; and for other Purposes.
Gainsburgh Bridge to East Retford and to Gringley-on-the-Hill Roads Act 1861	24 & 25 Vict. c. vi	17 May 1861
An Act to repeal the Act (Note: Roads from Gainsborough Bridge (Lincolnshire, Nottinghamshire) Act 1830 (11 Geo. 4 & 1 Will. 4. c. xxv)) for more effectually repairing and improving the Road from the West End of Gainsburgh Bridge to East Retford and to Gringley-on-the-Hill in the County of Nottingham, and to make other Provisions in lieu thereof.
Preston Corporation Markets Act 1861	24 & 25 Vict. c. vii	17 May 1861
An Act for authorizing the Corporation of the Borough of Preston to establish and regulate Markets and Fairs, to erect a Town Hall, an Exchange, and Public Offices, and make new Streets in Preston; and for other Purposes.
Inverness and Aberdeen Junction Railway Act 1861 (repealed)	24 & 25 Vict. c. viii	17 May 1861
An Act to authorize the Consolidation into One Undertaking of the Inverness and Nairn and Inverness and Aberdeen Junction Railways, and the Union into One Company of the Two Companies to which the said Railways respectively belong. (Repealed by Highland Railway Act 1865 (28 & 29 Vict. c. clxviii))
Blackpool and Lytham Railway Act 1861	24 & 25 Vict. c. ix	17 May 1861
An Act for making a Railway from Blackpool in the County of Lancaster to Lytham in the same County.
Brecon and Merthyr Railway (Capital) Act 1861	24 & 25 Vict. c. x	17 May 1861
An Act to enable the Brecon and Merthyr Tydfil Junction Railway Company to raise additional Money; and for other Purposes.
Dublin, Wicklow and Wexford Railway Act 1861	24 & 25 Vict. c. xi	17 May 1861
An Act to enable the Dublin, Wicklow, and Wexford Railway Company to make a Deviation in their authorized Railway; and for other Purposes.
South Eastern Railway (Capital Arrangements) Act 1861	24 & 25 Vict. c. xii	17 May 1861
An Act to enable the South-eastern Railway Company to raise a further Sum of Money, and to increase their Subscription to the Undertaking of the Charing Cross Railway Company.
Shrewsbury and Welchpool Railway Act 1861 or the Shrewsbury and Welshpool Railway Act 1861	24 & 25 Vict. c. xiii	17 May 1861
An Act to authorize the Shrewsbury and Welchpool Railway Company to widen their Minsterley Branch; and for other Purposes.
Clifton and Durdham Downs (Bristol) Act 1861 or the Clifton and Durdham Downs Act 1861	24 & 25 Vict. c. xiv	17 May 1861
An Act to enable the Corporation of the City of Bristol to purchase Durdham Down, and to secure Durdham Down and Clifton Down as Places for public Recreation.
Exeter and Exmouth Railway Act 1861	24 & 25 Vict. c. xv	17 May 1861
An Act for enabling the Exeter and Exmouth Railway Company to regulate their Capital, to raise further Capital; and for other Purposes connected with their Undertaking.
Strathspey Railway Act 1861	24 & 25 Vict. c. xvi	17 May 1861
An Act to authorize the making of a Railway in Scotland, to be called the Strathspey Railway.
Oswestry and Newton Railway (Llanfyllin and Kerry Branches) Act 1861	24 & 25 Vict. c. xvii	17 May 1861
An Act to enable the Oswestry and Newtown Railway Company to construct additional Lines of Railway to Llanfyllin and Kerry in the County of Montgomery; and for other Purposes.
Inverness and Aberdeen Junction Railway (Branch) Act 1861	24 & 25 Vict. c. xviii	17 May 1861
An Act to enable the Inverness and Aberdeen Junction Railway Company to construct a Branch Railway from their Alves Station to the Town and Harbour of Burghead; to provide additional Station Accommodation at Inverness; and for other Purposes.
Tiverton Roads Act 1861	24 & 25 Vict. c. xix	17 May 1861
An Act to repeal an Act of the Eleventh Year of the Reign of King George the Fourth, (Note: Tiverton Roads Act 1830 (11 Geo. 4 & 1 Will. 4. c. xcvii)) for improving several Roads and making certain new Roads in the Counties of Devon and Somerset leading to and from the Town of Tiverton, and for amending an Act of His present Majesty (Note: Wiveliscombe Roads Act 1825 (6 Geo. 4. c. xciii)) for repairing several Roads leading from and through the Town of Wiveliscombe; and to make other Provisions in lieu thereof.
Elton and Blackburn Roads Act 1861	24 & 25 Vict. c. xx	17 May 1861
An Act to repeal an Act passed in the Tenth Year of the Reign of King George the Fourth, intituled "An Act for repairing, improving, and maintaining in repair the Road from Brandlesome Moss Gate in the Township of Elton to the Duke of York Public House in the Township of Blackburn, and a Branch Road therefrom, all in the County Palatine of Lancaster;" (Note: Road from Elton to Blackburn Act 1829 (10 Geo. 4. c. iii)) and to make other Provisions in lieu thereof.
Borough of Portsmouth Waterworks Act 1861	24 & 25 Vict. c. xxi	17 May 1861
An Act to enable the Borough of Portsmouth Waterworks Company to raise further Money; and for other Purposes.
Witney Railway Act 1861	24 & 25 Vict. c. xxii	17 May 1861
An Act to enable the Witney Railway Company to make a Road to their Station at Witney; and for other Purposes.
South Shields Improvement Amendment Act 1861	24 & 25 Vict. c. xxiii	17 May 1861
An Act to enable the Mayor, Aldermen, and Burgesses of South Shields to maintain a Quay there; and for other Purposes.
Clitheroe Gas Act 1861	24 & 25 Vict. c. xxiv	17 May 1861
An Act for incorporating the Clitheroe Gaslight Company; for the Regulation of their Capital; and for other Purposes.
Oldham and Ripponden Roads Act 1861	24 & 25 Vict. c. xxv	17 May 1861
An Act to repeal An Act (Note: Road from Oldham to Ripponden (Yorkshire) Act 1829 (10 Geo. 4. c. lxxxix)) for more effectually amending the Road from Oldham in the County of Lancaster to Ripponden in the County of York, and other Roads in the same Counties, and for making and maintaining a new Branch to communicate therewith, and to make other Provisions in lieu thereof, so far as regards the said Road from Oldham to Ripponden, and the other Roads already made in connexion therewith.
Kendal Fell Act 1861	24 & 25 Vict. c. xxvi	17 May 1861
An Act to repeal the Act of the 7th Year of His late Majesty King George III., Chapter 111., (Note: Kendal Fell Act 1767 (7 Geo. 3. c. 111 Pr.)) and to make better Provision for the managing of certain Lands in the County of Westmoreland called Kendal Fell Lands.
Kingston and Leatherhead Turnpike Road Act 1861 (repealed)	24 & 25 Vict. c. xxvii	17 May 1861
An Act for extending the Term and amending the Provisions of the Act (Note: Road from Kingston-upon-Thames to Leatherhead Act 1825 (6 Geo. 4. c. xlvi)) relating to the Kingston-upon-Thames and Leatherhead Turnpike Road in the County of Surrey. (Repealed by Statute Law (Repeals) Act 2013 (c. 2))
Bradford, Wakefield and Leeds Railway Act 1861	24 & 25 Vict. c. xxviii	17 May 1861
An Act to empower the Bradford, Wakefield, and Leeds Railway Company to construct a Railway from Ossett to join the London and North-western Railway at or near Batley, all in the West Riding of the County of York; and for other Purposes.
Kilrush and Kilkee Railway and Poulnasherry Reclamation Amendment Act 1861	24 & 25 Vict. c. xxix	17 May 1861
An Act to divert certain Portions of the Railway from Kilrush to Kilkee, and to deepen and improve the Creek or Harbour of Kilrush.
Morayshire Railway Act 1861	24 & 25 Vict. c. xxx	17 May 1861
An Act to enable the Morayshire Railway Company to extend their Railway to the Strathspey Railway; and for other Purposes.
Stratford-upon-Avon Railway Act 1861	24 & 25 Vict. c. xxxi	17 May 1861
An Act for authorizing the Stratford-upon-Avon Railway Company to raise additional Capital; and for other Purposes.
Wrexham and Minera Railway Act 1861	24 & 25 Vict. c. xxxii	17 May 1861
An Act for making a Railway from Wrexham to Minera, and for other Purposes.
Dewsbury, Batley and Heckmondwike Waterworks Amendment Act 1861 (repealed)	24 & 25 Vict. c. xxxiii	17 May 1861
An Act to amend "The Dewsbury, Batley, and Heckmondwike Waterworks Act, 1856;" (Note: Dewsbury, Batley and Heckmondwike Waterworks Act 1856 (19 & 20 Vict. c. xxxvi)) and to authorize the Construction of new Works; and for other Purposes. (Repealed by Dewsbury and Heckmondwike Waterworks Act 1876 (39 & 40 Vict. c. clxxxv))
Lancashire and Yorkshire Railway (Bootle Branch, &c.) Act 1861	24 & 25 Vict. c. xxxiv	17 May 1861
An Act to enable the Lancashire and Yorkshire Railway Company to make a Railway from Aintree to Bootle, with certain Branch Railways, all in Lancashire; and for other Purposes relating to the same Company.
Garston and Liverpool Railway Act 1861	24 & 25 Vict. c. xxxv	17 May 1861
An Act to authorize the Construction of a Railway between Garston and Liverpool, and for other Purposes.
Great Western Railway (Capital) Act 1861	24 & 25 Vict. c. xxxvi	17 May 1861
An Act to define and increase the Capital of the Great Western Railway Company, and for other Purposes.
Lancashire and Yorkshire Railway (Capital) Act 1861	24 & 25 Vict. c. xxxvii	17 May 1861
An Act to enable the Lancashire and Yorkshire Railway Company to raise a further Sum of Money; and for other Purposes.
Price's Patent Candle Company's Act 1861 (repealed)	24 & 25 Vict. c. xxxviii	17 May 1861
An Act to continue the existing Borrowing Power of Prices Patent Candle Company (Limited). (Repealed by Price's Patent Candle Company Limited Act 1920 (10 & 11 Geo. 5. c. iv))
Haslingden Gasworks Act 1861 (repealed)	24 & 25 Vict. c. xxxix	7 June 1861
An Act for lighting with Gas the Town and Neighbourhood of Haslingden in Lancashire. (Repealed by County of Lancashire Act 1984 (c. xxi))
Northern Assurance Amendment Act 1861 (repealed)	24 & 25 Vict. c. xl	7 June 1861
An Act to amend an Act passed in the Session of Parliament holden in the 11th and 12th Years of the Reign of Her Majesty Queen Victoria, intituled "An Act for incorporating the North of Scotland Fire and Life Assurance Company, under the Name of the Northern Assurance Company; for enabling the said Company to sue and be sued, and to take, hold, and transfer Property; for confirming the Rules and Regulations of the said Company; and for other Purposes relating thereto;" (Note: Northern Assurance Company Act 1848 (11 & 12 Vict. c. xlvi)) and to vary, extend, and enlarge certain of the Powers of the said Company; and for other Purposes relating to the said Company. (Repealed by Northern Assurance Act 1865 (28 & 29 Vict. c. cxxiii))
Swansea Gas Act 1861	24 & 25 Vict. c. xli	7 June 1861
An Act for better lighting with Gas the Borough of Swansea and the Neighbourhood thereof.
Liverpool Improvement Act 1861 (repealed)	24 & 25 Vict. c. xlii	7 June 1861
An Act for enabling the Mayor, Aldermen, and Burgesses of the Borough of Liverpool to make new and widen existing Streets within the Borough; and for other Purposes. (Repealed by Liverpool Corporation Act 1921 (11 & 12 Geo. 5. c. lxxiv))
Newcastle-under-Lyme Marsh Lands Act 1861 (repealed)	24 & 25 Vict. c. xliii	7 June 1861
An Act to amend and extend the Acts relating to the Newcastle-under-Lyme Marsh Lands; to incorporate the Trustees under the said Acts; and for other Purposes. (Repealed by Staffordshire Act 1983 (c. xviii))
Nantwich and Market Drayton Railway Act 1861	24 & 25 Vict. c. xliv	7 June 1861
An Act for making a Railway from the London and North-western Railway at Nantwich in the County of Chester to Market Drayton in the County of Salop.
Neath Water Supply Act 1861 (repealed)	24 & 25 Vict. c. xlv	7 June 1861
An Act for better supplying with Water the Borough of Neath and the adjacent District in the County of Glamorgan. (Repealed by West Glamorgan Water Board Order 1966 (SI 1966/1096))
Dartmouth and Torbay Railway Act 1861	24 & 25 Vict. c. xlvi	7 June 1861
An Act for authorizing the Dartmouth and Torbay Railway Company to raise further Monies; and for other Purposes.
Northampton Waterworks Act 1861 (repealed)	24 & 25 Vict. c. xlvii	7 June 1861
An Act to incorporate the Northampton Waterworks Company; to enable them to better supply the Town of Northampton and the several Townships and Places adjacent thereto with Water; and for other Purposes. (Repealed by Mid-Northamptonshire Water Board Order Confirmation (Special Procedure) Act 1949 (12, 13 & 14 Geo. 6. c. ix))
Baggymoor Drainage Act 1861	24 & 25 Vict. c. xlviii	7 June 1861
An Act for the better Drainage and Improvement of certain Low Lands and Grounds, formerly Common, within the Manors of Baschurch, Hordley, Stanwardine-in-the-Wood, Weston Lullingfield, and Stanwardine-in-the-Fields, and of certain other Lands adjoining or near thereto, all situate in the County of Salop.
Kilkenny Markets Act 1861	24 & 25 Vict. c. xlix	7 June 1861
An Act to authorize the Mayor, Aldermen, and Burgesses of Kilkenny to make a General Market in the City of Kilkenny; and for other Purposes.
Lancashire and Yorkshire Railway (Dewsbury, &c. Branches) Act 1861	24 & 25 Vict. c. l	7 June 1861
An Act to enable the Lancashire and Yorkshire Railway Company to construct Branch Railways to Dewsbury, Heckmandwike, and Meltham; to purchase additional Lands at Rochdale and Miles Platting; and for other Purposes.
Llantrissant and Taff Vale Junction Railway Act 1861	24 & 25 Vict. c. li	7 June 1861
An Act for making a Railway from the Taff Vale Railway in the Parish of Lantwit Vardre in the County of Glamorgan to Llantrissant in the same County, with Branches therefrom, to be called "The Llantrissant and Taff Vale Junction Railway;" and for other Purposes.
Newgate Market Abolition Act 1861	24 & 25 Vict. c. lii	7 June 1861
An Act to abolish and dismarket Newgate Market in the City of London, and to facilitate the Removal of Shambles and Slaughter-houses and other Nuisances and Obstructions in the Vicinity of the said Market, and to authorize the Erection of Dwelling Houses or Shops or other Buildings on the Site thereof; and for other Purposes.
Uxbridge Gas Act 1861 (repealed)	24 & 25 Vict. c. liii	7 June 1861
An Act to incorporate a Company for supplying Gas to Uxbridge and certain Places in the Neighbourhood of the same. (Repealed by Statute Law (Repeals) Act 2013 (c. 2))
West Cornwall Railway Amendment Act 1861	24 & 25 Vict. c. liv	7 June 1861
An Act for enabling the West Cornwall Railway Company to create Debenture Stock; and for other Purposes.
Isle of Wight Waterworks Act 1861	24 & 25 Vict. c. lv	7 June 1861
An Act for better supplying with Water Sandown, Lake, Shanklin, Brading, Newchurch, Ryde, and other Places in the Parishes of Brading, Shanklin, and Newchurch, and the several Parishes and Places adjacent thereto, in the Isle of Wight and County of Southampton; and for other Purposes.
Huddersfield Gas Act 1861	24 & 25 Vict. c. lvi	7 June 1861
An Act for dissolving and re-incorporating the Huddersfield Registered Gaslight Company, and for conferring upon them further Powers for the Supply of Gas to the Borough of Huddersfield, and certain neighbouring Townships and Places.
Midland Railway (New Lines) Act 1861	24 & 25 Vict. c. lvii	7 June 1861
An Act to enable the Midland Railway Company to make new Railways; and for other Purposes.
Ryde Water Act 1861	24 & 25 Vict. c. lviii	7 June 1861
An Act to enable the Ryde Commissioners to better supply with Water the Town of Ryde and the Places adjacent thereto, in the Isle of Wight; and for other Purposes.
Berwick, Norham and Islandshires Turnpike Trust Act 1861	24 & 25 Vict. c. lix	7 June 1861
An Act for maintaining certain Roads and Bridges in the County of the Borough and Town of Berwick-upon-Tweed and Counties of Northumberland and Berwick, and for the Liquidation of the Debt due on the Security of the Tolls taken on the said Roads and Bridges.
Leeds, Bradford and Halifax Junction Railway Act 1861	24 & 25 Vict. c. lx	7 June 1861
An Act to authorize the Leeds, Bradford, and Halifax Junction Railway Company to construct a Branch Railway to join the Birstal Branch of the London and North-western Railway at Batley in the West Riding of the County of York; and for other Purposes.
Universal Private Telegraph Company's Act 1861	24 & 25 Vict. c. lxi	7 June 1861
An Act for incorporating the Universal Private Telegraph Company, and to enable the said Company to work certain Letters Patent.
Whitehaven, Cleator and Egremont Railway Act 1861	24 & 25 Vict. c. lxii	7 June 1861
An Act to enable the Whitehaven, Cleator, and Egremont Railway Company to extend their Railway from Frizington to Lamplugh in the County of Cumberland; to widen and enlarge their present Railway and Works; to raise further Capital; and for other Purposes.
Stockton and Darlington Railway (Works) Act 1861	24 & 25 Vict. c. lxiii	12 June 1861
An Act for authorizing the Stockton and Darlington Railway Company to make and maintain a new Branch Railway, and to abandon the making of one of their authorized Branch Railways; and for other Purposes.
Belfast and County Down Railway (Bangor Branch Abandonment) Act 1861	24 & 25 Vict. c. lxiv	12 June 1861
An Act to authorize the entire Abandonment of the Bangor Branch of the Belfast and County Down Railway.
Mid-Wales Railway Act 1861	24 & 25 Vict. c. lxv	12 June 1861
An Act to enable the Mid-Wales Railway Company to make a Deviation in their authorized Railway; and for other Purposes.
Manchester London Road Station Enlargement Act 1861	24 & 25 Vict. c. lxvi	12 June 1861
An Act for the Enlargement and Regulation of the Manchester London Road Station, and for other Purposes.
Great Northern and Western (of Ireland) Railway Act 1861	24 & 25 Vict. c. lxvii	12 June 1861
An Act to enable the Great Northern and Western (of Ireland) Railway Company to extend their Railway to Westport; and for other Purposes.
Elland Gas Act 1861 (repealed)	24 & 25 Vict. c. lxviii	12 June 1861
An Act for supplying with Gas the Township of Elland-cum-Greetland and adjacent Places in the Parish of Halifax in the West Riding of the County of York, and for other Purposes. (Repealed by West Yorkshire Act 1980 (c. xiv))
Portadown, Dungannon and Omagh Junction Railway Act 1861	24 & 25 Vict. c. lxix	12 June 1861
An Act to enable the Portadown, Dungannon, and Omagh Junction Railway Company to make a Branch Railway to Aughnacloy in the County of Tyrone; to amend the Acts relating to the Railway; and for other Purposes.
Great Northern Railway Act 1861	24 & 25 Vict. c. lxx	12 June 1861
An Act to vest in the Great Northern Railway Company the Hertford, Luton, and Dunstable Railway, and for other Purposes relating to the same Company.
Mr. Sneyd's Railway Act 1861	24 & 25 Vict. c. lxxi	28 June 1861
An Act to authorize the Construction of Bridges over Highways and Arches under a Turnpike Road and Highways in the Parishes of Wolstanton and Audley in the County of Stafford, and for other Purposes.
Frosterly and Stanhope Railway Act 1861	24 & 25 Vict. c. lxxii	28 June 1861
An Act to authorize the making of a Railway from the Stockton and Darlington Railway at or near the Frosterly Station to Newlandside near Stanhope, with a Road Approach from Stanhope, all in the County of Durham; and for authorizing Working Arrangements with the Stockton and Darlington Railway Company; and for other Purposes.
Uxbridge and Rickmansworth Railway Act 1861 (repealed)	24 & 25 Vict. c. lxxiii	28 June 1861
An Act for making a Railway from Uxbridge in the County of Middlesex to Rickmansworth in the County of Hertford, with a Branch to Scott's Bridge Mill, to be called "The Uxbridge and Rickmansworth Railway," and for other Purposes. (Repealed by Statute Law (Repeals) Act 2013 (c. 2))
Birmingham Canal Navigations Act 1861	24 & 25 Vict. c. lxxiv	28 June 1861
An Act for enabling the Company of Proprietors of the Birmingham Canal Navigations to raise further Money; and for other Purposes.
Manchester and Wilmslow Turnpike Roads Act 1861 (repealed)	24 & 25 Vict. c. lxxv	28 June 1861
An Act for the Manchester and Wilmslow Turnpike Roads in the Counties Palatine of Lancaster and Chester. (Repealed by Annual Turnpike Acts Continuance Act 1881 (44 & 45 Vict. c. 31))
Henley-in-Arden Railway Act 1861	24 & 25 Vict. c. lxxvi	28 June 1861
An Act for making and maintaining of the Henley-in-Arden Railway, and for other Purposes.
Darlington Local Board Act 1861	24 & 25 Vict. c. lxxvii	28 June 1861
An Act to enable the Local Board of Health for the Township of Darlington to supply Gas and Water in the adjoining Townships of Cockerton, Blackwell, Whessoe, and Haughton-le-Skerne; to enlarge Market Place, erect a covered Market, make and improve Roads; to vest in the Local Board all the Powers of the Burial Board; to raise additional Money; to levy and alter Tolls and Rates; and amend Acts relating to the Local Board; and for other Purposes.
Thorne Moor Improvement Act 1861	24 & 25 Vict. c. lxxviii	28 June 1861
An Act to make further Provision for the Draining, Warping, and Improvement of Thorne Moor in the West Riding of Yorkshire.
Hull Docks Act 1861	24 & 25 Vict. c. lxxix	28 June 1861
An Act for authorizing the Dock Company at Kingston-upon-Hull to make and maintain an additional Dock at Kingston-upon-Hull (to be called the Western Dock), and a Railway to connect the same with the Hull and Selby Railway; to alter a Part of the Line of the Hull and Selby Railway, and to construct other Works at Kingston-upon-Hull; for amending the Acts relating to the Company; for granting more effectual Powers for the Regulation and Management of their Docks; and for other Purposes.
Sowerby Bridge Gas Act 1861 (repealed)	24 & 25 Vict. c. lxxx	28 June 1861
An Act for incorporating the Sowerby Bridge Gas Company; for enabling the Company to raise further Capital; for better supplying Sowerby Bridge and the Neighbourhood thereof with Gas; and for authorizing the Sale of the Undertaking of that Company, and also of the Rights and Powers of the Sowerby Bridge Gas Consumers Company (Limited); and for other Purposes. (Repealed by West Yorkshire Act 1980 (c. xiv))
Victoria Station and Pimlico Railway Act 1861	24 & 25 Vict. c. lxxxi	28 June 1861
An Act to grant further Powers to the Victoria Station and Pimlico Railway Company, with reference to their Share and Loan Capital; and to sanction certain Agreements with the Great Western and London, Chatham, and Dover Railway Companies; and for other Purposes.
Rhyl Bridge Act 1861 (repealed)	24 & 25 Vict. c. lxxxii	28 June 1861
An Act to authorize the Construction of a Bridge across the River Clwyd, to be called "The Rhyl Bridge." (Repealed by Clwyd County Council Act 1985 (c. xliv))
Workington Dock Act 1861 (repealed)	24 & 25 Vict. c. lxxxiii	28 June 1861
An Act to enable the Bight Honourable William Earl of Lonsdale to make and maintain a Dock or Tidal Basin at Workington in the County of Cumberland, and a Railway therefrom to join the Whitehaven Junction Railway; and for other Purposes. (Repealed by Workington Harbour and Dock (Transfer) Act 1957 (5 & 6 Eliz. 2. c. xxxii))
Edinburgh and Glasgow Railway Amendment Act 1861	24 & 25 Vict. c. lxxxiv	28 June 1861
An Act to enable the Edinburgh and Glasgow Railway Company to raise additional Capital.
Scottish Widows' Fund and Life Assurance Society's Incorporation Act 1861 (repealed)	24 & 25 Vict. c. lxxxv	28 June 1861
An Act for incorporating the Scottish Widows Fund and Life Assurance Society, and for other Purposes relating thereto. (Repealed by Scottish Widows' Fund and Life Assurance Society's Act 1926 (16 & 17 Geo. 5. c. lxxviii))
Manchester, Sheffield and Lincolnshire Railway (Additional Works) Act 1861	24 & 25 Vict. c. lxxxvi	28 June 1861
An Act to enable the Manchester, Sheffield, and Lincolnshire Railway Company to make new Railways in the Counties of Derby and Lincoln; to improve their Station at Ardwick; and for other Purposes.
Wycombe Railway (Extensions to Oxford and Aylesbury) Act 1861	24 & 25 Vict. c. lxxxvii	28 June 1861
An Act to authorize the Wycombe Railway Company to extend their Railway to Aylesbury and to Oxford; and for other Purposes.
Leeds and Ealand Road Act 1861	24 & 25 Vict. c. lxxxviii	28 June 1861
An Act to repeal an Act passed in the Seventh and Eighth Years of the Reign of His Majesty King George the Fourth, intituled "An Act for repairing the Road leading from Ealand to the Town of Leeds in the West Riding of the County of York;" (Note: Road from Ealand to Leeds Act 1827 (7 & 8 Geo. 4. c. Road from Ealand to Leeds Act 1827)) and granting more effectual Powers in lieu thereof.
Banbridge Extension Railway Act 1861	24 & 25 Vict. c. lxxxix	28 June 1861
An Act for making a Railway from Banbridge to Ballyroney, with a Branch Railway therefrom to Rathfriland, to be called "The Banbridge Extension Railway," and for other Purposes.
Llanidloes and Newtown Railway Act 1861	24 & 25 Vict. c. xc	28 June 1861
An Act to revive the Powers for the Purchase of Lands, and to extend the Time for the Completion of Works authorized by the "Llanidloes and Newtown Railway (Canal Extension) Act, 1859," (Note: Llanidloes and Newtown Railway (Canal Extension) Act 1859 (22 & 23 Vict. c. xxx)) and to authorize the Llanidloes and Newtown Railway Company to raise additional Capital; and for other Purposes.
Tyne Improvement Act 1861	24 & 25 Vict. c. xci	28 June 1861
An Act to amend the Acts relating to the River Tyne; and to enable the Tyne Improvement Commissioners to construct Docks and other Works, and to remove and rebuild the Bridge of Newcastle-upon-Tyne; to make certain Alterations in the Rates charged by the Commissioners; and for other Purposes.
Bonelli's Electric Telegraph Act 1861	24 & 25 Vict. c. xcii	28 June 1861
An Act to empower Bonelli's Electric Telegraph Company (Limited) to acquire and work Letters Patent relating to Electric Telegraphs; and for other Purposes.
Charing Cross Railway (City Terminus) Act 1861	24 & 25 Vict. c. xciii	28 June 1861
An Act for authorizing the Charing Cross Railway to make a Line of Railway from their authorized Line into the City of London, with an additional Line in Southwark, and to raise further Monies; and for other Purposes.
Dewsbury and Batley Gas Act 1861 (repealed)	24 & 25 Vict. c. xciv	28 June 1861
An Act to extend the Limits of the Dewsbury and Batley Gas Company to Part of the Township of Thornhill; to authorize the said Company to raise more Money; to amend their Act; (Note: Dewsbury and Batley Gas Act 1851 (14 & 15 Vict. c. iv)) and for other Purposes. (Repealed by West Yorkshire Act 1980 (c. xiv))
Burton-upon-Trent Water Act 1861	24 & 25 Vict. c. xcv	28 June 1861
An Act for the Incorporation of the Burton-upon-Trent Waterworks Company, and for authorizing them to supply with Water the Town of Burton-upon-Trent and the Township of Barton-under-Needwood and the Neighbourhoods thereof; and for other Purposes.
Dunblane, Doune and Callander Railway (Amendment) Act 1861	24 & 25 Vict. c. xcvi	28 June 1861
An Act to enable the Dunblane, Doune, and Callander Railway Company to create Preference Shares; and for other Purposes.
Whitworth Vale Gas Act 1861	24 & 25 Vict. c. xcvii	28 June 1861
An Act for incorporating the Whitworth Vale Gas Company (Limited), and extending their Powers, and for other Purposes.
Blyth and Tyne Railway Amendment Act 1861	24 & 25 Vict. c. xcviii	28 June 1861
An Act to enable the Blyth and Tyne Railway Company to make a Railway from their Main Line of Railway to Newcastle-upon-Tyne and certain Branch Railways in the County of Northumberland; to grant further Powers to the Company; to amend the Acts relating to the Company; and for other Purposes.
Limerick and Foynes Railway Act 1861	24 & 25 Vict. c. xcix	28 June 1861
An Act to enable the Limerick and Foynes Railway Company to raise further Sums.
Middleton and Tonge Improvement Act 1861	24 & 25 Vict. c. c	28 June 1861
An Act for paving, draining, cleansing, lighting, and otherwise improving the District comprised within the Boundaries of the Township of Middleton in the Parish of Middleton, and the Township of Tonge in the Parish of Prestwich-cum-Oldham, both in the County of Lancaster; and for other Purposes.
Lancashire and Yorkshire Railway (Salford to Victoria Station) Act 1861	24 & 25 Vict. c. ci	28 June 1861
An Act to enable the Lancashire and Yorkshire Railway Company to make a Railway between Salford and the Victoria Station at Manchester; and for other Purposes relating to the same Company.
North British (Galashiels and Peebles) Railway Act 1861	24 & 25 Vict. c. cii	28 June 1861
An Act for making a Railway from the Hawick Line of the North British Railway near Galashiels to Peebles, and for other Purposes.
Bishop's Castle Railway Act 1861	24 & 25 Vict. c. ciii	28 June 1861
An Act for making Railways from the Oswestry and Newtown Railway near Montgomery to Bishops Castle and other Places in the County of Salop.
Liverpool Burial Board Act 1861	24 & 25 Vict. c. civ	28 June 1861
An Act to enable the Burial Board of the Parish of Liverpool to acquire certain Lands at Walton-on-the-Hill in Lancashire.
Kingstown Waterworks Act 1861	24 & 25 Vict. c. cv	28 June 1861
An Act to enable the Kingstown Waterworks Company to abandon a Portion of their authorized Works, and to construct and maintain other Works; and for other Purposes.
Midland Railway (Additional Powers) Act 1861	24 & 25 Vict. c. cvi	28 June 1861
An Act for enabling the Midland Railway Company to construct Works and to acquire additional Lands in the Counties of Derby, Lancaster, Nottingham, Warwick, and Gloucester, and the West Riding of the County of York; for vesting in them the Undertaking of the Dursley and Midland Junction Railway Company; and for other Purposes.
Cork and Youghal Railway Act 1861	24 & 25 Vict. c. cvii	28 June 1861
An Act to authorize the Cork and Youghal Railway Company to extend their Railway in Youghal; and to amend the Acts relating to the Company.
East India Irrigation and Canal Act 1861	24 & 25 Vict. c. cviii	28 June 1861
An Act for incorporating "The East India Irrigation and Canal Company," and for other Purposes connected therewith.
Leigh District Gas Act 1861	24 & 25 Vict. c. cix	28 June 1861
An Act for better supplying with Gas the Townships of Atherton, Bedford. Pennington, Tyldesley-cum-Shackerley, West Leigh, and other Places in the County of Lancaster.
London and North Western Railway (Cheshire Lines) Act 1861	24 & 25 Vict. c. cx	28 June 1861
An Act for enabling the London and North-western Railway Company to construct new Railways from near Stockport to Northenden Road near Cheadle, and from Chelford to Knutsford, with Branches therefrom respectively; and for other Purposes.
Alton, Alresford and Winchester Railway Act 1861	24 & 25 Vict. c. cxi	28 June 1861
An Act for making Railways between the London and South-western Railway at Alton, Alresford, and the Railway of the London and South-western Railway Company near to Winchester, and for other Purposes.
Clifton Suspension Bridge Act 1861 (repealed)	24 & 25 Vict. c. cxii	28 June 1861
An Act for erecting a Suspension Bridge from Clifton in the City and County of Bristol to the Parish of Long Ashton in the County of Somerset. (Repealed by Clifton Suspension Bridge Act 1952 (15 & 16 Geo. 6 & 1 Eliz. 2. c. xli))
Cheshire Midland Railway Act 1861	24 & 25 Vict. c. cxiii	11 July 1861
An Act for authorizing the Cheshire Midland Railway Company to make a Deviation of their authorized Line of Railway; and for authorizing Working and other Arrangements between them and the Manchester, Sheffield, and Lincolnshire Railway Company; and for other Purposes.
North British Peebles Railway (Lease) Act 1861	24 & 25 Vict. c. cxiv	11 July 1861
An Act to provide for the leasing of the Peebles Railway to the North British Railway Company.
Shireoaks District Church Act 1861	24 & 25 Vict. c. cxv	11 July 1861
An Act for the building of a new Church in the Township of Shireoaks in the Parish of Worksop in the County of Nottingham; and for other Purposes.
Weston-super-Mare Gaslight Act 1861	24 & 25 Vict. c. cxvi	11 July 1861
An Act for granting further Powers to the Weston-super-Mare Gaslight Company, and for extending their Limits for supplying Gas.
Lambeth Bridge Act 1861 (repealed)	24 & 25 Vict. c. cxvii	11 July 1861
An Act to incorporate a Company for making a new Bridge from Lambeth to Westminster. (Repealed by London County Council (Lambeth Bridge) Act 1924 (14 & 15 Geo. 5. c. lxvii))
Kingstown Improvement Act 1861	24 & 25 Vict. c. cxviii	11 July 1861
An Act for transferring from the Grand Jury of the County of Dublin to the Commissioners of Kingstown the Management of the Roads and Bridges in the said Town, and for better improving the same.
Wivenhoe and Brightlingsea Railway Act 1861	24 & 25 Vict. c. cxix	11 July 1861
An Act for making and maintaining a Railway from Wivenhoe to Brightlingsea, both in the County of Essex, and for other Purposes.
Bognor Railway Act 1861	24 & 25 Vict. c. cxx	11 July 1861
An Act for making a Railway from the London, Brighton, and South Coast Railway in the Parish of Eastergate in the County of Sussex to Bognor; and for other Purposes.
Portsea Island Gas Act 1861	24 & 25 Vict. c. cxxi	11 July 1861
An Act to increase the Capital and amend the Powers of the Portsea Island Gaslight Company.
Dublin and Antrim Junction Railway Act 1861	24 & 25 Vict. c. cxxii	11 July 1861
An Act for making a Railway from the Ulster Railway near Lisburn to the Belfast and Northern Counties Railway at Antrim, to be called "The Dublin and Antrim Junction Railway," and for other Purposes.
London and North Western Railway (Chester and Holyhead) Act 1861	24 & 25 Vict. c. cxxiii	11 July 1861
An Act for enabling the London and North-western Railway Company to acquire additional Lands in connexion with their Chester and Holyhead Railway; for renewing certain Powers as to Steamboats; and for other Purposes.
Penarth Harbour, Dock and Railway Act 1861	24 & 25 Vict. c. cxxiv	11 July 1861
An Act to empower the Penarth Harbour, Dock, and Railway Company to raise a further Sum of Money; to make a Road between their Harbour and Cardiff; and for other Purposes.
Thames Haven Dock (Abandonment) Act 1861	24 & 25 Vict. c. cxxv	11 July 1861
An Act for authorizing the Abandonment of the Thames Haven Dock and the Dissolution of the Company, and for other Purposes.
Westminster Improvement and Incumbered Estate Act 1861	24 & 25 Vict. c. cxxvi	11 July 1861
An Act for altering the Constitution of the Westminster Improvement Commission; for the compulsory Purchase of Lands and the Completion of the Improvements; for facilitating the Sale, Exchange, and Lease of Lands discharged from Incumbrances; and for winding up the Affairs of the Commission; Borrowing Power; and for other Purposes.
Sittingbourne and Sheerness Railway (Increase of Capital) Act 1861	24 & 25 Vict. c. cxxvii	11 July 1861
An Act to enable the Sittingbourne and Sheerness Railway Company to raise additional Capital; to alter, amend, and repeal some of the Provisions of the Acts relating to the Company; and for other Purposes.
London and North Western Railway (Lines Near Liverpool) Act 1861	24 & 25 Vict. c. cxxviii	11 July 1861
An Act for enabling the London and North-western Railway Company to construct Railways from Edgehill to near Bootle, from Winwick to Golborne, and from Aston to Ditton, with a Branch to Runcorn; to enlarge their Lime Street and Wapping Stations at Liverpool; and for other Purposes.
Downpatrick and Newry Railway Act 1861	24 & 25 Vict. c. cxxix	11 July 1861
An Act to authorize the Construction of a Railway in Ireland, to be called "The Downpatrick and Newry Railway."
London and North Western Railway (Eccles, Tyldesley and Wigan) Act 1861	24 & 25 Vict. c. cxxx	11 July 1861
An Act for enabling the London and North-western Railway Company to construct Railways from Eccles through Tyldesley to Wigan, with a Branch to Bedford and Leigh; and for other Purposes.
Fife and Kinross Railway Amendment Act 1861	24 & 25 Vict. c. cxxxi	11 July 1861
An Act to authorize the Fife and Kinross Railway Company to raise additional Capital.
North London Railway (Widening) Act 1861	24 & 25 Vict. c. cxxxii	11 July 1861
An Act to empower the North London Railway Company to widen a Portion of their Railway; and for other Purposes.
Metropolitan Railway Act 1861	24 & 25 Vict. c. cxxxiii	11 July 1861
An Act to authorize the Metropolitan Railway Company to make certain Improvements in their Communication with the Great Northern Railway and the Metropolitan Meat Market at Smithfield; to authorize the Purchase of additional Lands for Purposes connected with that Railway; to authorize Arrangements with the Corporation of London, and with certain Railway Companies; for amending the Acts relating to the Company; and for other Purposes.
Birkenhead Railway (Vesting) Act 1861	24 & 25 Vict. c. cxxxiv	11 July 1861
An Act for vesting the Birkenhead Railway in the London and North-western Railway Company and the Great Western Railway Company, and for other Purposes.
North Eastern Railway (Grosmont and Whitby Branches) Act 1861	24 & 25 Vict. c. cxxxv	11 July 1861
An Act to enable the North-eastern Railway Company to construct a Branch Railway between the North Yorkshire and Cleveland Railway at Castleton and the Whitby and Pickering Railway; to make a Deviation in and abandon Part of the last-mentioned Railway; to acquire additional Lands; and for other Purposes.
South Staffordshire Railway Act 1861	24 & 25 Vict. c. cxxxvi	11 July 1861
An Act to authorize the South Staffordshire Railway Company to reuse additional Capital; and for other Purposes.
South Essex Waterworks Act 1861	24 & 25 Vict. c. cxxxvii	11 July 1861
An Act for more effectually supplying Water to several Towns and Places in Essex by a Company to be called "South Essex Waterworks Company."
Enniskillen and Bundoran Railway Act 1861	24 & 25 Vict. c. cxxxviii	11 July 1861
An Act for making a Railway from the Londonderry and Enniskillen Railway in the County of Tyrone to the Town of Bundoran in the County of Donegal, and for other Purposes.
Midland Railway (Otley and Ilkley Extension) Act 1861	24 & 25 Vict. c. cxxxix	11 July 1861
An Act to enable the Midland Railway Company to make Railways from the Leeds and Bradford Line of their Railway to Otley and Ilkley in the West Riding of the County of York; and for other Purposes.
New Ross Port and Harbour Amendment Act 1861	24 & 25 Vict. c. cxl	11 July 1861
An Act to provide for the future Election of Commissioners, to confirm certain Acts of the present Commissioners, and to consolidate in One Act the various Provisions for the Management and Regulation of the Port and Harbour of New Ross in the Counties of Wexford and Kilkenny.
North Eastern Railway (Extension to Otley, &c.) Act 1861	24 & 25 Vict. c. cxli	11 July 1861
An Act to enable the North-eastern Railway Company to construct Branch Railways between Arthington, Otley, and Ilkley; and for other Purposes.
Parsonstown and Portumna Bridge Railway Act 1861	24 & 25 Vict. c. cxlii	11 July 1861
An Act to authorize the Construction of a Railway from the Great Southern and Western Railway near Parsonstown to Portumna Bridge on the River Shannon, and for other Purposes.
West Cheshire Railways Act 1861	24 & 25 Vict. c. cxliii	11 July 1861
An Act for incorporating the West Cheshire Railway Company, and for authorizing them to make and maintain Railways from Northwich to Helsby; and for other Purposes.
Rhymney Railway (Capital and Branch) Act 1861	24 & 25 Vict. c. cxliv	11 July 1861
An Act for reviving the Powers of the Rhymney Railway Company with respect to their Bargoed Rhymney Branch Railway, and for authorizing them to raise further Monies; and for other Purposes.
City of Glasgow Life Assurance Company's Act 1861 (repealed)	24 & 25 Vict. c. cxlv	11 July 1861
An Act to incorporate the City of Glasgow Life Assurance Company, and for other Purposes. (Repealed by Statute Law (Repeals) Act 1998 (c. 43))
Staffordshire Potteries Waterworks Amendment Act 1861	24 & 25 Vict. c. cxlvi	11 July 1861
An Act to enable the Staffordshire Potteries Waterworks Company to extend their Works, and to raise additional Capital; and to amend the Act (Note: Staffordshire Potteries Waterworks Consolidation and Extension Act 1853 (16 & 17 Vict. c. cxcviii)) relating to the said Company.
Great Southern and Western Railway Extension Act 1861	24 & 25 Vict. c. cxlvii	11 July 1861
An Act to enable the Great Southern and Western Railway Company to make a Railway from Roscrea in the County of Tipperary to Birdhill in the same County; and for other Purposes.
Great Southern and Western Railway (Capital, &c.) Act 1861	24 & 25 Vict. c. cxlviii	11 July 1861
An Act to enable the Great Southern and Western Railway Company to raise further Sums; and to amend the Provisions of the Acts of that Company with respect to the Transfer of Stock; and to enable them to acquire certain Shares in the Undertaking of the Limerick and Castle Connell Railway Company, now held by the Midland Great Western Railway of Ireland Company, and to purchase additional Lands; and for other Purposes.
Greetwell District Drainage Act 1861	24 & 25 Vict. c. cxlix	11 July 1861
An Act for the better Drainage of the Greetwell District in the County of Lincoln.
Manchester and Milford Railway (Aberystwyth Branch) Act 1861	24 & 25 Vict. c. cl	11 July 1861
An Act to enable the Manchester and Milford Railway Company to construct a Branch Railway from the Devil's Bridge to Aberystwith; and for other Purposes.
Grand Junction Waterworks Act 1861	24 & 25 Vict. c. cli	11 July 1861
An Act for extending the Limits within which the Grand Junction Waterworks Company may supply Water, and for other Purposes.
Wolverhampton New Waterworks Act 1861	24 & 25 Vict. c. clii	11 July 1861
An Act to confer additional Powers upon the Wolverhampton New Waterworks Company; and for other Purposes.
Great North of Scotland Railway Amendment Act 1861	24 & 25 Vict. c. cliii	11 July 1861
An Act to enable the Great North of Scotland Railway Company to enlarge their Stations at Kittybrewster and at Aberdeen, and to alter the Line and Levels of their Dock Branch.
Fylde Waterworks Act 1861	24 & 25 Vict. c. cliv	22 July 1861
An Act for incorporating the Fylde Waterworks Company; and for authorizing them to make and maintain Waterworks, and to supply Water at Kirkham, Lytham, Blackpool, Fleetwood, Poulton, Rossall, Garstang, Southshore, and Bispham in the County Palatine of Lancaster, and to Shipping at Fleetwood and Lytham.
Blackburn Waterworks Act 1861	24 & 25 Vict. c. clv	22 July 1861
An Act to make better Provision for supplying with Water the Town and Township of Blackburn, and the Townships of Lower Darwen, Livesey, Witton, Oswaldtwistle, and Little Harwood; and for other Purposes.
Trent, Ancholme and Grimsby Railway Act 1861	24 & 25 Vict. c. clvi	22 July 1861
An Act to authorize the Construction in Lincolnshire of a Railway from the River Trent across the River Ancholme to the Manchester, Sheffield, and Lincolnshire Railway.
Stockton and Darlington Railway (Capital) Act 1861	24 & 25 Vict. c. clvii	22 July 1861
An Act for enabling the Stockton and Darlington Railway Company to raise additional Capital; and for other Purposes.
Leven and East of Fife Railway Act 1861	24 & 25 Vict. c. clviii	22 July 1861
An Act for the Amalgamation of the Leven and East of Fife Railway Companies.
Leven and East of Fife Railway (Extension) Act 1861	24 & 25 Vict. c. clix	22 July 1861
An Act to enable the Leven and Fast of Fife Railway Companies to extend the East of Fife Railway to Anstruther.
Airedale Drainage Act 1861	24 & 25 Vict. c. clx	22 July 1861
An Act for the draining of Lands in Airedale, adjoining and near to the River Aire, in the West Riding of the County of York; and for other Purposes.
Lough Swilly Railway (Buncrana Extension) Act 1861	24 & 25 Vict. c. clxi	22 July 1861
An Act to enable the Londonderry and Lough Swilly Railway Company to extend their Railway to Buncrana in the County of Donegal.
Swansea Vale Railway Extension Act 1861	24 & 25 Vict. c. clxii	22 July 1861
An Act to authorize the Swansea Vale Railway Company to make certain new Railways; and for other Purposes.
Dumfries, Lochmaben and Lockerby Junction Railway Deviation Act 1861	24 & 25 Vict. c. clxiii	22 July 1861
An Act to enable the Dumfries, Lochmaben, and Lockerby Junction Railway Company to divert their authorized Line of Railway; and for other Purposes.
Hammersmith and City Railway Act 1861	24 & 25 Vict. c. clxiv	22 July 1861
An Act for making a Railway from the Great Western Railway to Hammersmith, to be called "The Hammersmith and City Railway," and for other Purposes.
Barnsley Coal Railway Act 1861	24 & 25 Vict. c. clxv	22 July 1861
An Act to authorize the Construction of a Railway in the West Riding of Yorkshire, to be called "The Barnsley Coal Railway."
Carlisle Citadel Station Act 1861	24 & 25 Vict. c. clxvi	22 July 1861
An Act for the Enlargement, Regulation, and Management of "The Citadel Station" at Carlisle, situate at the Junction of the Lancaster and Carlisle and the Caledonian Railways, and for other Purposes.
Marlborough Railway Act 1861	24 & 25 Vict. c. clxvii	22 July 1861
An Act to authorize the Construction of a Railway from the Berks and Hants Extension Railway to Marlborough in Wiltshire.
Rathkeale and Newcastle Junction Railway Act 1861	24 & 25 Vict. c. clxviii	22 July 1861
An Act for making a Railway from the Limerick and Foynes Railway to the Town of Newcastle in the County of Limerick, to be called "The Rathkeale and Newcastle Junction Railway," and for other Purposes.
South Yorkshire Railway Amendment Act 1861	24 & 25 Vict. c. clxix	22 July 1861
An Act for the Extension of the South Yorkshire Railway across the Trent near Keadby in Lincolnshire, and for granting further Powers to the South Yorkshire Railway and River Dun Company.
Wigan Gas Act 1861	24 & 25 Vict. c. clxx	22 July 1861
An Act for better supplying with Gas the Borough of Wigan and other Places adjacent thereto in the County Palatine of Lancaster.
Waveney Valley Railway Act 1861 (repealed)	24 & 25 Vict. c. clxxi	22 July 1861
An Act to grant further Powers to the Waveney Valley Railway Company as to their Capital. (Repealed by Great Eastern Railway (Additional Powers) Act 1863 (26 & 27 Vict. c. cxc))
Dublin Corporation Waterworks Act 1861	24 & 25 Vict. c. clxxii	22 July 1861
An Act to enable the Lord Mayor, Aldermen, and Burgesses of Dublin to construct additional Waterworks; and for other Purposes.
Bolton Improvement Act 1861	24 & 25 Vict. c. clxxiii	22 July 1861
An Act for the further Improvement of the Borough of Bolton, and for other Purposes.
Brighton, Uckfield and Tunbridge Wells Railway Act 1861	24 & 25 Vict. c. clxxiv	22 July 1861
An Act for making a Railway from the London, Brighton, and South Coast Railway at Uckfield in the County of Sussex to Tunbridge Wells in the County of Kent, and for other Purposes.
Stockport, Timperley and Altrincham Junction Railway Act 1861	24 & 25 Vict. c. clxxv	22 July 1861
An Act for incorporating the Stockport, Timperley, and Altrincham Railway Company, and for authorizing them to make and maintain the Stockport, Timperley, and Altrincham Railway; and for other Purposes.
Hawick Municipal Police and Improvement Act 1861	24 & 25 Vict. c. clxxvi	22 July 1861
An Act for altering and amending the Constitution of the Burgh of Hawick; extending the Boundaries thereof; maintaining an efficient System of Police therein; improving the said Burgh; and for other Purposes.
Kinross-shire Railway (Branches) Act 1861	24 & 25 Vict. c. clxxvii	22 July 1861
An Act to enable the Kinross-shire Railway Company to make certain Branch Railways; and for other Purposes.
Saffron Walden Railway Act 1861	24 & 25 Vict. c. clxxviii	22 July 1861
An Act to authorize the Construction of a Railway from the Eastern Counties Railway to Saffron Walden in Essex.
Conway and Llanrwst Railway Act 1861	24 & 25 Vict. c. clxxix	22 July 1861
An Act for enabling the Conway and Llanrwst Railway Company to make a Deviation and Alteration of their authorized Line of Railway; and for other Purposes.
East Suffolk Railway Act 1861	24 & 25 Vict. c. clxxx	22 July 1861
An Act to grant further Powers to the East Suffolk Railway Company; to authorize certain Arrangements with respect to their Share Capital; and to amend the Acts relating to the Company.
Aberystwith and Welsh Coast Railway Act 1861 or the Aberystwyth and Welsh Coast Railway Act 1861	24 & 25 Vict. c. clxxxi	22 July 1861
An Act for making Railways from Aberystwith to various Places in the Counties of Cardigan, Montgomery, Merioneth, and Carnarvon, to be called "The Aberystwith and Welsh Coast Railways," and for other Purposes.
Bishop's Stortford, Dunmow and Braintree Railway Act 1861	24 & 25 Vict. c. clxxxii	22 July 1861
An Act for making a Railway from Bishop Stortford through Dunmow to Braintree, with a Branch therefrom, and for other Purposes.
Cleveland Railway Act 1861	24 & 25 Vict. c. clxxxiii	22 July 1861
An Act to enable the Cleveland Railway Company to extend their Railway from Guisbrough to the River Tees, with Branches connected with that Extension, and to make certain Deviations in the authorized Line of their Railway; to confer certain Powers with reference to other Undertakings; to amend the Act (Note: Cleveland Railway Act 1858 (21 & 22 Vict. c. cxiv)) relating to the Cleveland Railway; and for other Purposes.
Forest of Dean Central Railway Act 1861	24 & 25 Vict. c. clxxxiv	22 July 1861
An Act to enable the Forest of Dean Central Railway Company to construct further Works; and for other Purposes connected with their Undertaking.
Hatfield Chase Warping and Improvement Act 1861	24 & 25 Vict. c. clxxxv	22 July 1861
An Act to amend the Hatfield Chase Warping and Improvement Act, 1854. (Note: Hatfield Chase Warping and Improvement Act 1854 (17 & 18 Vict. c. ix))
Inverness and Perth Junction Railway Act 1861	24 & 25 Vict. c. clxxxvi	22 July 1861
An Act for making a Railway from Forres to Birnam near Dunkeld, with a Branch to Aberfeldy, to be called "The Inverness and Perth Junction Railway;" and for other Purposes.
Ludlow and Clee Hill Railway Act 1861	24 & 25 Vict. c. clxxxvii	22 July 1861
An Act for making a Railway to be called "The Ludlow and Clee Hill Railway," and for other Purposes.
Mersey Docks (Corporation Purchase) Act 1861	24 & 25 Vict. c. clxxxviii	22 July 1861
An Act to enable the Mersey Docks and Harbour Board to purchase from the Corporation of Liverpool the Reversion in Fee of certain Leasehold Lands of the Board at Birkenhead; to extend the Period for the Completion of certain Works at Birkenhead; and to enable the Board to improve the working of the Docks and the loading and unloading of Vessels.
Wenlock Railway Act 1861	24 & 25 Vict. c. clxxxix	22 July 1861
An Act for making Railways from Much Wenlock to the Shrewsbury and Hereford Railway, and a Railway from the Much Wenlock and Severn Junction Railway into Coalbrookdale, with Branches and Works connected therewith; to authorize certain Arrangements with and confer certain Powers upon other Companies; and for other Purposes.
Salisbury and Dorset Junction Railway Act 1861	24 & 25 Vict. c. cxc	22 July 1861
An Act for making a Railway to improve the Communication between Salisbury and the Southern Part of the County of Dorset, and for other Purposes.
South Eastern Railway Amendment Act 1861	24 & 25 Vict. c. cxci	22 July 1861
An Act for conferring further Powers on the South-eastern Railway Company with respect to Steam Vessels; and for enabling that Company to make Byelaws for regulating the London and Greenwich Railway; and for amending some of the Acts relating to the South-eastern Railway Company with respect to the Accounts to be kept by them; and for other Purposes.
Vale of Clwyd Railway Act 1861	24 & 25 Vict. c. cxcii	22 July 1861
An Act to enable the Vale of Clwyd Railway Company to raise additional Capital.
Ware, Hadham and Buntingford Railway (Deviation) Act 1861	24 & 25 Vict. c. cxciii	22 July 1861
An Act to enable the Ware, Hadham, and Buntingford Railway Company to make a Deviation in the authorized Line of their Railway; and for other Purposes.
Ramsey Railway Act 1861	24 & 25 Vict. c. cxciv	22 July 1861
An Act to authorize the Construction of a Railway from Holme to Ramsey in the County of Huntingdon.
Alva Railway Act 1861	24 & 25 Vict. c. cxcv	22 July 1861
An Act for making a Railway from the Stirling and Dunfermline Railway to the Town of Alva.
North London Railway (City Branch) Act 1861	24 & 25 Vict. c. cxcvi	22 July 1861
An Act to empower the North London Railway Company to construct a Railway from Liverpool Street in the City of London to join their existing Railway at Kingsland; and for other Purposes.
Coleford, Monmouth, Usk and Pontypool (Lease, &c.) Act 1861 or the Coleford, Monmouth, Usk and Pontypool Railway (Lease, &c.) Act 1861	24 & 25 Vict. c. cxcvii	22 July 1861
An Act for enabling the Coleford, Monmouth, Usk, and Pontypool Railway Company to lease their Undertaking to the West Midland Railway Company; and for other Purposes.
Glasgow and Milngavie Junction Railway Act 1861	24 & 25 Vict. c. cxcviii	1 August 1861
An Act for making a Railway from the Glasgow, Dumbarton, and Helensburgh Railway to Milngavie, and for other Purposes.
Lynn and Hunstanton Railway Act 1861	24 & 25 Vict. c. cxcix	1 August 1861
An Act for making a Railway from Lynn to Hunstanton, all in the County of Norfolk.
Devon Valley Railway Act 1861	24 & 25 Vict. c. cc	1 August 1861
An Act to confer on the Devon Valley Railway Company further Powers for the Completion of their Railway; and for other Purposes.
Caledonian and Symington, Biggar and Broughton Railways Amalgamation Act 1861	24 & 25 Vict. c. cci	1 August 1861
An Act to authorize the Amalgamation of the Symington, Biggar, and Broughton Railway Company with the Caledonian Railway Company; and for other Purposes.
Caledonian Railway (Rutherglen and Coatbridge Branches) Act 1861	24 & 25 Vict. c. ccii	1 August 1861
An Act to enable the Caledonian Railway Company to make a Branch Railway from Rutherglen to Coatbridge, with a Branch to Whifflat; and for other Purposes.
Cockermouth, Keswick and Penrith Railway Act 1861	24 & 25 Vict. c. cciii	1 August 1861
An Act for making a Railway from Cocker mouth to Keswick and Penrith, with a Branch thereout, all in the County of Cumberland; and for other Purposes.
Great Western Railway (Lightmoor to Coalbrookdale, &c.) Act 1861	24 & 25 Vict. c. cciv	1 August 1861
An Act for enabling the Great Western Railway Company to make and maintain a Railway from Lightmoor to Coalbrookdale; and for other Purposes.
Kirkcudbright Railway Act 1861	24 & 25 Vict. c. ccv	1 August 1861
An Act for making a Railway from Kirkcudbright to Castle Douglas, and for other Purposes.
Birmingham Improvement Act 1861 (repealed)	24 & 25 Vict. c. ccvi	1 August 1861
An Act to amend the Birmingham Improvement Act, 1851, (Note: Birmingham Improvement Act 1851 (14 & 15 Vict. c. xciii)) and for other Purposes. (Repealed by Birmingham Corporation (Consolidation Act) 1883 (46 & 47 Vict. c. lxx))
Cork and Macroom Direct Railway Act 1861	24 & 25 Vict. c. ccvii	1 August 1861
An Act for making a Railway from the Cork and Bandon Railway near the City of Cork to the Town of Macroom in the County of Cork.
London and North Western Railway (Additional Powers) Act 1861	24 & 25 Vict. c. ccviii	1 August 1861
An Act to empower the London and North-western Railway Company to make Railways at Burton-upon-Trent; to confer additional Powers upon them with reference to Parts of their Undertaking; and for other Purposes.
Somerset Central Railway Act 1861	24 & 25 Vict. c. ccix	1 August 1861
An Act for extending the Periods for the Purchase of Lands and the Execution of Works for the Somerset Central Railway Company's authorized Railway from Glastonbury to Bruton; for authorizing the Somerset Central Railway Company to raise further Monies; and for other Purposes.
South Wales Mineral Railway Act 1861	24 & 25 Vict. c. ccx	1 August 1861
An Act to enable the South Wales Mineral Railway Company to extend their Railway to the Briton Ferry Docks; and for other Purposes.
Stockport District Waterworks Act 1861	24 & 25 Vict. c. ccxi	1 August 1861
An Act for better supplying with Water the Borough of Stockport in the Counties of Chester and Lancaster, and the several Townships and Places adjacent or near thereto in those Counties; and for other Purposes.
West Midland and Severn Valley Railway Companies Act 1861 or the West Midland and Severn Valley Companies Act 1861	24 & 25 Vict. c. ccxii	1 August 1861
An Act for authorizing the Construction of Railways from the Severn Valley Railway to the West Midland Railway near Kidderminster, and the leasing of the Wellington and Severn Junction Railway by the Great Western and West Midland Railway Companies; and for other Purposes.
Worcester, Bromyard and Leominster Railway Act 1861	24 & 25 Vict. c. ccxiii	1 August 1861
An Act for making a Railway from the West Midland Railway at Bransford Bridge in the County of Worcester to the Shrewsbury and Hereford Railway near Leominster in the County of Hereford, and for other Purposes.
Edinburgh, Perth and Dundee Railway Act 1861	24 & 25 Vict. c. ccxiv	1 August 1861
An Act to enable the Edinburgh, Perth, and Dundee Railway Company to make Byelaws for their Piers, Basins, and Works at Ferry-port-on-Craig and Broughty, and the Ferry between Ferry-port-on-Craig and Broughty; to vest the Burntisland and Granton Ferry in the Company; to construct Siding Accommodations and Works for Supply of Water; to amalgamate the Kinross-shire Railway with their Undertaking; and for other Purposes.
Cornwall Railway Act 1861	24 & 25 Vict. c. ccxv	1 August 1861
An Act to repeal and consolidate the several Acts relating to the Cornwall Railway Company; to empower them to make a Deviation Railway; to extend the Time for Completion of Parts of their Railway; and for other Purposes.
Victoria Docks Gas Extension Act 1861	24 & 25 Vict. c. ccxvi	1 August 1861
An Act for granting further Powers to the Victoria Docks Gas Company.
Llanelly Railway (New Lines) Act 1861	24 & 25 Vict. c. ccxvii	1 August 1861
An Act for authorizing the Llanelly Railway and Dock Company to make and maintain additional Lines of Railway, and to raise further Monies; and for other Purposes.
Monmouthshire Railway and Canal (Works) Act 1861	24 & 25 Vict. c. ccxviii	1 August 1861
An Act for authorizing the Monmouthshire Railway and Canal Company to make and maintain new Lines of Railway and Deviations, and to acquire other Railways, and for authorizing them to raise additional Capital; and for other Purposes.
St. George's Harbour Act 1861	24 & 25 Vict. c. ccxix	1 August 1861
An Act for authorizing a Lease or Sale of the Railway of the Saint Georges Harbour Company to the London and North-western Railway Company; and for reducing and regulating the Capital of the Saint Georges Harbour Company; and for other Purposes.
Southampton and Netley Railway Act 1861	24 & 25 Vict. c. ccxx	1 August 1861
An Act for making a Railway between the London and South-western Railway at or near to that Railway at Saint Denis near Southampton, and the Military Hospital at Netley, and for other Purposes.
Stourbridge Railway Extension Act 1861	24 & 25 Vict. c. ccxxi	1 August 1861
An Act for extending the Stourbridge Railway to the Birmingham, Wolverhampton, and Stour Valley Railway at Smethwick, and for making a Branch Railway in connexion with the Stourbridge Railway; for authorizing Arrangements with other Companies; and for other Purposes.
Swansea Harbour Act 1861	24 & 25 Vict. c. ccxxii	1 August 1861
An Act to enable the Swansea Harbour Trustees to raise a further Sum of Money for the Purposes of their Undertaking.
Oswestry, Ellesmere and Whitchurch Railway Act 1861	24 & 25 Vict. c. ccxxiii	1 August 1861
An Act for making a Railway from the Oswestry and Newtown Railway at Oswestry to the London and North-western Railway at Whitchurch in the County of Salop, and for other Purposes.
Petersfield Railway Deviation Act 1861	24 & 25 Vict. c. ccxxiv	1 August 1861
An Act to extend and deviate a Portion of the Petersfield Railway.
Westminster Insurance Society's Dissolution Act 1861	24 & 25 Vict. c. ccxxv	1 August 1861
An Act to enable the Society or Partnership called "The Westminster Society for Insurance of Lives and Survivorships and for granting Annuities" to make Provision for satisfying the Liabilities and Engagements of the said Society or Partnership; to confirm an Agreement entered into between the said Society or Partnership and the Society or Partnership called "The Guardian Fire and Life Assurance Company;" to dissolve the said Westminster Society; and to authorize the Distribution among the Members thereof of so much of the Capital of the said Westminster Society as shall not be required for the Purpose of satisfying the Liabilities and Engagements thereof.
West of Fife Railway and Harbour Act 1861	24 & 25 Vict. c. ccxxvi	1 August 1861
An Act to amalgamate the West of Fife Mineral Railway Company and the Charleston Railway and Harbour Company.
Rumney Railway Act 1861	24 & 25 Vict. c. ccxxvii	1 August 1861
An Act for authorizing the Rumney Railway Company to alter the Line and Levels of their existing Railway, and to make and maintain new Railways in connexion therewith; and for other Purposes.
Caledonian Railway (Stonehouse Branch) Act 1861	24 & 25 Vict. c. ccxxviii	1 August 1861
An Act to enable the Caledonian Railway Company to make a Branch Railway from their Lesmahagow Line to Cot Castle near Stonehouse; to extend the Southfield Branch of that Line; to enlarge their Station at Symington; and for other Purposes.
Caledonian Railway (Cleland Extension and Branches) Act 1861	24 & 25 Vict. c. ccxxix	1 August 1861
An Act to enable the Caledonian Railway Company to extend their Cleland Branch to Morningside, and to make Branch Railways to Omoa Ironworks, to Drumbowie, and to Lanridge, all in the County of Lanark.
Forth and Clyde Junction Railway (Dalmonach Branch) Act 1861	24 & 25 Vict. c. ccxxx	1 August 1861
An Act to enable the Forth and Clyde Junction Railway Company to make a Branch Railway to Dalmonach Printworks in the County of Dumbarton, and to create additional Shares; and for other Purposes.
Eastern Counties Railway Act 1861 (repealed)	24 & 25 Vict. c. ccxxxi	6 August 1861
An Act to enable the Eastern Counties Railway Company to make new Lines of Railway; and for other Purposes. (Repealed by Great Eastern Railway Act 1862 (25 & 26 Vict. c. ccxxiii))
Kilkenny Junction Railway Act 1861	24 & 25 Vict. c. ccxxxii	6 August 1861
An Act to enable the Kilkenny Junction Railway Company to abandon the Portion of their authorized Line between Abbeyleix and Mountrath, and instead thereof to make new Lines to the Maryborough Station and to the Roscrea Junction on the Great Southern and Western Railway; and for other Purposes.
Metropolitan Railway (Finsbury Circus Extension) Act 1861	24 & 25 Vict. c. ccxxxiii	6 August 1861
An Act for extending the Metropolitan Railway from Smithfield to Finsbury Circus; to authorize Arrangements with other Companies; to amend the Acts relating to the Metropolitan Railway; and for other Purposes.
West London Extension Railway Act 1861	24 & 25 Vict. c. ccxxxiv	6 August 1861
An Act for increasing the Capital of and conferring further Powers on the West London Extension Railway Company; and for other Purposes.
Brecon and Merthyr Railway Extensions Act 1861	24 & 25 Vict. c. ccxxxv	6 August 1861
An Act to enable the Brecon and Merthyr Tydfil Junction Railway Company to make certain new Lines of Railway; and for other Purposes.
Bristol Channel Pilotage Act 1861	24 & 25 Vict. c. ccxxxvi	6 August 1861
An Act for establishing a separate System of Pilotage for the several Ports of Cardiff, Newport^ and Gloucester, in the Bristol Channel.
Colne Valley and Halstead Railway Amendment Act 1861	24 & 25 Vict. c. ccxxxvii	6 August 1861
An Act to increase the Capital of the Colne Valley and Halstead Railway Company, and for other Purposes.
Dublin General Markets Act 1861	24 & 25 Vict. c. ccxxxviii	6 August 1861
An Act for providing and constructing Markets, Market Places, and Slaughterhouses, with all necessary Conveniences, within the Parishes of Saint Mary and Saint Bridget in the City of Dublin.
London, Chatham and Dover Railway (Various Powers) Act 1861	24 & 25 Vict. c. ccxxxix	6 August 1861
An Act to authorize a Lease of the Margate Railway to the London, Chatham, and Dover Railway Company, and for other Purposes.
London, Chatham and Dover Railway (Works) Act 1861	24 & 25 Vict. c. ccxl	6 August 1861
An Act to enable the London, Chatham, and Dover Railway Company to make certain Deviations and Junction Lines of Railway; and for other Purposes.
Kent Coast Railway Act 1861	24 & 25 Vict. c. ccxli	6 August 1861
An Act to enable the Margate Railway Company to extend their Railway to Ramsgate; to change their Name; and for other Purposes connected with their Undertaking.
Swansea and Neath Railway Act 1861	24 & 25 Vict. c. ccxlii	6 August 1861
An Act to authorize the Construction in the County of Glamorgan of a Railway from the Vale of Neath Railway to the South Wales Railway at Swansea, to be called "The Swansea and Neath Railway."
Chard and Taunton Railway Act 1861	24 & 25 Vict. c. ccxliii	6 August 1861
An Act for making a Railway to connect Chard and Taunton in the County of Somerset, and for other Purposes.
West Hartlepool Harbour and Railway Traffic, &c. Act 1861	24 & 25 Vict. c. ccxliv	6 August 1861
An Act to regulate the mutual Facilities to be afforded to Traffic by the West Hartlepool Harbour and Railway Company and by the Stockton and Darlington, South Durham and Lancashire Union, and Eden Valley Railway Companies; to give further Powers to the West Hartlepool Harbour and Railway Company with reference to the Management of their Docks and Works; and for other Purposes.
Lynn and Sutton Bridge Railway Act 1861	24 & 25 Vict. c. ccxlv	6 August 1861
An Act to authorize the Construction of a Railway from the East Anglian Railways at Lynn to the Norwich and Spalding Railway at Sutton Bridge, and for other Purposes.
Midland Counties and Shannon Junction Railway Act 1861	24 & 25 Vict. c. ccxlvi	6 August 1861
An Act for making Railways from Clara to Meelick in the King's County, Ireland, and for building a Bridge across the Shannon at Meelick.
Mold and Denbigh Junction Railway Act 1861	24 & 25 Vict. c. ccxlvii	6 August 1861
An Act for making a Railway from the Mold Branch of the Chester and Holyhead Railway at Mold to the Vale of Clwyd Railway, to be called "The Mold and Denbigh Junction Railway;" and for other Purposes.
Blane Valley Railway Act 1861	24 & 25 Vict. c. ccxlviii	6 August 1861
An Act for making a Railway from Lennoxtown of Campsie to Strathblane, with a Branch to Lettermill in the County of Stirling, and for other Purposes.
West Hartlepool Harbour and Railway Company's Capital Act 1861	24 & 25 Vict. c. ccxlix	6 August 1861
An Act to enable the West Hartlepool Harbour and Railway Company to raise further Money; to amend the Acts relating to the Company; and for other Purposes.

=== Private acts ===
Short title	Citation	Royal assent
Long title
Atkinson Institution of Glasgow Act 1861	24 & 25 Vict. c. 1 Pr.	1 August 1861
An Act to incorporate the Trustees of "The Atkinson Institution of Glasgow," acting under the Will of Thomas Atkinson, Bookseller and Stationer, of Glasgow, deceased, and to enlarge the Powers of such Trustees, the better to enable them to carry out the benevolent Designs of the said Testator.
Savile Estate (Leasing) Act 1861	24 & 25 Vict. c. 2 Pr.	1 August 1861
An Act to extend the Powers of Leasing contained in the Will of the Right Honourable John Savile Lumley Savile Earl of Scarbrough deceased, with respect to certain Estates in the County of York, thereby devised, and therein called the Savile York Estates; and for other Purposes; and of which the Short Title is "Savile Estate (Leasing) Act, 1861."
M'Mahon Estates Act 1861	24 & 25 Vict. c. 3 Pr.	1 August 1861
An Act for authorizing the Application for the Maintenance and Benefit of the Children of Sir Beresford Burston M'Mahon Baronet of certain Monies by the Will of Sir William M'Mahon Baronet, deceased, directed to be accumulated during the Life of Sir Beresford Burston M'Mahon.
Duke of Sutherland's Estate Act 1861	24 & 25 Vict. c. 4 Pr.	6 August 1861
An Act to authorize the Most Noble George Granville William Duke and Earl of Sutherland and Anne Duchess of Sutherland to disentail the Estate of Cromarty, and to grant a new Entail thereof.
Sir William Middleton's Estate Act 1861	24 & 25 Vict. c. 5 Pr.	6 August 1861
An Act to enable the Trustees of the Will of the late Sir William Fowle Fowle Middleton to carry into effect certain Contracts affecting his Estates in London and Middlesex.
Simpson's Hospital Estate Act 1861 or the Simpson's Hospital Estate Amendment Act 1861	24 & 25 Vict. c. 6 Pr.	6 August 1861
An Act for the Amendment of an Act of the Parliament of Ireland of the Session of the 19th and 20th Years of George the Third, (Note: Simpson's Hospital Estate Act 1779 (19 & 20 Geo. 3. c. 2 Pr. (I))) incorporating the Trustees of the Hospital founded by George Simpson Esquire, and for confirming Leases granted by the Trustees.
Sir John Simeon's Leasing Act 1861	24 & 25 Vict. c. 7 Pr.	6 August 1861
An Act for confirming Leases granted by Sir Richard Godin Simeon Baronet, deceased, and Sir John Simeon Baronet, respectively, of Parts of the Saint John's Estate in the Parish of Saint Helens in the Isle of Wight; and for other Purposes; and of which the Short Title is "Sir John Simeon's Leasing Act, 1861."
Vane Tempest Estate Act 1861	24 & 25 Vict. c. 8 Pr.	6 August 1861
An Act to simplify certain of the Trusts and Provisions in the Settlements of the Vane Tempest Estates, and for other Purposes connected therewith.
Earl of Egremont's Estate Act 1861	24 & 25 Vict. c. 9 Pr.	6 August 1861
An Act to authorize the granting of Building and Repairing Leases of Parts of the Estates devised and bequeathed by the Will of the Right Honourable George Earl of Egremont deceased, or become subject to the Trusts thereof; and for other Purposes.
Hemsworth Estate Act 1861	24 & 25 Vict. c. 10 Pr.	6 August 1861
An Act for enabling Trustees to raise Money on Mortgage of the Hemsworth Estates in the Counties of Suffolk and Norfolk, and for giving Powers of Sale and Exchange over the same Estates.

=== Sources ===
- A Collection of the Public General Statutes. Vol. 24 & 25 Victoria. London: Eyre & Spottiswoode. 1861 – via Google Books.
- A Collection of the Public General Statutes. Vol. 24 & 25 Victoria. London: Eyre & Spottiswoode. 1861 – via Internet Archive.
- The Statutes of the United Kingdom of Great Britain and Ireland. Vol. 24 & 25 Victoria. London: Eyre & Spottiswoode. 1861 – via Google Books.
- 24 & 25 Victoria. London: Eyre & Spottiswoode. 1861 – via Internet Archive.
- The Journals of the House of Commons (PDF). Vol. 116: February 1861 - January 1862 – via parliament.uk.

== See also ==
- List of acts of the Parliament of the United Kingdom
