= List of acts of the Parliament of the United Kingdom from 1868 =

This is a complete list of acts of the Parliament of the United Kingdom for the year 1868.

Note that the first parliament of the United Kingdom was held in 1801; parliaments between 1707 and 1800 were either parliaments of Great Britain or of Ireland). For acts passed up until 1707, see the list of acts of the Parliament of England and the list of acts of the Parliament of Scotland. For acts passed from 1707 to 1800, see the list of acts of the Parliament of Great Britain. See also the list of acts of the Parliament of Ireland.

For acts of the devolved parliaments and assemblies in the United Kingdom, see the list of acts of the Scottish Parliament, the list of acts of the Northern Ireland Assembly, and the list of acts and measures of Senedd Cymru; see also the list of acts of the Parliament of Northern Ireland.

The number shown after each act's title is its chapter number. Acts passed before 1963 are cited using this number, preceded by the year(s) of the reign during which the relevant parliamentary session was held; thus the Union with Ireland Act 1800 is cited as "39 & 40 Geo. 3 c. 67", meaning the 67th act passed during the session that started in the 39th year of the reign of George III and which finished in the 40th year of that reign. Note that the modern convention is to use Arabic numerals in citations (thus "41 Geo. 3" rather than "41 Geo. III"). Acts of the last session of the Parliament of Great Britain and the first session of the Parliament of the United Kingdom are both cited as "41 Geo. 3".

Some of these acts have a short title. Some of these acts have never had a short title. Some of these acts have a short title given to them by later acts, such as by the Short Titles Act 1896.

== 31 & 32 Vict. ==
Continuing the third session of the 19th Parliament of the United Kingdom, which met from 19 November 1867 until 31 July 1868.

=== Public general acts ===
Short title	Citation	Royal assent
Long title
Habeas Corpus (Ireland) Act 1868 (repealed)	31 & 32 Vict. c. 7	28 February 1868
An Act to further continue the Act of the Twenty-ninth Year of the Reign of Her present Majesty, Chapter One, intituled "An Act to empower the Lord Lieutenant or other Chief Governor or Governors of Ireland to apprehend, and detain for a limited Time, such Persons as he or they shall suspect of conspiring against Her Majesty's Person and Government." (Note: Habeas Corpus Suspension (Ireland) Act 1866 (29 & 30 Vict. c. 1)) (Repealed by Statute Law Revision Act 1875 (38 & 39 Vict. c. 66))
London Museum Site Act 1868	31 & 32 Vict. c. 8	28 February 1868
An Act to provide for the Acquisition of a Site for a Museum in the East of London.
Exchequer Extra Receipts Act 1868	31 & 32 Vict. c. 9	30 March 1868
An Act to regulate the Disposal of extra Receipts of Public Departments.
Consolidated Fund (£362,398 19s. 9d.) Act or the Supply Act 1868 (repealed)	31 & 32 Vict. c. 10	30 March 1868
An Act to apply the Sum of Three hundred and sixty-two thousand three hundred und ninety-eight Pounds Nineteen Shillings and Ninepence out of the Consolidated Fund to the Service of the Years ending the Thirty-first Day of March One thousand eight hundred and sixty-seven and the Thirty-first Day of March One thousand eight hundred and sixty-eight. (Repealed by Statute Law Revision Act 1875 (38 & 39 Vict. c. 66))
Court of Appeal in Chancery Act 1868 (repealed)	31 & 32 Vict. c. 11	30 March 1868
An Act to amend an Act (Note: Court of Appeal in Chancery Act 1867 (30 & 31 Vict. c. 64)) to make further Provision for the Despatch of Business in the Court of Appeal in Chancery. (Repealed by Statute Law Revision and Civil Procedure Act 1881 (44 & 45 Vict. c. 59))
Fairs (Ireland) Act 1868	31 & 32 Vict. c. 12	30 March 1868
An Act to facilitate the Alteration of Days upon which, and of Places at which, Fairs are now held in Ireland.
Consolidated Fund (£6,000,000) Act or the Supply (No. 2) Act 1868 (repealed)	31 & 32 Vict. c. 13	3 April 1868
An Act to apply the sum of Six million Pounds out of the Consolidated Fund to the Service of the Year ending on the Thirty-first Day of March One thousand eight hundred and sixty-nine. (Repealed by Statute Law Revision Act 1875 (38 & 39 Vict. c. 66))
Mutiny Act 1868 (repealed)	31 & 32 Vict. c. 14	3 April 1868
An Act for punishing Mutiny and Desertion, and for the better Payment of the Army and their Quarters. (Repealed by Statute Law Revision Act 1875 (38 & 39 Vict. c. 66))
Marine Mutiny Act 1868 (repealed)	31 & 32 Vict. c. 15	3 April 1868
An Act for the Regulation of Her Majesty's Royal Marine Forces while on shore. (Repealed by Statute Law Revision Act 1875 (38 & 39 Vict. c. 66))
Consolidated Fund (£17,000,000) Act or the Supply (No. 3) Act 1868 (repealed)	31 & 32 Vict. c. 16	29 May 1868
An Act to apply the Sum of Seventeen million Pounds out of the Consolidated Fund to the Service of the Year ending on the Thirty-first Day of March One thousand eight hundred and sixty-nine. (Repealed by Statute Law Revision Act 1875 (38 & 39 Vict. c. 66))
London Coal and Wine Duties Continuance Act 1868 (repealed)	31 & 32 Vict. c. 17	29 May 1868
An Act to farther continue and appropriate the London Coal and Wine Duties. (Repealed by Statute Law Revision Act 1893 (56 & 57 Vict. c. 14))
Railways (Extension of Time) Act 1868 (repealed)	31 & 32 Vict. c. 18	29 May 1868
An Act to give further Time for making certain Railways. (Repealed by Statute Law Revision Act 1875 (38 & 39 Vict. c. 66))
Dean and Chapter Act 1868 (repealed)	31 & 32 Vict. c. 19	29 May 1868
An Act for declaring valid certain Orders of Her Majesty in Council relating to the Ecclesiastical Commissioners for England and to the Deans and Chapters of certain Churches. (Repealed by Statute Law Revision Act 1893 (56 & 57 Vict. c. 14))
Legitimacy Declaration Act (Ireland) 1868 or the Legitimacy Declaration (Ireland) Act 1868	31 & 32 Vict. c. 20	29 May 1868
An Act to enable Persons in Ireland to establish Legitimacy and the Validity of Marriages, and the Right to be deemed Natural-born Subjects.
Prison Officers Compensation Act 1868 (repealed)	31 & 32 Vict. c. 21	29 May 1868
An Act to provide Compensation to Officers of certain discontinued Prisons. (Repealed by Statute Law Revision Act 1893 (56 & 57 Vict. c. 14))
Petty Sessions and Lock-up House Act 1868 (repealed)	31 & 32 Vict. c. 22	29 May 1868
An Act to amend the Law relating to Places for holding Petty Sessions and to Lock-up Houses for the temporary Confinement of Persons taken into Custody and not yet committed for Trial. (Repealed by Statute Law Revision Act 1966 (c. 5))
Frampton Mansel Marriage Act 1868 (repealed)	31 & 32 Vict. c. 23	29 May 1868
An Act to render valid Marriages heretofore solemnized in the Chapel of Ease of Frampton Mansel in the Parish of Sapperton in the County of Gloucester. (Repealed by Statute Law (Repeals) Act 1977 (c. 18))
Capital Punishment Amendment Act 1868 (repealed)	31 & 32 Vict. c. 24	29 May 1868
An Act to provide for carrying out of Capital Punishment within Prisons. (Repealed by Murder (Abolition of Death Penalty) Act 1965 (c. 71) and Human Rights Act 1998 (c. 42))
Industrial Schools Act (Ireland) 1868 or the Industrial Schools (Ireland) Act 1868 (repealed)	31 & 32 Vict. c. 25	29 May 1868
An Act to extend the Industrial Schools Act (Note: Industrial Schools Act 1866 (29 & 30 Vict. c. 118)) to Ireland. (Repealed by Children Act 1908 (8 Edw. 7. c. 67))
Indian Railway Companies Act 1868 (repealed)	31 & 32 Vict. c. 26	29 May 1868
An Act to enable certain guaranteed Indian Railway Companies to raise Money on Debenture Stock. (Repealed by Statute Law Revision Act 1964 (c. 79))
Exchequer Bonds Act 1868 (repealed)	31 & 32 Vict. c. 27	29 May 1868
An Act for raising the Sum of One million six hundred thousand Pounds by Exchequer Bonds for the Service of the Year ending on the Thirty-first Day of March One thousand eight hundred and sixty-nine. (Repealed by Statute Law Revision Act 1875 (38 & 39 Vict. c. 66))
Revenue Act 1868 or the Customs and Income Tax Act 1868 (repealed)	31 & 32 Vict. c. 28	29 May 1868
An Act to grant certain Duties of Customs and Income Tax. (Repealed by Customs Consolidation Act 1876 (39 & 40 Vict. c. 36) and Income Tax Act 1918 (8 & 9 Geo. 5. c. 40))
Medical Act Amendment Act 1868 (repealed)	31 & 32 Vict. c. 29	29 May 1868
An Act to amend the Law relating to Medical Practitioners in the Colonies. (Repealed by Medical Act 1886 (49 & 50 Vict. c. 48))
United Parishes (Scotland) Act 1868 (repealed)	31 & 32 Vict. c. 30	29 May 1868
An Act to amend the Act of the Seventh and Eighth Years of the Reign of Victoria, Chapter Forty-four, (Note: New Parishes (Scotland) Act 1844 (7 & 8 Vict. c. 44)) relating to the Formation of quoad sacra Parishes in Scotland, and to repeal the Act of the Twenty-ninth and Thirtieth Years of the Reign of Victoria, Chapter Seventy-seven. (Note: Parishes Quoad Sacra (Scotland) Act 1866 (29 & 30 Vict. c. 77)) (Repealed by Abolition of Feudal Tenure etc. (Scotland) Act 2000 (asp 5))
Stockbrokers (Ireland) Act 1868 (repealed)	31 & 32 Vict. c. 31	25 June 1868
An Act to amend the Act passed in the Session of Parliament held in Ireland in the Thirty-ninth Year of the Reign of His Majesty King George the Third, intituled "An Act for the better Regulation of Stockbrokers." (Note: Stock Exchange (Dublin) Act 1799 (39 Geo. 3. c. 60 (I))) (Repealed by Statute Law Revision Act (Northern Ireland) 1954 (c. 35 (N.I.)))
Endowed Schools Act 1868 (repealed)	31 & 32 Vict. c. 32	25 June 1868
An Act for annexing Conditions to the Appointment of Persons to Offices in certain Schools. (Repealed by Statute Law (Repeals) Act 1971 (c. 52))
Cotton Statistics Act 1868 (repealed)	31 & 32 Vict. c. 33	25 June 1868
An Act for the Collection and Publication of Cotton Statistics. (Repealed by Cotton Industry Act 1923 (13 & 14 Geo. 5. c. 22))
Writs Registration (Scotland) Act 1868	31 & 32 Vict. c. 34	25 June 1868
An Act to alter some provisions in the existing Acts as to registration of writs in certain registers in Scotland.
Duchy of Cornwall Management Act 1868	31 & 32 Vict. c. 35	25 June 1868
An Act to extend the Provision in "The Duchy of Cornwall Management Act 1863," (Note: Duchy of Cornwall Management Act 1863 (26 & 27 Vict. c. 49)) relating to permanent Improvements.
Alkali Act 1868 (repealed)	31 & 32 Vict. c. 36	25 June 1868
An Act to make perpetual the Alkali Act 1863. (Repealed by Statute Law Revision Act 1878 (41 & 42 Vict. c. 79) and Alkali, &c. Works Regulation Act 1881 (44 & 45 Vict. c. 37))
Documentary Evidence Act 1868	31 & 32 Vict. c. 37	25 June 1868
An Act to amend the Law relating to Documentary Evidence in certain Cases.
Indian Prize Money Act 1868 (repealed)	31 & 32 Vict. c. 38	25 June 1868
An Act for the Appropriation of certain unclaimed Shares of Prize Money acquired by Soldiers and Seamen in India. (Repealed by Statute Law Revision Act 1959 (7 & 8 Eliz. 2. c. 68))
Jurors Affirmation (Scotland) Act 1868 (repealed)	31 & 32 Vict. c. 39	25 June 1868
An Act to give Relief to Jurors who may refuse or be unwilling from alleged conscientious Motives to be sworn in Civil or Criminal Proceedings in Scotland. (Repealed by Oaths Act 1888 (51 & 52 Vict. c. 46))
Partition Act 1868	31 & 32 Vict. c. 40	25 June 1868
An Act to amend the Law relating to Partition. (Repealed for England and Wales by Law of Property Act 1925 (15 & 16 Geo. 5. c. 20))
Borough Electors Act 1868 (repealed)	31 & 32 Vict. c. 41	13 July 1868
An Act to make Provision in the Case of Boroughs ceasing to return Members to serve in Parliament respecting Rights of Election which have been vested in Persons entitled to vote for such Members. (Repealed by Municipal Corporations Act 1882 (45 & 46 Vict. c. 50))
Municipal Rate (Edinburgh) Act 1868 (repealed)	31 & 32 Vict. c. 42	13 July 1868
An Act to amend the Act of the Twenty-third and Twenty-fourth Years of the Reign of Her Majesty, Chapter Fifty, (Note: Annuity Tax Abolition Act 1860 (23 & 24 Vict. c. 50)) by abolishing the Rate imposed by the said Act on all Occupiers of Premises within the extended Municipal Boundaries of the City of Edinburgh. (Repealed by Statute Law (Repeals) Act 1975 (c. 10))
Thames Embankment and Metropolis Improvement (Loans) Act 1868 or the Thames Embankment, etc. (Loans) Act 1868 (repealed)	31 & 32 Vict. c. 43	13 July 1868
An Act for extending the Provisions of The Thames Embankment and Metropolis Improvement (Loans) Act, 1864, (Note: Thames Embankment and Metropolis Improvement (Loans) Act 1864 (27 & 28 Vict. c. 61)) and for amending the Powers of the Metropolitan Board of Works in relation to Loans under that Act. (Repealed by Metropolitan Board of Works (Loans) Act 1869 (32 & 33 Vict. c. 102))
Building Sites for Religious and Other Purposes Act 1868 (repealed)	31 & 32 Vict. c. 44	13 July 1868
An Act for facilitating the Acquisition and Enjoyment of Sites for Buildings for Religions, Educational, Literary, Scientific, and other Charitable Purposes. (Repealed by Statute Law Revision Act 1893 (56 & 57 Vict. c. 14))
Sea Fisheries Act 1868 (repealed)	31 & 32 Vict. c. 45	13 July 1868
An Act to carry into effect a Convention between Her Majesty and the Emperor of the French concerning the Fisheries in the Seas adjoining the British Islands and France, and to amend the Laws relating to British Sea Fisheries. (Repealed by Deregulation Act 2015 (c. 20))
Boundary Act 1868 (repealed)	31 & 32 Vict. c. 46	13 July 1868
An Act to settle and describe the Limits of certain Boroughs and the Divisions of certain Counties in England and Wales, in so far as respects the Election of Members to serve in Parliament. (Repealed by Representation of the People Act 1948 (11 & 12 Geo. 6. c. 65))
Consecration of Churchyards Act 1868 (repealed)	31 & 32 Vict. c. 47	13 July 1868
An Act to amend "The Consecration of Churchyards Act 1867." (Note: Consecration of Churchyards Act 1867 (30 & 31 Vict. c. 133)) (Repealed by Ecclesiastical Jurisdiction and Care of Churches Measure 2018 (No. 3))
Representation of the People (Scotland) Act 1868	31 & 32 Vict. c. 48	13 July 1868
An Act for the Amendment of the Representation of the People in Scotland.
Representation of the People (Ireland) Act 1868 (repealed)	31 & 32 Vict. c. 49	13 July 1868
An Act to amend the Representation of the People in Ireland. (Repealed by Representation of the People Act 1949 (12, 13 & 14 Geo. 6. c. 68))
Lanark Prisons Act 1868 or the Prisons (Scotland) Administration Acts (Lanarkshire) Amendment Act 1868 (repealed)	31 & 32 Vict. c. 50	13 July 1868
An Act to amend the Acts for the Administration of Prisons in Scotland in so far as regards the County of Lanark; and for other Purposes. (Repealed by Statute Law Revision Act 1893 (56 & 57 Vict. c. 14) and Statute Law Revision Act 1950 (14 Geo. 6. c. 6))
Fairs Act 1868 (repealed)	31 & 32 Vict. c. 51	13 July 1868
An Act to amend the Law relating to Fairs in England and Wales. (Repealed by Fairs Act 1873 (36 & 37 Vict. c. 37))
Vagrant Act Amendment Act 1868 (repealed)	31 & 32 Vict. c. 52	13 July 1868
An Act to amend the Act for punishing idle and disorderly Persons, and Rogues and Vagabonds, (Note: Vagrancy Act 1824 (5 Geo. 4. c. 83)) so far as relates to the Use of Instruments of Gaming. (Repealed by Vagrant Act Amendment Act 1873 (36 & 37 Vict. c. 38))
Medway Regulation Continuance Act 1868	31 & 32 Vict. c. 53	13 July 1868
An Act to continue In force an Act of the Second Year of King George the Second, Chapter Nineteen, (Note: Medway Oyster Fishery Act 1728 (2 Geo. 2. c. 19)) for the better Regulation of the Oyster Fishery in the River Medway.
Judgments Extension Act 1868 (repealed)	31 & 32 Vict. c. 54	13 July 1868
An Act to render Judgments or Decreets obtained in certain Courts in England, Scotland, and Ireland respectively effectual in any other Part of the United Kingdom. (Repealed by Civil Jurisdiction and Judgments Act 1982 (c. 27))
Courts of Law Fees (Scotland) Act 1868 (repealed)	31 & 32 Vict. c. 55	13 July 1868
An Act to provide for the Collection by means of Stamps of Fees payable in the Supreme and Inferior Courts of Law in Scotland, and in the Offices belonging thereto ; and for other Purposes relative thereto. (Repealed by Public Offices Fees Act 1879 (42 & 43 Vict. c. 58))
Petroleum Act 1868 (repealed)	31 & 32 Vict. c. 56	13 July 1868
An Act to amend the Act Twenty-fifth and Twenty-sixth Victoria, Chapter Sixty-six, (Note: Petroleum Act 1862 (25 & 26 Vict. c. 66)) for the safe keeping of Petroleum. (Repealed by Petroleum Act 1871 (34 & 35 Vict. c. 105))
Legislative Council, New Zealand Act 1868 (repealed)	31 & 32 Vict. c. 57	13 July 1868
An Act to make Provision for the Appointment of Members of the Legislative Council of New Zealand, and to remove Doubts in respect of past Appointments. (Repealed by Statute Law Revision Act 1893 (56 & 57 Vict. c. 14))
Parliamentary Electors Registration Act 1868 (repealed)	31 & 32 Vict. c. 58	16 July 1868
An Act to amend the Law of Registration so far as relates to the Year One thousand eight hundred and sixty-eight, and for other Purposes relating thereto. (Repealed by Representation of the People Act 1948 (11 & 12 Geo. 6. c. 65))
Irish Reformatory Schools Act 1868 (repealed)	31 & 32 Vict. c. 59	16 July 1868
An Act to amend the Law relating to Reformatory Schools in Ireland. (Repealed by Children Act 1908 (8 Edw. 7. c. 67) and Children and Young Persons Act (Northern Ireland) 1950 (c. 5 (N.I.)))
Curragh of Kildare Act 1868 (repealed)	31 & 32 Vict. c. 60	16 July 1868
An Act to make better Provision for the Management and Use of the Curragh of Kildare. (Repealed by Statute Law (Repeals) Act 1993 (c. 50))
Consular Marriage Act 1868 (repealed)	31 & 32 Vict. c. 61	16 July 1868
An Act for removing Doubts as to the Validity of certain Marriages between British Subjects in China and elsewhere, and for amending the Law relating to the Marriage of British Subjects in Foreign Countries. (Repealed by Foreign Marriage Act 1892 (55 & 56 Vict. c. 23))
Renewable Leaseholds Conversion (Ireland) Act 1868 (repealed)	31 & 32 Vict. c. 62	16 July 1868
An Act to extend the Provisions of The Renewable Leasehold Conversion (Ireland) Act (Note: Renewable Leasehold Conversion Act 1849 (12 & 13 Vict. c. 105)) to certain Leasehold Tenures in Ireland. (Repealed by Property (Northern Ireland) Order 1978 (SI 1978/459 (N.I. 4)))
Bank of Bombay Failure Commissioners Act 1868 (repealed)	31 & 32 Vict. c. 63	16 July 1868
An Act to enable Commissioners appointed to inquire into the Failure of the Bank of Bombay to examine Witnesses on Oath in the United Kingdom. (Repealed by Statute Law Revision Act 1875 (38 & 39 Vict. c. 66))
Land Registers (Scotland) Act 1868	31 & 32 Vict. c. 64	31 July 1868
An Act to improve the system of registration of writs relating to heritable property in Scotland.
Universities Elections Act 1868 or the Universities Election Act 1868 (repealed)	31 & 32 Vict. c. 65	31 July 1868
An Act to amend the Law relating to the Use of Voting Papers in Elections for the Universities. (Repealed by Representation of the People Act 1918 (7 & 8 Geo. 5. c. 64))
Turnpike Trusts Arrangements Act 1868 (repealed)	31 & 32 Vict. c. 66	31 July 1868
An Act to confirm certain Provisional Orders made under an Act of the Fifteenth Year of the Reign of Her present Majesty, (Note: Turnpike Trusts (Making of Provisional Orders) Act 1851 (14 & 15 Vict. c. 38)) to facilitate Arrangements for the Belief of Turnpike Trusts. (Repealed by Statute Law (Repeals) Act 1981 (c. 19))
Police Rate Act 1868 (repealed)	31 & 32 Vict. c. 67	31 July 1868
An Act to amend the Law relating to the Funds provided for defraying the Expenses of the Metropolitan Police. (Repealed by Local Government Act 1948 (11 & 12 Geo. 6. c. 26))
Liquidation Act 1868 (repealed)	31 & 32 Vict. c. 68	31 July 1868
An Act to facilitate Liquidation in certain Cases of Bankruptcy Arrangement and Winding-up. (Repealed by Statute Law Revision Act 1953 (2 & 3 Eliz. 2. c. 5))
Libel Act (Ireland) 1868 or the Libel (Ireland) Act 1868 (repealed)	31 & 32 Vict. c. 69	31 July 1868
An Act to assimilate the Law in Ireland to the Law in England as to Costs in Actions of Libel. (Repealed by Statute Law Revision Act 1893 (56 & 57 Vict. c. 14))
Railways Traverse Act 1868 or the Railways Traverse Act (repealed)	31 & 32 Vict. c. 70	31 July 1868
An Act to amend the Railways (Ireland) Act, 1851, (Note: Railways (Ireland) Act 1851 (14 & 15 Vict. c. 70)) the Railways (Ireland) Act, 1860, (Note: Railways (Ireland) Act 1860 (23 & 24 Vict. c. 97)) and the Railways (Ireland) Act, 1864, (Note: Railways (Ireland) Act 1864 (27 & 28 Vict. c. 71)) as to the Trial of Traverses. (Repealed by Judicature (Northern Ireland) Act 1978 (c. 23))
County Courts Admiralty Jurisdiction Act 1868 (repealed)	31 & 32 Vict. c. 71	31 July 1868
An Act for conferring Admiralty Jurisdiction on the County Courts. (Repealed by County Courts Act 1934 (24 & 25 Geo. 5. c. 53))
Promissory Oaths Act 1868	31 & 32 Vict. c. 72	31 July 1868
An Act to amend the Law relating to Promissory Oaths.
Revenue Officers' Disabilities Act 1868 (repealed)	31 & 32 Vict. c. 73	31 July 1868
An Act to relieve certain Officers employed in the Collection and Management of Her Majesty's Revenues from any legal Disability to vote at the Election of Members to serve in Parliament. (Repealed by Statute Law Revision Act 1875 (38 & 39 Vict. c. 66))
Poor Law Inspectors (Ireland) Act 1868 (repealed)	31 & 32 Vict. c. 74	31 July 1868
An Act to extend the Powers of Poor Law Inspectors and Medical Inspectors in Ireland. (Repealed by Statute Law Revision Act 1893 (56 & 57 Vict. c. 14) and Statute Law Revision Act (Northern Ireland) 1954 (c. 35 (N.I.)))
Juries Act (Ireland) 1868 or the Juries (Ireland) Act 1868 (repealed)	31 & 32 Vict. c. 75	31 July 1868
An Act to amend the Law relating to Petit Juries in Ireland. (Repealed by Statute Law Revision Act 1893 (56 & 57 Vict. c. 14))
Militia Pay Act 1868 (repealed)	31 & 32 Vict. c. 76	31 July 1868
An Act to defray the Charge of the Pay, Clothing, and contingent and other Expenses of the Disembodied Militia in Great Britain and Ireland; to grant Allowances in certain Cases to Subaltern Officers, Adjutants, Paymasters, Quartermasters, Surgeons, Assistant Surgeons, and Surgeons Mates of the Militia; and to authorize the Employment of the Non-commissioned Officers. (Repealed by Statute Law Revision Act 1875 (38 & 39 Vict. c. 66))
Divorce Amendment Act 1868 or the Matrimonial Causes Act 1868 (repealed)	31 & 32 Vict. c. 77	31 July 1868
An Act to amend the Law relating to Appeals from the Court of Divorce and Matrimonial Causes in England. (Repealed by Supreme Court of Judicature (Consolidation) Act 1925 (15 & 16 Geo. 5. c. 49))
Admiralty Suits Act 1868 (repealed)	31 & 32 Vict. c. 78	31 July 1868
An Act to amend the Law relating to Proceedings instituted by the Admiralty; and for other Purposes connected therewith. (Repealed for England and Wales and Scotland by Crown Proceedings Act 1947 (10 & 11 Geo. 6. c. 44) and for Northern Ireland by Northern Ireland (Crown Proceedings) Order 1949 (SI 1949/1836))
Railway Companies Act 1868 (repealed)	31 & 32 Vict. c. 79	31 July 1868
An Act to further amend the Law relating to Railway Companies. (Repealed by Railway Companies Act 1875 (38 & 39 Vict. c. 31))
Contagious Diseases (Ireland) Amendment Act 1868 (repealed)	31 & 32 Vict. c. 80	31 July 1868
An Act to amend The Contagious Diseases Act, 1866. (Note: Contagious Diseases Act 1866 (29 & 30 Vict. c. 35)) (Repealed by Contagious Diseases Acts Repeal Act 1886 (49 & 50 Vict. c. 10))
Portpatrick, etc., Railways Act 1868 (repealed)	31 & 32 Vict. c. 81	31 July 1868
An Act to authorize Loans of Public Money to the Portpatrick and the Belfast and County Down Railway Companies, and a Payment to the Portpatrick Company in consequence of the Abandonment of the Communication between Donaghadee and Portpatrick. (Repealed by Statute Law Revision Act 1950 (14 Geo. 6. c. 6))
County General Assessment (Scotland) Act 1868 (repealed)	31 & 32 Vict. c. 82	31 July 1868
An Act to abolish the Power of levying the Assessment known as "Rogue Money," and in lieu thereof to confer on the Commissioners of Supply of Counties in Scotland the Power of levying a "County General Assessment." (Repealed by Local Government (Scotland) Act 1889 (52 & 53 Vict. c. 50), Statute Law Revision Act 1893 (56 & 57 Vict. c. 14) and Local Government (Scotland) Act 1947 (10 & 11 Geo. 6. c. 43))
Army Chaplains Act 1868	31 & 32 Vict. c. 83	31 July 1868
An Act to afford greater Facilities for the Ministrations of Army Chaplains.
Entail Amendment (Scotland) Act 1868 (repealed)	31 & 32 Vict. c. 84	31 July 1868
An Act to amend in several particulars the law of entail in Scotland. (Repealed by Abolition of Feudal Tenure etc. (Scotland) Act 2000 (asp 5))
Appropriation Act 1868 (repealed)	31 & 32 Vict. c. 85	31 July 1868
An Act to apply a Sum out of the Consolidated Fund and the Surplus of Ways and Means to the Service of the Year ending the Thirty-first Day of March One thousand eight hundred and sixty-nine, and to appropriate the Supplies granted in this Session of Parliament. (Repealed by Statute Law Revision Act 1875 (38 & 39 Vict. c. 66))
Policies of Marine Assurance Act 1868 or the Policies of Marine Insurance Act 1868 (repealed)	31 & 32 Vict. c. 86	31 July 1868
An Act to enable Assignees of Marine Policies to sue thereon in their own Names. (Repealed by Marine Insurance Act 1906 (6 Edw. 7. c. 41))
Vaccination Amendment (Ireland) Act 1868 (repealed)	31 & 32 Vict. c. 87	31 July 1868
An Act to amend the Act of the Twenty-sixth and Twenty-seventh Years of the Reign of Her present Majesty, Chapter Fifty-two, intituled "An Act to further extend and make compulsory the Practice of Vaccination in Ireland." (Note: Vaccination (Ireland) Act 1863 (26 & 27 Vict. c. 52)) (Repealed by Vaccination (Repeals) Act (Northern Ireland) 1963 (c. 30 (N.I.)))
Court of Chancery and Exchequer Funds (Ireland) Act 1868 (repealed)	31 & 32 Vict. c. 88	31 July 1868
An Act for transferring (he Fee and other Funds of the Courts of Chancery and Exchequer in Ireland to the Consolidated Fund. (Repealed by Statute Law (Repeals) Act 1978 (c. 45))
Inclosure, &c. Expenses Act 1868	31 & 32 Vict. c. 89	31 July 1868
An Act to alter certain Provisions in the Acts for the Commutation of Tithes, the Copyhold Acts, and the Acts for the Inclosure, Exchange, and Improvement of Land; and to make Provision towards defraying the Expense of the Copyhold, Inclosure, and Tithe Office.
Administration Act 1868 (repealed)	31 & 32 Vict. c. 90	31 July 1868
An Act to empower certain Public Departments to pay otherwise than to Executors or Administrators small Sums due on account of Pay or Allowances to Persons deceased. (Repealed by Superannuation Act 1887 (50 & 51 Vict. c. 67))
Annuity (Lord Napier) Act 1868 (repealed)	31 & 32 Vict. c. 91	31 July 1868
An Act to settle an Annuity upon Lieutenant General Sir Robert Napier, G.C.B., G.C.S.I, and the next surviving Heir Male of his Body, in consideration of his eminent Services. (Repealed by Statute Law Revision Act 1953 (2 & 3 Eliz. 2. c. 5))
Provinces of New Zealand Act 1868 (repealed)	31 & 32 Vict. c. 92	31 July 1868
An Act to declare the Powers of the General Assembly of New Zealand to abolish any Province in that Colony, or to withdraw from any such Province any Part of the Territory thereof. (Repealed by Statute Law Revision Act 1893 (56 & 57 Vict. c. 14))
New Zealand Company Act 1868	31 & 32 Vict. c. 93	31 July 1868
An Act to remove Doubts respecting the Operation of the New Zealand Company's Act of the Ninth and Tenth Years of Victoria, Chapter Three hundred and eighty-two (Local and Personal). (Note: New Zealand Company Act 1846 (9 & 10 Vict. c. ccclxxxii))
Railway Companies (Ireland) Temporary Advances Act 1868 (repealed)	31 & 32 Vict. c. 94	31 July 1868
An Act to authorize the further Extension of the Period for Repayment of Advances made under The Railway Companies (Ireland) Temporary Advances Act, 1866. (Note: Railway Companies (Ireland) Temporary Advances Act 1866 (29 & 30 Vict. c. 95)) (Repealed by Statute Law Revision Act 1875 (38 & 39 Vict. c. 66))
Justiciary Court (Scotland) Act 1868 (repealed)	31 & 32 Vict. c. 95	31 July 1868
An Act to amend the Procedure in the Court of Justiciary and other Criminal Courts in Scotland. (Repealed by Statute Law (Repeals) Act 1989 (c. 43))
Ecclesiastical Buildings and Glebes (Scotland) Act 1868 or the Ecclesiastical Buildings and Glebes (Scotland) Act 1868 (repealed)	31 & 32 Vict. c. 96	31 July 1868
An Act to amend the Procedure in regard to Ecclesiastical Buildings and Glebes in Scotland. (Repealed by Abolition of Feudal Tenure etc. (Scotland) Act 2000 (asp 5))
Lunatic Asylums (Ireland) Accounts Audit Act 1868 (repealed)	31 & 32 Vict. c. 97	31 July 1868
An Act to make Provision for the Audit of Accounts of District Lunatic Asylums in Ireland. (Repealed by Local Government (Ireland) Act 1898 (61 & 62 Vict. c. 37))
Borough Clerks of the Peace (Ireland) Act 1868 (repealed)	31 & 32 Vict. c. 98	31 July 1868
An Act to make Provision for the Payment of Salaries to Clerks of the Peace and Clerks of the Crown in certain Boroughs in Ireland. (Repealed by Statute Law Revision Act (Northern Ireland) 1954 (c. 35 (N.I.)))
Annual Turnpike Acts Continuance Act 1868 (repealed)	31 & 32 Vict. c. 99	31 July 1868
An Act to continue certain Turnpike Acts in Great Britain, to repeal certain other Turnpike Acts, and to make further Provision concerning Turnpike Roads. (Repealed by Statute Law (Repeals) Act 1981 (c. 19))
Court of Session Act 1868	31 & 32 Vict. c. 100	31 July 1868
An Act to amend the Procedure in the Court of Session and the Judicial Arrangements in the Superior Courts of Scotland, and to make certain changes in the other Courts thereof.
Titles to Land Consolidation (Scotland) Act 1868	31 & 32 Vict. c. 101	31 July 1868
An Act to consolidate the Statutes relating to the constitution and completion of titles to heritable property in Scotland, and to make certain changes in the law of Scotland relating to heritable rights.
General Police and Improvement (Scotland) Act 1862 Amendment Act or the Police and Improvement (Scotland) Act 1868 or the General Police and Improvement (Scotland) Act 1868 (repealed)	31 & 32 Vict. c. 102	31 July 1868
An Act to alter the Qualifications of the Electors in Places in Scotland under The General Police and Improvement (Scotland) Act, 1862, (Note: General Police and Improvement (Scotland) Act 1862 (25 & 26 Vict. c. 101)) or under the Act Thirteen and Fourteen Victoria, Chapter Thirty-three, (Note: Police (Scotland) Act 1850 (13 & 14 Vict. c. 33)) and to amend the said Acts in certain other respects. (Repealed by Burgh Police (Scotland) Act 1892 (55 & 56 Vict. c. 55))
Burial (Ireland) Act 1868	31 & 32 Vict. c. 103	31 July 1868
An Act to amend the Law which regulates the Burials of Persons in Ireland not belonging to the Established Church.
Bankruptcy Amendment Act 1868 (repealed)	31 & 32 Vict. c. 104	31 July 1868
An Act to amend The Bankruptcy Act, 1861. (Note: Bankruptcy Act 1861 (24 & 25 Vict. c. 134)) (Repealed by Bankruptcy Repeal and Insolvent Court Act 1869 (32 & 33 Vict. c. 83))
Rupert's Land Act 1868 (repealed)	31 & 32 Vict. c. 105	31 July 1868
An Act for enabling Her Majesty to accept a Surrender upon Terms of the Lands, Privileges, and Rights of "The Governor and Company of Adventurers of England trading into Hudson's Bay" and for admitting the same into the Dominion of Canada. (Repealed by Statute Law Revision Act 1893 (56 & 57 Vict. c. 14))
Metropolitan Fairs Act 1868	31 & 32 Vict. c. 106	31 July 1868
An Act for the Prevention of the holding of unlawful Fairs within the Limits of the Metropolitan Police District.
Indictable Offences Act Amendment Act 1868	31 & 32 Vict. c. 107	31 July 1868
An Act to amend the Law relating to the Indorsing of Warrants in Scotland, Ireland, and the Channel Islands.
Municipal Elections Amendment (Scotland) Act 1868 (repealed)	31 & 32 Vict. c. 108	31 July 1868
An Act to amend the Laws for the Election of the Magistrates and Councils of Royal and Parliamentary Burghs in Scotland. (Repealed by Town Councils (Scotland) Act 1900 (63 & 64 Vict. c. 49))
Compulsory Church Rate Abolition Act 1868	31 & 32 Vict. c. 109	31 July 1868
An Act for the Abolition of compulsory Church Rates.
Telegraph Act 1868	31 & 32 Vict. c. 110	31 July 1868
An Act to enable Her Majesty's Postmaster General to acquire, work and maintain Electric Telegraphs.
Expiring Laws Continuance Act 1868 (repealed)	31 & 32 Vict. c. 111	31 July 1868
An Act to continue various expiring Laws. (Repealed by Statute Law Revision Act 1875 (38 & 39 Vict. c. 66))
Registration Amendment (Ireland) Act 1868 (repealed)	31 & 32 Vict. c. 112	31 July 1868
An Act to amend the Law of Registration in Ireland. (Repealed by Ballot Act 1872 (35 & 36 Vict. c. 33), Statute Law Revision Act 1893 (56 & 57 Vict. c. 14) and Representation of the People Act 1918 (7 & 8 Geo. 5. c. 64))
Confirmation of Marriages, Blakedown Chapel Act 1868 (repealed)	31 & 32 Vict. c. 113	31 July 1868
An Act to render valid Marriages heretofore solemnized in the Chapel of Ease called Saint James-the- Greater Chapel, Blakedown, in the Parish of Hagley in the County of Worcester. (Repealed by Statute Law (Repeals) Act 1977 (c. 18))
Ecclesiastical Commission Act 1868 (repealed)	31 & 32 Vict. c. 114	31 July 1868
An Act to amend the Law relating to the Ecclesiastical Commissioners for England. (Repealed by Church of England (Miscellaneous Provisions) Measure 1992 (No. 1))
Sanitary Act 1868 (repealed)	31 & 32 Vict. c. 115	31 July 1868
An Act to amend The Sanitary Act, 1866. (Note: Sanitary Act 1866 (29 & 30 Vict. c. 90)) (Repealed for England and Wales by Public Health Act 1875 (38 & 39 Vict. c. 55), for Ireland by Public Health (Ireland) Act 1878 (41 & 42 Vict. c. 52) and for London by Public Health (London) Act 1891 (54 & 55 Vict. c. 76))
Larceny Act 1868 (repealed)	31 & 32 Vict. c. 116	31 July 1868
An Act to amend the Law relating to Larceny and Embezzlement. (Repealed by Summary Jurisdiction Act 1879 (42 & 43 Vict. c. 49), Larceny Act 1916 (6 & 7 Geo. 5. c. 50) and Statute Law Revision Act 1950 (14 Geo. 6. c. 6))
Incumbents Act 1868 (repealed)	31 & 32 Vict. c. 117	31 July 1868
An Act to amend The District Church Tithes Act, 1865, (Note: District Church Tithes Act 1865 (28 & 29 Vict. c. 42)) and to secure Uniformity of Designation amongst Incumbents in certain Cases. (Repealed by Statute Law (Repeals) Act 1977 (c. 18))
Public Schools Act 1868	31 & 32 Vict. c. 118	31 July 1868
An Act to make further Provision for the good Government and Extension of certain Public Schools in England.
Regulation of Railways Act 1868	31 & 32 Vict. c. 119	31 July 1868
An Act to amend the Law relating to Railways.
West Indies (Salaries) Act 1868 (repealed)	31 & 32 Vict. c. 120	31 July 1868
An Act to relieve the Consolidated Fund from the Charge of the Salaries of future Bishops, Archdeacons, Ministers, and other Persons in the West Indies. (Repealed by Statute Law Revision Act 1875 (38 & 39 Vict. c. 66), Statute Law Revision Act 1893 (56 & 57 Vict. c. 14) and Statute Law Revision Act 1950 (14 Geo. 6. c. 6))
Pharmacy Act 1868 (repealed)	31 & 32 Vict. c. 121	31 July 1868
An Act to regulate the Sale of Poisons, and alter and amend The Pharmacy Act, 1852. (Note: Pharmacy Act 1852 (15 & 16 Vict. c. 56)) (Repealed by Pharmacy Act 1954 (2 & 3 Eliz. 2. c. 61))
Poor Law Amendment Act 1868 (repealed)	31 & 32 Vict. c. 122	31 July 1868
An Act to make further Amendments in the Laws for the Relief of the Poor in England and Wales. (Repealed by Local Government Act 1966 (c. 42))
Salmon Fisheries (Scotland) Act 1868	31 & 32 Vict. c. 123	31 July 1868
An Act to amend the Law relating to Salmon Fisheries in Scotland.
Inland Revenue Act 1868	31 & 32 Vict. c. 124	31 July 1868
An Act to amend the Laws relating to the Inland Revenue. (Repealed for England and Wales and Scotland by Inland Revenue Repeal Act 1870 (33 & 34 Vict. c. 99), Spirits Act 1880 (43 & 44 Vict. c. 24), Inland Revenue Regulation Act 1890 (53 & 54 Vict. c. 21), Statute Law Revision Act 1893 (56 & 57 Vict. c. 14), Finance Act 1949 (12, 13 & 14 Geo. 6. c. 47), Finance Act 1975 (c. 7) and Statute Law (Repeals) Act 1977 (c. 18))
Parliamentary Elections Act 1868 or the Election Petitions and Corrupt Practices at Elections Act 1868 or the Corrupt Practices Act 1868 (repealed)	31 & 32 Vict. c. 125	31 July 1868
An Act for amending the Laws relating to Election Petitions, and providing more effectually for the Prevention of corrupt Practices at Parliamentary Elections. (Repealed for Northern Ireland by Judicature (Northern Ireland) Act 1978 (c. 23), for Scotland by Court of Session Act 1988 (c. 36) and for England and Wales by Statute Law (Repeals) Act 1993 (c. 50))
Danube Works Loan Act 1868 (repealed)	31 & 32 Vict. c. 126	31 July 1868
An Act to enable Her Majesty the Queen to carry into effect a Convention made between Her Majesty and other Powers relative to a Loan for the Completion of Works for the Improvement of the Navigation of the Danube. (Repealed by Statute Law Revision Act 1950 (14 Geo. 6. c. 6))
Saint Mary Somerset's Church, London Act 1868	31 & 32 Vict. c. 127	31 July 1868
An Act to prevent the Removal of the Tower of the Church of Saint Mary Somerset in the City of London, and for vesting the said Tower and the Site thereof, and a Portion of the Burial Ground attached to the said Church, in the Corporation of the said City.
Ionian Islands Commissioners Act 1868 (repealed)	31 & 32 Vict. c. 128	31 July 1868
An Act to extend the Provisions of the Act Twenty-eighth and Twenty-ninth Victoria, Chapter One hundred and thirteen, (Note: Colonial Governors (Pensions) Act 1865 (28 & 29 Vict. c. 113)) to Persons who have held the Office of Lord High Commissioner of the Ionian Islands. (Repealed by Statute Law Revision Act 1875 (38 & 39 Vict. c. 66))
Colonial Shipping Act 1868 (repealed)	31 & 32 Vict. c. 129	31 July 1868
An Act to amend the Law relating to the Registration of Ships in British Possessions. (Repealed by Merchant Shipping Act 1894 (57 & 58 Vict. c. 60))
Artizans and Labourers Dwellings Act 1868 or Torrens' Act (repealed)	31 & 32 Vict. c. 130	31 July 1868
An Act to provide better Dwellings for Artizans and Labourers. (Repealed by Housing of the Working Classes Act 1890 (53 & 54 Vict. c. 70))

=== Local acts ===
Short title	Citation	Royal assent
Long title
Burry Port and Gwendreath Valley Railway Amendment Act 1868	31 & 32 Vict. c. i	29 May 1868
An Act for granting further Powers to the Burry Port and Gwewdreath Valley Railway Company.
Devon Valley Railway (Amendment) Act 1868	31 & 32 Vict. c. ii	29 May 1868
An Act to authorize a Diversion of the Line and Alteration of the Levels of the Devon Valley Railway; and for other Purposes.
Loughborough Gas Act 1868 (repealed)	31 & 32 Vict. c. iii	29 May 1868
An Act to make further Provision for lighting with Gras the Town and Parish of Loughborough in the County of Leicester; to incorporate the Loughborough Gas and Coke Company; and for other Purposes. (Repealed by Loughborough Corporation Act 1899 (62 & 63 Vict. c. cxcvii))
North London Railway Act 1868	31 & 32 Vict. c. iv	29 May 1868
An Act to confer certain additional Powers upon the North London Railway Company.
Grand Junction Waterworks Act 1868	31 & 32 Vict. c. v	29 May 1868
An Act to empower the Grand Junction Waterworks Company to raise further Money; to acquire additional Land; and for other Purposes.
Newquay and Cornwall Junction Railway Act 1868	31 & 32 Vict. c. vi	29 May 1868
An Act for authorizing a Deviation of the Newquay and Cornwall Junction Railway, and for extending the Time for the Completion of that Railway; and for conferring further Powers on the Newquay and Cornwall Junction Railway Company, and on Treffry's Trustees, with reference to the Newquay Railway; and for other Purposes.
Marylebone (Stingo Lane) Improvement Act 1868 (repealed)	31 & 32 Vict. c. vii	29 May 1868
An Act to enable the Metropolitan Board of Works to make Improvements in the Parish of Saint Marylebone in the County of Middlesex by forming a new Street in lieu of Stingo Lane from the Marylebone Road to Upper York Street. (Repealed by Local Law (Greater London Council and Inner London Boroughs) Order 1965 (SI 1965/540))
Tower Subway Act 1868	31 & 32 Vict. c. viii	29 May 1868
An Act to authorize the Construction of a Subway under the Thames from Tower Hill to the opposite Side of the River.
Oyster Fisheries Orders Confirmation Act 1868	31 & 32 Vict. c. ix	29 May 1868
An Act to confirm certain Orders made by the Board of Trade under The Oyster and Mussel Fisheries Act, 1866, (Note: Oyster and Mussel Fisheries Act 1866 (29 & 30 Vict. c. 85)) relating to the Rivers Blackwater (Essex) and Hamble.
	Blackwater (Essex) Oyster Fishery Order 1868 Order for the Establishment and Maintenance by the Fish and Oyster Breeding Company, Limited, of a several Oyster Fishery in the Estuary of the Tidal River Blackwater in the County of Essex.	
	Hamble Oyster Fishery Order 1868 Order for the Establishment and Maintenance by Thomas Warner, of Botley, and John Scovell, of Hamble, both in the County of Southampton, Merchants, of a several Oyster Fishery in the Estuary of the River Hamble in the County of Southampton.	
Local Government Supplemental Act 1868	31 & 32 Vict. c. x	29 May 1868
An Act to confirm certain Provisional Orders under The Local Government Act, 1858, (Note: Local Government Act 1858 (21 & 22 Vict. c. 98)) relating to the Districts of Workington, Walton-on-Hill, West Derby, Eton, Llanelly, Oxenhope and Stanbury, and Keighley, and for other Purposes relative to certain Districts under the said Act.
	Workington Order 1868 Provisional Order for extending the Borrowing Powers of the Workington Local Board.	
	Walton-on-the-Hill Order 1868 Provisional Order for separating from the District of Walton-on-the-Hill in the County of Lancaster a portion of the Township of Walton-on-the-Hill.	
	West Derby Order 1868 Provisional Order for altering the Boundaries of the District of West Derby in the County of Lancaster under the Provisions of the Local Government Act, 1858.	
	Eton Order 1868 Provisional Order for altering the Boundaries of the District of Eton in the County of Bucks under the Provisions of the Local Government Act, 1858.	
	Llanelly Order 1868 Provisional Order altering the Boundaries of the District of Llanelly, in the County of Carmarthen, under the Provisions of the Local Government Act, 1858.	
	Oxenhope and Stanbury Order 1868 Provisional Order for separating the Hamlet of Stanbury from the District of Oxenhope and Stanbury, in the County of York.	
	Keighley Order 1868 Provisional Order for altering the Boundaries of the District of the Parish and Township of Keighley, in the County of York, under the Provisions of the Local Government Act, 1858.	
Perth and Brechin Provisional Orders Confirmation Act 1868	31 & 32 Vict. c. xi	29 May 1868
An Act to confirm certain Provisional Orders under The General Police and Improvement (Scotland) Act, 1862, (Note: General Police and Improvement (Scotland) Act 1862 (25 & 26 Vict. c. 101)) relating to the Burghs of Perth and Brechin.
	Perth. General Police and Improvement (Scotland) Act, 1862, (25 & 26 Vict. c. 101.)	
	Brechin. General Police and Improvement (Scotland) Act, 1862, (25 & 26 Vict. c. 101.)	
	Perth. General Police and Improvement (Scotland) Act, 1862, (25 & 26 Vict. c. 101.)	
Broughty Ferry Provisional Order Confirmation Act 1868 (repealed)	31 & 32 Vict. c. xii	29 May 1868
An Act to confirm a Provisional Order under The General Police and Improvement (Scotland) Act, 1862, relating to the Burgh of Broughty Ferry. (Repealed by Dundee Boundaries Act 1913 (3 & 4 Geo. 5. c. lxxx))
	Broughty Ferry. General Police and Improvement (Scotland) Act, 1862, (25 & 26 Vict. c. 101.)	
Lewes Waterworks Act 1868 (repealed)	31 & 32 Vict. c. xiii	29 May 1868
An Act to authorize the Company of Proprietors of the Lewes Waterworks to raise more Money; and for other Purposes. (Repealed by Brighton (Lewes) Water Order 1958 (SI 1958/1482))
Buckfastleigh, Totnes and South Devon Railway Act 1868	31 & 32 Vict. c. xiv	29 May 1868
An Act to extend the Time for the compulsory Purchase of Lands, and for the Completion of the Buckfastleigh, Totnes, and South Devon Railway.
St. Saviour's Southwark Chaplaincy Act 1868 (repealed)	31 & 32 Vict. c. xv	29 May 1868
An Act to provide for the finding and maintaining of One Chaplain in lieu of Two in the Parish of Saint Saviour, Southwark; and for other Purposes. (Repealed by St. Saviour's Southwark (Church Rate Abolition) Act 1883 (46 & 47 Vict. c. xi))
Loughborough Local Board Act 1868	31 & 32 Vict. c. xvi	29 May 1868
An Act for enabling the Local Board of Health for the District of Loughborough in the County of Leicester to construct and maintain Waterworks and supply Water within the District; to hold and regulate Fairs and Markets; and for other Purposes.
Stourport Bridge Act 1868 (repealed)	31 & 32 Vict. c. xvii	29 May 1868
An Act for the altering, widening, and rebuilding a Bridge across the River Severn at Stourport in the County of Worcester, and for making further Provisions with respect to the said Bridge. (Repealed by Stourport Bridge Transfer Act 1892 (55 & 56 Vict. c. xxiii))
St. Luke's (King's Cross) District Act 1868	31 & 32 Vict. c. xviii	29 May 1868
An Act for facilitating Arrangements with respect to the new Parish of Saint Luke, King's Cross, and other new Parishes and Districts, with a view to better Provision for the Cure of Souls within the original Limits of the Parish of Saint Pancras in the County of Middlesex; and for other Purposes.
Dingwall and Skye Railway (Deviations) Act 1868	31 & 32 Vict. c. xix	29 May 1868
An Act to enable the Dingwall and Skye Railway Company to make Deviations of their authorized Line of Railway; and for other Purposes.
Brompton, Chatham, Gillingham and Rochester Waterworks Act 1868	31 & 32 Vict. c. xx	29 May 1868
An Act to authorize the Brompton, Chatham, Gillingham, and Rochester Waterworks Company to raise further Capital; and for other Purposes.
Carnarvon and Llanberis Railway Act 1868	31 & 32 Vict. c. xxi	29 May 1868
An Act to confer further Powers upon the Carnarvon and Llanberis Railway Company, and upon the London and North-western Railway Company, with respect to the Carnarvon and Llanberis Railway.
Lincoln Corporation (Canwick Common) Act 1868	31 & 32 Vict. c. xxii	29 May 1868
An Act for authorizing the Purchase by the Corporation of Lincoln of certain Common Rights, and the Diversion of a Road in Canwick Common, and the Sale of Portions of the said Common; and for other Purposes.
Hythe and Sandgate Gas Act 1868	31 & 32 Vict. c. xxiii	29 May 1868
An Act for incorporating the Hythe and Sandgate Gas and Coke Company (Limited), and defining the Limits of Supply of Gas by them, and regulating their Capital; and for other Purposes.
Leicester Improvement, Drainage and Markets Act 1868 (repealed)	31 & 32 Vict. c. xxiv	29 May 1868
An Act for empowering the Corporation of the Borough of Leicester to execute Works for Prevention of Floods on the River Soar and other Waters within the Borough, and additional Sewerage and Drainage Works, to make new Streets and Improvements, to establish a Vegetable Market, and to make Arrangements with the Visitors of the Leicestershire and Rutland Lunatic Asylum, and for establishing sanitary and other Regulations for the Borough; and for other Purposes. (Repealed by Leicestershire Act 1985 (c. xvii))
River Dee Company (Amendment) Act 1868	31 & 32 Vict. c. xxv	29 May 1868
An Act for enabling the Company of Proprietors of the Undertaking for recovering and preserving the Navigation of the River Dee to raise further Monies; and for other Purposes.
Cheshire Lines Act 1868	31 & 32 Vict. c. xxvi	29 May 1868
An Act to extend the Time for the Purchase of Lands for the Construction of the Chester and West Cheshire Junction Railway.
Leamington Priors Local Board (Extension of Powers) Act 1868 (repealed)	31 & 32 Vict. c. xxvii	29 May 1868
An Act to enable the Local Board of Health for the District of Leamington Priors in the County of Warwick to purchase the Property of the Leamington Royal Pump Room Company (Limited) at Leamington Priors, and to maintain a Pump Room and Baths and Public Gardens and Pleasure Grounds in Leamington Priors for the Use and Enjoyment of the Inhabitants thereof; and for other Purposes. (Repealed by Warwick District Council Act 1984 (c. xxiv))
Slough Waterworks Act 1868 (repealed)	31 & 32 Vict. c. xxviii	29 May 1868
An Act for supplying with Water the Parishes, Townships, and Places of Sloughy Upton-cum-Chalvey, Stoke Poges, Langley, Datehet, and Farnham Royal, in the County of Buckingham; and for other Purposes. (Repealed by Slough Waterworks Act 1875 (38 & 39 Vict. c. cxlvi))
Borough of Portsmouth Waterworks Act 1868	31 & 32 Vict. c. xxix	29 May 1868
An Act to authorize the Borough of Portsmouth Waterworks Company to make and maintain Works in connexion with their present Waterworks, and to raise more Money; and for other Purposes.
City of Dublin Steam Packet Company's Act 1868 (repealed)	31 & 32 Vict. c. xxx	29 May 1868
An Act to authorize "the City of Dublin Steam Packet Company" to make further Arrangements for the Investment of their Contingency Fund; and for other Purposes. (Repealed by Statute Law (Repeals) Act 2013 (c. 2))
Annual Inclosure Act 1868	31 & 32 Vict. c. xxxi	29 May 1868
An Act to authorize the Inclosure of certain Lands in pursuance of a Report of the Inclosure Commissioners for England and Wales.
Cork Gas Act 1868	31 & 32 Vict. c. xxxii	25 June 1868
An Act to dissolve and re-incorporate the Cork Gas Consumers Company, Limited, and to provide for lighting the City of Cork with Gas; and for other Purposes.
Cork Improvement Act 1868	31 & 32 Vict. c. xxxiii	25 June 1868
An Act to enable the Mayor, Aldermen, and Burgesses of the Borough of Cork to make a Diversion in the Line of the Cork, Blackrock, and Passage Railway; to authorize Agreements with the Harbour Commissioners; to define and extend the Powers of the Corporation in reference to Water Supply and Matters of local Government; to raise further Monies; to alter and amend the existing Acts relating to the Borough; and for other Purposes.
Haverfordwest Borough Act 1868	31 & 32 Vict. c. xxxiv	25 June 1868
An Act for improving the Supply of Water to the Borough of Haverfordwest, for facilitating the Recovery of Market and other Tolls and Dues leviable in the Borough, for improving the Recreation Ground of the Borough; and for other Purposes.
Farnworth and Kearsley Gas Act 1868	31 & 32 Vict. c. xxxv	25 June 1868
An Act to authorize the Farnworth and Kearsley Gas Company to raise additional Capital; and for other Purposes.
Merthyr Tydfil Stipendiary Magistrate Act 1868 (repealed)	31 & 32 Vict. c. xxxvi	25 June 1868
An Act to extend the Limits of the Act (Note: Merthyr Tydfil Justices of the Peace Act 1843 (6 & 7 Vict. c. xliv)) for appointing a Stipendiary Justice of the Peace for the Parish of Merthyr Tidvil and adjoining Places; and for other Purposes. (Repealed by Mid Glamorgan County Council Act 1987 (c. vii))
Vale of Towy Railway (Leasing) Act 1868	31 & 32 Vict. c. xxxvii	25 June 1868
An Act to enable the Knighton, the Central Wales, and the Central Wales Extension Railway Companies to take a Lease of the Vale of Towy Railway jointly with the Llanelly Railway and Dock Company; and for other Purposes.
London and North Western Railway (Knighton, Central Wales and Central Wales Extension Railways Transfer) Act 1868	31 & 32 Vict. c. xxxviii	25 June 1868
An Act for vesting the several Undertakings of the Knighton, the Central Wales, and the Central Wales Extension Railway Companies in the London and North-western Railway Company; and for other Purposes.
Glasgow and South Western Railway Act 1868	31 & 32 Vict. c. xxxix	25 June 1868
An Act to extend the Time for the Purchase of Lands for and for the Completion of certain of the Railways of the Glasgow and South-western Railway Company; and for other Purposes.
Brentford Gas Act 1868	31 & 32 Vict. c. xl	25 June 1868
An Act for enabling the Brentford Gas Company to raise additional Capital; to construct new Works; to vary and extend the Limits of Supply; and for other Purposes.
Burslem and Tunstall Gas Company's (Amendment) Act 1868	31 & 32 Vict. c. xli	25 June 1868
An Act to authorize the Burslem and Tunstall Gas Company to raise further Capital; and for other Purposes.
Clevedon Gas Act 1868	31 & 32 Vict. c. xlii	25 June 1868
An Act to incorporate the Clevedon Gas Company, and to make further Provision for lighting with Gas the Parish of Clevedon, and certain Parishes and Places in the Neighbourhood thereof, in the County of Somerset.
Midland Railway (Additional Powers) Act 1868	31 & 32 Vict. c. xliii	25 June 1868
An Act for conferring additional Powers on the Midland Railway Company for the raising of further Capital and the Construction of new Works; and for other Purposes.
Kennington Market Act 1868	31 & 32 Vict. c. xliv	25 June 1868
An Act for making and maintaining a Market in the Parish of St. Mary, Lambeth, in the County of Surrey.
Leeds New Gas Company's Act 1868 (repealed)	31 & 32 Vict. c. xlv	25 June 1868
An Act for authorizing the Leeds New Gas Company to raise further Money, and acquire additional Lands; and for other Purposes. (Repealed by Leeds Corporation (Consolidation) Act 1905 (5 Edw. 7. c. i))
Pier and Harbour Orders Confirmation Act 1868 (No. 1) or the Pier and Harbour Orders Confirmation (No. 1) Act 1868	31 & 32 Vict. c. xlvi	25 June 1868
An Act for confirming certain Provisional Orders made by the Board of Trade under The General Pier and Harbour Act, 1861, (Note: General Pier and Harbour Act 1861 (24 & 25 Vict. c. 45)) relating to Brightlingsea, Clevedon, Morecambe, Mousehole, Instow, Saltburn-by-the-Seay and Southport; and for amending The General Pier and Harbour Act, 1861.
	Brightlingsea Pier Order 1868 Order for the Construction, Maintenance, and Regulation of a Landing Place and Pier, with a Cut or Tidal Channel, at Brightlingsea in the County of Essex.	
	Clevedon Pier Order 1868 Order for amending "The Clevedon Pier Orders, 1864 and 1865."	
	Morecambe Pier Order 1868 Order for the Construction, Maintenance, and Regulation of a Pier at Morecambe in the County of Lancaster.	
	Mousehole Harbour Improvement Order 1868 Order for the Improvement and Regulation of the Harbour of Mousehole in the County of Cornwall.	
	North Devon Dock Order 1868 Order for extending the Time for Construction of Docks at Instow in the County of Devon.	
	Saltburn-by-the-Sea Pier Order 1868 Order for the Construction, Maintenance, and Regulation of a Pier at Saltburn-by-the-Sea in the North Riding of the County of York.	
	Southport Pier Order 1868 Order for enabling Tolls and Rates to be levied by the Southport Pier Company at their Pier at Southport, in the Port of Liverpool and County of Lancaster.	
Pier and Harbour Orders Confirmation Act 1868 (No. 2) or the Pier and Harbour Orders Confirmation (No. 2) Act 1868	31 & 32 Vict. c. xlvii	25 June 1868
An Act for confirming certain Provisional Orders made by the Board of Trade under The General Pier and Harbour Act, 1861, relating to Carlingford Lough, Elgin and Lossiemouth, Greenock, Hunstanton, Tenby, and Torquay.
	Harbour of Carlington Lough Improvement Order 1868 Order for the Amendment of the Harbour of Carlingford Lough Improvement Order, 1864.	
	Elgin and Lossiemouth Harbour Order 1868 Order for amending "The Elgin and Lossiemouth Harbour Act, 1856," (Note: Elgin and Lossiemouth Harbour Act 1856 (19 & 20 Vict. c. lxvii)) and making further Provision for the Maintenance and Regulation of that Harbour.	
	Greenock Harbour Order 1868 Order for enabling the Trustees of the Port and Harbours of Greenock to lease portions of their Lands.	
	Hunstanton Pier Order 1868 Order for the Construction, Maintenance, and Regulation of a Pier at Hunstanton, in the County of Norfolk.	
	Tenby Iron Pier Order 1868 Order for the Construction, Maintenance, and Regulation of an Iron Pier at Tenby, in the County of Pembroke.	
	Torquay Harbour Order 1868 Order for the Amendment of the Torquay Harbour Order, 1864.	
Yeadon and Guiseley Gas Act 1868	31 & 32 Vict. c. xlviii	25 June 1868
An Act for dissolving and re-incorporating the Proprietors of the Yeadon and Guiseley Gaslight and Coke Company; and for other Purposes.
Midland and London and North Western Railways (Ashby and Nuneaton Railway) Act 1868	31 & 32 Vict. c. xlix	25 June 1868
An Act to confer further Powers on the Midland and London and North-western Railway Companies for the Construction of Works in connexion with their Ashby and Nuneaton Railway; and for other Purposes.
North and South Western Junction Railway Act 1868	31 & 32 Vict. c. l	25 June 1868
An Act for authorizing the North and South Western Junction Railway Company to make a Deviation or Alteration in their Main Line of Railway; to raise further Monies; and for other Purposes.
Uxbridge and Rickmansworth Railway (Further Time) Act 1868 (repealed)	31 & 32 Vict. c. li	25 June 1868
An Act to extend the Time for the Purchase of Lands, and for the Completion of the Uxbridge and Rickmansworth Railway. (Repealed by Statute Law (Repeals) Act 2013 (c. 2))
Acton and Brentford Railway (Extension of Time) Act 1868	31 & 32 Vict. c. lii	25 June 1868
An Act to extend the Time for the Purchase of Lands, and for the Completion of the Acton and Brentford Railway.
Great Northern Railway Act 1868	31 & 32 Vict. c. liii	25 June 1868
An Act to authorize the Construction by the Great Northern Railway Company of a new Road in the Town of Leeds; and for other Purposes.
Great Western Railway (Dividends) Act 1868	31 & 32 Vict. c. liv	25 June 1868
An Act to confirm the Issue of Stocks and Shares of the Great Western Railway Company in Payment of Dividends to the Holders of Stocks or Shares in the Company.
West Riding and Grimsby Railway (Abandonment) Act 1868 (repealed)	31 & 32 Vict. c. lv	25 June 1868
An Act to repeal The West Riding and Grimsby Railway (Extension) Act, 1865. (Note: West Riding and Grimsby Railway (Extension) Act 1865 (28 & 29 Vict. c. cccxxi)) (Repealed by Statute Law (Repeals) Act 2013 (c. 2))
Ystrad Gas and Water Act 1868 (repealed)	31 & 32 Vict. c. lvi	25 June 1868
An Act to incorporate the Ystrad Gas and Water Company, Limited, and to make Provisions for the Supply of Gas and Water in the Parish of Ystradyfodwg in the County of Glamorgan; and for other Purposes. (Repealed by Rhondda Corporation Act 1973 (c. xxiii))
Alexandra (Newport) Dock Act 1868	31 & 32 Vict. c. lvii	25 June 1868
An Act for amending the Provisions of The Alexandra (Newport) Dock Act, 1865, (Note: Alexandra (Newport) Dock Act 1865 (28 & 29 Vict. c. ccclxxvii)) with respect to the borrowing Powers of the Alexandra (Newport) Dock Company; and for other Purposes.
Humber Conservancy Act 1868	31 & 32 Vict. c. lviii	25 June 1868
An Act to incorporate the Number Conservancy Commissioners, and to make Provision for a Lease to them of Foreshores of the Humber and the Estuary thereof between the Confluence into the same of the Rivers Ouse and Trent and the Sea, and to amend the Enactments relating to the Commissioners; and for other Purposes.
Oxford Police Act 1868 (repealed)	31 & 32 Vict. c. lix	25 June 1868
An Act for the Establishment of a united Constabulary Force in and for the University and City of Oxford. (Repealed by Statute Law (Repeals) Act 2008 (c. 12))
Caversham Bridge Act 1868 (repealed)	31 & 32 Vict. c. lx	25 June 1868
An Act to empower the Corporation of Beading to alter and Improve or rebuild Caversham Bridge in the Counties of Berks and Oxford; and for other Purposes. (Repealed by Berkshire Act 1986 (c. ii))
Reading Waterworks Act 1868 (repealed)	31 & 32 Vict. c. lxi	25 June 1868
An Act to amend and enlarge the Provisions of The Reading Waterworks Act, 1851; (Note: Reading Waterworks Act 1851 (14 & 15 Vict. c. lxx)) to make further and better Provision for supplying the Town of Beading and the adjoining Districts with Water ; and for other Purposes. (Repealed by Reading and Berkshire Water, &c. Act 1959 (7 & 8 Eliz. 2. c. xxxiii))
Dublin, Wicklow and Wexford Railway Act 1868	31 & 32 Vict. c. lxii	25 June 1868
An Act to extend the Time for constructing the Wexford Branch and the Kingstown Connecting Branch of the Dublin, Wicklow, and Wexford Railway Company; to make Arrangements as to the Capital of the Company; and for other Purposes.
North British Railway (Forth Railway) Act 1868	31 & 32 Vict. c. lxiii	25 June 1868
An Act to authorize the Abandonment of certain Portions of the Railways authorized by The North British and Edinburgh and Glasgow (Bridge of Forth) Railways Act, 1865; (Note: North British and Edinburgh and Glasgow (Bridge of Forth) Railways Act 1865 (28 & 29 Vict. c. ccxiii)) also an Extension of Time for the compulsory Purchase of Lands and the Completion of other Portions of the said Railways; and for other Purposes.
Lancashire and Yorkshire Railway (Extension of Time, &c.) Act 1868	31 & 32 Vict. c. lxiv	25 June 1868
An Act to extend the Time for the Purchase of Lands for and the Construction of the Railways authorized by The Lancashire and Yorkshire Railway (Ripponden and Stainland Branches, &c.) Act, 1865; (Note: Lancashire and Yorkshire Railway (Ripponden and Stainland Branches, &c.) Act 1865 (28 & 29 Vict. c. cccxxxii)) to empower the Lancashire and Yorkshire Railway Company to subscribe to the Hull Docks; and for other Purposes.
Bristol and Exeter Railway Act 1868	31 & 32 Vict. c. lxv	25 June 1868
An Act for further regulating the Capital of the Bristol and Exeter Railway Company, and for authorizing the Abandonment of the Tiverton and North Devon Railway; for extending the Time for making the Brean Railway; and for other Purposes.
Peterborough Gas Act 1868	31 & 32 Vict. c. lxvi	25 June 1868
An Act for incorporating and granting certain Powers to the Peterborough Gas Company.
Chichester Cattle Market Act 1868	31 & 32 Vict. c. lxvii	25 June 1868
An Act to authorize the Corporation of Chichester to remove the present Cattle Market, and to provide a new Cattle Market; and for other Purposes.
Downpatrick, Dundrum and Newcastle Railway Act 1868	31 & 32 Vict. c. lxviii	25 June 1868
An Act to amend The Downpatrick, Dundrum, and Newcastle Railway Act, 1866. (Note: Downpatrick, Dundrum and Newcastle Railway Act 1866 (29 & 30 Vict. c. ccclxii))
South Western Railway (General) Act 1868	31 & 32 Vict. c. lxix	25 June 1868
An Act to extend the Time for completing certain of the authorized Works of the London and South-Western Railway Company; and for other Purposes.
Maryport District and Harbour Act 1868	31 & 32 Vict. c. lxx	25 June 1868
An Act for altering and amending The Maryport Improvement and Harbour Act, 1866; (Note: Maryport Improvement and Harbour Act 1866 (29 & 30 Vict. c. ccxlv)) for authorizing new Works and extending the Powers of the Trustees; and for other Purposes.
Ilfracombe Railway (Abandonment) Act 1868 (repealed)	31 & 32 Vict. c. lxxi	25 June 1868
An Act for the Abandonment of the Undertaking of the Ilfracombe Railway Company, and for the Dissolution of that Company; and for other Purposes. (Repealed by Statute Law (Repeals) Act 2013 (c. 2))
Sunderland and South Shields Water Act 1868	31 & 32 Vict. c. lxxii	25 June 1868
An Act for enabling the Sunderland and South Shields Water Company to extend their Works and their Supply of Water, and to raise additional Capital; and for other Purposes.
Potteries, Shrewsbury and North Wales Railway Act 1868	31 & 32 Vict. c. lxxiii	25 June 1868
An Act to enable the Potteries and Shrewsbury and North Wales Railway Company to make a substituted Line of Railway, and to abandon a Portion of their authorized Railway; and for other Purposes.
Calverley and Horsforth District Gas Act 1868 (repealed)	31 & 32 Vict. c. lxxiv	25 June 1868
An Act for dissolving the Calverley Gas Company (Limited) and the Horsforth Gas Company, and incorporating a Company for supplying with Gas certain Parts of the Parishes of Calverley, Guiseley, and Addle, in the West Riding of the County of York. (Repealed by West Yorkshire Act 1980 (c. xiv))
Newton Market Act 1868 or the Newton Abbot Market Act 1868	31 & 32 Vict. c. lxxv	25 June 1868
An Act for empowering the Local Board for the District of Wolborough in the County of Devon to acquire Market and Fair Rights and Tolls, and to establish and hold Markets and Fairs; and for other Purposes.
Chichester Gas Act 1868	31 & 32 Vict. c. lxxvi	25 June 1868
An Act for better supplying with Gas the City of Chichester and adjoining Places; and for other Purposes.
Merthyr Tydfil Gas Act 1868	31 & 32 Vict. c. lxxvii	25 June 1868
An Act to incorporate the Merthyr Tydfil Gas Company, and to confer upon them Powers and make Provisions for more effectually supplying with Gas the Town of Merthyr Tydfil and its Neighbourhood; and for other Purposes.
Topsham, Woodbury and Lympstone Waterworks Act 1868	31 & 32 Vict. c. lxxviii	25 June 1868
An Act for better supplying with Water the Parishes of Topsham, Clyst Saint George, Woodbury, and Lympstone, in the County of Devon.
Warrington Waterworks Act 1868	31 & 32 Vict. c. lxxix	25 June 1868
An Act to amend and enlarge the Provisions of The Warrington Waterworks Act, 1855; (Note: Warrington Waterworks Act 1855 (18 & 19 Vict. c. xciii)) to extend the Limits of the Company for the Supply of Water; to make further and better Provision for supplying Warrington and the adjoining Districts with Water; and for other Purposes.
Metropolitan Subways Act 1868	31 & 32 Vict. c. lxxx	25 June 1868
An Act to make Provision respecting the Use of Subways constructed by the Metropolitan Board of Works in the Metropolis.
Reading Local Board Waterworks Act 1868 (repealed)	31 & 32 Vict. c. lxxxi	13 July 1868
An Act to enable the Local Board of Health in and for the District of the Borough of Reading to acquire the Undertaking of the Reading Waterworks Company; and for other Purposes. (Repealed by Reading and Berkshire Water, &c. Act 1959 (7 & 8 Eliz. 2. c. xxxiii))
Second Annual Inclosure Act 1868	31 & 32 Vict. c. lxxxii	13 July 1868
An Act to authorize the Inclosure of certain Lands in pursuance of a Special Report of the Inclosure Commissioners for England and Wales.
Land Drainage Supplemental Act 1868	31 & 32 Vict. c. lxxxiii	13 July 1868
An Act to confirm a Provisional Order under The Drainage Act, 1861. (Note: Land Drainage Act 1861 (24 & 25 Vict. c. 133))
	In the Matter of Aller Moor Improvement, situate in the Parishes of Aller, Othery, and Lyng, in the County of Somerset.	
Local Government Act 1868 (No. 2) or the Local Government (No. 2) Act 1868 or the Local Government Supplemental (No. 2) Act 1868	31 & 32 Vict. c. lxxxiv	13 July 1868
An Act to confirm certain Provisional Orders under The Local Government Act, 1858, relating to the Districts of Southampton, Bradford, Whitchurch and Dodington, Royton, Kendal, and Sunderland.
	Southampton Order 1868 Provisional Order for extending the Borrowing Powers of the Southampton Local Board of Health.	
	Bradford (Yorkshire) Order 1868 Provisional Order for extending the Borrowing Powers of the Bradford Local Board of Health.	
	Bradford (Yorkshire) Compulsory Purchase Order 1868 Provisional Order putting in force the Lands Clauses Consolidation Act, 1845, (Note: Lands Clauses Consolidation Act 1845 (8 & 9 Vict. c. 18)) within the District of Bradford in the County of York, for the Purchase of Lands by the Local Board of Health of the aforesaid District for Street Improvement Works under the Local Government Act, 1858.	
	Whitchurch and Dodington Order 1868 Provisional Order putting in force the Lands Clauses Consolidation Act, 1845, within the District of Whitchurch and Dodington in the County of Salop, for the Purchase of Lands by the Local Board of the aforesaid District for Street Improvement.	
	Royton (Lancashire) Order 1868 Provisional Order putting in force the Lands Clauses Consolidation Act, 1845, within the District of the Royton (Lancashire) Local Board, for the Purchase of Lands by the said Board for Purposes of Street and Road Improvement.	
	Kendal Order 1868 Provisional Order putting in force the Lands Clauses Consolidation Act, 1845, within the District of Kendal in the County of Westmoreland, for the Purchase of Lands by the Local Board of Health for the aforesaid District for Purposes of Drainage, &c.	
	Sunderland Order 1868 Provisional Order altering the Borough of Sunderland Act, 1851, (Note: Borough of Sunderland Act 1851 (14 & 15 Vict. c. lxvii)) and the Sunderland Corporation Act, 1865, (Note: Sunderland Corporation Act 1865 (28 & 29 Vict. c. lxx)) in force within the District of the Local Board of Health for the Borough of Sunderland in the County of Durham, for Extension of their Borrowing Powers.	
Local Government Supplemental Act 1868 (No. 4) or the Local Government Supplemental (No. 4) Act 1868'	31 & 32 Vict. c. lxxxv	13 July 1868
An Act to confirm a certain Provisional Order under The Local Government Act, 1858, relating to the District of Tormoham (Devonshire).
	Tormoham Order 1868 Provisional Order putting in force the Lands Clauses Consolidation Act, 1845, within the District of Tormoham, for the Purchase of Lands by the Local Board of Health of the aforesaid District for Street Improvements.	
Local Government Supplemental Act 1868 (No. 5) or the Local Government Supplemental (No. 5) Act 1868	31 & 32 Vict. c. lxxxvi	13 July 1868
An Act to confirm certain Provisional Orders under The Local Government Act, 1858, relating to the Districts of Malvern, Cowpen, Bristol, Sheffield, Margate, Bognor, and Otley; and for other Purposes relative to certain Districts under the said Act.
	Malvern Order 1868 Provisional Order in pursuance of Section 77 of the Local Government Act, 1858, for repealing Parts of and amending the Malvern Improvement Act, 1851, (Note: Malvern Improvement Act 1851 (14 & 15 Vict. c. xcvi)) and for other Purposes.	
	Cowpen Order 1868 Provisional Order for altering the Boundaries of the District of Cowpen, in the County of Northumberland, under the Provisions of the Local Government Act, 1858.	
	Bristol Order 1868 Provisional Order putting in force the Lands Clauses Consolidation Act, 1845, within the District of the Bristol Local Board of Health, for the Purchase of Lands by the said Board for Street Improvements.	
	Sheffield Order 1868 Provisional Order putting in force the Lands Clauses Consolidation Act, 1845, within the Sheffield Local Board District, for the Purchase and taking of Lands by the said Board otherwise than by Agreement for Purposes of Street Improvements.	
	Margate Order 1868 Provisional Order putting in force the Lands Clauses Consolidation Act, 1845, within the Borough of Margate, for the Purchase of Lands by the Local Board of the aforesaid Borough for Street Improvements.	
	Bognor Order 1868 Provisional Order for extending the Borrowing Powers of the Bognor Local Board.	
	Otley Order 1868 Provisional Order putting in force the Lands Clauses Consolidation Act, 1845, within the Otley Local Board District (Yorkshire), for the Purchase and taking of Lands by the said Board otherwise than by Agreement.	
Morley Gas Act 1868 (repealed)	31 & 32 Vict. c. lxxxvii	13 July 1868
An Act for authorizing the Morley Gas Company to raise further Monies; and for other Purposes. (Repealed by West Yorkshire Act 1980 (c.xiv))
Waterford and Limerick Railway Act 1868	31 & 32 Vict. c. lxxxviii	13 July 1868
An Act to enable the Waterford and Limerick Railway Company to raise additional Capital; and for other Purposes.
Glasgow Court Houses Amendment Act 1868	31 & 32 Vict. c. lxxxix	13 July 1868
An Act for enlarging and improving the Court-houses and Public Buildings of the City of Glasgow and County of Lanark, and erecting additional Court-houses, Halls, and Buildings; and for other Purposes.
Itchen Floating Bridge Act 1868 (repealed)	31 & 32 Vict. c. xc	13 July 1868
An Act to amend The Itchen Floating Bridge Act, 1863; (Note: Itchen Floating Bridge Act 1863 (26 & 27 Vict. c. cii)) and for other Purposes. (Repealed by Southampton Corporation Act 1973 (c. xix))
Stourbridge Railway Amendment Act 1868	31 & 32 Vict. c. xci	13 July 1868
An Act to extend the Powers of the Stourbridge Railway Company with respect to the Branch Railway to Stourbridge.
Worthing Gas Act 1868	31 & 32 Vict. c. xcii	13 July 1868
An Act for incorporating and granting other Powers to the Worthing Gaslight and Coke Company.
Clonmel, Lismore and Dungarvan Railway Act 1868	31 & 32 Vict. c. xciii	13 July 1868
An Act to extend the Time for the Purchase of Lands and for the Construction of the Works authorized by The Clonmel, Lismore, and Dungarvan Railway Act, 1865. (Note: Clonmel, Lismore and Dungarvan Railway Act 1865 (28 & 29 Vict. c. cclxiv))
Dundee Gas Act 1868 (repealed)	31 & 32 Vict. c. xciv	13 July 1868
An Act to authorize and incorporate Commissioners to supply with Gas the Town of Dundee and Districts and Places adjacent, and to transfer to them the Gasworks of the Dundee Gaslight Company and the Dundee New Gaslight Company; and for other Purposes. (Repealed by Dundee Corporation (Consolidated Powers) Order Confirmation Act 1957 (6 & 7 Eliz. 2. c. iv))
Ruthin Water Act 1868	31 & 32 Vict. c. xcv	13 July 1868
An Act for supplying with Water Ruthin and Places adjacent in the County of Denbigh.
Waterford Harbour (Dry Dock) Act 1868	31 & 32 Vict. c. xcvi	13 July 1868
An Act to authorize "The Commissioners for improving the Port and Harbour of Waterford" to construct a Dry Dock and Road, and other Works connected therewith respectively; and for other Purposes.
Barry Railway Act 1868 (repealed)	31 & 32 Vict. c. xcvii	13 July 1868
An Act for the Extension of Time for the Purchase of Lands and Completion of Works authorized by The Barry Railway Act, 1865, (Note: Barry Railway Act 1865 (28 & 29 Vict. c. ccxxxiv)) and The Barry Railway (Alteration) Act, 1866; (Note: Barry Railway (Alteration) Act 1866 (29 & 30 Vict. c. xcii)) and for other Purposes. (Repealed by Statute Law (Repeals) Act 2013 (c. 2))
Glastonbury and Street Tramway Act 1868	31 & 32 Vict. c. xcviii	13 July 1868
An Act for making a Tramway from the Somerset and Dorset Railway at Glastonbury to Street in the County of Somerset; and for other Purposes.
Teign Valley Railway Act 1868	31 & 32 Vict. c. xcix	13 July 1868
An Act for authorizing the Teign Valley Railway Company to make and maintain a Deviation of their authorized Railway; and for other Purposes.
Great Marlow Railway Act 1868	31 & 32 Vict. c. c	13 July 1868
An Act for making a Railway from the Wycombe Branch of the Great Western Railway to Great Marlow in the County of Buckingham; and for other Purposes.
Tottenham and Hampstead Junction Railway Act 1868	31 & 32 Vict. c. ci	13 July 1868
An Act for authorizing the Tottenham and Hampstead Junction Railway Company to raise further Monies; and for other Purposes.
Abergavenny and Monmouth Railway Act 1868	31 & 32 Vict. c. cii	13 July 1868
An Act to extend the Time for the compulsory Purchase of Lands for and for the Completion of the Abergavenny and Monmouth Railway.
Windsor and Eton Waterworks Act 1868 (repealed)	31 & 32 Vict. c. ciii	13 July 1868
An Act for granting Powers to the Proprietors of the Windsor and Eton Waterworks. (Repealed by Windsor and Eton Waterworks Act 1883 (46 & 47 Vict. c. cxcii))
Barrow-in-Furness Corporation Act 1868	31 & 32 Vict. c. civ	13 July 1868
An Act for authorizing the Corporation of the Borough of Barrow-in-Furness to supply with Gas and Water the Borough and adjacent Districts; to purchase the Undertaking of the Furness Gas and Water Company; for defining and extending the Powers of the Corporation in relation to the Improvement of the Borough, and to Police, and other Matters of Local Government; and for other Purposes.
Caledonian Railway (Abandonment, Extension of Time, &c.) Act 1868	31 & 32 Vict. c. cv	13 July 1868
An Act for enabling the Caledonian Railway Company to abandon certain authorized Branches; for extending the Periods limited for the Acquisition of Lands and Construction of Works as respects their Muirkirk Branch; for raising additional Money; and for other Purposes.
Gaslight and Coke Company's Act 1868	31 & 32 Vict. c. cvi	13 July 1868
An Act for consolidating the Acts relating to the Gaslight and Coke Company, for regulating their Capital, and for authorizing them to erect new Gasworks, and to construct other Works in connexion therewith, and to raise further Monies; and for other Purposes.
Kington and Eardisley Railway Act 1868	31 & 32 Vict. c. cvii	13 July 1868
An Act to enable the Kington and Eardisley Railway Company to make Deviations of their authorized Railways; to abandon Portions of their Railways; to revive and extend the Powers of compulsory Purchase of Lands; and to use a Portion of the Leominster and Kington Railway; and for other Purposes.
Metropolitan District Railway Act 1868	31 & 32 Vict. c. cviii	13 July 1868
An Act to grant further Powers to the Metropolitan District Railway Company.
Metropolitan Railway Act 1868	31 & 32 Vict. c. cix	13 July 1868
An Act for enabling the Metropolitan Railway Company to make a Junction Line in the Parish of Saint Sepulchre in the City of London; for giving Effect to Arrangements with other Companies; for extending the Time limited for the Purchase of certain Lands; for amending the Acts relating to the Company; and for other Purposes.
New Kilmainham Township Act 1868	31 & 32 Vict. c. cx	13 July 1868
An Act for the Improvement of the Township and District of New Kilmainham in the Barony of Upper Cross and County of Dublin.
Thames Embankment (North and South) Act 1868	31 & 32 Vict. c. cxi	13 July 1868
An Act for altering the Streets in communication with the Embankment on the North Side of the Thames; for giving Effect to an Arrangement with the South-eastern Railway Company with respect to the Pier at Hungerford, and to an Arrangement with the Metropolitan District Railway Company; and for amending some of the Provisions of the Acts relating to the Embankment on the South Side of the Thames; and for other Purposes.
Dundee Sea Wall, Esplanade and Street Act 1868	31 & 32 Vict. c. cxii	13 July 1868
An Act to authorize the Provost, Magistrates, and Tow a Council of the Royal Burgh of Dundee to construct a Sea Wall so as to enclose a Portion of the Alveus of the Frith of Tay opposite to the Burgh, and to form an Esplanade and a Road or Street on and within such Sea Wall; and for other Purposes.
Gun Barrel Proof Act 1868	31 & 32 Vict. c. cxiii	13 July 1868
An Act for repealing the Gun Barrel Proof Act, 1855, (Note: Gun Barrel Proof Act 1855 (18 & 19 Vict. c. cxlviii)) and for making other Provisions in lieu thereof; and for altering the Constitution of the Guardians of the Birmingham Proof House; and for better ensuring the due Proof of Gun Barrels; and for other Purposes.
Lancashire and Yorkshire and Lancashire Union Railways Act 1868	31 & 32 Vict. c. cxiv	13 July 1868
An Act to confer further Powers on the Lancashire and Yorkshire Railway Company, and on the Lancashire Union Railways Company, with respect to certain Railways in Lancashire authorized to be constructed by them severally or jointly.
Lancashire Union Railways Act 1868	31 & 32 Vict. c. cxv	13 July 1868
An Act for authorizing the Abandonment of a Portion of the Undertaking of the Lancashire Union Railways Company, and for extending the Time for the Completion of other Portions thereof; and for other Purposes.
Wolverhampton and Walsall Railway Act 1868	31 & 32 Vict. c. cxvi	13 July 1868
An Act to confer further Powers on the Wolverhampton and Walsall Railway Company.
Belfast Borough Act 1868	31 & 32 Vict. c. cxvii	13 July 1868
An Act to separate for certain Purposes Portions of the Borough of Belfast from the County of Down, and for other Purposes relating to the Improvement and Regulation of the Borough.
London and North Western Railway (Additional Powers) Act 1868	31 & 32 Vict. c. cxviii	13 July 1868
An Act for conferring additional Powers on the London and North-western Railway Company for the Construction of new Works, and in relation to their own Undertaking and the Undertakings of other Companies; and for other Purposes.
Dartford Water Act 1868	31 & 32 Vict. c. cxix	13 July 1868
An Act for transferring the Waterworks of the Dartford Local Board of Health to the Company of Proprietors of the Kent Waterworks Company; and for other Purposes.
London, Blackwall and Millwall Extension Railway Act 1868	31 & 32 Vict. c. cxx	13 July 1868
An Act for extending the Time limited for the compulsory Purchase of Lands authorized to be taken by The London, Blackwall, and Millwall Extension Railway Act, 1865, (Note: London, Blackwall and Millwall Extension Railway Act 1865 (28 & 29 Vict. c. cxvi)) and also the Time limited for completing the Railways and Works under such Act; for authorizing Arrangements with other Companies; and for other Purposes in relation to the London and Blackwall Railway Company.
Saint Ives and West Cornwall Junction Railway Amendment Act 1868 (repealed)	31 & 32 Vict. c. cxxi	13 July 1868
An Act for granting further Powers to the Saint Ives and West Cornwall Junction Railway Company. (Repealed by Statute Law (Repeals) Act 2013 (c. 2))
Holywell Railway (Deviation) Act 1868	31 & 32 Vict. c. cxxii	13 July 1868
An Act to authorize the Holywell Railway Company to divert and relinquish their authorized Railway, and to construct other Railways in substitution thereof; and for other Purposes.
London, Lewes and Brighton Railways Abandonment Act 1868 (repealed)	31 & 32 Vict. c. cxxiii	13 July 1868
An Act for the Abandonment of the Railways authorized by The South-eastern and London, Chatham, and Dover (London, Lewes, and Brighton) Railways Act, 1866. (Note: South Eastern and London, Chatham and Dover (London, Lewes and Brighton) Railways Act 1866 (29 & 30 Vict. c. cccxviii)) (Repealed by Statute Law (Repeals) Act 2013 (c. 2))
Clyde Navigation (Amendment) Act 1868	31 & 32 Vict. c. cxxiv	13 July 1868
An Act to authorize the Trustees of the Clyde Navigation to construct a Graving Dock, Quays or Wharfs, and other Works at the Harbour of Glasgow, and to borrow additional Money; and for other Purposes.
City of London Gas Act 1868	31 & 32 Vict. c. cxxv	13 July 1868
An Act to amend The Metropolis Gas Act, 1860, (Note: Metropolis Gas Act 1860 (23 & 24 Vict. c. 125)) and to make further Provision for regulating the Supply of Gas to the City of London; and for other Purposes connected therewith.
Eastbourne Gas Act 1868	31 & 32 Vict. c. cxxvi	13 July 1868
An Act for incorporating the Eastbourne Gas Company, and for conferring upon them further Powers for the Supply of Gas to the Town and Parish of Eastbourne and the Parish of Willingdon in the County of Sussex; and for other Purposes.
Halifax Corporation Waterworks and Improvement Act 1868	31 & 32 Vict. c. cxxvii	13 July 1868
An Act to enable the Mayor, Aldermen, and Burgesses of the Borough of Halifax to construct new Works in extension of their Waterworks; to extend their Limits of Supply; to acquire the Manufacturers' Hall; to improve the Borough of Halifax; and for other Purposes.
Portsmouth Camber Quays Act 1868	31 & 32 Vict. c. cxxviii	13 July 1868
An Act for enabling the Corporation of the Borough of Portsmouth to construct a new Wharf or Quay in the Camber; for extending their Powers to levy Rates and Dues; and for other Purposes.
St. Mary Church Local Board Act 1868	31 & 32 Vict. c. cxxix	13 July 1868
An Act for authorizing the Local Board for the District of Saint Mary Church in the County of Devon to supply their District with Gas, to erect a Town Hall and other Buildings, and to raise Monies; and for other Purposes.
Salford Hundred Court of Record Act 1868 (repealed)	31 & 32 Vict. c. cxxx	13 July 1868
An Act to amalgamate the Court of Record for the Hundred of Salford in the County of Lancaster and the Court of Record for the Trial of Civil Actions within the City of Manchester, and to constitute the said amalgamated Court the Court of Record for the Hundred of Salford in the County of Lancaster, with extended Powers, and to regulate the Practice and Procedure therein; and for other Purposes. (Repealed by Courts Act 1971 (c. 23))
Staffordshire Potteries Waterworks Act 1868	31 & 32 Vict. c. cxxxi	13 July 1868
An Act to extend the Limits within which the Staffordshire Potteries Waterworks Company may supply Water, and to empower them to construct additional Works, and to raise additional Capital; and for other Purposes.
Llanelly Harbour Improvement Act 1868	31 & 32 Vict. c. cxxxii	13 July 1868
An Act for extending the Time allowed for the Completion by the Llanelly Harbour and Burry Navigation Commissioners of certain Works; and for other Purposes.
Llynvi Valley Gas Act 1868	31 & 32 Vict. c. cxxxiii	13 July 1868
An Act for incorporating a Company for supplying with Gas the Parish of Llangonayd and other Places in the County of Glamorgan.
London, Brighton and South Coast Railway Act 1868	31 & 32 Vict. c. cxxxiv	13 July 1868
An Act to authorize the London, Brighton, and South Coast Railway Company to abandon certain Works; and for other Purposes.
Thames Embankment (Chelsea) Act 1868	31 & 32 Vict. c. cxxxv	13 July 1868
An Act to enable the Metropolitan Board of Works to embank the River Thames between the Royal Hospital at Chelsea and Battersea Bridge in the County of Middlesex, and to make a Roadway and other Works connected therewith; and for other Purposes.
Greenock and Ayrshire Railway (Amendment) Act 1868	31 & 32 Vict. c. cxxxvi	13 July 1868
An Act to authorize the Greenock and Ayrshire Railway Company to make and maintain certain Railways and Works; and for other Purposes.
Pontypool, Caerleon and Newport Railway Amendment Act 1868	31 & 32 Vict. c. cxxxvii	13 July 1868
An Act to extend the Powers of the Pontypool, Caerleon, and Newport Railway Company.
Aberdeen Harbour Act 1868	31 & 32 Vict. c. cxxxviii	13 July 1868
An Act for improving and maintaining the Harbour of Aberdeen.
North British Railway (General Powers) Act 1868	31 & 32 Vict. c. cxxxix	13 July 1868
An Act to authorize the North British Railway Company to execute various Railways and Works, and to abandon certain Railways and Works; and to extend the Time for the compulsory Purchase of Lands and Completion of Works with reference to several Railways and Works; and to amend in various Particulars the Acts relating to the Company passed in the last Session of Parliament; and for other Purposes.
Bradford Waterworks and Improvement Act 1868	31 & 32 Vict. c. cxl	13 July 1868
An Act for authorizing the Mayor, Aldermen, and Burgesses of the Borough of Bradford to make and maintain additional Waterworks, and for making additional Provision for Improvement of the Borough; and for other Purposes.
Waterford and Central Ireland Railway Act 1868	31 & 32 Vict. c. cxli	13 July 1868
An Act to change the Name of the Waterford and Kilkenny Railway Company; to confer upon them further Powers; and for other Purposes.
Brecon and Merthyr Railway Arrangement Act 1868	31 & 32 Vict. c. cxlii	13 July 1868
An Act for suspending legal Proceedings with reference to the Brecon and Merthyr Tydfil Junction Railway Company; for converting the Mortgage and other Debts into Debenture Stock; for authorizing the Completion of certain Lines of Railway; for regulating the Capital and future Management of the Company; and for other Purposes.
Derby Waterworks Act 1868	31 & 32 Vict. c. cxliii	13 July 1868
An Act for conferring further Powers upon the Derby Waterworks Company.
Athenry and Ennis Junction Railway Act 1868	31 & 32 Vict. c. cxliv	13 July 1868
An Act to enable the Athenry and Ennis Junction Railway Company to make Arrangements with other Companies; and for other Purposes.
Great Western Railway Act 1868	31 & 32 Vict. c. cxlv	13 July 1868
An Act for conferring further Powers on the Great Western Railway Company for the Construction of Works and in relation to their own Undertaking and the Undertakings of other Companies; and for other Purposes.
St. Leonard and St. Mary Magdalen Church Districts Act 1868	31 & 32 Vict. c. cxlvi	13 July 1868
An Act for making the Acts of Parliament relating to the Ecclesiastical Commission applicable to the reputed Parishes of Saint Leonard and Saint Mary Magdalen in the Diocese of Chichester; and for other Purposes connected therewith.
Ardmore Harbour Act 1868	31 & 32 Vict. c. cxlvii	16 July 1868
An Act to extend the Time for the Purchase of Lands and Completion of Works of the Ardmore Harbour; and to confer further Powers on the Ardmore Harbour Company.
Norwich Union Life Insurance Society Act 1868	31 & 32 Vict. c. cxlviii	16 July 1868
An Act to make Alterations in the Deed of Settlement of the Norwich Union Life Insurance Society; and for other Purposes.
Metropolitan and St. John's Wood Railway Act 1868	31 & 32 Vict. c. cxlix	16 July 1868
An Act for granting further Powers to The Metropolitan and Saint John's Wood Railway Company.
Salisbury Poor Relief Act 1868 (repealed)	31 & 32 Vict. c. cl	31 July 1868
An Act to confirm a Provisional Order made by the Poor Law Board under The Poor Law Amendment Act, 1867, (Note: Poor Law Amendment Act 1867 (30 & 31 Vict. c. 106)) with reference to the City of Salisbury. (Repealed by Statute Law (Repeals) Act 2013 (c. 2))
Drainage and Improvement of Lands Supplemental (Ireland) Act 1868	31 & 32 Vict. c. cli	31 July 1868
An Act to confirm a Provisional Order under The Drainage and Improvement of Lands (Ireland) Act, 1863, (Note: Drainage and Improvement of Lands (Ireland) Act 1863 (26 & 27 Vict. c. 88)) and the Acts amending the same.
	In the matter of the Clodiagh River Drainage District in the County of Tipperary.	
Local Government Supplemental (No. 3) Act 1868	31 & 32 Vict. c. clii	31 July 1868
An Act to confirm a certain Provisional Order under The Local Government Act, 1858, relating to the District of Tunbridge Wells.
	Tunbridge Wells Order 1868	
Local Government Act 1868 (No. 6) or the Local Government (No. 6) Act 1868 or the Local Government Supplemental (No. 6) Act 1868	31 & 32 Vict. c. cliii	31 July 1868
An Act to confirm certain Provisional Orders under The Local Government Act, 1858, relating to the Districts of Harrogate, Layton with Warbrick, Bury, Lower Brixham, Hexham, Tipton, Gainsborough, Worthing, Aberystwith, Cockermouth, Burnham, Wednesbury, Burton-upon-Trent, Hornsey, and Keswick, and for other Purposes relative to certain Districts under the said Act.
	Harrogate Order 1868 Provisional Order for altering and extending the Provisions of The Harrogate Improvement Act, 1841, (Note: Harrogate Improvement Act 1841 (4 & 5 Vict. c. xvi)) in force within the District of Harrogate, in the County of York, under The Local Government Act, 1858, and authorizing the Erection of Reservoirs, Baths, and other Arrangements for the Supply of the Mineral Waters of Harrogate.	
	Layton-with-Warbrick Order 1868 Provisional Order for extending the Borrowing Powers of the Layton-with-Warbrick Local Board of Health.	
	Bury Order 1868 Provisional Order putting in force The Lands Clauses Consolidation Act, 1845, for Street Improvements.	
	Lower Brixham Order 1868 Provisional Order putting in force The Lands Clauses Consolidation Act, 1845, within the District of the Lower Brixham Local Board foe the Purchase of Lands by the said Board for Works of Water Supply.	
	Hexham Order 1868 Provisional Order for extending the Borrowing Powers of the Hexham Local Board of Health (Northumberland).	
	Tipton Order 1868 Provisional Order for altering the Order in Council applying The Public Health Act, 1848, (Note: Public Health Act 1848 (11 & 12 Vict. c. 63)) to the District of Tipton in the County of Stafford.	
	Gainsborough Order 1868 Provisional Order for altering the Boundaries of the Paving and Lighting Area within the District of Gainsborough in the County of Lincoln, under the Provisions of The Local Government Act, 1858, and for re-uniting the separated Parts of the District called the Town District and Township (beyond the Limits of the Town) District.	
	Worthing Order 1868 (1) Provisional Orders repealing and altering Parts of Local Acts in force within the District of the Worthing Local Board of Health, and for other Purposes herein-after set forth.	
	Worthing Order 1868 (2) Provisional Order extending the Borrowing Powers of the said Worthing Local Board of Health.	
	Aberystwith Order 1868 Provisional Order for the Alteration and partial Repeal of The Aberystwith Improvement Act, 1835, (Note: Aberystwyth Improvement Act 1835 (5 & 6 Will. 4. c. xlvi)) in force within the District of the Aberystwith Local Board.	
	Cockermouth Order 1868 Provisional Order for extending the Borrowing Powers of the Cockermouth Local Board.	
	Burnham Order 1868 Provisional Order putting in force The Lands Clauses Consolidation Act, 1845, within the District of Burnham, in the County of Somerset, for the Purchase of Lands by the Local Board of Health of the aforesaid District for Street Improvements, &c.	
	Wednesbury Order 1868 Provisional Order for altering the Provisional Order applying The Public Health Act, 1848, to the District of Wednesbury, in the County of Stafford.	
	Burton-upon-Trent Order 1868 Provisional Order for altering Provisions of Burton-upon-Trent Local Act, (Note: Town of Burton-upon-Trent Act 1853 (16 & 17 Vict. c. cxviii)) and for other Purposes.	
	Hornsey Order 1868 Provisional Order for the Repeal of The Local Act (15 Geo. 3. Cap. 43.) (Note: Highgate (Streets) Act 1775 (15 Geo. 3. c. 43)) in force within the District of the Hornsey Local Board.	
	Keswick Order 1868 Provisional Order putting in force The Lands Clauses Consolidation Act, 1845, within the District of Keswick, for the Purchase of Lands by the Local Board of Health of the aforesaid District for Street Improvements.	
Lee Conservancy Act 1868	31 & 32 Vict. c. cliv	31 July 1868
An Act to make better Provision for the Preservation and Improvement of the River Lee and its Tributaries; and for other Purposes.
Tain Provisional Order Confirmation Act 1868	31 & 32 Vict. c. clv	31 July 1868
An Act to confirm a Provisional Order under The Public Health (Scotland) Act, 1867, (Note: Public Health (Scotland) Act 1867 (30 & 31 Vict. c. 101)) relating to the Burgh of Tain.
	Tain Water Order 1868	
Land Drainage Supplemental Act 1868 (No. 2) (repealed)	31 & 32 Vict. c. clvi	31 July 1868
An Act to confirm a Provisional Order under The Land Drainage Act, 1861. (Repealed by Statute Law (Repeals) Act 1993 (c. 50))
	In the Matter of Haddiscoe Improvement, situate in the several Parishes of Haddiscoe, Thorpe next Haddiscoe, and Aldeby in the County of Norfolk.	
Drainage and Improvement of Lands Supplemental (Ireland) (No. 2) Act 1868	31 & 32 Vict. c. clvii	31 July 1868
An Act to confirm a Provisional Order under The Drainage and Improvement of Lands (Ireland) Act, 1863, and the Acts amending the same.
	In the Matter of the Camoge Drainage District in the County Limerick.	
Drainage and Improvement of Lands Supplemental (Ireland) (No. 3) Act 1868	31 & 32 Vict. c. clviii	31 July 1868
An Act to confirm a Provisional Order under The Drainage and Improvement of Lands (Ireland) Act, and the Acts amending the same.
	In the Matter of the Upper Inny Drainage District, in the Counties of Westmeath, Meath, Cavan, and Longford.	
Fareham and Netley Railway Act 1868 (repealed)	31 & 32 Vict. c. clix	31 July 1868
An Act for the Extension of Time and Revival of Powers for the compulsory Purchase of Lands and Completion of Works authorized by The Fareham and Netley Railway Act, 1865; (Note: Fareham and Netley Railway Act 1865 (28 & 29 Vict. c. cliii)) and for other Purposes. (Repealed by Statute Law (Repeals) Act 2013 (c. 2))
St. Pancras Ecclesiastical Regulation Act 1868	31 & 32 Vict. c. clx	31 July 1868
An Act for the better Ecclesiastical Regulation of the Parish of Saint Pancras in the Diocese of London and the County of Middlesex.
Mersey Railway Act 1868	31 & 32 Vict. c. clxi	31 July 1868
An Act to extend the Time for the Purchase of Lands and Completion of the Mersey Railway; and for other Purposes.
Chichester and Midhurst Railway Extension Abandonment Act 1868	31 & 32 Vict. c. clxii	31 July 1868
An Act for the Abandonment of the Railway authorized by The Chichester and Midhurst Railway (Extension) Act, 1865. (Note: Chichester and Midhurst Railway (Extension) Act 1865 (28 & 29 Vict. c. cccliv))
East London Railway (Various Powers) Act 1868	31 & 32 Vict. c. clxiii	31 July 1868
An Act to confer further Powers on the East London Railway Company for the Execution of Works, and otherwise with reference to their Undertaking; and for other Purposes.
Great Eastern Railway Act 1868	31 & 32 Vict. c. clxiv	31 July 1868
An Act to extend the Time for the compulsory Purchase of Lands and Completion of Works authorized by several Acts relating to the Great Eastern Railway; and to alter certain Powers of appointing Directors of the Great Eastern Railway Company; and for other Purposes.
Star Life Assurance Society Act 1868 (repealed)	31 & 32 Vict. c. clxv	31 July 1868
An Act for enabling the Star Life Assurance Society to sue and be sued in their own Name; and for other Purposes. (Repealed by Star Assurance Society's Act 1911 (1 & 2 Geo. 5. c. lxix))
Belfast Central Railway Act 1868	31 & 32 Vict. c. clxvi	31 July 1868
An Act to empower the Belfast Central Railway Company to construct new Railways and Tramways and a Central Station, and to abandon Portions of their authorized Undertaking; and for other Purposes.
Liverpool Tramways Act 1868 (repealed)	31 & 32 Vict. c. clxvii	31 July 1868
An Act for making Street Tramways in Liverpool; and for other Purposes. (Repealed by Liverpool Corporation Act 1921 (11 & 12 Geo. 5. c. lxxiv))
Lambeth Market Act 1868 (repealed)	31 & 32 Vict. c. clxviii	31 July 1868
An Act for making and maintaining a Market in the Borough of Lambeth in the County of Surrey. (Repealed by Statute Law (Repeals) Act 2013 (c. 2))
Waterloo and Whitehall Railway Act 1868 (repealed)	31 & 32 Vict. c. clxix	31 July 1868
An Act to extend the Powers of the Waterloo and Whitehall Railway Company with respect to a Portion of their authorized Undertaking. (Repealed by Statute Law (Repeals) Act 2013 (c. 2))
Bishop's Stortford Railway Act 1868 or the Bishop's Stortford, Dunmow and Braintree Railway Act 1868	31 & 32 Vict. c. clxx	31 July 1868
An Act to provide for the Settlement of the Claims of the Contractors and others with respect to the Construction of the Bishop Stortford Railway, and for vesting the Possession of that Railway in the Great Eastern Railway Company.
Weedon and Daventry Railway Act 1868	31 & 32 Vict. c. clxxi	31 July 1868
An Act to incorporate a Company for making The Weedon and Daventry Railway; and for other Purposes.
South Eastern Railway Act 1868	31 & 32 Vict. c. clxxii	31 July 1868
An Act for granting certain Powers to the South-eastern Railway Company.
Wey and Arun Junction Canal (Abandonment) Act 1868	31 & 32 Vict. c. clxxiii	31 July 1868
An Act to provide for the closing of the Wey and Arun Junction Canal, and the Sale of the Site thereof; and for other Purposes.
Devon and Cornwall Railway Act 1868	31 & 32 Vict. c. clxxiv	31 July 1868
An Act for authorizing the Devon and Cornwall Railway Company to alter the Line and Levels of Parts of their Railways ; and for other Purposes.
Towns Drainage and Sewage Utilization Company's Amendment Act 1868	31 & 32 Vict. c. clxxv	31 July 1868
An Act to alter and amend the Act (Note: Towns Drainage and Sewage Utilization Act 1867 (30 & 31 Vict. c. clxxiii)) relating to the Towns Drainage and Sewage Utilization Company; and for other Purposes.
Cork and Kinsale Junction Railway Act 1868	31 & 32 Vict. c. clxxvi	31 July 1868
An Act to make more effectual Provision for the working of the Cork and Kinsale Junction Railway; and for other Purposes.
Cambrian Railways Act 1868	31 & 32 Vict. c. clxxvii	31 July 1868
An Act for fusing all the Revenues of the Cambrian Railways Company, and settling the Application thereof; and to confer Rights of Voting on the Preference Shareholders of that Company; and for other Purposes.
Bristol and North Somerset Railway Act 1868	31 & 32 Vict. c. clxxviii	31 July 1868
An Act to authorize the Bristol and North Somerset Railway Company to deviate from the authorized Line of their Railway at Bristol; and for other Purposes.
Belgravia and South Kensington New Road (Amendment) Act 1868	31 & 32 Vict. c. clxxix	31 July 1868
An Act to extend and amend the Borrowing Powers of the Belgravia Road Company; and for other Purposes.
Cork and Macroom (Direct) Railway Act 1868	31 & 32 Vict. c. clxxx	31 July 1868
An Act to grant further Powers to the Cork and Macroom (Direct) Railway Company.
Isle of Wight (Newport Junction) Railway Act 1868	31 & 32 Vict. c. clxxxi	31 July 1868
An Act for making Railways in the Isle of Wight to connect Newport and Cowes with Sandown, Ryde, and Ventnor.
Rathkeale and Newcastle Junction Railway Act 1868	31 & 32 Vict. c. clxxxii	31 July 1868
An Act to confer Facilities on the Rathkeale and Newcastle Junction Railway Company for raising Funds under their Borrowing Powers.

=== Private acts ===
Short title	Citation	Royal assent
Long title
Alexander Scott's Hospital Act 1868	31 & 32 Vict. c. 1 Pr.	29 May 1868
An Act to incorporate the Trustees and Managers of Alexander Scott's Hospital at Huntly in the County of Aberdeen, and to extend the Benefits thereof.
Dunn Gardner's Estate Act 1868	31 & 32 Vict. c. 2 Pr.	13 July 1868
An Act to enable William Dunn Gardner Esquire, upon purchasing the respective Reversions of and in certain Leasehold Estates devised by the Will of William Dunn Gardner, deceased, to charge the said Estates with the Purchase Money and the Expenses incident to such Purchase, and to convey or cause to be conveyed the same Estates by way of Mortgage to secure the Payment of the said Purchase Money and Expenses, without incurring a Forfeiture of his Estate and Interest under the same Will; and for other Purposes.
Domvile Estate Act 1868	31 & 32 Vict. c. 3 Pr.	31 July 1868
An Act to enable Sir Charles Compton William Domvile Baronet to borrow upon the Security of his Entitled Estates, situate in the County of Dublin, a Sum of Money for the Repayment to him of a Portion of the Monies laid out by him in the Improvement of the said Estates.
Duke of Richmond's Estate Act 1868	31 & 32 Vict. c. 4 Pr.	31 July 1868
An Act for authorizing the Trustees under an Act passed in the Thirty-ninth and Fortieth Years of His Majesty King George the Third (Note: Duke of Richmond's Annuity Act 1800 (39 & 40 Geo. 3. c. 43)) for enabling the Duke of Richmond for the Time being to grant Jointures as therein mentioned, and for other Purposes, to sell certain Parts of the Duke of Richmond's Settled Estates, and to invest the Money to arise from such Sales in the Purchase of other Estates to be settled to the same Uses, and also to raise a Sum of Thirty thousand Pounds by Mortgage of the Settled Estates to be invested in the same Manner, and for other Purposes.
Hamp's Estate Act 1868	31 & 32 Vict. c. 5 Pr.	31 July 1868
An Act to carry into effect an Arrangement approved in the Suits of "Hamp v. Hamp," "Hamp v. Robinson," and "Hamp v. Bolt," now depending in the High Court of Chancery, for the Purpose of compromising certain opposing Claims to the Real Estates of Francis Hamp late of Bacton Villa in the Parish of Bacton in the County of Hereford, Esquire; and for other Purposes.
Savile Estate (Extension of Powers) Act 1868	31 & 32 Vict. c. 6 Pr.	31 July 1868
An Act to extend the Powers contained in the Will of the Right Honourable John Savile Lumley Savile Earl of Scarbrough deceased, and in The Savile Estate (Leasing) Act, 1861, (Note: Savile Estate (Leasing) Act 1861 (24 & 25 Vict. c. 2 Pr.)) with respect to certain Estates in the County of York, Part of the Savile Estates devised by or subject to the Trusts of the said Will, and for other Purposes, and of which the Short Title is Savile Estate (Extension of Powers) Act, 1868.
Ward Jackson's Estate Act 1868	31 & 32 Vict. c. 7 Pr.	31 July 1868
An Act to extend and amend Ward Jackson's Estate Act, 1853; (Note: Ward Jackson's Estate Act 1853 (16 & 17 Vict. c. 18 Pr.)) and for other Purposes.
Aberdeen Town Council Act 1868	31 & 32 Vict. c. 8 Pr.	31 July 1868
An Act to provide for the vesting and Management of certain Funds held in trust by the Town Council of Aberdeen; and for other Purposes.
Gardiner's Patent Act 1868 (Note: This act was not printed by the Queen's Printer.)	31 & 32 Vict. c. 9 Pr.	29 May 1868
An Act for rendering valid certain Letters Patent granted to Perry Green Gardiner of the City of New York in the United States of America.
Bolckow's Naturalization Act 1868	31 & 32 Vict. c. 10 Pr.	29 May 1868
An Act to confer upon Henry William Ferdinand Bolckow all the Rights, Privileges, and Capacities of a natural-born Subject of Her Majesty the Queen.
Allhusen's Naturalization Act 1868	31 & 32 Vict. c. 11 Pr.	25 June 1868
An Act to confer upon Christian Allhusen all the Rights, Privileges, and Capacities of a natural-born Subject of Her Majesty the Queen.

=== Sources ===
- Rickards, George Kettilby, ed. (1868). The Statutes of the United Kingdom of Great Britain and Ireland, 31 & 32 Victoria, 1867-8. London: Eyre and Spottiswoode – via Internet Archive.
- A Collection of the Public General Statutes passed in the Thirty-first and Thirty-second Years of the Reign of Her Majesty Queen Victoria. London: Eyre and Spottiswoode. 1868 – via Internet Archive.

== See also ==
- List of acts of the Parliament of the United Kingdom
