= Central Pier, Morecambe =

Pier in Lancashire, England, 1869–1987

Central Pier
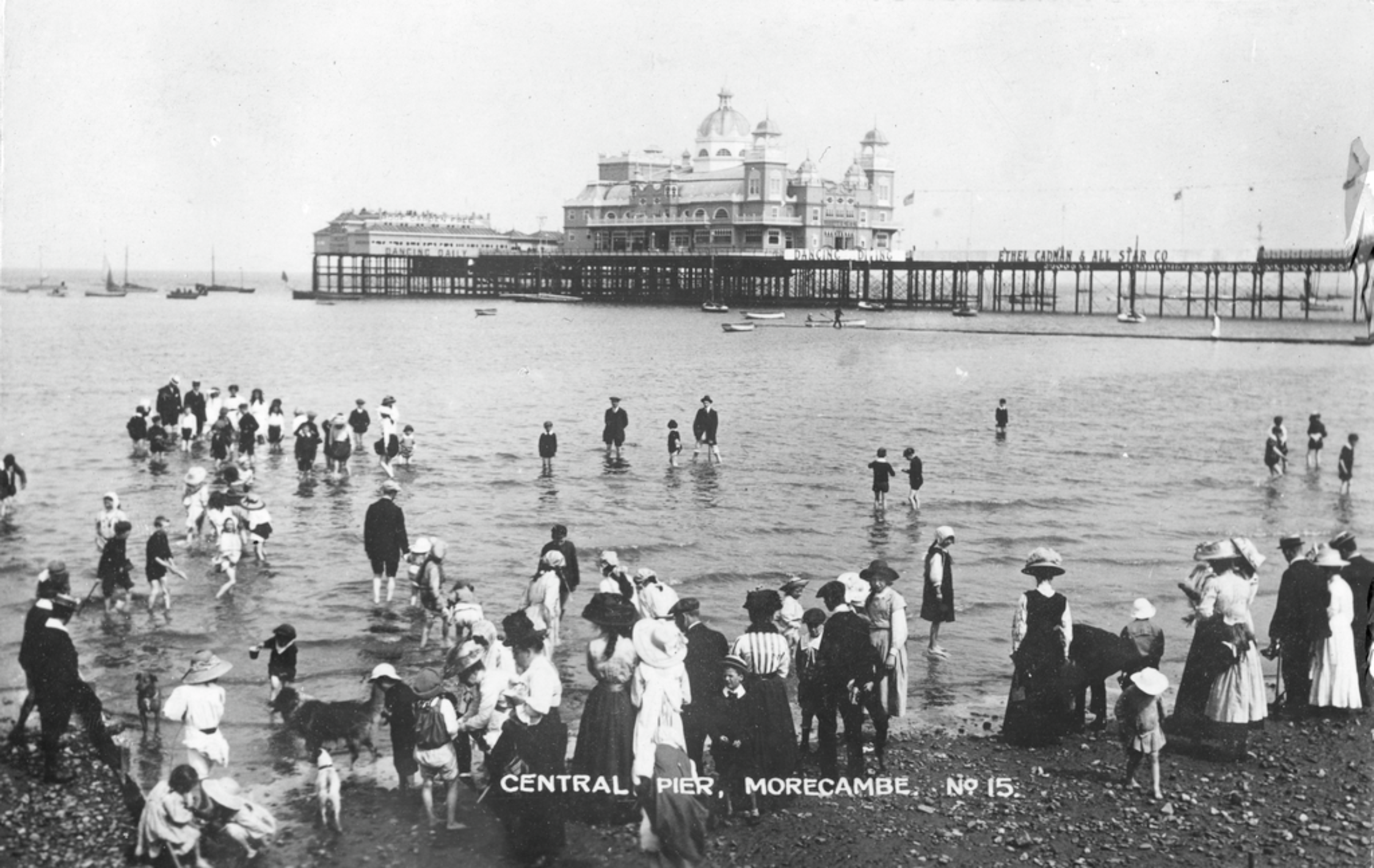
- The pier c. 1900
- Type: Pier
- Carries: Pedestrians
- Location: Morecambe
- Coordinates: 54.0750°N 2.8662°W

Characteristics
- Total length: 912 feet (278 m)

History
- Opening date: 1869; 157 years ago
- Closure date: 1987; 39 years ago
- Location in Morecambe

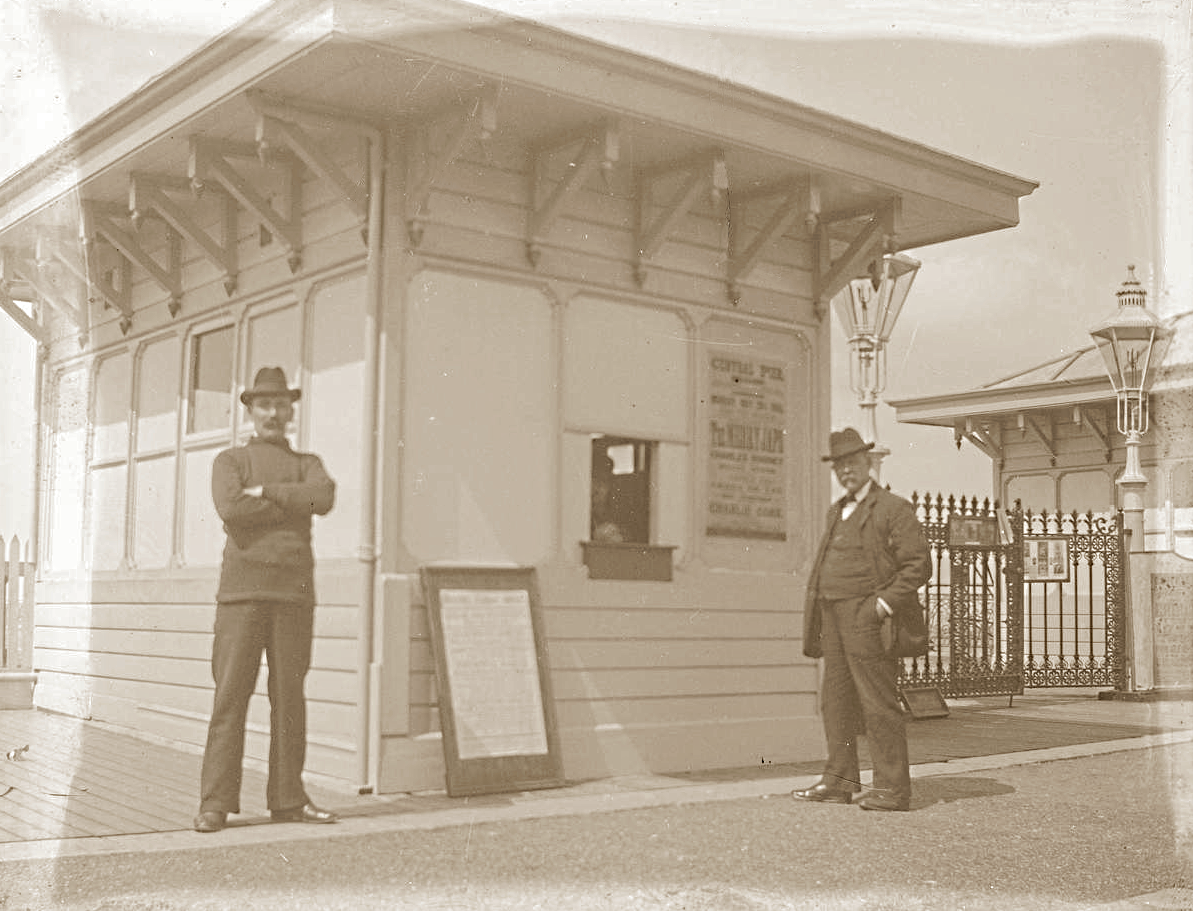
Pavilions at the entrance to the pier

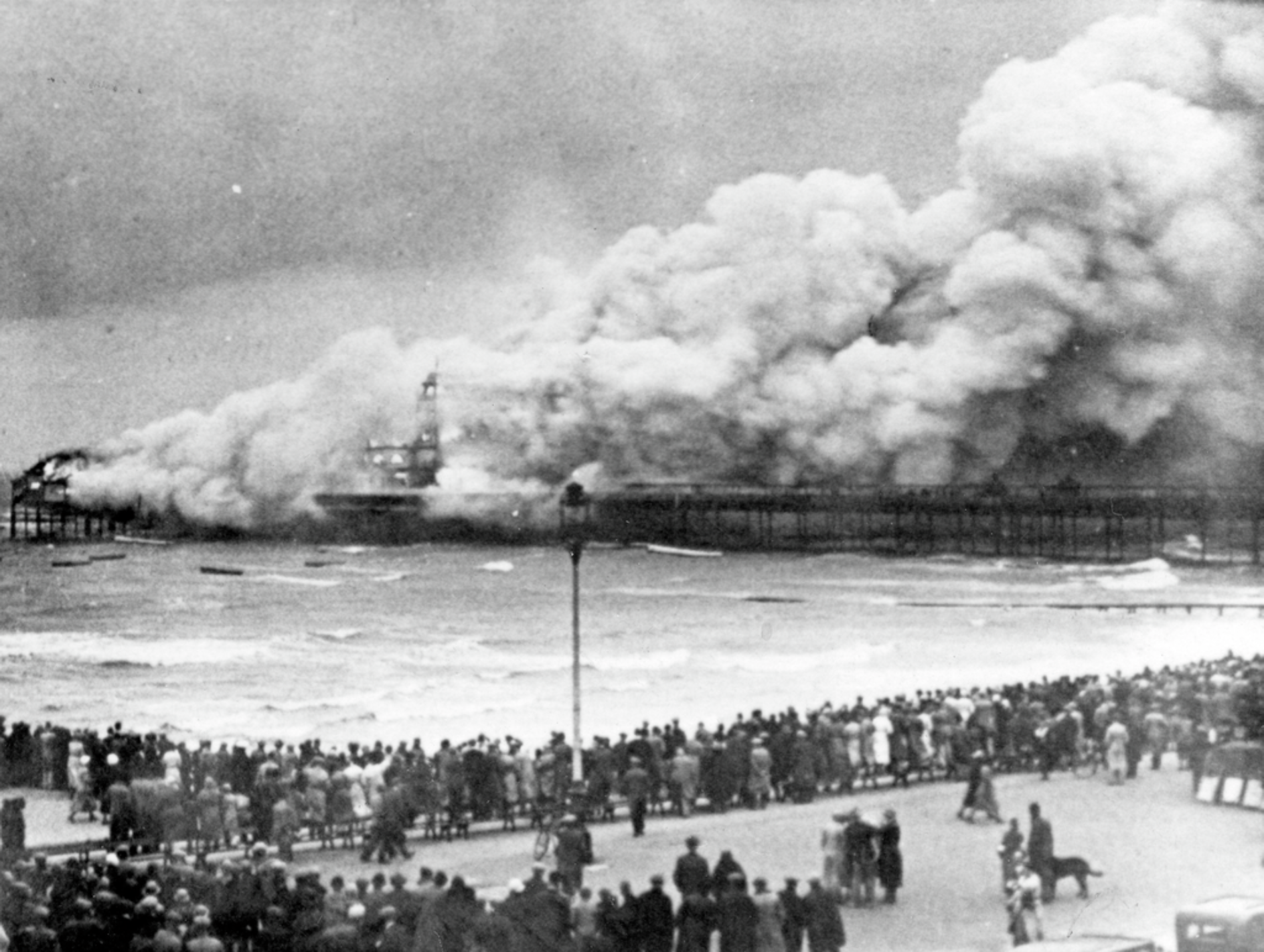
The fire in 1933 which destroyed the main pavilion

Central Pier is the last remaining of two piers in Morecambe, Lancashire, England. Built during the late 1860s, it was 912 feet (278 m) long and featured a large pier head served by steamboats. Two significant fires occurred during its lifetime, one in 1933 destroying the pavilion then dubbed the "Taj Mahal of the North", and another in 1991, the latter which condemned the pier as unsafe and demolition took place the following year in 1992. It was rebuilt as a small structure called Old Morecambe Central Pier.

== Layout ==
An arcade existed at the pier entrance with covered walkways either side that led onto a central covered walkway. At the pier head was a ballroom, small theatre and a skating rink, the latter two having been added following widening into a T-shape configuration. The promenade was 13.1 metres (43 ft) wide with 140mm timber boards laid in a longitude arrangement.

== History ==
The pier was proposed around 1867. Authorisation was obtained in Morecambe Pier Order 1868 and construction began the same year, opening on 25 March 1869 at a cost of £10,000 (equivalent to £1,029,140 in 2025). Built at a length of 912 feet (278 m), the pier was enlarged during the early 1870s at a cost of £5000 (equivalent to £488,842 in 2025) and strengthened in 1896. In September 1895, a considerable portion of the landing stage collapsed as a steamer was approaching, causing over 50 people to fall into water in front of hundreds of spectators. The disaster, thought to be caused by corroded bolts, claimed the lives of three victims. A pavilion was built sometime around 1897 although was destroyed in a fire in 1933, replaced by art deco style buildings of a simpler architecture. Steamers called at a pier until 1914.

Following the opening of new West End Pier, the older pier, then renamed to Central Pier, opened its own grander pavilion in July 1898, which with a capacity of 3,000 people, could hold 50% more than the newer West End Pier's five-domed pavilion. The longer traveling distance from Lancashire's cotton towns meant Morecambe was only able to attract around 10% of the numbers that Blackpool's piers attracted. Dubbed the "Taj Mahal of the North", the building was destroyed by a fire in the early evening of 31 July 1933. At the time, the pier was mostly deserted although within 30 minutes, the fire had spread to the pavilion while wind blew sparks onto nearby promenade buildings causing some to alight. Thousands of onlookers watched firefighters try and control the blaze, with priority given to preventing flames destroying the pier decking. The fire, which was the third pier fire in that week, destroyed 12 shops and band instruments which were inside the pavilion. A new 2000-seat ballroom was built during the mid-1930s at a cost of £25,000 (equivalent to £1,537,238 in 2025).

== Closure and demolition ==
During Easter of 1986, decking collapsed at the seaward end of the pier which forced its closure and a fire on 4 February the following year damaged the amusement arcade. Having been declared unsafe in 1987, another fire destroyed the pavilion and ballroom on 31 March 1991 and following a condemnation report by the council, demolition occurred in March the following year.
