= Children Act 1908 =

Act of the Parliament of the United Kingdom

Children Act 1908 (Note: Section 134(1).)
- Act of Parliament
- Parliament of the United Kingdom
- Long title: An Act to consolidate and amend the Law relating to the Protection of Children and Young Persons, Reformatory and Industrial Schools, and Juvenile Offenders, and otherwise to amend the Law with respect to Children and Young Persons.
- Citation: 8 Edw. 7. c. 67
- Territorial extent: United Kingdom

Dates
- Royal assent: 21 December 1908
- Commencement: 1 April 1909 (Note: Section1 34(2).)
- Repealed: Northern Ireland: England and Wales and Scotland: 1 April 1959
Other legislation
Amends	See § Repealed enactments
Repeals/revokes	See § Repealed enactments
Amended by	Children Act (1908) Amendment Act 1910; Education Act 1921; Poor Law Act 1927; Children and Young Persons Act 1932; Children and Young Persons (Scotland) Act 1932; Children and Young Persons Act 1933; Local Government Act 1933; Public Health Act 1936; Public Health (London) Act 1936; Statute Law Revision Act 1950
Repealed by	Northern Ireland: Children and Young Persons Act (Northern Ireland) 1950; England and Wales and Scotland: Children Act 1958
Relates to	Children (Employment Abroad) Act 1913; Children (Employment Abroad) Act 1930

Status: Repealed

Text of statute as originally enacted

The Children Act 1908 (8 Edw. 7. c. 67), also known as the Children and Young Persons Act 1908, was an act of the Parliament of the United Kingdom passed by the Liberal government, as part of the British Liberal Party's liberal reforms package. The act was informally known as the Children's Charter and largely superseded the Industrial Schools Act 1868 (31 & 32 Vict. c. 25).

The act established juvenile courts and introduced the registration for foster care, thus regulating baby farming and wet nursing and trying to stamp out infanticide. Local authorities were also granted powers to keep poor children out of the poorhouse/workhouse and protect them from abuse. The act also prohibited children, under the age of 16, from working in dangerous trades, purchasing cigarettes, entering brothels, or the bars of trading pubs. It also established a minimum execution age of sixteen. That age was raised to 18 in 1933, albeit no juvenile offenders had been executed since 1889.

Additionally, it prohibited the consumption of alcohol for non-medicinal purposes, before the age of five. The act also prohibited children from learning criminal "tricks of the trade" in adult prisons, where children were often sent to serve time if a crime had been committed. Instead the Children's Charter had allocated Borstals. It eventually led to many councils setting up social services and orphanages.

== Provisions ==
=== Repealed enactments ===
Section 134(3) of the act repealed 38 enactments, listed in the third schedule to the act.

Citation	Short title	Description	Extent of Repeal
17 & 18 Vict. c. clxix	Middlesex Industrial Schools Act 1854	The Middlesex Industrial Schools Act, 1854.	The whole act.
29 & 30 Vict. c. 117	Reformatory Schools Act 1866	The Reformatory Schools Act, 1866.	The whole act.
29 & 30 Vict. c. 118	Industrial Schools Act 1866	The Industrial Schools Act, 1866.	The whole act.
31 & 32 Vict. c. 25	Industrial Schools Act (Ireland) 1868	The Industrial Schools (Ireland) Act, 1868.	The whole act.
31 & 32 Vict. c. 59	Irish Reformatory Schools Act 1868	The Irish Reformatory Schools Act, 1868.	The whole Act, except section twenty-five.
33 & 34 Vict. c. 75	Elementary Education Act 1870	The Elementary Education Act, 1870.	Sections twenty-seven and twenty-eight. Section fifty-two, so far as it relates to industrial schools.
34 & 35 Vict. c. 112	Prevention of Crimes Act 1871	The Prevention of Crimes Act, 1871.	Section fourteen.
35 & 36 Vict. c. 21	Reformatory and Industrial Schools Acts Amendment Act 1872	The Reformatory and Industrial Schools Acts Amendment Act, 1872.	The whole act.
35 & 36 Vict. c. 62	Education (Scotland) Act 1872	The Education (Scotland) Act, 1872.	Section forty-one.
35 & 36 Vict. c. 93	Pawnbrokers Act 1872	The Pawnbrokers Act, 1872.	In section thirty-two the words "to be under the age of twelve years or."
36 & 37 Vict. c. 86	Elementary Education Act 1873	The Elementary Education Act, 1873.	Section fourteen.
37 & 38 Vict. c. 47	Prisons Authorities Act 1874	The Prisons Authorities Act, 1874.	The whole act.
38 & 39 Vict. c. lxxxvii	Middlesex Industrial Schools Act 1875	The Middlesex Industrial Schools Act, 1875.	The whole act.
39 & 40 Vict. c. 79	Elementary Education Act 1876	The Elementary Education Act, 1876.	Section twelve, from "A child shall be sent" to the end of the section. In section thirteen the words "or the Industrial Schools Act, 1866, to an industrial school," and the words "or the Industrial Schools Act, 1866." Section fourteen. Section fifteen. Section sixteen. Section seventeen.
40 & 41 Vict. c. 53	Prisons (Scotland) Act 1877	The Prisons (Scotland) Act, 1877.	Section sixty-seven.
41 & 42 Vict. c. 40	Prisons Authorities Act 1874 Amendment Act 1878	The Prisons Authorities Act (1874) Amendment Act, 1878.	The whole act.
42 & 43 Vict. c. 48	Elementary Education (Industrial Schools) Act 1879	The Elementary Education (Industrial Schools) Act, 1879.	The whole act.
42 & 43 Vict. c. 49	Summary Jurisdiction Act 1879	The Summary Jurisdiction Act, 1879.	Subsection (1) of section eleven from the words "and if the young person is a male" to the end of the sub-section. In section fifteen, the words "imprisoned for a longer period than one month nor."
43 & 44 Vict. c. 15	Industrial Schools Act Amendment Act 1880	The Industrial Schools Acts Amendment Act, 1880.	The whole act.
44 & 45 Vict. c. 29	Reformatory Institutions (Ireland) Act 1881	The Reformatory Institutions (Ireland) Act, 1881.	The whole act.
47 & 48 Vict. c. 19	Summary Jurisdiction over Children (Ireland) Act 1884	The Summary Jurisdiction over Children (Ireland) Act, 1884.	Subsection (1) of section five from the words "and if the young person is a male," to end of subsection. In section six the words "imprisoned for a longer period than one month nor."
47 & 48 Vict. c. 40	Reformatory and Industrial Schools (Manx Children) Act 1884	The Reformatory and Industrial Schools (Manx Children) Act, 1884.	The whole act.
48 & 49 Vict. c. 19	Industrial Schools (Ireland) Act 1885	The Industrial Schools (Ireland) Act, 1885.	The whole act.
48 & 49 Vict. c. 69	Criminal Law Amendment Act 1885	The Criminal Law Amendment Act, 1885.	Section four, from "and if, having regard" to "as if he or she had been sworn."
54 & 55 Vict. c. 23	Reformatory and Industrial Schools Act 1891	The Reformatory and Industrial Schools Act, 1891.	The whole act.
56 & 57 Vict. c. 12	Day Industrial Schools (Scotland) Act 1893	The Day Industrial Schools (Scotland) Act, 1893.	Section three. Section four, from "an order under this section" to the end of the section. Section five. Section six. Section seven. In section eight the words "or under the Industrial Schools Act, 1866." Section nine.
56 & 57 Vict. c. 48	Reformatory Schools Act 1893	The Reformatory Schools Act, 1893.	The whole act.
57 & 58 Vict. c. 33	Industrial Schools Acts Amendment Act 1894	The Industrial Schools Acts Amendment Act, 1894.	The whole act.
58 & 59 Vict. c. 17	Reformatory and Industrial Schools (Channel Islands Children) Act 1895	The Reformatory and Industrial Schools (Channel Islands Children) Act, 1895.	The whole act.
60 & 61 Vict. c. 57	Infant Life Protection Act 1897	The Infant Life Protection Act, 1897.	The whole act.
62 & 63 Vict. c. 12	Reformatory Schools Act 1899	The Reformatory Schools Act, 1899.	The whole act.
63 & 64 Vict. c. 53	Elementary Education Act 1900	The Elementary Education Act, 1900.	Section four.
1 Edw. 7 c. 20	Youthful Offenders Act 1901	The Youthful Offenders Act, 1901.	The whole act.
2 Edw. 7 c. 42	Education Act 1902	The Education Act, 1902.	Paragraph (8) of the Third Schedule to "Elementary Education Act, 1873, and," and in the same paragraph the words "for the second reference in that section the Education Department and also."
4 Edw. 7 c. 15	Prevention of Cruelty to Children Act 1904	The Prevention of Cruelty to Children Act, 1904.	Section one. In section two, paragraph (a). In section four, the words "or any of the offences mentioned in the First Schedule to this Act," and paragraph (b). Sections five to eleven. In section twelve, the words "or for any of the offences mentioned in the First Schedule to this Act." Section thirteen. Section fourteen. In section fifteen, the words "or for any of the offences mentioned in the First Schedule to this Act." Section sixteen. In section seventeen, the words "or any of the offences mentioned in the First Schedule to this Act." In section eighteen, the words "or any of the offences mentioned in the First Schedule to this Act," and the words "or of an offence mentioned in the First Schedule to this Act," and "or any offence mentioned in the First Schedule to this Act," and subsection (2) from "and may charge him with the offences" to the end of that subsection. Section nineteen, from "or when in the case" to "decision of the court," and the words "or order or decision." Section twenty. Section twenty-one. In section twenty-three, subsection (2). Section twenty-five. Section twenty-six. Section twenty-eight. In section twenty-nine, the definitions of "street," "place of safety," and "Industrial Schools Acts." In section thirty, the words "The Secretary for Scotland shall be substituted for a Secretary of State," and the words from "The expression 'court of summary jurisdiction'" to the end of the section. In section thirty-one, the words "The Chief Secretary shall be substituted for a Secretary of State." The Schedules.
4 Edw. 7 c. 27	Secretary for Scotland Act 1904	The Secretary for Scotland Act, 1904.	The whole act.
7 Edw. 7 c. 17	Probation of Offenders Act 1907	The Probation of Offenders Act, 1907.	In section one, subsection (3), from "and if the offender" to the end of the subsection. Subsection (4) of section six, from "In the case" to the end of the subsection.
8 Edw. 7 c. xxvii	Edinburgh Corporation (Tramways, &c.) Order Confirmation Act 1908	The Edinburgh Corporation (Tramways, &c.) Order Confirmation Act, 1908.	Subsections (1) and (3) of section fifteen of the Schedule.

== Subsequent developments ==
Part I of the act was repealed for England and Wales by section 346(1)(b) of, and the fifth part of the third schedule to, the Public Health Act 1936 (26 Geo. 5 & 1 Edw. 8. c. 49).

The whole act was repealed by section 1(1) of, and the first schedule to, the Statute Law Revision Act 1950 (14 Geo. 6. c. 6), which came into force on 23 May 1950.

The whole act was repealed for England and Wales and Scotland by section 40(2) of, and the second schedule to, the Children Act 1958 (6 & 7 Eliz. 2. c. 65), which came into force on 1 April 1959.

The whole act was repealed for Northern Ireland by section 141(2) of, and the seventh schedule to, the Children and Young Persons Act (Northern Ireland) 1950.

The Methodist Insurance Company introduced an insurance policy covering liability for church youth activities in 1911 as a consequence of the passing of the 1908 legislation.
