= Industrial Schools (Ireland) Act 1868 =

Act of the Parliament of the United Kingdom

Industrial Schools Act (Ireland) 1868 (Note: Section 1.)
- Act of Parliament
- Parliament of the United Kingdom
- Long title: An Act to extend the Industrial Schools Act to Ireland.
- Citation: 31 & 32 Vict. c. 25
- Territorial extent: Ireland (Note: Section 2.)

Dates
- Royal assent: 29 May 1868
- Commencement: 29 May 1868 (Note: The Acts of Parliament (Commencement) Act 1793.)
- Repealed: 1 April 1909
Other legislation
Repealed by	Children Act 1908

Status: Repealed

Text of statute as originally enacted

The Industrial Schools Act (Ireland) 1868 or the Industrial Schools (Ireland) Act 1868 (31 & 32 Vict. c. 25) was an act of Parliament which created industrial schools in Ireland to care for neglected, orphaned and abandoned children.

To prevent proselytism or changes in the religion of a child committed, Catholic and Protestant children were sent to separate schools.

== Subsequent developments ==
The whole act was repealed by section 134(3) of, and the third schedule to, the Children Act 1908 (8 Edw. 7. c. 67), which came into force on 1 April 1909.

== See also ==
- Industrial school (Ireland)
