= Universities Elections Act 1868 =

Act of the Parliament of the United Kingdom

Universities Elections Act 1868 (Note: Section 4.)
- Act of Parliament
- Parliament of the United Kingdom
- Long title: An Act to amend the Law relating to the Use of Voting Papers in Elections for the Universities.
- Citation: 31 & 32 Vict. c. 65
- Territorial extent: United Kingdom

Dates
- Royal assent: 31 July 1868
- Commencement: 31 July 1868 (Note: Section 1.)
- Repealed: 6 February 1918
Other legislation
Amends	Universities Elections Act 1861
Repealed by	Representation of the People Act 1918

Status: Repealed

Text of statute as originally enacted

The Universities Elections Act 1868 (31 & 32 Vict. c. 65) was an act of the Parliament of the United Kingdom to change the rules for voting papers used in the election of MPs for university constituencies. The act amended the previous University Elections Act 1861 (24 & 25 Vict. c. 53).

== Provisions ==
Section 1 of the act amended the declaration needing to be made on the ballot paper to read "I solemnly declare that verily believe that this is the Paper by which A.B. [the Voter] intends to vote pursuant to the Provisions of the Universities Election Acts, 1861 and 1868."

Section 2 of the act amends the language used in the processing and certification of voting papers with reference to the University of London.

=== Section 3 ===
Section 3 of the act outlines the officials able to certify the validity of the voting papers in the Channel Islands. These are as follows:

- In Jersey & Guernsey - Bailiffs, Lieutenant Bailiffs, Jurat, or Juge d'Instruction.
- In Alderney - A judge of Alderney or Jurat.
- In Sark - Seneschal or Deputy Seneschal.

== Subsequent developments ==
The whole act was repealed by section 47(1) of, and the eighth schedule to, the Representation of the People Act 1918.
