= Petroleum (Transfer of Licences) Act 1936 =

Act of the Parliament of the United Kingdom

Petroleum (Transfer of Licences) Act 1936 (Note: Section 2.)
- Act of Parliament
- Parliament of the United Kingdom
- Long title: An Act to make provision with respect to the transfer of petroleum-spirit licences granted under the Petroleum (Consolidation) Act, 1928.
- Citation: 26 Geo. 5 & 1 Edw. 8. c. 27
- Introduced by: Baron Feversham, 1 July 1936 (Second Reading) (Lords)
- Territorial extent: United Kingdom

Dates
- Royal assent: 14 July 1936
- Commencement: 14 July 1936 (Note: The Acts of Parliament (Commencement) Act 1793.)
- Repealed: 1 October 2014
Other legislation
Amends	Petroleum (Consolidation) Act 1928
Amended by	Petroleum (Regulation) Acts 1928 and 1936 (Repeals and Modifications) Regulations 1974; Health and Safety (Explosives and Petroleum Fees) (Modification) Regulations 1987; Health and Safety (Training for Employment) Regulations 1990
Repealed by	Petroleum (Consolidation) Regulations 2014 (SI 2014/1637)

Status: Repealed

Text of statute as originally enacted

The Petroleum (Transfer of Licences) Act 1936 (26 Geo. 5 & 1 Edw. 8. c. 27) was an act of the Parliament of the United Kingdom which empowered local authorities, that had granted licences to keep petroleum spirit, to transfer a licence to another person or persons.

The Petroleum (Transfer of Licences) Act (Northern Ireland) 1937 (1 Edw. 8 & 1 Geo. 6. c. 4 (N.I.)) is an act of Parliament of Northern Ireland which made provision for the transfer of petroleum spirit licences in Northern Ireland.

== Background ==
The Petroleum (Consolidation) Act 1928 (18 & 19 Geo. 5. c. 32) had prohibited the keeping of petroleum spirit without a licence. Local authorities were empowered under the 1928 act to grant petroleum-spirit licences, and they could attach such conditions as they thought expedient to such licences. In the case of a change of ownership of premises the licensing authority would transfer the licence to the new occupier. However, legal advice by the Home Office identified that in the absence of any express authorisation in the 1928 act, there was in fact no power to transfer a licence from a holder to another person. The 1936 Act remedied this defect and gave effect to the proper transfer of licences.

== Provisions ==
The act received royal assent on 14 July 1936. Its long title is: 'An Act to make provision with respect to the transfer of petroleum-spirit licences granted under the Petroleum (Consolidation) Act, 1928'.

The act comprised two sections. Section 1 empowered local authorities, and the Secretary of State, to transfer a petroleum spirit licence to another licensee. The act was retrospective and applied to licences transferred since the passing of the 1928 act. Section 2 construed the 1936 act to be one with the 1928 act and may be cited together as the Petroleum (Regulation) Acts 1928 and 1936.

== Petroleum (Transfer of Licences) Act (Northern Ireland) 1937 ==
Petroleum (Transfer of Licences) Act (Northern Ireland) 1937 (Note: Section 2(1).)
- Act of Parliament
- Parliament of Northern Ireland
- Long title: An Act to make provision with respect to the transfer of petroleum-spirit licences granted under the Petroleum (Consolidation) Act (Northern Ireland), 1929.
- Citation: 1 Edw. 8 & 1 Geo. 6. c. 4 (N.I.)
- Territorial extent: Northern Ireland

Dates
- Royal assent: 6 May 1937
- Commencement: 6 May 1937
Other legislation
Amends	Petroleum (Consolidation) Act (Northern Ireland) 1929
Amended by	Health and Safety at Work (Amendment) (Northern Ireland) Order 1998
Relates to	Petroleum (Consolidation) Act (Northern Ireland) 1929

Status: Amended

Revised text of statute as amended

Text of the Petroleum (Transfer of Licences) Act (Northern Ireland) 1937 as in force today (including any amendments) within the United Kingdom, from legislation.gov.uk.

The Petroleum (Transfer of Licences) Act (Northern Ireland) 1937 (1 Edw. 8 & 1 Geo. 6. c. 4 (N.I.)) is an act of the Parliament of Northern Ireland which made provision for the transfer of petroleum spirit licences in Northern Ireland.

The act received royal assent on 6 May 1937. Its long title is 'An Act to make provision with respect to the transfer of petroleum-spirit licences granted under the Petroleum (Consolidation) Act (Northern Ireland), 1929.' It comprised two sections

- Section 1. Transfer of petroleum-spirit licences.
  - (1) A local authority empowered to grant petroleum-spirit licences may transfer a petroleum-spirit licence, by endorsement of the licence or otherwise;
  - (2) The licence shall authorise the keeping of petroleum-spirit by the transferee and shall cease to authorise the keeping of petroleum spirit by any other person;
  - (3) The act shall have effect as if the provisions of this section had been contained in the original Act;
  - (4) In respect of a transfer of a petroleum-spirit licence made after the commencement of this Act, there shall be payable by the transferee a fee.
- Section 2. Short title, construction and citation.

The 1937 act shall be construed as one with the Petroleum (Consolidation) Act (Northern Ireland) 1929 (c. 13 (N.I.)), and that act and this may be cited together as the Petroleum (Regulation) Acts (Northern Ireland), 1929 and 1937. The 1937 act is still as of 2020 current legislation.

== Subsequent developments ==
The whole of the 1928 and 1936 acts were repealed by section 25(1) of, and schedule 4 to, the Petroleum (Consolidation) Regulations 2014 (SI 2014/1637), which came into force on 1 October 2014.

== See also ==
- Petroleum Act
