= Petroleum Act 1868 =

Act of the Parliament of the United Kingdom

Petroleum Act 1868 (Note: Section 1.)
- Act of Parliament
- Parliament of the United Kingdom
- Long title: An Act to amend the Act Twenty-fifth and Twenty-sixth Victoria, Chapter Sixty-six, for the safe keeping of Petroleum.
- Citation: 31 & 32 Vict. c. 56
- Territorial extent: United Kingdom

Dates
- Royal assent: 13 July 1868
- Commencement: 1 February 1869 (Note: Section 2.)
- Repealed: 21 August 1871
Other legislation
Amends	Petroleum Act 1862
Repealed by	Petroleum Act 1871

Status: Repealed

Text of statute as originally enacted

The Petroleum Act 1868 (31 & 32 Vict. c. 56) was an act of the Parliament of the United Kingdom to amend the Petroleum Act 1862 (25 & 26 Vict. c. 66) relating to the licensing, storage and sale of petroleum and petroleum products.

== Background ==
The original Petroleum Act 1862 (25 & 26 Vict. c. 66) was found to be defective. A Parliamentary Committee on Fire Protection had been established in 1867, to 'inquire into the existing legislative provisions for the protection of life and property against fires in the United Kingdom, and as to the best means for ascertaining the causes and preventing the frequency of fires'. Evidence given to the committee indicated that the Petroleum Act 1862 was inoperative; the committee's fourth (of four) recommendation was that the existing law should be amended to correct this deficiency. This was enacted through the provisions of the Petroleum Act 1868.

== Provisions ==
The act received royal assent on 13 July 1868. Its provisions came into effect on 1 February 1869. The act included the following provisions.

No petroleum shall be kept, other than for private use, within 50 yards of a dwelling house or a building in which goods are stored, except with a licence given by a local authority under the 1862 act. A licence may specify conditions regarding the mode of storage, the nature of the stored goods, the testing of petroleum, etc.

Petroleum kept in contravention of this provision was forfeit and there was a penalty of £20 for each day it was kept in contravention of the acts of 1862 and 1868.

A provision was made for the sale of petroleum for illumination. This stated that "no person shall sell or expose for sale or use within the United Kingdom any petroleum on or after 1 February 1869 which gives off inflammable vapour at a temperature of less than 100 °F unless the bottle or vessel... [has] a label... stating 'Great care must be taken in bringing any light near to the contents of this vessel, as they give off an inflammable vapour at a temperature of less than 100 degrees... Fahrenheit'".

For any offence in contravention of this section there was a penalty of £5.

Offences were to be tried by magistrates.

Power was given to Weights and Measures inspectors to test petroleum. A method of testing is described in the schedule of the act.

Petroleum is defined as "any bituminous substance as fires off an inflammable vapour at a temperature of less than 100 °F".

== Consequential legislation ==
The whole act was repealed by section 17 and schedule 2 of the Petroleum Act 1871 (34 & 35 Vict. c. 105), which came into force on 21 April 1871. However, some of the provisions, such as affixing a label prior to sale, were carried over into the 1871 act.

== See also ==
- History of fire safety legislation in the United Kingdom
- Petroleum Acts
