= Petroleum (Consolidation) Act (Northern Ireland) 1929 =

- Act of Parliament
- Parliament of Northern Ireland
- Long title: An Act to consolidate, as respects Northern Ireland, the enactments relating to petroleum and petroleum-spirit.
- Citation: 20 Geo. 5. c. 13 (N.I.)
- Territorial extent: Northern Ireland

Dates
- Royal assent: 19 December 1929
- Commencement: 19 December 1929

Other legislation
- Amends: Petroleum Acts 1871 to 1881
- Amended by: see text

Status: Amended

Text of statute as originally enacted

The Petroleum (Consolidation) Act (Northern Ireland) 1929 (20 Geo. 5. c. 13 (N.I.)) is an act of the Parliament of Northern Ireland which consolidates enactments relating to petroleum and petroleum products that already applied to other parts of the United Kingdom.

== Background ==
The Petroleum Act 1871 (34 & 35 Vict. c. 105) was still the principal act controlling the licensing, storage and use of petroleum and petroleum products in the late 1920s. It was recognised that considerable changes had taken place since 1871 in the use of petroleum, for example, the development of the motor car and the increased use of petrol by the public.

The Petroleum (Consolidation) Act 1928 (18 & 19 Geo. 5. c. 32) had updated and consolidated the existing petroleum legislation in England, Wales and Scotland but the Act did not extend to Northern Ireland. The Petroleum (Consolidation) Act (Northern Ireland) 1929 mirrored the provisions of the 1928 act and brought petroleum legislation up-to-date in Northern Ireland and made it consistent with the legislation in other parts of the UK.

== Legislative passage ==
The act was subject to scrutiny by a joint committee of the House of Commons and the Senate.

== Provisions ==
The act consolidated legislation concerning petroleum and petroleum spirit. The act gives Northern Ireland councils the authority to grant and transfer licences for the dispensing and storage of petroleum.

The act comprises 25 sections under 9 headings and 3 schedules

Licences for Keeping Petroleum-spirit

- Section 1. Petroleum-spirit not to be kept without a licence.
- Section 1A. Powers of local authority in relation to petroleum-spirit licences
- Section 2. Provisions as to licences.
- Section 3. Licensing Procedures and Appeals
- Section 4. Fees payable for licences

Labelling of Vessels containing Petroleum-spirit

- Section 5. Provisions as to the labelling of vessels containing petroleum-spirit.

Transport of Petroleum-spirit

- Section 6. Regulations as to the conveyance of petroleum-spirit by road.
- Section 7. Byelaws as to ships loading and carrying petroleum (Repealed by SR 1991/509) .
- Section 8. Notice of Ships carrying petroleum (Repealed by SR 1991/509)
- Section 9. Byelaws as to loading, conveyance and landing of petroleum (Repealed by SR 2003/152)

Special Provisions as to Keeping, Use and Supply of Petroleum-spirit for Motor Vehicles

- Section 10. Regulations as to the keeping and use of petroleum-spirit for purpose of motor vehicles, motor boats, aircraft and engines.
- Section 11. Repealed by 1972 NI 17

Regulations as to Special Classes of Petroleum-spirit

- Section 12. Regulations as to classes of petroleum-spirit likely to be dangerous or injurious to health.

Accidents in Connection with Petroleum-spirit

- Section 13. Notice of Accident (Repealed by SR 1981/339).
- Section 14. Inquiry into accidents connected with petroleum spirit. (Repealed by 2005 c. 12).
- Section 15. Coroners' inquests on deaths from accidents connected with petroleum-spirit.

Powers of Inspection, etc.

- Section 16. Powers of government inspectors.
- Section 17. Powers of officers of local authorities as to testing petroleum (Repealed by SR 2003/152).
- Section 18. Warrants to search for and seize petroleum-spirit.

Power to Apply Act to Other Substances

- Section 19. Power to make Orders in Council applying Act to other substances.

Supplementary

- Section 20. Test apparatus (Repealed by SR 1992/413).
- Section 21. Laying of regulations before Parliament.
- Section 22. Publication of certain byelaws.
- Section 23. Interpretation.
- Section 24. Savings.
- Section 24A. The provisions of this Act shall not apply where MHAR 2015 applies.
- Section 25. Short title and repeal.

Schedules

- Schedule 1. Repealed by SR 1992/396
- Schedule 2. Repealed by SR 1992/413
- Schedule 3. Repealed by SLR (NI) 1952

== Related legislation ==
"The Petroleum (Transfer of Licences) Act (Northern Ireland), 1937, shall be construed as one with the Petroleum (Consolidation) Act (Northern Ireland), 1929, and these Acts may be cited together as the Petroleum (Regulation) Acts (Northern Ireland), 1929 and 1937."

=== Later amendments ===
The 1929 act is still in force (as of November 2020). It has been amended by the following legislation.

- Statute Law Revision Act (Northern Ireland) 1952 chapter 1
- Planning (Northern Ireland) Order 1972 chapter 17
- Statutory Rule 1981/339
- Statutory Rule 1991/509 Dangerous Substances in Harbour Areas Regulations (Northern Ireland) 1991
- Statutory Rule 1992/396 The Health and Safety (Petroleum-Spirit Licence Fees) (Modification) Regulations (Northern Ireland) 1992
- Statutory Rule 1992/413 The Health and Safety (Miscellaneous Provisions) Regulations (Northern Ireland) 1992
- Statutory Rule 2003/152 Dangerous Substances and Explosive Atmospheres Regulations (Northern Ireland) 2003
- Act 2005 chapter 12
- Major Hazard Accident Regulations (Northern Ireland) 2015

== See also ==
- Petroleum Act
