= Petroleum (Consolidation) Act 1928 =

Act of the Parliament of the United Kingdom

Petroleum (Consolidation) Act 1928 (Note: Section 26(1).)
- Act of Parliament
- Parliament of the United Kingdom
- Long title: An Act to consolidate the enactments relating to petroleum and to petroleum-spirit.
- Citation: 18 & 19 Geo. 5. c. 32
- Territorial extent: England and Wales; Scotland; (Note: Section 26(2).)

Dates
- Royal assent: 3 August 1928
- Commencement: 4 August 1928 (Note: Section 26(5).)
- Repealed: 1 October 2014
Other legislation
| Amends | See § Repealed enactments |
| Repeals/revokes | See § Repealed enactments |
| Amended by | Petroleum (Transfer of Licences) Act 1936; Town and Country Planning Act 1947; Town and Country Planning (Scotland) Act 1947; London Government Act 1963; Petroleum (Regulation) Acts 1928 and 1936 (Repeals and Modifications) Regulations 1974; Statute Law (Repeals) Act 1993 |
| Repealed by | Petroleum (Consolidation) Regulations 2014 (SI 2014/1637) |
| Relates to | Petroleum (Amendment) Act 1928 |

Status: Repealed

Text of statute as originally enacted

Revised text of statute as amended

The Petroleum (Consolidation) Act 1928 (18 & 19 Geo. 5. c. 32) was an act of the Parliament of the United Kingdom to consolidate the enactments relating to petroleum and petroleum-spirit. It specified and updated the conditions for the granting of licenses for keeping petroleum spirit; the labelling of containers for petroleum spirit; its transport; and regulations for certain uses.

== Background ==
The Petroleum Act 1871 (34 & 35 Vict. c. 105) was still the principal act controlling the licensing, storage and use of petroleum and petroleum products in the late 1920s. It was recognised that considerable changes had taken place since 1871 in the use of petroleum such as the development of the motor car and the increased use of petrol by the public. It had also become difficult for local authorities to administer the law as it was distributed over a number of acts, and partly because the Petroleum Act 1871 was seen as not being well drafted and difficulties had arisen over interpretation.

The original Petroleum Act 1862 (25 & 26 Vict. c. 66) defined Petroleum Spirit as a substance that would give off a flammable vapour at less than 100 °F (38 °C). After several changes this was finally revised in 1879 to set a limit of 73 °F (23 °C).

=== Petroleum (Amendment) Act 1928 ===
Before the act could be enacted the existing legislation needed to be amended, requiring cleaning up several pieces of poor legislative draftsmanship so that this and other legislation then incorporated into the consolidated act.

Petroleum (Amendment) Act 1928 (Note: Section 10(1).)
- Act of Parliament
- Parliament of the United Kingdom
- Long title: An Act to amend the enactments relating to petroleum and to petroleum-spirit.
- Citation: 18 & 19 Geo. 5. c. 20
- Territorial extent: England and Wales; Scotland; (Note: Section 10(3).)

Dates
- Royal assent: 3 August 1928
- Commencement: 3 August 1928 (Note: The Acts of Parliament (Commencement) Act 1793.)
- Repealed: 4 August 1928
Other legislation
| Amends | Petroleum Act 1871; Locomotives on Highways Act 1896Petroleum Act 1926 |
| Repealed by | Petroleum (Consolidation) Act 1928 |
| Relates to | Petroleum (Consolidation) Act 1928 |

Status: Repealed

Text of statute as originally enacted

The Petroleum (Amendment) Act 1928 (18 & 19 Geo. 5. c. 20) comprised four sections. The first dealt with harbours and the definition of a "harbour authority" which had previously been ambiguous. Section 2 dealt with the making of bylaws for substances other than petroleum, such as calcium carbide. Section 3 dealt with the repeal of section 5 of the Locomotives on Highways Act 1896 (59 & 60 Vict. c. 36). That section was a concession applied to motor cars, which had then been considered to be light locomotives. Petrol had since been used for agricultural machinery, motorboats, stationary engines for electric lighting, and for pumping water. The Petroleum Act 1871 (34 & 35 Vict. c. 105) required a licence from the local authority, which was not necessary for these new applications. Section 4 gave canal companies a general power of making by-laws for the transport of petrol.

== Provisions ==
The act received royal assent on 3 August 1928. Its long title is 'An Act to consolidate the enactments relating to petroleum and to petroleum-spirit'. The act comprises 26 sections under nine headings plus three schedules

- Licences for Keeping Petroleum-Spirit
  - Section 1 Petroleum-spirit not to be kept without a licence
  - Section 2 Provisions as to licences
  - Section 3 Appeals from refusals by local authorities to grant licences
  - Section 4 Fees payable for licences
- Labelling of Vessels containing Petroleum-Spirit
  - Section 5 Provisions as to the labelling of vessels containing petroleum-spirit
- Transport of Petroleum-Spirit
  - Section 6 Regulations as to the conveyance of petroleum-spirit by road
  - Section 7 Byelaws as to ships loading and carrying petroleum-spirit in harbour
  - Section 8 Notice of ships carrying petroleum-spirit to be given on entering harbour
  - Section 9 Byelaws as to loading, conveyance and landing of petroleum-spirit in and upon canals
- Special Provisions as to Keeping, Use and Supply of Petroleum-Spirit for Motor Vehicles
  - Section 10 Regulations as to the keeping and use of petroleum-spirit for purpose of motor vehicles, motor boats, aircraft and engines
  - Section 11 Byelaws as to petroleum filling stations
- Regulations as to special Classes of Petroleum-Spirit
  - Section 12 Regulations as to classes of petroleum-spirit likely to be dangerous or injurious to health
- Accidents in connection with Petroleum-Spirit
  - Section 13 Notice to be given of accidents connected with petroleum-spirit
  - Section 14 Inquiry into accidents connected with petroleum-spirit
  - Section 15 Coroners' inquests on deaths from accidents connected with petroleum-spirit
- Powers of Inspection, &c
  - Section 16 Powers of government inspectors
  - Section 17 Powers of officers of local authorities as to testing petroleum-spirit
  - Section 18 Warrants to search for and seize petroleum-spirit
- Power to apply Act to other Substances
  - Section 19 Power to make Orders in Council applying Act to other substances
- Supplementary
  - Section 20 Provisions as to apparatus for and method of testing petroleum
  - Section 21 Regulations and byelaws to be laid before Parliament
  - Section 22 Confirmation and publication of byelaws
  - Section 23 Interpretation
  - Section 24 Application to Scotland
  - Section 25 Savings
  - Section 26 Short title, extent, repeal and commencement
- Schedules
  - First Schedule – Rates of Fees payable in respect of Licences to keep Petroleum-Spirit
  - Second Schedule – Apparatus to be used and Manner of testing Petroleum therewith so as to ascertain the Temperature at which it will give off Inflammable Vapour
  - Third Schedule – Enactments repealed

=== Repealed enactments ===
Section 26(3) of the act repealed 5 enactments, listed in the third schedule to the act.

| Citation | Short title | Extent of repeal |
|---|---|---|
| 34 & 35 Vict. c. 105 | Petroleum Act 1871 | The whole act. |
| 42 & 43 Vict. c. 47 | Petroleum Act 1879 | The whole act. |
| 13 & 14 Geo. 5. c. 4 | Fees (Increase) Act 1923 | Section four. |
| 16 & 17 Geo. 5. c. 25 | Petroleum Act 1926 | The whole act. |
| 18 & 19 Geo. 5. c. 20 | Petroleum (Amendment) Act 1928 | The whole act. |

== Subsequent developments ==
Section 2 of the Petroleum (Transfer of Licences) Act 1936 (26 Geo. 5 & 1 Edw. 8. c. 27) construed the 1936 act to be one with the 1928 act and they could be cited together as the Petroleum (Regulation) Acts 1928 and 1936.

The whole of the 1928 and 1936 acts were repealed by section 25(1) of, and schedule 4 to, the Petroleum (Consolidation) Regulations 2014 (SI 2014/1637), which came into force on 1 October 2014.

== See also ==
- History of fire safety legislation in the United Kingdom
- Petroleum Acts
