= Petroleum Act =

Stock short title used for legislation

Petroleum Act (with its variations) is a stock short title used internationally for legislation relating to petroleum.

== List ==
=== Bahamas ===
- The Petroleum Act 1971

=== Bangladesh ===
- The Petroleum Act 1934

=== India ===
- The Petroleum Act 1934

=== Iran ===
- The Petroleum Act 1987

=== Ireland ===
- The Petroleum and Other Minerals Development Act 1960 - Act No. 7/1960
- Irish National Petroleum Corporation Limited Act, 2001 - Act No. 26/2001
- Petroleum (Exploration and Extraction) Safety Act 2010 - Act No. 4/2010
- Petroleum (Exploration and Extraction) Safety Act 2015 - Act No. 26/2015
- Petroleum and Other Minerals Development (Prohibition of Onshore Hydraulic Fracturing) Act 2017 - Act No. 15/2017

=== Jamaica ===
- The Petroleum Act 1979

=== Kenya ===
- The Petroleum Act 2019

=== Malawi ===
- The Petroleum (Exploration and Production) Act 1984

=== Malaysia ===
- The Petroleum Development Act 1974
- The Petroleum and Electricity (Control of Supplies) Act 1974
- The Petroleum (Income Tax) Act 1967
- The Petroleum Mining Act 1966
- The Petroleum (Safety Measures) Act 1984

=== New Zealand ===
- The Petroleum Act 1937

=== Nigeria ===
- The Petroleum Act 1969

=== Norway ===
- The Petroleum Act 1996

=== Thailand ===
- The Petroleum Act 1971

=== Trinidad and Tobago ===
- The Petroleum Act 1969

=== United Kingdom ===
- The Petroleum Act 1998 (c. 17)
- The Petroleum Royalties (Relief) and Continental Shelf Act 1989 (c. 1)
- The Petroleum Act 1987 (c. 12)
- The Advance Petroleum Revenue Tax Act 1986 (c. 68)
- The Petroleum Royalties (Relief) Act 1983 (c. 59)
- The Petroleum Revenue Tax Act 1980 (c. 1)
- The Petroleum and Submarine Pipe-lines Act 1975 (c. 74)
- The Offshore Petroleum Development (Scotland) Act 1975 (c. 8)
- The Petroleum (Production) Act (Northern Ireland) 1964 (c. 28) (NI)
- The Petroleum (Transfer of Licences) Act (Northern Ireland) 1937 (c. 4) (NI)
- The Petroleum (Transfer of Licences) Act 1936 (26 Geo. 5 & 1 Edw. 8. c. 27)
- The Petroleum (Production) Act 1934 (24 & 25 Geo. 5. c. 36)
- The Petroleum (Consolidation) Act (Northern Ireland) 1929 (c. 13) (NI)
- The Petroleum (Consolidation) Act 1928 (18 & 19 Geo. 5. c. 32)
- The Petroleum (Amendment) Act 1928 (18 & 19 Geo. 5. c. 20)
- The Petroleum Act 1926 (16 & 17 Geo. 5. c. 25)
- The Petroleum (Production) Act 1918 (8 & 9 Geo. 5. c. 52)
- The Petroleum (Hawkers) Act 1881 (44 & 45 Vict. c. 67)
- The Petroleum Act 1879 (42 & 43 Vict. c. 47)
- The Petroleum Act 1871 (34 & 35 Vict. c. 105)
- The Petroleum Act 1868 (31 & 32 Vict. c. 56)
- The Petroleum Act 1862 (26 & 27 Vict. c. 66

The Petroleum Acts 1871 to 1881 was the collective title of the Petroleum Acts 1871 and 1879 and the Petroleum (Hawkers) Act 1881.

=== Zambia ===
- The Petroleum Act 1930

== See also ==
- List of short titles
- Electric or Electricity Act
- Gas Act
