= Petroleum Act 1926 =

Act of the Parliament of the United Kingdom

Petroleum Act 1926 (Note: Section 11(1).)
- Act of Parliament
- Parliament of the United Kingdom
- Long title: An Act to amend the Petroleum Acts, 1871 and 1879.
- Citation: 16 & 17 Geo. 5. c. 25
- Territorial extent: England and Wales; Scotland; (Note: Section 11(3).)

Dates
- Royal assent: 4 August 1926
- Commencement: 4 August 1926 (Note: The Acts of Parliament (Commencement) Act 1793)
- Repealed: 4 August 1928
Other legislation
Amends	Petroleum Act 1871; Petroleum Act 1879
Repeals/revokes	Petroleum (Hawkers) Act 1881
Repealed by	Petroleum (Consolidation) Act 1928

Status: Repealed

Text of statute as originally enacted

The Petroleum Act 1926 (16 & 17 Geo. 5. c. 25) was an act of the Parliament of the United Kingdom which amended and extended the Petroleum Act 1871 (34 & 35 Vict. c. 105) and Petroleum Act 1879 (42 & 43 Vict. c. 47).

== Background ==
The Petroleum Act 1871 (34 & 35 Vict. c. 105) and Petroleum Act 1879 (42 & 43 Vict. c. 47) were still the principal actscontrolling the licensing, storage and use of petroleum and petroleum products in the late 1920s. It was recognised that a considerable number of changes had taken place since the 1870s in the use of petroleum such as the development of the motor car and the increased use of petrol by the public. These included the storage and use of petroleum spirit for motor vehicles, motor boats, aircraft and other engines.

In 1913 the London Fire Brigade attended 50 instances of the overflow or leakage of petrol and 23 incidents of fire or explosion involving petrol. In 1920 the corresponding numbers were 77 overflows and 146 fires.

It was also expedient to included other substances such as methylated spirit, ether, carbon disulphide, tetraethyl-lead used as additives to gasoline, and compressed gases in metal cylinders.

The 1926 act was passed to address some of these issues.

== Provisions ==
The act received royal assent on 4 August 1926. The provisions of the act included:

- The act required that any conditions specified on a petroleum storage licence must be posted on the premises so as to be easily read. It was an offence for any person employed to breach any of the conditions.
- An occupier of premises must notify the Home Office if any explosion or fire associated with petroleum spirit occurs which causes death or injury.
- The Secretary of State was empowered to make general regulations for carrying petroleum spirit by road.
- The act introduced a revised scale of fees for licenses.
- The powers of local authorities (under Section 11 of the 1871 Act) in respect of dealers in petroleum spirit are extended to persons who keep petroleum spirit for any trade or industry.
- The test for petroleum spirit specified in the 1879 Act is amended. The instructions for testing are clarified, and test apparatus must be re-verified as specified.
- Government inspectors were empowered to enter premises where petroleum spirit is kept or suspected of being kept.
- Section 11 of the 1926 act specifies the act may be construed as one with the Petroleum Acts 1871 and 1879
- The first schedule of the 1926 act specified the method of testing the flash point of petroleum.

== Subsequent developments ==
The Petroleum (Mixtures) Order 1907 had been made to include mixtures of petroleum and other substances whether liquid, viscous or solid which had a flash point less than 73 °F. The Petroleum (Mixtures) Order 1927 was made on the 27 June 1927 to apply the provisions of the Petroleum Act 1926 to Petroleum Mixtures.

The whole act was repealed for the United Kingdom by section 26(3) of, and schedule 3 to, the Petroleum (Consolidation) Act 1928 (18 & 19 Geo. 5. c. 32), which came into force on 4 August 1928. The requirement for licensing, labelling, transportation, accident notification, powers of inspectors, etc. were re-enacted in the 1928 act. This remained a relevant statute until it was repealed on 1 October 2014 by The Petroleum (Consolidation) Regulations 2014 (S.I. 2014/1637), made under the Health and Safety at Work etc. Act 1974.

== See also ==
- Petroleum Act
