= Advance Petroleum Revenue Tax Act 1986 =

Act of the Parliament of the United Kingdom

Advance Petroleum Revenue Tax Act 1986 (Note: Section 2(1).)
- Act of Parliament
- Parliament of the United Kingdom
- Long title: An Act to provide for the repayment of certain amounts of advance petroleum revenue tax.
- Citation: 1986 c. 68
- Introduced by: Lord Beaverbrook 6 December 1986 (second reading) (Lords)
- Territorial extent: United Kingdom

Dates
- Royal assent: 18 December 1986
- Commencement: 18 December 1986 (Note: Section 4(b) of the Interpretation Act 1978.)
Other legislation
Relates to	Oil Taxation Act 1975

Status: Current legislation

Text of statute as originally enacted

Revised text of statute as amended

Text of the Advance Petroleum Revenue Tax Act 1986 as in force today (including any amendments) within the United Kingdom, from legislation.gov.uk.

The Advance Petroleum Revenue Tax Act 1986 (c. 68) is an act of the Parliament of the United Kingdom which provided for the repayment of advance petroleum revenue tax (APRT) to a participator in an oil field where the net profit period has not been reached.

== Background ==
The act implemented the proposal announced by the Chancellor of the Exchequer in the Autumn Statement to accelerate, on a targeted basis, the arrangements for the repayment of advance petroleum revenue tax due to oil companies.

The fall in world oil prices in 1986 had a serious impact on the economics of North Sea development, resulting in cutbacks in activity. Companies involved in North Sea activity had reassessed their plans to take low oil prices into account, but some of them faced the more immediate problems caused by a shortage of the cash available to go ahead with new and existing developments.

The act was aimed at alleviating companies' cash flow problems. It concentrated its effects on those companies where the reduction in cash flow from their North Sea operations could act as a real constraint on their ability to go ahead with development work. It also recognised the importance of providing finance for the companies as soon as possible in order to avoid any interruption to development activity by cash flow difficulties. Under the provisions of the APRT act, 75 per cent—that is, £230 million—of the total repayments went to independent, medium-sized and smaller companies. Repayments were subject to a limit of £15 million per company per field and, in all, the APRT Act increased the amount of cash available for investment in the North Sea by around £300 million.

== Provisions ==
The act received royal assent on 18 December 1986. Its long title is 'An Act to provide for the repayment of certain amounts of advance petroleum revenue tax'.

The act comprises two sections and a schedule:

- Section 1. Repayment of APRT where net profit period not yet reached.
- Section 2. Short title and construction
- Schedule. Net Profit period

Section 1 of the act provides for APRT to be paid to a participator in an oil field who was a participator in that field on 6 November 1986 and entitled on that date to a share of the oil won during the chargeable period ending on 31 December 1986, and for whom none of the chargeable periods ending before 1 July 1986 is his net profit period for the purposes of the act. On a claim, the participator is repaid the amount by which his APRT credit for the period ending on 31 December 1986 exceeds his provisional liability for petroleum revenue tax for that period in respect of the field, up to £15 million. The claim had to be made by 28 February 1987, in a form prescribed by the Board.

Section 1 of the act also disapplies the provision for interest on certain repayments of APRT in paragraph 10(4) of schedule 19 to the Finance Act 1982, treats a repayment as a repayment of the APRT paid latest, and disregards it in computing the participator's income for income tax or corporation tax. Section 2 of the act provides the short title and requires the act to be construed as one with part I of the Oil Taxation Act 1975. The schedule determines whether a chargeable period is a participator's net profit period by reference to the restriction of expenditure supplement in section 111 of the Finance Act 1981, and sets out the assumptions to be made about assessable profit or allowable loss where no notice of assessment or determination has been given.

== See also ==
- Oil and gas industry in the United Kingdom
- North Sea Oil
- Petroleum Act
