= Petroleum Act 1862 =

Act of the Parliament of the United Kingdom

Petroleum Act 1862 (Note: The citation of this act by this short title was authorised by section 2 of the Petroleum Act 1868 (31 & 32 Vict c 56). Due to the repeal of that act, it is now authorised by section 19(2) of the Interpretation Act 1978.)
- Act of Parliament
- Parliament of the United Kingdom
- Long title: An Act to provide for the Safe-keeping of Petroleum.
- Citation: 25 & 26 Vict. c. 66
- Territorial extent: United Kingdom

Dates
- Royal assent: 29 July 1862
- Commencement: 1 October 1862 (Note: Section 3.)
- Repealed: 21 August 1871
Other legislation
Amended by	Petroleum Act 1868
Repealed by	Petroleum Act 1871

Status: Repealed

Text of statute as originally enacted

The Petroleum Act 1862 (25 & 26 Vict. c. 66) was an act of the Parliament of the United Kingdom for the safe-keeping of petroleum.

== Background ==
The large-scale production of petroleum began in the United States in 1859 from oil wells in Pennsylvania. Within two years petroleum was being imported into the UK. It was estimated that in the year 1862 about 9 million gallons (40,915 m^{3}) of petroleum oil was imported from the United States. Concerns about the safe storage of petroleum and some of its flammable products, and the associated risks of fire and explosion, led to the passing of the UK's first Petroleum Act in 1862.

== Provisions ==
The act received royal assent on 29 July 1862. Its preamble reads 'whereas it is expedient to provide for the safe-keeping of petroleum and certain products thereof that are dangerous to life and property, from their properties of giving off inflammable vapours at low temperatures.'

The act comprises 10 sections:

- Section 1. Definitions: petroleum; borough; harbour; harbour authority. Petroleum and any relevant product were defined as that which gives off inflammable (flammable) vapour at a temperature of less than 100 °F (37.8 °C).
- Section 2. Regulations to be observed by a ship carrying petroleum
- Section 3. Regulations to be observed in storing petroleum. No more than 40 gallons (182 litres) of petroleum shall be stored within 50 yards (46 metres) of a house or a building where goods are stored, without a licence.
- Section 4. Definition of local authority
- Section 5. Mode of granting licences
- Section 6. In case of refusal of licence, the applicant may memorialize the Secretary of State
- Section 7. Forfeiture and penalties in England and Ireland
- Section 8. Recovery of forfeiture and penalties in Scotland
- Section 9. Search for petroleum
- Section 10. Reservation of previous powers with respect to inflammable substances

== Subsequent developments ==
Following the passage of the act local authorities placed advertisements in local newspapers to inform keepers of petroleum of the provisions and consequences of the 1862 act. These included: that no more than 40 gallons may be stored; that none should be kept within 50 yards of a dwelling house or a building used as a store; that sellers of petroleum should hold a license issued by the local authority. For example, the Metropolitan Board of Works placed adverts to this effect in the London Daily News on 9, 16 and 23 October 1862. Traders also placed advertisements identifying that they had obtained a licence.

The demand for petroleum continued to grow; the trade was mainly based in London and Liverpool. In 1869 it was estimated that there were 780,000 gallons (3,546 m^{3}) of petroleum stored in London.

The original Petroleum Act 1862 was found to be defective. A Parliamentary Committee on Fire Protection was established in 1867, to 'inquire into the existing legislative provisions for the protection of life and property against fires in the United Kingdom, and as to the best means for ascertaining the causes and preventing the frequency of fires'. Evidence given to the committee indicated that the Petroleum Act 1862 was inoperative; one of the committee's four recommendation was that the existing law should be amended to correct this deficiency. This was enacted through the provisions of the Petroleum Act 1868.

The whole act was repealed by section 17 and schedule 2 of the Petroleum Act 1871 (34 & 35 Vict. c. 105), which came into force on 21 April 1871.

== See also ==
- Petroleum Act

== Bibliography ==
- Rickards, George Kettilby. The Statutes of the United Kingdom of Great Britain and Ireland, 25 & 26 Victoria, 1862. Pages 331 to 335
- Woolrych, Edmund Humphrey. The Metropolis Local Management Acts. Shaw and Sons. Fetter Lane, London. 1863. Pages 535 to 539
- Glen, William Cunningham. Shelford's Law of Railways. Fourth Edition. Butterworths. London. 1869. Volume 1. Pages 255 to 258.
