= Petroleum Act 1871 =

Act of the Parliament of the United Kingdom

Petroleum Act 1871 (Note: Section 1.)
- Act of Parliament
- Parliament of the United Kingdom
- Long title: An Act for the safe keeping of petroleum and other substances of a like nature.
- Citation: 34 & 35 Vict. c. 105
- Territorial extent: United Kingdom

Dates
- Royal assent: 21 August 1871
- Commencement: 21 August 1871 (Note: The Acts of Parliament (Commencement) Act 1793.)
- Expired: 1 October 1872 (Note: Section 18.)
- Repealed: 4 August 1928
Other legislation
Repeals/revokes	Petroleum Act 1862; Petroleum Act 1868
Amended by	Petroleum Act 1879; Statute Law Revision Act 1883; Summary Jurisdiction Act 1884; Petroleum Act 1926; Petroleum (Amendment) Act 1928
Repealed by	Petroleum (Consolidation) Act 1928
Relates to	Petroleum (Hawkers) Act 1881

Status: Repealed

Text of statute as originally enacted

The Petroleum Act 1871 (34 & 35 Vict. c. 105) was an act of the Parliament of the United Kingdom to regulate the storage and transport of petroleum and similar substances.

== Background ==
The storage and transport of petroleum and petroleum products had been controlled by the Petroleum Act 1862 (25 & 26 Vict. c. 66) and Petroleum Act 1868 (31 & 32 Vict. c. 56). By 1871 the provisions of these Acts required to be updated; the 1871 act was intended to enact these requirements. The 1862 and 1868 acts were wholly repealed by the 1871 act.

== Provisions ==
The act received royal assent on 21 August 1871. Its long title is 'An Act for the safe keeping of petroleum and other substances of a like nature'. The act comprises 18 sections and two schedules:

- Section 1. Short title of Act
- Section 2. Interpretation of certain terms in the Act
- Section 3. Definition of Petroleum and application of Act
- Section 4. Bye-laws as to ship carrying petroleum
- Section 5. Notice by owner or master of ship carrying petroleum
- Section 6. Label on vessels containing petroleum
- Section 7. Regulations as to storage of petroleum
- Section 8. Definition of local authority
- Section 9. Mode of granting licenses
- Section 10. In case of refusal of licence
- Section 11. Testing of petroleum by officer of local authority
- Section 12. Penalty for refusing information and obstructing officer
- Section 13. Search for petroleum
- Section 14. Application of Act to other substances
- Section 15. Summary proceedings for offences, penalties &c.
- Section 16. Reservation of previous powers with respect to inflammable substances
- Section 17. Repeal of Acts
- Section 18. Duration of Act (until 1 October 1872)
- Schedule 1. Replaced by Schedule 1 of 1879 Act
- Schedule 2. Repealed by Statute Law Revision Act 1883

== Subsequent developments ==
The Petroleum Act 1871 was time-limited, it expired on 1 October 1872 (1871 act section 18). The 1871 act was continued by annual statutes until 1879. Section 4 of the Petroleum Act 1879 (42 & 43 Vict. c. 47) enacted that the 1871 act shall continue in force until otherwise directed by Parliament.

The 1871 act required harbour authorities to make by-laws regulating the trade in petroleum. The Thames Conservancy as harbour authority for the Port of London made bye-laws in 1872 which prohibited any vessel with a cargo of petroleum from proceeding above or westward of Thames Haven in Essex. Ships were required to offload cargo into covered barges for carriage into London.

The 1871 act was amended by the Petroleum Act 1879.

The 1871 and 1879 acts were still the principal acts controlling the licensing, storage and use of petroleum and petroleum products in the late 1920s.

The 1871 and 1879 acts remained in force until they were repealed for the United Kingdom by section 26(3) of, and schedule 3 to, the Petroleum (Consolidation) Act 1928 (18 & 19 Geo. 5. c. 32), which came into force on 4 August 1928.

The 1871 act applied to Ireland and remained a statute of the Republic of Ireland until 1972 when it was repealed by the Dangerous Substances Act 1972.

== See also ==
- Petroleum Act
