= List of acts of the Parliament of the United Kingdom from 1862 =

This is a complete list of acts of the Parliament of the United Kingdom for the year 1862.

Note that the first parliament of the United Kingdom was held in 1801; parliaments between 1707 and 1800 were either parliaments of Great Britain or of Ireland). For acts passed up until 1707, see the list of acts of the Parliament of England and the list of acts of the Parliament of Scotland. For acts passed from 1707 to 1800, see the list of acts of the Parliament of Great Britain. See also the list of acts of the Parliament of Ireland.

For acts of the devolved parliaments and assemblies in the United Kingdom, see the list of acts of the Scottish Parliament, the list of acts of the Northern Ireland Assembly, and the list of acts and measures of Senedd Cymru; see also the list of acts of the Parliament of Northern Ireland.

The number shown after each act's title is its chapter number. Acts passed before 1963 are cited using this number, preceded by the year(s) of the reign during which the relevant parliamentary session was held; thus the Union with Ireland Act 1800 is cited as "39 & 40 Geo. 3 c. 67", meaning the 67th act passed during the session that started in the 39th year of the reign of George III and which finished in the 40th year of that reign. Note that the modern convention is to use Arabic numerals in citations (thus "41 Geo. 3" rather than "41 Geo. III"). Acts of the last session of the Parliament of Great Britain and the first session of the Parliament of the United Kingdom are both cited as "41 Geo. 3".

Some of these acts have a short title. Some of these acts have never had a short title. Some of these acts have a short title given to them by later acts, such as by the Short Titles Act 1896.

== 25 & 26 Vict. ==
The fourth session of the 18th Parliament of the United Kingdom, which met from 6 February 1862 until 7 August 1862.

=== Public general acts ===
Short title	Citation	Royal assent
Long title
Consolidated Fund (£973,747) Act or the Supply Act 1862 (repealed)	25 & 26 Vict. c. 1	10 March 1862
An Act to apply the Sum of Nine hundred and seventy-three thousand seven hundred and forty-seven Pounds out of the Consolidated Fund to the Service of the Year ending the Thirty-first Day of March One thousand eight hundred and sixty-two. (Repealed by Statute Law Revision Act 1875 (38 & 39 Vict. c. 66))
Consolidated Fund (£18,000,000) Act or the Supply (No. 2) Act 1862 (repealed)	25 & 26 Vict. c. 2	24 March 1862
An Act to apply the Sum of Eighteen Millions out of the Consolidated Fund to the Service of the Year One thousand eight hundred and sixty-two. (Repealed by Statute Law Revision Act 1875 (38 & 39 Vict. c. 66))
Exchequer Bills Act 1862 (repealed)	25 & 26 Vict. c. 3	24 March 1862
An Act to amend an Act, intituled "An Act to amend the Law relating to Supply Exchequer Bills, and to charge the same on the Consolidated Fund"; (Note: Exchequer Bills Act 1861 (24 & 25 Vict. c. 5)) and to repeal all Provisions by which Authority is given to the Commissioners of Her Majesty's Treasury to fund Exchequer Bills. (Repealed by Exchequer Bills and Bonds Act 1866 (29 & 30 Vict. c. 25))
Officers' Commissions Act 1862	25 & 26 Vict. c. 4	11 April 1862
An Act to enable Her Majesty to issue Commissions to the Officers of Her Majesty’s Land Forces and Royal Marines, and to Adjutants and Quartermasters of Her Militia and Volunteer Forces, without affixing Her Royal Sign Manual thereto.
Mutiny Act 1862 (repealed)	25 & 26 Vict. c. 5	11 April 1862
An Act for punishing Mutiny and Desertion, and for the better Payment of the Army and their Quarters. (Repealed by Statute Law Revision Act 1875 (38 & 39 Vict. c. 66))
Marine Mutiny Act 1862 (repealed)	25 & 26 Vict. c. 6	11 April 1862
An Act for the Regulation of Her Majesty's Royal Marine Forces while on shore. (Repealed by Statute Law Revision Act 1875 (38 & 39 Vict. c. 66))
India Stock Transfer Act 1862 (repealed)	25 & 26 Vict. c. 7	11 April 1862
An Act to provide for the Registration and Transfer of India Stocks at the Bank of Ireland, and for the mutual Transfer of such Stocks from and to the Banks of England and Ireland respectively. (Repealed by Statute Law (Repeals) Act 1993 (c. 50))
Bleaching Works Act 1862 (repealed)	25 & 26 Vict. c. 8	11 April 1862
An Act to prevent the Employment of Women and Children during the Night in certain Operations connected with Bleaching by the open-air Process. (Repealed by Factory and Workshop Act 1870 (33 & 34 Vict. c. 62))
Sir J. Soane's Museum Act 1862 (repealed)	25 & 26 Vict. c. 9	11 April 1862
An Act to enable the Trustees of Sir John Soane's Museum to send Works of Art to the International Exhibition 1862. (Repealed by Statute Law Revision Act 1875 (38 & 39 Vict. c. 66))
Industrial Schools 1861 Acts Continuance Act 1862 (repealed)	25 & 26 Vict. c. 10	11 April 1862
An Act for continuing for a further limited Time, and for extending the Operation of Orders made under, "The Industrial Schools Act, 1861" (Note: Industrial Schools Act 1861 (24 & 25 Vict. c. 113)) and "The Industrial Schools (Scotland) Act, 1861." (Note: Industrial Schools (Scotland) Act 1861 (24 & 25 Vict. c. 132)) (Repealed by Industrial Schools Act 1866 (29 & 30 Vict. c. 118))
Australian Constitutions Act 1862	25 & 26 Vict. c. 11	11 April 1862
An Act to explain an Act, intituled "An Act for the better Government of Her Majesty's Australian Colonies". (Note: Australian Constitutions Act 1850 (13 & 14 Vict. c. 59))
Protection of Inventions and Designs Amendment Act 1862 (repealed)	25 & 26 Vict. c. 12	29 April 1862
An Act for the Protection of Inventions and Designs exhibited at the International Exhibition of Industry and Art for the Year One thousand eight hundred and sixty-two. (Repealed by Statute Law Revision Act 1875 (38 & 39 Vict. c. 66))
Exchequer Bonds Act 1862 (repealed)	25 & 26 Vict. c. 13	16 May 1862
An Act for raising the Sum of One million Pounds by Exchequer Bonds for the Service of the Year One thousand eight hundred and sixty-two. (Repealed by Statute Law Revision Act 1875 (38 & 39 Vict. c. 66))
Crown Suits (Isle of Man) Act 1862 (repealed)	25 & 26 Vict. c. 14	16 May 1862
An Act to extend to the Isle of Man the Provisions of the Act Eighteenth and Nineteenth Victoria, Chapter Ninety, (Note: Crown Suits Act 1855 (18 & 19 Vict. c. 90)) as to the Payment of Costs to and by the Crown. (Repealed by Statute Law (Repeals) Act 1989 (c. 43))
College of Physicians (Ireland) Act 1862	25 & 26 Vict. c. 15	16 May 1862
An Act to define the Powers of the President and Fellows of the King and Queen’s College of Physicians in Ireland with respect to the Election of its Fellows.
Netley Hospital Estate Act 1862 (repealed)	25 & 26 Vict. c. 16	16 May 1862
An Act for extinguishing certain Rights of Way through the Netley Hospital Estate in the Parish of Hound in the County of Southampton. (Repealed by Statute Law (Repeals) Act 1993 (c. 50))
Charitable Uses Act 1862 (repealed)	25 & 26 Vict. c. 17	16 May 1862
An Act to extend the Time for making Enrolments under the Act passed in the last Session of Parliament, intituled "An Act to amend the Law relating to the Conveyance of Land for Charitable Uses," (Note: Charitable Uses Act 1861 (24 & 25 Vict. c. 9)) and to explain and amend the said Act. (Repealed by Mortmain and Charitable Uses Act 1888 (51 & 52 Vict. c. 42))
Whipping Act 1862 (repealed)	25 & 26 Vict. c. 18	16 May 1862
An Act to amend the Law as to the whipping of Juvenile and other Offenders. (Repealed for England and Wales and Scotland by Criminal Justice Act 1948 (11 & 12 Geo. 6. c. 58) and for Northern Ireland by Treatment of Offenders Act (Northern Ireland) 1968 (c. 29 (N.I.)))
General Pier and Harbour Act 1861 Amendment Act or the General Pier and Harbour Act 1861 Amendment Act 1862	25 & 26 Vict. c. 19	16 May 1862
An Act to amend "The General Pier and Harbour Act, 1861." (Note: General Pier and Harbour Act 1861 (24 & 25 Vict. c. 45)) (Repealed for England and Wales and Scotland by Transport and Works Act 1992 (c. 42))
Habeas Corpus Act 1862	25 & 26 Vict. c. 20	16 May 1862
An Act respecting the Issue of Writs of Habeas Corpus out of England into Her Majesty's Possessions abroad.
Bank of Ireland, Transfer of Stocks Act 1862 (repealed)	25 & 26 Vict. c. 21	16 May 1862
An Act to amend the Law relating to the Transfer of Stocks and Annuities transferable at the Bank of Ireland. (Repealed by Statute Law Revision Act 1870 (33 & 34 Vict. c. 69))
Revenue Act 1862 or the Customs and Inland Revenue Act 1862 (repealed)	25 & 26 Vict. c. 22	3 June 1862
An Act to continue certain Duties of Inland Revenue for the Service of Her Majesty, and to grant, alter, and repeal certain other Duties. (Repealed by Customs Consolidation Act 1876 (39 & 40 Vict. c. 36), Statute Law Revision Act 1893 (56 & 57 Vict. c. 14), Customs and Excise Act 1952 (15 & 16 Geo. 6 & 1 Eliz. 2. c. 44), Finance Act 1960 (8 & 9 Eliz. 2. c. 44) and Finance Act 1975 (c. 7))
Summary Procedure on Bills of Exchange (Ireland) Act 1862 (repealed)	25 & 26 Vict. c. 23	3 June 1862
An Act to amend "The Summary Procedure on Bills of Exchange (Ireland) Act, 1861." (Note: Summary Procedure on Bills of Exchange (Ireland) Act 1861 (24 & 25 Vict. c. 43)) (Repealed by Statute Law Revision Act 1893 (56 & 57 Vict. c. 14))
Peace Preservation (Ireland) Act Continuance Act 1862 (repealed)	25 & 26 Vict. c. 24	30 June 1862
An Act to continue "The Peace Preservation (Ireland) Act, 1856," (Note: Peace Preservation (Ireland) Act 1856 (19 & 20 Vict. c. 36)) as amended by the Act of the Twenty-third and Twenty-fourth Years of Victoria, Chapter One hundred and thirty-eight. (Note: Peace Preservation (Ireland) Act 1860 (23 & 24 Vict. c. 138)) (Repealed by Statute Law Revision Act 1875 (38 & 39 Vict. c. 66))
Local Government Supplemental Act 1862	25 & 26 Vict. c. 25	30 June 1862
An Act to confirm certain Provisional Orders under the Local Government Act, 1858, (Note: Local Government Act 1858 (21 & 22 Vict. c. 98)) relating to the Districts of Hanley, Stroud, Ilfracombe, Longton, Halifax, Ipswich, and Sandown.
	Provisional Order for the Transfer of the Powers and Property of the Hanley Market Trustees to the Hanley Local Board.	
	Provisional Order for extending the Borrowing Powers of the Stroud Local Board of Health.	
	Provisional Order for extending the Borrowing Powers of the Ilfracombe Local Board of Health.	
	Provisional Order putting in force the Lands Clauses Consolidation Act, 1845, (Note: Lands Clauses Consolidation Act 1845 (8 & 9 Vict. c. 18)) within the District of the Longton Local Board, for the Purchase of Land by the said Board for Market Improvements.	
	Provisional Order putting in force the Lands Clauses Consolidation Act, 1845, within the District of the Halifax Local Board of Health, for the Purchase of Land by the said Board for Street Improvements.	
	Provisional Order putting in force the Lands Clauses Consolidation Act, 1845, within the District of the Local Board of Health for the Borough of Ipswich, in the County of Suffolk, for the Purchase of Lands by the said Board for Street Improvements.	
	Provisional Order repealing a Local Act (Note: Isle of Wight Roads Act 1813 (53 Geo. 3. c. xcii)) in force within the District of the Sandown Local Board.	
Oxford University Act 1862	25 & 26 Vict. c. 26	30 June 1862
An Act to extend the Power of making Statutes possessed by the University of Oxford, and to make further Provision for the Administration of Justice in the Court of the Chancellor of the said University.
British Forces in India Act 1862 (repealed)	25 & 26 Vict. c. 27	30 June 1862
An Act to authorize Payments for a further Period out of the Revenues of India in respect of the Retiring Pay, Pensions, and other Expenses of that Nature of Her Majesty's British Forces serving in India. (Repealed by Statute Law Revision Act 1875 (38 & 39 Vict. c. 66))
Universities (Scotland) Act 1862 (repealed)	25 & 26 Vict. c. 28	30 June 1862
An Act to alter and amend the Universities (Scotland) Act (Note: Universities (Scotland) Act 1858 (21 & 22 Vict. c. 83)) in so far as relates to the Bequest of the late Doctor Alexander Murray in the University of Aberdeen. (Repealed by Statute Law Revision Act 1875 (38 & 39 Vict. c. 66))
Landed Property Improvement (Ireland) Act 1862 (repealed)	25 & 26 Vict. c. 29	30 June 1862
An Act to amend and enlarge the Acts for the Improvement of Landed Property in Ireland. (Repealed by Statute Law Revision Act 1875 (38 & 39 Vict. c. 66), Statute Law Revision Act 1893 (56 & 57 Vict. c. 14) and Public Works, etc., Loans Act (Northern Ireland) 1953 (c. 13 (N.I.)))
Advances for Public Works Act 1862 (repealed)	25 & 26 Vict. c. 30	30 June 1862
An Act to amend an Act of the last Session (Note: Advances for Public Works Act 1861 (24 & 25 Vict. c. 80)) for authorizing Advances of Money out of the Consolidated Fund for carrying on Public Works and Fisheries for Employment of the Poor, and for facilitating the Construction and Improvement of Harbours, and for other Purposes. (Repealed by Public Works Loans Act 1875 (38 & 39 Vict. c. 89))
Consolidated Fund (£10,000,000) Act or the Supply (No. 3) Act 1862 (repealed)	25 & 26 Vict. c. 31	7 July 1862
An Act to apply the sum of Ten Millions out of the Consolidated Fund to the Service of the Year One thousand eight hundred and sixty-two. (Repealed by Statute Law Revision Act 1875 (38 & 39 Vict. c. 66))
Unlawful Oaths (Ireland) Act 1862 or the Unlawful Oaths (Ireland) Act Continuance Act 1862 or the Unlawful Oaths Continuance Act or the Unlawful Oaths Act 1862 (repealed)	25 & 26 Vict. c. 32	7 July 1862
An Act to continue the Act of the Second and Third Years of Victoria, Chapter Seventy-four, (Note: Unlawful Societies (Ireland) Act 1839 (2 & 3 Vict. c. 74)) for preventing the administering of unlawful Oaths in Ireland, as amended by an Act of the Eleventh and Twelfth Years of Victoria. (Note: Unlawful Combinations (Ireland) Act 1848 (11 & 12 Vict. c. 89)) (Repealed by Statute Law Revision Act 1875 (38 & 39 Vict. c. 66))
Sandhurst Vesting Act 1862 or the Sandhurst Act 1862	25 & 26 Vict. c. 33	7 July 1862
An Act for vesting in Her Majesty's Principal Secretary of State for the War Department the Lands of the Royal Military College at Sandhurst, and for completing certain Exchanges of Lands now or late of the said College.
Discontinuance of Portsdown Fair, Southampton Act 1862 or the Portsdown Fair Act 1862 (repealed)	25 & 26 Vict. c. 34	7 July 1862
An Act for the Discontinuance of Portsdown Fair in the County of Southampton. (Repealed by Statute Law (Repeals) Act 1989 (c. 43))
Public Houses Acts Amendment (Scotland) Act 1862 (repealed)	25 & 26 Vict. c. 35	7 July 1862
An Act to amend the Acts for the Regulation of Public Houses in Scotland. (Repealed by Licensing (Scotland) Act 1903 (3 Edw. 7. c. 25))
Artillery Ranges Act 1862	25 & 26 Vict. c. 36	17 July 1862
An Act to appropriate certain Portions of Land lying between High and Low Water Mark, situate in the Parishes of Shoebury and Wakering in the County of Essex, as Ranges for the Use and Practice of Artillery.
Crown Private Estates Act 1862	25 & 26 Vict. c. 37	17 July 1862
An Act to remove doubts concerning, and to amend the law relating to, the private estates of Her Majesty, her heirs and successors.
Sale of Spirits Act 1862 (repealed)	25 & 26 Vict. c. 38	17 July 1862
An Act to amend the Laws relating to the Sale of Spirits. (Repealed by Administration of Justice Act 1965 (c. 2))
Red Sea and India Telegraph Company Act 1862 (repealed)	25 & 26 Vict. c. 39	17 July 1862
An Act for enabling the Commissioners of Her Majesty's Treasury to make Arrangements with the Red Sea and India Telegraph Company. (Repealed by Statute Law Revision Act 1950 (14 Geo. 6. c. 6))
African Slave Trade Treaty Act (No. 1) 1862 or the African Slave Trade Act 1862 (repealed)	25 & 26 Vict. c. 40	17 July 1862
An Act to carry into effect the Treaty between Her Majesty and the United States of America for the Suppression of the African Slave Trade. (Repealed by Slave Trade Act 1873 (36 & 37 Vict. c. 88))
Rifle Volunteer Grounds Act 1862 (repealed)	25 & 26 Vict. c. 41	17 July 1862
An Act for amending "The Rifle Volunteer Grounds Act, 1860." (Note: Rifle Volunteer Grounds Act 1860 (23 & 24 Vict. c. 140)) (Repealed by Volunteer Act 1863 (26 & 27 Vict. c. 65))
Chancery Regulation Act 1862 or Rolt's Act (repealed)	25 & 26 Vict. c. 42	17 July 1862
An Act to regulate the Procedure in the High Court of Chancery and the Court of Chancery of the County Palatine of Lancaster. (Repealed by Statute Law Revision and Civil Procedure Act 1883 (46 & 47 Vict. c. 49))
Poor Law (Certified Schools) Act 1862 (repealed)	25 & 26 Vict. c. 43	17 July 1862
An Act to provide for the Education and Maintenance of Pauper Children in certain Schools and Institutions. (Repealed by Poor Law Act 1927 (17 & 18 Geo. 5. c. 14))
Discharged Prisoners' Aid Act 1862 (repealed)	25 & 26 Vict. c. 44	17 July 1862
An Act to amend the Law relating to the giving of Aid to discharged Prisoners. (Repealed by Prison Act 1952 (15 & 16 Geo. 6 & 1 Eliz. 2. c. 52))
West Indian Incumbered Estates Act 1862 (repealed)	25 & 26 Vict. c. 45	17 July 1862
An Act to amend "The West Indian Incumbered Estates Acts, 1854 (Note: West Indian Incumbered Estates Act 1854 (17 & 18 Vict. c. 117)) and 1858. (Note: West Indian Incumbered Estates Act 1858 (21 & 22 Vict. c. 96))" (Repealed by West Indian Incumbered Estates Act 1886 (49 & 50 Vict. c. 36))
Chancery Regulation (Ireland) Act 1862 (repealed)	25 & 26 Vict. c. 46	17 July 1862
An Act for the better Regulation in certain Cases of the Procedure in the High Court of Chancery in Ireland. (Repealed by Statute Law Revision Act 1893 (56 & 57 Vict. c. 14))
Annual Inclosure Act 1862	25 & 26 Vict. c. 47	29 July 1862
An Act to authorize the Inclosure of certain Lands in pursuance of a Report of the Inclosure Commissioners for England and Wales.
New Zealand Constitution Act 1862 (repealed)	25 & 26 Vict. c. 48	29 July 1862
An Act respecting the Establishment and Government of Provinces in New Zealand, and to enable the Legislature of New Zealand to repeal the Seventy-third Section of an Act, intituled "An Act to grant a Representative Constitution to the Colony of New Zealand." (Note: New Zealand Constitution Act 1852 (15 & 16 Vict. c. 72)) (Repealed by Statute Law Revision Act 1893 (56 & 57 Vict. c. 14))
Duchy of Cornwall Lands Act 1862 (repealed)	25 & 26 Vict. c. 49	29 July 1862
An Act to authorize the Completion, after His Royal Highness Albert Edward Prince of Wales shall attain the Age of Twenty-one Years, of Arrangements commenced during his Minority, under the Provisions of an Act passed in the Session of Parliament held in the Seventh and Eighth Years of the Reign of Her Majesty Queen Victoria, intituled "An Act to enable the Council of His Royal Highness Albert Edward Prince of Wales to sell and exchange Lands and enfranchise Copyholds Parcel of the Possessions of the Duchy of Cornwall, to purchase other Lands; and for other Purposes." (Note: Duchy of Cornwall Act 1844 (7 & 8 Vict. c. 65)) (Repealed by Statute Law (Repeals) Act 1977 (c. 18))
Summary Jurisdiction (Ireland) Act 1862 (repealed)	25 & 26 Vict. c. 50	29 July 1862
An Act to amend certain Provisions of the Acts of the Twenty-fourth and Twenty-fifth Years of Her Majesty, Chapters Ninety-six, (Note: Larceny Act 1861 (24 & 25 Vict. c. 96)) Ninety-seven, (Note: Malicious Damage Act 1861 (24 & 25 Vict. c. 97)) Ninety-nine, (Note: Coinage Offences Act 1861 (24 & 25 Vict. c. 99)) and One hundred (Note: Offences against the Person Act 1861 (24 & 25 Vict. c. 100)) respectively, relating to Summary Jurisdiction in Ireland. (Repealed by Statute Law Revision Act 1893 (56 & 57 Vict. c. 14), Criminal Justice Act (Northern Ireland) 1945 (c. 15 (N.I.)), Criminal Justice Act (Northern Ireland) 1953 (c. 14 (N.I.)), Statute Law Revision Act (Northern Ireland) 1954 (c. 35 (N.I.)), Criminal Justice (Miscellaneous Provisions) Act (Northern Ireland) 1968 (c. 28 (N.I.)) and Theft Act (Northern Ireland) 1969 (c. 16 (N.I.)))
Pier and Harbour Orders Confirmation Act 1862	25 & 26 Vict. c. 51	29 July 1862
An Act for confirming with Amendments certain Provisional Orders made by the Board of Trade under The General Pier and Harbour Act, 1861, and The General Pier and Harbour Act, 1861, Amendment Act, (Note: General Pier and Harbour Act 1861 Amendment Act 1862 (25 & 26 Vict. c. 19)) relating to Carrickfergus, Deal, Oban, Saint Ives, Tobermory, and Hastings.
	Provisional Order of the Board of Trade for the Improvement, Maintenance, and Regulation of the Harbour of Carrickfergus in the County of the Town of Carrickfergus.	
	Provisional Order of the Board of Trade for the Construction, Maintenance, and Regulation of a Pier at Deal in the County of Kent.	
	Provisional Order of the Board of Trade for the Improvement, Maintenance, and Regulation of the Harbour of Oban in the County of Argyll.	
	Provisional Order of the Board of Trade for the Improvement, Maintenance, and Regulation of the Harbour of Saint Ives in the County of Cornwall.	
	Provisional Order of the Board of Trade for the Construction, Maintenance, and Regulation of a Pier at Tobermory in the Island of Mull and County of Argyll.	
	Provisional Order of the Board of Trade for the Construction, Maintenance, and Regulation of a Pier and Harbour at Hastings in the County of Sussex.	
Ecclesiastical Leases Act 1862 (repealed)	25 & 26 Vict. c. 52	29 July 1862
An Act to amend an Act of the Twenty-fourth and Twenty-fifth Years of the Reign of Her Majesty, (Note: Ecclesiastical Leases Act 1861 (24 & 25 Vict. c. 105)) to prevent the future Grant by Copy of Court Roll and certain Leases of Lands and Hereditaments in England belonging to Ecclesiastical Benefices. (Repealed by Endowments and Glebe Measure 1976 (No. 4))
Land Registry Act 1862 (repealed)	25 & 26 Vict. c. 53	29 July 1862
An Act to facilitate the Proof of Title to, and the Conveyance of, Real Estates. (Repealed by Land Registration Act 2002 (c. 9))
Lunacy (Scotland) Act 1862 (repealed)	25 & 26 Vict. c. 54	29 July 1862
An Act to make further Provision respecting Lunacy in Scotland. (Repealed by Mental Health (Scotland) Act 1960 (8 & 9 Eliz. 2. c. 61))
Jamaica Loan Act 1862 (repealed)	25 & 26 Vict. c. 55	29 July 1862
An Act for the Settlement of a Loan due from the Island of Jamaica to the Imperial Government. (Repealed by Statute Law Revision Act 1964 (c. 79))
Provisional Orders Confirmation (Turnpikes) Act 1862 (repealed)	25 & 26 Vict. c. 56	29 July 1862
An Act to confirm certain Provisional Orders made under an Act of the Fifteenth Year of Her present Majesty, (Note: Turnpike Trusts (Making of Provisional Orders) Act 1851 (14 & 15 Vict. c. 38)) to facilitate Arrangements for the Relief of Turnpike Trusts. (Repealed by Statute Law (Repeals) Act 1981 (c. 19))
Crown Lands (Windsor) (repealed)	25 & 26 Vict. c. 57	29 July 1862
An Act to authorize the Sale of Her Majesty's Bakehouse in Peascod Street, Windsor, and the Application of the Proceeds in the Purchase of Land or Buildings to be held with Windsor Castle. (Repealed by Statute Law (Repeals) Act 1993 (c. 50))
Parochial Buildings (Scotland) Act 1862 (repealed)	25 & 26 Vict. c. 58	29 July 1862
An Act to make further Provision with respect to the raising of Money for erecting and improving Parochial Buildings in Scotland. (Repealed by Abolition of Feudal Tenure etc. (Scotland) Act 2000 (asp 5))
Dogs (Ireland) Act 1862 (repealed)	25 & 26 Vict. c. 59	29 July 1862
An Act to render Owners of Dogs in Ireland liable for Injuries to Sheep. (Repealed by Dogs Act 1906 (6 Edw. 7. c. 32))
Indemnity Act 1862 (repealed)	25 & 26 Vict. c. 60	29 July 1862
An Act to indemnify such Persons in the United Kingdom as have omitted to qualify themselves for Offices and Employments, and to extend the Time limited for those Purposes respectively. (Repealed by Promissory Oaths Act 1871 (34 & 35 Vict. c. 48))
Highway Act 1862 (repealed)	25 & 26 Vict. c. 61	29 July 1862
An Act for the better Management of Highways in England. (Repealed by Highways Act 1959 (7 & 8 Eliz. 2. c. 25) and London Government Act 1963 (c. 33))
County Elections (Ireland) Act 1862 (repealed)	25 & 26 Vict. c. 62	29 July 1862
An Act to amend the Law relating to the Duration of contested Elections for Counties in Ireland and for establishing additional Places for taking the Poll thereat. (Repealed by Representation of the People Act 1948 (11 & 12 Geo. 6. c. 65))
Merchant Shipping Act Amendment Act 1862 (repealed)	25 & 26 Vict. c. 63	29 July 1862
An Act to amend "The Merchant Shipping Act, 1854," (Note: Merchant Shipping Act 1854 (17 & 18 Vict. c. 104)) "The Merchant Shipping Act Amendment Act, 1855," (Note: Merchant Shipping Act Amendment Act 1855 (18 & 19 Vict. c. 91)) and "The Customs Consolidation Act, 1853." (Note: Customs Consolidation Act 1853 (16 & 17 Vict. c. 107)) (Repealed by Merchant Shipping Act 1894 (57 & 58 Vict. c. 60))
Naval and Victualling Stores Act 1862 (repealed)	25 & 26 Vict. c. 64	29 July 1862
An Act for the better Protection of Her Majesty's Naval and Victualling Stores. (Repealed by Naval and Victualling Stores Act 1864 (27 & 28 Vict. c. 91))
Jurisdiction in Homicides Act 1862 (repealed)	25 & 26 Vict. c. 65	29 July 1862
An Act for the more speedy Trial of certain Homicides committed by Persons subject to the Mutiny Act. (Note: Mutiny Act 1862 (25 & 26 Vict. c. 5)) (Repealed by Statute Law Revision Act 1958 (6 & 7 Eliz. 2. c. 46))
Petroleum Act 1862 (repealed)	25 & 26 Vict. c. 66	29 July 1862
An Act to provide for the Safe-keeping of Petroleum. (Repealed by Petroleum Act 1871 (34 & 35 Vict. c. 105))
Declaration of Title Act 1862 (repealed)	25 & 26 Vict. c. 67	29 July 1862
An Act for obtaining a Declaration of Title. (Repealed by Statute Law Revision Act 1958 (6 & 7 Eliz. 2. c. 46))
Fine Arts Copyright Act 1862 (repealed)	25 & 26 Vict. c. 68	29 July 1862
An Act for amending the Law relating to Copyright in Works of the Fine Arts, and for repressing the Commission of Fraud in the Production and Sale of such Works. (Repealed by Copyright Act 1956 (4 & 5 Eliz. 2. c. 74))
Harbours Transfer Act 1862	25 & 26 Vict. c. 69	29 July 1862
An Act for transferring from the Admiralty to the Board of Trade certain Powers and Duties relative to Harbours and Navigation under Local and other Acts; and for other Purposes.
Extradition Act 1862 (repealed)	25 & 26 Vict. c. 70	29 July 1862
An Act for giving effect to a Convention between Her Majesty and the King of Denmark for the mutual Surrender of Criminals. (Repealed by Extradition Act 1870 (33 & 34 Vict. c. 52))
Appropriation Act 1862 (repealed)	25 & 26 Vict. c. 71	7 August 1862
An Act to apply a Sum out of the Consolidated Fund and the Surplus of Ways and Means to the Service of the Year One thousand eight hundred and sixty-two, and to appropriate the Supplies granted in this Session of Parliament. (Repealed by Statute Law Revision Act 1875 (38 & 39 Vict. c. 66))
Annual Turnpike Acts Continuance Act 1862 (repealed)	25 & 26 Vict. c. 72	7 August 1862
An Act to continue certain Turnpike Acts in Great Britain. (Repealed by Statute Law Revision Act 1875 (38 & 39 Vict. c. 66))
Copyhold, etc., Commission Continuance Act 1862 (repealed)	25 & 26 Vict. c. 73	7 August 1862
An Act for continuing the Copyhold, Inclosure, and Tithe Commission, and entitling the Commissioners to Superannuation Allowance. (Repealed by Board of Agriculture Act 1889 (52 & 53 Vict. c. 30))
Westminster Offices Act 1862	25 & 26 Vict. c. 74	7 August 1862
An Act to enable the Commissioners of Her Majesty's Works to acquire additional Land for the Purposes of the "Public Offices Extension Act of 1859," (Note: Public Offices Extension Act 1859 (22 Vict. c. 19)) by way of Exchange for Land already acquired but not wanted for the Purposes of the said Act.
Savings Banks (Ireland) Continuance Act 1862 (repealed)	25 & 26 Vict. c. 75	7 August 1862
An Act to revive and continue an Act (Note: Savings Banks (Ireland) Act 1848 (11 & 12 Vict. c. 133)) for amending the Laws relating to Savings Banks in Ireland. (Repealed by Statute Law Revision Act 1875 (38 & 39 Vict. c. 66))
Weights and Measures (Ireland) Amendment Act 1862 (repealed)	25 & 26 Vict. c. 76	7 August 1862
An Act to amend "The Weights and Measures (Ireland) Act, 1860;" (Note: Weights and Measures (Ireland) Act 1860 (23 & 24 Vict. c. 119)) to abolish local and customary Denominations of Weight, and to regulate the Mode of weighing Articles sold, in Ireland. (Repealed by Weights and Measures Act (Northern Ireland) 1967 (c. 6 (N.I.)))
Militia Ballots Suspension Act 1862 (repealed)	25 & 26 Vict. c. 77	7 August 1862
An Act to suspend the making of Lists and the Ballots for the Militia of the United Kingdom. (Repealed by Statute Law Revision Act 1875 (38 & 39 Vict. c. 66))
Royal Arsenals, etc. Act 1862 (repealed)	25 & 26 Vict. c. 78	7 August 1862
An Act for providing a further Sum towards defraying the Expenses of constructing Fortifications for the Protection of the Royal Arsenals and Dockyards and the Ports of Dover and Portland, and of creating a Central Arsenal. (Repealed by Revenue, Friendly Societies, and National Debt Act 1882 (45 & 46 Vict. c. 72))
Coal Mines Act 1862 (repealed)	25 & 26 Vict. c. 79	7 August 1862
An Act to amend the Law relating to Coal Mines. (Repealed by Coal Mines Regulation Act 1872 (35 & 36 Vict. c. 76))
Militia Pay Act 1862 (repealed)	25 & 26 Vict. c. 80	7 August 1862
An Act to defray the Charge of the Pay, Clothing, and contingent and other Expenses of the Disembodied Militia in Great Britain and Ireland; to grant Allowances in certain Cases to Subaltern Officers, Adjutants, Paymasters, Quartermasters, Surgeons, Assistant Surgeons, and Surgeons Mates of the Militia; and to authorize the Employment of the Non-commissioned Officers. (Repealed by Statute Law Revision Act 1875 (38 & 39 Vict. c. 66))
Perpetuation of Matrimonial Causes Act 1860 Act 1862 (repealed)	25 & 26 Vict. c. 81	7 August 1862
An Act to make perpetual "An Act to amend the Procedure and Powers of the Court for Divorce and Matrimonial Causes." (Note: Matrimonial Causes Act 1860 (23 & 24 Vict. c. 144)) (Repealed by Statute Law Revision Act 1875 (38 & 39 Vict. c. 66))
Poor Rates Recovery Act 1862	25 & 26 Vict. c. 82	7 August 1862
An Act for the more economical Recovery of Poor Rates and other Local Rates and Taxes.
Poor Relief (Ireland) Act 1862 (repealed)	25 & 26 Vict. c. 83	7 August 1862
An Act to amend the Laws in force for the Relief of the destitute Poor in Ireland, and to continue the Powers of the Commissioners. (Repealed by Rates (Northern Ireland) Order 1972 (SI 1972/1633 (N.I. 16)))
Excise Duties Act 1862 (repealed)	25 & 26 Vict. c. 84	7 August 1862
An Act to continue the Duties of Excise on Sugar made in the United Kingdom, and to amend the Laws relating to the Duties of Excise. (Repealed by Statute Law Revision Act 1893 (56 & 57 Vict. c. 14))
Transmission of Moveable Property (Scotland) Act 1862	25 & 26 Vict. c. 85	7 August 1862
An Act to facilitate the transmission of moveable property in Scotland.
Lunacy Regulation Act 1862 (repealed)	25 & 26 Vict. c. 86	7 August 1862
An Act to amend the Law relating to Commissions of Lunacy and the Proceedings under the same, and to provide more effectually for the visiting of Lunatics, and for other Purposes. (Repealed by Lunacy Act 1890 (53 & 54 Vict. c. 5))
Industrial and Provident Societies Act 1862 (repealed)	25 & 26 Vict. c. 87	7 August 1862
An Act to consolidate and amend the Laws relating to Industrial and Provident Societies. (Repealed by Industrial and Provident Societies Act 1876 (39 & 40 Vict. c. 45))
Merchandise Marks Act 1862 (repealed)	25 & 26 Vict. c. 88	7 August 1862
An Act to amend the Law relating to the fraudulent marking of Merchandise. (Repealed by Merchandise Marks Act 1887 (50 & 51 Vict. c. 28))
Companies Act 1862 (repealed)	25 & 26 Vict. c. 89	7 August 1862
An Act for the Incorporation, Regulation, and Winding-up of Trading Companies and other Associations. (Repealed by Companies (Consolidation) Act 1908 (8 Edw. 7. c. 69))
African Slave Trade Treaty Act (No. 2) 1862 or the African Slave Trade Act 1862 (repealed)	25 & 26 Vict. c. 90	7 August 1862
An Act for rectifying a clerical Error in the Act of the present Session, Chapter Forty, (Note: African Slave Trade Treaty Act (No. 1) 1862 (25 & 26 Vict. c. 40)) with respect to the African Slave Trade Treaty. (Repealed by Slave Trade Act 1873 (36 & 37 Vict. c. 88))
Medical Council Act 1862 (repealed)	25 & 26 Vict. c. 91	7 August 1862
An Act to incorporate the General Council of Medical Education and Registration of the United Kingdom, and for other Purposes. (Repealed by Medical Act 1956 (4 & 5 Eliz. 2. c. 76))
Elections (Ireland) Act 1862 (repealed)	25 & 26 Vict. c. 92	7 August 1862
An Act to limit the Time for proceeding to Elections in Counties and Boroughs in Ireland. (Repealed by Parliament (Elections and Meeting) Act 1943 (6 & 7 Geo. 6. c. 48))
Thames Embankment Act 1862	25 & 26 Vict. c. 93	7 August 1862
An Act for embanking the North Side of the River Thames from Westminster Bridge to Blackfriars Bridge, and for making new Streets in and near thereto.
Second Annual Inclosure Act 1862	25 & 26 Vict. c. 94	7 August 1862
An Act to authorize the Inclosure of certain Lands in pursuance of a Special Report of the Inclosure Commissioners.
Parliamentary Elections Act 1862 (repealed)	25 & 26 Vict. c. 95	7 August 1862
An Act to amend the Law relating to Polling Places in the Boroughs of New Shoreham, Cricklade, Aylesbury, and East Retford. (Repealed by Ballot Act 1872 (35 & 36 Vict. c. 33))
Court of Common Pleas Act 1862 (repealed)	25 & 26 Vict. c. 96	7 August 1862
An Act to render tenable during good Behaviour the Office of the Officer of the Court of Common Pleas by whom the Certificates of Acknowledgment of Deeds of married Women are filed of Record. (Repealed by Supreme Court of Judicature (Officers) Act 1879 (42 & 43 Vict. c. 78))
Salmon Fisheries (Scotland) Act 1862 (repealed)	25 & 26 Vict. c. 97	7 August 1862
An Act to regulate and amend the Law respecting the Salmon Fisheries of Scotland. (Repealed by Salmon Act 1986 (c. 62))
Gunpowder Act Amendment Act 1862 (repealed)	25 & 26 Vict. c. 98	7 August 1862
An Act for the Amendment of an Act of the Session of the Twenty-third and Twenty-fourth Years of the Reign of Her present Majesty, Chapter One hundred and thirty-nine, intituled "An Act to amend the Law concerning the making, keeping, and Carriage of Gunpowder and Compositions of an explosive Nature, and concerning the Manufacture, Sale, and Use of Fireworks," (Note: Gunpowder Act 1860 (23 & 24 Vict. c. 139)) and of an Act (Note: Gunpowder and Fireworks Act 1861 (24 & 25 Vict. c. 130)) amending the last mentioned Act. (Repealed by Explosives Act 1875 (38 & 39 Vict. c. 17))
Bankruptcy Amendment Act 1862 or the Bankruptcy Act (1861) Amendment Act or the Bankruptcy Act 1862 (repealed)	25 & 26 Vict. c. 99	7 August 1862
An Act to amend the Bankruptcy Act (1861). (Note: Bankruptcy Act 1861 (24 & 25 Vict. c. 134)) (Repealed by Bankruptcy Repeal and Insolvent Court Act 1869 (32 & 33 Vict. c. 83) and County Courts Act 1888 (51 & 52 Vict. c. 43))
Burial Act 1862 (repealed)	25 & 26 Vict. c. 100	7 August 1862
An Act to authorize Improvement Commissioners acting as Burial Boards to mortgage certain Rates for the Purposes of the Burial Acts. (Repealed by Local Government Act 1933 (23 & 24 Geo. 5. c. 51))
General Police and Improvement (Scotland) Act 1862	25 & 26 Vict. c. 101	7 August 1862
An Act to make more effectual Provision for regulating the Police of Towns and populous Places in Scotland, and for lighting, cleansing, paving, draining, supplying Water to and improving the same, and also for promoting the Public Health thereof.
Metropolis Management Amendment Act 1862 (repealed)	25 & 26 Vict. c. 102	7 August 1862
An Act to amend the Metropolis Local Management Acts. (Repealed by Public Health (London) Act 1936 (26 Geo. 5 & 1 Edw. 8. c. 50) and Local Law (Greater London Council and Inner London Boroughs) Order 1965 (SI 1965/540))
Union Assessment Committee Act 1862 (repealed)	25 & 26 Vict. c. 103	7 August 1862
An Act to amend the Law relating to Parochial Assessments in England. (Repealed by Rating and Valuation Act 1925 (15 & 16 Geo. 5. c. 90) and Local Government Act 1948 (11 & 12 Geo. 6. c. 26))
Queen's Prison Discontinuance Act 1862 (repealed)	25 & 26 Vict. c. 104	7 August 1862
An Act for the Discontinuance of the Queen's Prison, and Removal of the Prisoners to Whitecross Street Prison. (Repealed by Statute Law Revision Act 1875 (38 & 39 Vict. c. 66) (Note: Incorrectly cited as "SL(R) 1975" in the Chronological Table of the Statutes.), Statute Law Revision Act 1893 (56 & 57 Vict. c. 14), Statute Law Revision Act 1894 (57 & 58 Vict. c. 56) and Statute Law Revision Act 1953 (2 & 3 Eliz. 2. c. 5))
Highland Roads and Bridges Act 1862 (repealed)	25 & 26 Vict. c. 105	7 August 1862
An Act to transfer the Roads and Bridges under the Management of the Commissioners of Highland Roads and Bridges to the several Counties in which the same are situate, and to provide for other Matters relating thereto. (Repealed by Local Government (Scotland) Act 1973 (c. 65))
County Surveyors (Ireland) Act 1862 (repealed)	25 & 26 Vict. c. 106	7 August 1862
An Act to amend the Law relating to the Appointment of County Surveyors in Ireland. (Repealed by Statute Law Revision Act 1875 (38 & 39 Vict. c. 66), Statute Law Revision Act 1893 (56 & 57 Vict. c. 14), Local Government (Ireland) Act 1898 (61 & 62 Vict. c. 37) and Statute Law Revision Act (Northern Ireland) 1954 (c. 35 (N.I.)))
Juries Act 1862 (repealed)	25 & 26 Vict. c. 107	7 August 1862
An Act to give greater Facilities for summoning Persons to serve on Juries, and for other Purposes relating thereto. (Repealed by Courts Act 1971 (c. 23))
Confirmation of Sales, etc., by Trustees Act 1862 (repealed)	25 & 26 Vict. c. 108	7 August 1862
An Act to confirm certain Sales, Exchanges, Partitions, and Enfranchisements by Trustees and others. (Repealed by Trustee Act 1893 (56 & 57 Vict. c. 53))
Corrupt Practices Act, 1854 Continuance Act 1862 (repealed)	25 & 26 Vict. c. 109	7 August 1862
An Act to continue the Corrupt Practices Prevention Act (1854). (Note: Corrupt Practices Prevention Act 1854 (17 & 18 Vict. c. 102)) (Repealed by Statute Law Revision Act 1875 (38 & 39 Vict. c. 66))
Union Relief Aid Act 1862 (repealed)	25 & 26 Vict. c. 110	7 August 1862
An Act to enable Boards of Guardians of certain Unions to obtain temporary Aid to meet the extraordinary Demands for Relief therein. (Repealed by Statute Law Revision Act 1875 (38 & 39 Vict. c. 66))
Lunacy Acts Amendment Act 1862 or the Lunacy Act Amendment Act 1862 (repealed)	25 & 26 Vict. c. 111	7 August 1862
An Act to amend the Law relating to Lunatics. (Repealed by Lunacy Act 1890 (53 & 54 Vict. c. 5))
Charitable Trusts Act 1862 (repealed)	25 & 26 Vict. c. 112	7 August 1862
An Act for establishing the Jurisdiction of the Charity Commissioners in certain Cases. (Repealed by Charities Act 1960 (8 & 9 Eliz. 2. c. 58))
Poor Removal Act 1862 (repealed)	25 & 26 Vict. c. 113	7 August 1862
An Act to amend the Law relating to the Removal of poor Persons from England to Scotland, and from Scotland to England and Ireland. (Repealed for England and Wales and Scotland by National Assistance Act 1948 (11 & 12 Geo. 6. c. 29) and for Northern Ireland by Statute Law Revision Act (Northern Ireland) 1954 (c. 35 (N.I.)))
Poaching Prevention Act 1862	25 & 26 Vict. c. 114	7 August 1862
An Act for the Prevention of Poaching.

=== Local acts ===
Short title	Citation	Royal assent
Long title
Great Northern Railway Amendment Act 1862	25 & 26 Vict. c. i	11 April 1862
Αn Act for enabling the Great Northern Railway Company to acquire additional Land near Doncaster, and extending the Time for the Sale of their superfluous Lands.
Woolwich, Plumstead and Charlton Consumers Gas Amendment Act 1862	25 & 26 Vict. c. ii	29 April 1862
An Act to enable the Woolwich, Plumstead, and Charlton Consumers Gas Company to raise a further Sum of Money.
Norwich Corporation Markets Act 1862 (repealed)	25 & 26 Vict. c. iii	16 May 1862
An Act to amend "The Norwich Corporation Markets Act, 1860," (Note: Norwich Corporation Markets Act 1860 (23 & 24 Vict. c. xxxiv)) and to authorize the Purchase of additional Lands; and for other Purposes. (Repealed by Norwich City Council Act 1984 (c. xxiii))
Ross Turnpike Roads Act 1862 (repealed)	25 & 26 Vict. c. iv	16 May 1862
An Act for continuing the Term and amending and extending the Provisions of the Act (Note: Ross (Hereford) Roads Act 1815 (55 Geo. 3. c. lxi)) relating to the Ross Turnpike Roads; and for other Purposes. (Repealed by Annual Turnpike Acts Continuance Act 1872 (35 & 36 Vict. c. 85))
Wycombe Railway Amendment Act 1862	25 & 26 Vict. c. v	16 May 1862
An Act to grant further Powers to the Wycombe Railway Company.
Folkestone to Barham Downs Turnpike Road Act 1862	25 & 26 Vict. c. vi	16 May 1862
An Act for extending the Term and amending the Provisions of the Acts relating to the Folkestone to Barham Downs Turnpike Road, in the County of Kent.
London and Blackwall Railway Act 1862	25 & 26 Vict. c. vii	16 May 1862
An Act to authorize the London and Blackwall Railway Company to construct additional Works and take additional Lands for enlarging their Railway, and to confer further Powers upon the Company with reference to the raising of Capital; and for other Purposes.
London, Tilbury and Southend Railway Act 1862	25 & 26 Vict. c. viii	16 May 1862
An Act to incorporate the Proprietors of Shares in the Undertaking called the London, Tilbury, and Southend Extension Railway, and to vest such Undertaking in the Company so incorporated; and for other Purposes.
Wareham Turnpike Roads Act 1862	25 & 26 Vict. c. ix	16 May 1862
An Act to repeal the Act (Note: Wareham and Purbeck Roads Act 1830 (11 Geo. 4 & 1 Will. 4. c. ci)) relating to the Wareham Turnpike Roads, and to make other Provisions in lieu thereof; and for other Purposes.
Faringdon Railway (Amendment) Act 1862	25 & 26 Vict. c. x	16 May 1862
An Act to enable the Faringdon Railway Company to create Preference Shares; and for other Purposes.
Coventry Poor Act 1862 (repealed)	25 & 26 Vict. c. xi	16 May 1862
An Act for making better Provision for the Relief of the Poor of the Parishes of Saint Michael and the Holy Trinity, Coventry. (Repealed by Local Government Board Provisional Order Confirmation (No. 3) Act 1873 (36 & 37 Vict. c. lxxxiii))
Winchester Road Act 1862	25 & 26 Vict. c. xii	16 May 1862
An Act for the Winchester Road in the County of Southampton.
Cirencester Roads Act 1862 (repealed)	25 & 26 Vict. c. xiii	16 May 1862
An Act to create a further Term in the Cirencester District of Turnpike Roads; to repeal, amend, and extend the Powers of the Act (Note: Cirencester Roads Act 1825 (6 Geo. 4. c. cxliii)) relating to the said Roads; and for other Purposes. (Repealed by Annual Turnpike Acts Continuance Act 1879 (42 & 43 Vict. c. 46))
Much Wenlock and Severn Junction Railway Act 1862	25 & 26 Vict. c. xiv	16 May 1862
An Act to authorize the Much Wenlock and Severn Junction Railway Company to raise further Sums of Money, and to subscribe an additional Sum to the Wenlock Railway; and for other Purposes.
Bridport (Second District) Turnpike Trust Act 1862 (repealed)	25 & 26 Vict. c. xv	16 May 1862
An Act for continuing the Term and amending and extending the Provisions of the Act (Note: Roads to and from Bridport Act 1830 (11 Geo. 4 & 1 Will. 4. c. v)) relating to the Second District of the Bridport Turnpike Roads in the County of Dorset, and to make other Provisions in lieu thereof. (Repealed by Annual Turnpike Acts Continuance Act 1881 (44 & 45 Vict. c. 31))
British Plate Glass Company Act 1862	25 & 26 Vict. c. xvi	16 May 1862
An Act to amend some of the Provisions of the Deed of Settlement of "The British Plate Glass Company," and to confirm a Lease granted by and to confer further Powers upon that Company.
Webb and Craig's Patent Act 1862	25 & 26 Vict. c. xvii	16 May 1862
An Act for rendering valid certain Letters Patent granted to Thomas Webb, of Tutbury in the County of Derby, Cotton Spinner, and James Craig, of the same Place, Manager.
Bradford Waterworks Act 1862 (repealed)	25 & 26 Vict. c. xviii	16 May 1862
An Act for the better supplying of the Borough of Bradford and Places near thereto with Water, and for authorizing the Mayor, Aldermen, and Burgesses of the Borough of Bradford, in order thereto, to raise further Monies; and for other Purposes. (Repealed by West Yorkshire Act 1980 (c. xiv))
Heckmondwike Gas Act 1862 (repealed)	25 & 26 Vict. c. xix	16 May 1862
An Act to incorporate the Heckmondwike Gas Company, with Powers to manufacture and supply Gas within the Townships of Heckmondwike and Liversedge in the Parish of Birstal in the West Riding of the County of York; and for other Purposes. (Repealed by West Yorkshire Act 1980 (c. xiv))
Queenstown Improvement Act 1862	25 & 26 Vict. c. xx	3 June 1862
An Act for transferring from the Grand Jury of the County of Cork to the Commissioners of Queenstown the Management of the Roads and Bridges in the said Town, and for improving the said Town.
Bristol and Exeter, and Chard and Taunton Railways Act 1862	25 & 26 Vict. c. xxi	3 June 1862
An Act to authorize the Bristol and Exeter Railway Company to subscribe a further Sum of Money to the Chard and Taunton Railway; and for other Purposes.
East London Waterworks Act 1862	25 & 26 Vict. c. xxii	3 June 1862
An Act for authorizing the East London Waterworks Company to raise further Monies, and for regulating their Capital and Borrowing Powers; and for other Purposes.
Limerick Markets Act 1862	25 & 26 Vict. c. xxiii	3 June 1862
An Act to enable the Limerick Market Trustees to borrow further Sums; and to amend "The Limerick Markets Act, 1852." (Note: Limerick Markets Act 1852 (15 & 16 Vict. c. civ))
North Devon Railway and Dock Act 1862	25 & 26 Vict. c. xxiv	3 June 1862
An Act to enable Her Majesty's Paymaster General to repay to the North Devon Railway and Dock Company a Sum of Three thousand Pounds.
Rathmines and Rathgar Improvement Act 1862	25 & 26 Vict. c. xxv	3 June 1862
An Act for extending the Improvement of the District of Rathmines so as to include therein Rathgar and Sallymount, all in the County of Dublin.
Tranmere Improvement Act 1862 (repealed)	25 & 26 Vict. c. xxvi	3 June 1862
An Act to enable the Local Board of the District of Tranmere in the County of Chester to make new Roads and Sewers; and for other Purposes. (Repealed by Birkenhead Corporation Act 1881 (44 & 45 Vict. c. cliii))
South Molton Markets and Improvement Act 1862	25 & 26 Vict. c. xxvii	3 June 1862
An Act for the building of a new Market House in the Borough of South Molton; for the regulating of Markets and Fairs in the Borough; for the Improvement in other respects of the Borough; and for other Purposes.
Leeds New Gas Company's Act 1862 (repealed)	25 & 26 Vict. c. xxviii	3 June 1862
An Act to enable "The Leeds New Gas Company" to raise additional Capital, to extend their Limits for supplying Gas, and for other Purposes. (Repealed by Leeds Corporation (Consolidation) Act 1905 (5 Edw. 7. c. i))
Brean Down Harbour Act 1862 (repealed)	25 & 26 Vict. c. xxix	3 June 1862
An Act for making a Pier and Harbour at Brean Down on the Bristol Channel, and for other Purposes. (Repealed by Brean Down Harbour and Railway Act 1889 (52 & 53 Vict. c. cciv))
Bristol Waterworks Act 1862	25 & 26 Vict. c. xxx	3 June 1862
An Act to repeal and consolidate the Acts relating to the Bristol Waterworks Company; to empower the Company to make fresh Works; and for other Purposes.
Berwick-upon-Tweed Harbour Act 1862	25 & 26 Vict. c. xxxi	3 June 1862
An Act for the Preservation and Improvement of the Pier and Harbour of Berwick-upon-Tweed.
Barnsley Local Board Act 1862	25 & 26 Vict. c. xxxii	3 June 1862
An Act for enabling the Local Board of Health for the District of the Township of Barnsley in the West Riding of the County of York to construct and maintain an improved System of Waterworks to supply the District and other Places with Water, and to abandon and sell their existing Waterworks; to confer Powers on Park Keepers and Constables; to amend the Acts relating to the District; and for other Purposes.
Falmouth Waterworks Act 1862	25 & 26 Vict. c. xxxiii	3 June 1862
An Act for granting further Powers for better supplying with Water the Town of Falmouth, and certain Places adjacent or near thereto.
Tendring Hundred Railway Act 1862	25 & 26 Vict. c. xxxiv	3 June 1862
An Act to authorize the Tendring Hundred Railway Company to extend their Railway in Colchester.
Dundee and Perth and Aberdeen Railway Junction Act 1862	25 & 26 Vict. c. xxxv	3 June 1862
An Act to authorize the Dundee and Perth and Aberdeen Railway Junction Company to raise further Money for the Purposes of their Undertaking and of the Dundee and Newtyle Railway, and to amend their Acts.
Uxbridge and Rickmansworth Railway Act 1862 (repealed)	25 & 26 Vict. c. xxxvi	3 June 1862
An Act to enable the Uxbridge and Rickmansworth Railway Company to make a Deviation of their authorized Line of Railway; and for other Purposes. (Repealed by Statute Law (Repeals) Act 2013 (c. 2))
Bollington Improvement and Lighting Act 1862	25 & 26 Vict. c. xxxvii	3 June 1862
An Act for the Improvement and Lighting of a Portion of the Township of Bollington in the Parish of Prestbury in the County Palatine of Chester.
Dublin Corporation Fire Act 1862	25 & 26 Vict. c. xxxviii	3 June 1862
An Act to extend and define the Powers of the Right Honourable the Lord Mayor, Aldermen, and Burgesses of Dublin in respect to the extinguishing of Fires, and the Protection of Life and Property against Fire; and for other Purposes.
Dublin and Meath Railway Act 1862	25 & 26 Vict. c. xxxix	3 June 1862
An Act to enable the Dublin and Meath Railway Company to raise additional Capital; and for other Purposes.
Frosterly and Stanhope Railway Act 1862	25 & 26 Vict. c. xl	3 June 1862
An Act to authorize a Deviation of Part of the authorized Line of the Frosterly and Stanhope Railway, to construct a new Branch and other Works, to abandon Portions of authorized Line and Approach to Stanhope, to raise additional Capital, amend and repeal Acts; and for other Purposes.
Halifax Improvement Act 1862	25 & 26 Vict. c. xli	3 June 1862
An Act for the further Improvement of the Borough of Halifax, and for other Purposes.
South Western Railway (Additional Powers) Act 1862	25 & 26 Vict. c. xlii	3 June 1862
An Act for authorizing the London and South-western Railway Company to make and maintain additional Works, and for authorizing the Transfer to them of the Wimbledon and Dorking Railway, and for making Arrangements respecting their Capital; and for other Purposes.
Dundee Waterworks Act 1862 (repealed)	25 & 26 Vict. c. xliii	3 June 1862
An Act to enable the Dundee Water Company to raise further Money, and to execute additional Works. (Repealed by Dundee Corporation (Water, Transport, Finance, &c.) Order Confirmation Act 1954 (2 & 3 Eliz. 2. c. ix))
Kent Waterworks Act 1862	25 & 26 Vict. c. xliv	3 June 1862
An Act for authorizing the Company of Proprietors of the Kent Waterworks to raise further Monies; and for regulating their Capital and Borrowing Powers.
Carlisle and Silloth Bay Railway and Dock Act 1862	25 & 26 Vict. c. xlv	3 June 1862
An Act to enable the Carlisle and Silloth Bay Railway and Dock Company to raise additional Capital by Preference Shares and otherwise, and for other Purposes.
Edgware, Highgate and London Railway Act 1862	25 & 26 Vict. c. xlvi	3 June 1862
An Act to authorize the Construction of a Railway in the County of Middlesex, from the Great Northern Railway, through Highgate, Finchley, and Hendon, to Edgware.
North British Railway, Silloth Railway and Dock (Lease) Act 1862	25 & 26 Vict. c. xlvii	3 June 1862
An Act to authorize a Lease of the Undertaking of the Carlisle and Silloth Bay Railway and Dock Company to the North British Railway Company; and for other Purposes.
North British Railway, Port Carlisle Railway and Dock (Lease) Act 1862	25 & 26 Vict. c. xlviii	3 June 1862
An Act to authorize a Lease of the Undertaking of the Port Carlisle Dock and Railway Company to the North British Railway Company; and for other Purposes.
North British Railway (Branches) Act 1862	25 & 26 Vict. c. xlix	3 June 1862
An Act to authorize the North British Railway Company to make certain Railways from their Main Line in the Parish of Inveresk to the Farm Steading of Smeaton, and thence to near Macmerry and to their Hawick Line at Hardengreen; and for other Purposes.
Asylum for the Deaf and Dumb Poor Act 1862	25 & 26 Vict. c. l	3 June 1862
An Act for incorporating the Members of the Institution known as "The Asylum for the Education of the Deaf and Dumb Children of the Poor," and for enabling them the better to carry on their charitable Designs.
Leadburn, Linton and Dolphinton Railway Act 1862	25 & 26 Vict. c. li	3 June 1862
An Act for making a Railway from the Peebles Railway at the Leadburn Station to the Parish of Linton in the County of Peebles.
Leeds Waterworks Act 1862 (repealed)	25 & 26 Vict. c. lii	3 June 1862
An Act for a further Supply of Water to the Town and Neighbourhood of Leeds from the River Wharfe, and for other Purposes. (Repealed by Leeds Corporation (Consolidation) Act 1905 (5 Edw. 7. c. i))
Edinburgh Roads and Streets Act 1862	25 & 26 Vict. c. liii	3 June 1862
An Act to consolidate and amend the Acts relating to the Maintenance and Repair of the Roads, Streets, and Bridges within the District of the City of Edinburgh, and the Assessments payable in respect thereof; and for other Purposes.
Stockton and Darlington Railway (Tow Law and Crook) Act 1862	25 & 26 Vict. c. liv	3 June 1862
An Act for authorizing the Stockton and Darlington Railway Company to make and maintain new Lines of Railway and other Works in the County of Durham; and for other Purposes.
Daventry Railway Act 1862	25 & 26 Vict. c. lv	30 June 1862
An Act to authorize the making of a Railway from Daventry in the County of Northampton, to the London and North-western Railway near Weedon in the same County, and for other Purposes.
Tewkesbury and Malvern Railway Act 1862	25 & 26 Vict. c. lvi	30 June 1862
An Act to confer upon the Tewkesbury and Malvern Railway Company further Powers for the Completion of their Railway; and for other Purposes.
London Railway Depôt and Storehouses Act 1862	25 & 26 Vict. c. lvii	30 June 1862
An Act to authorize the Relinquishment of the Street and Railway authorized by "The London Railway Depôt and Storehouses Act, 1860," (Note: London Railway Depôt and Storehouses Act 1860 (23 & 24 Vict. c. cxcvii)) and for other Purposes.
Metropolitan Railway Act 1862	25 & 26 Vict. c. lviii	30 June 1862
An Act to authorize the Metropolitan Railway Company to acquire certain additional Lands and execute further Works for the Purposes of their Undertaking; to confer further Powers upon the Company with reference to the raising of Capital; to authorize further Agreements with other Companies; and for other Purposes.
New Chappel, Lindfield and Brighton Road Act 1862	25 & 26 Vict. c. lix	30 June 1862
An Act to repeal the Act (Note: Road from New Chappel to Brighton Act 1830 (11 Geo. 4 & 1 Will. 4. c. xviii)) relating to the New Chappel, Lindfield, and Brighton, and Ditcheling and Clayton Roads, and to make other Provisions in lieu thereof.
Denbigh, Ruthin and Corwen Railway Act 1862	25 & 26 Vict. c. lx	30 June 1862
An Act to enable the Denbigh Ruthin and Corwen Railway Company to create Preference Capital.
Shard Bridge Act 1862	25 & 26 Vict. c. lxi	30 June 1862
An Act for the making and maintaining of a Bridge over the River Wyre (to be called "Shard Bridge"), with Roads thereto, and for other Purposes.
Great North of Scotland Railway Amendment Act 1862	25 & 26 Vict. c. lxii	30 June 1862
An Act for granting further Powers to the Great North of Scotland Railway Company.
Bradford, Wakefield and Leeds Railway Amendment Act 1862	25 & 26 Vict. c. lxiii	30 June 1862
An Act to amend the Bradford, Wakefield, and Leeds Railway Act, 1860, (Note: Bradford, Wakefield and Leeds Railway Act 1860 (23 & 24 Vict. c. clxvii)) and to make further Provision as to Purchase of Land and Completion of Works on Ossett Branch.
Scottish North Eastern Railway Amendment Act 1862	25 & 26 Vict. c. lxiv	30 June 1862
An Act to enable the Scottish North-eastern Railway Company to raise additional Capital, to make a Deviation in their Railway, and execute other Works, and purchase additional Lands; to amend the Acts relating to the Company; and for other Purposes.
Bolton and Blackburn Road Act 1862 (repealed)	25 & 26 Vict. c. lxv	30 June 1862
An Act for repairing and maintaining the Road from the Borough of Bolton to the Borough of Blackburn, and a Branch Road connected therewith, in the County Palatine of Lancaster. (Repealed by Annual Turnpike Acts Continuance Act 1877 (40 & 41 Vict. c. 64))
Cromford and High Peak Railway (Lease) Act 1862	25 & 26 Vict. c. lxvi	30 June 1862
An Act to authorize the Lease of the Cromford and High Peak Railway to the London and North-western Railway Company, and to make certain Arrangements with reference to the Capital of the Cromford and High Peak Railway Company; and for other Purposes.
Kington and Eardisley Railway Act 1862	25 & 26 Vict. c. lxvii	30 June 1862
An Act for the Incorporation of a Company for making a Railway from Kington to Eardisley, with a Branch therefrom; and for vesting in such Company a Tramroad called "the Kington Railway," and enabling them to appropriate Portions of such Tramroad for the Purposes of their Undertaking; and for other Purposes.
London, Brighton and South Coast Railway (Stations, &c.) Act 1862	25 & 26 Vict. c. lxviii	30 June 1862
An Act to enable the London, Brighton, and South Coast Railway Company to enlarge their Stations at London Bridge and the Bricklayers Arms, and to alter certain Roads, Streets, and Bridges; and for other Purposes.
Lostwithiel and Fowey Railway Act 1862	25 & 26 Vict. c. lxix	30 June 1862
An Act for making a Railway from the Cornwall Railway near Lostwithiel to Fowey in the County of Cornwall, and for other Purposes.
St. Giles in the Fields Glebe Act 1862	25 & 26 Vict. c. lxx	30 June 1862
An Act for vesting the disused Burial Ground of the Parish of Saint Giles in the Fields, and other Lands connected therewith, in the Rector as Glebe, and providing for the Maintenance of the disused Burial Ground; and for other Purposes.
Weymouth and Portland Railway Act 1862	25 & 26 Vict. c. lxxi	30 June 1862
An Act to authorize the Construction of a Railway from Weymouth, to the Isle of Portland, and to extend the Wilts, Somerset, and Weymouth Railway to the Harbour.
Stretford Gas Act 1862	25 & 26 Vict. c. lxxii	30 June 1862
An Act for supplying with Gas the Township of Stretford and adjacent Places in the County of Lancaster, and the Township of Sale and adjacent Places in the County of Chester; and for other Purposes.
Windermere District Gas Act 1862	25 & 26 Vict. c. lxxiii	30 June 1862
An Act for supplying with Gas the Townships of Undermillbeck, Applethwaite, and Troutbeck, in the Parish of Windermere in the County of Westmoreland.
Great Britain Mutual Life Assurance Society Act 1862	25 & 26 Vict. c. lxxiv	30 June 1862
An Act to enable the Great Britain Mutual Life Assurance Society to sue and be sued; and to confer further Powers on the Society.
Newry and Armagh Railway Amendment Act 1862	25 & 26 Vict. c. lxxv	30 June 1862
An Act to confer further Powers on the Newry and Armagh Railway Company.
Tyne General Ferry Act 1862	25 & 26 Vict. c. lxxvi	30 June 1862
An Act for incorporating the Tyne General Ferry Company, and for authorizing them to establish, make, and maintain Ferries on, along, and across the River Tyne, and Landing Places and other Works; and for other Purposes.
Hull South Bridge Act 1862	25 & 26 Vict. c. lxxvii	30 June 1862
An Act for erecting a Bridge across the River Hull or Old Harbour, with Approaches and other Works connected therewith, all in the Town and County of the Town of Kingston-upon-Hull.
London, Brighton and South Coast Railway (New Lines) Act 1862	25 & 26 Vict. c. lxxviii	30 June 1862
An Act to authorize the London, Brighton, and South Coast Railway Company to make certain new Lines of Railway in the Counties of Surrey and Sussex; and for other Purposes.
Scottish Northern Junction Railway Act 1862	25 & 26 Vict. c. lxxix	30 June 1862
An Act for making a Railway from the Scottish North-eastern Railway near Limpet Mill to the Great North of Scotland Railway at Kintore, with Branches to the Deeside Railway at Peterculter; and for other Purposes.
Maryport and Carlisle Railway Act 1862	25 & 26 Vict. c. lxxx	30 June 1862
An Act to enable the Maryport and Carlisle Railway Company to construct Branch Railways to Bolton and Wigton, to improve their Station Accommodation at Wigton, to purchase additional Lands at Wigton and Aikbank, to raise further Monies; and for other Purposes.
Midland Railway (Additional Powers) Act 1862	25 & 26 Vict. c. lxxxi	30 June 1862
An Act for enabling the Midland Railway Company to construct new Railways and Works, and to acquire additional Lands in the Counties of Derby, Leicester, Warwick, Bedford, Worcester, Gloucester, and Middlesex; and for other Purposes.
Ventnor Harbour Act 1862	25 & 26 Vict. c. lxxxii	30 June 1862
An Act for making and maintaining a Harbour, Piers, and other Works at Ventnor in the Isle of Wight, and for other Purposes.
Caterham Spring Water Company's Act 1862	25 & 26 Vict. c. lxxxiii	30 June 1862
An Act for incorporating a Company, under the Title of "The Caterham Spring Water Company," for better supplying with Water the Inhabitants of Caterham and the Neighbourhood thereof.
Reading Gas Act 1862	25 & 26 Vict. c. lxxxiv	30 June 1862
An Act for the Amalgamation of the Reading Union Gas Company and the Reading Gaslight Company; and for incorporating the Reading Gas Company; and for making further Provision for the supplying of the Borough of Reading and the Neighbourhood thereof with Gas; and for other Purposes.
North-eastern Railway Company's (Beverley Branch) Act 1862 or the North Eastern Railway (Beverley Branch) Act 1862	25 & 26 Vict. c. lxxxv	30 June 1862
An Act to enable the North-eastern Railway Company to construct Branch Railways from Market Weighton to Beverley and at Hull, to raise additional Capital; and for other Purposes.
Hatfield and Saint Albans Railway Act 1862 or the Hatfield and St. Albans Railway Act 1862	25 & 26 Vict. c. lxxxvi	30 June 1862
An Act for making a Railway from the Great Northern Railway at Hatfield to the London and North-western Railway at Saint Albans; and for other Purposes.
Alford Valley Railway Amendment Act 1862	25 & 26 Vict. c. lxxxvii	30 June 1862
An Act for granting further Powers to the Alford Valley Railway Company.
Deeside Railway Act 1862	25 & 26 Vict. c. lxxxviii	30 June 1862
An Act to enable the Deeside Railway Company to raise additional Capital for their original Railway; to maintain certain Portions of their Extension Railway constructed beyond the authorized Limits; and for other Purposes.
Furness Railway Act 1862	25 & 26 Vict. c. lxxxix	30 June 1862
An Act to enable the Furness Railway Company to make a Branch Railway to Hawcoat Quarry; to vest in the said Company the Undertaking of the Ulverstone Canal Navigation; and to enable them to raise additional Capital; and for other Purposes.
Keighley and Worth Valley Railway Act 1862	25 & 26 Vict. c. xc	30 June 1862
An Act for making a Railway in the West Riding of the County of York, to be called "The Keighley and Worth Valley Railway;" and for other Purposes.
Midland Railway (Rowsley and Buxton Extension) Act 1862	25 & 26 Vict. c. xci	30 June 1862
An Act for the Construction by the Midland Railway Company of new Railways in connexion with their Rowsley and Buxton Line, and for the Abandonment of Part of the authorized Manchester, Sheffield, and Lincolnshire Railway; for authorizing the Use by the Manchester, Sheffield, and Lincolnshire Railway Company of Parts of the intended Railways; and for other Purposes.
Leeds, Bradford and Halifax Junction Railway Act 1862	25 & 26 Vict. c. xcii	30 June 1862
An Act to authorize the Leeds, Bradford and Halifax Junction Railway Company to deviate and extend the authorized Line of their Batley Branch Railway in the West Riding of the County of York; and for other Purposes.
Vale of Clwyd Railway Act 1862	25 & 26 Vict. c. xciii	30 June 1862
An Act to enable the Vale of Clwyd Railway Company to extend their Railway to the North-west Shore of the River Clwyd at Foryd; to divert a Portion of the Line of their present Railway; and for other Purposes.
Burton-upon-Trent Railways Act 1862	25 & 26 Vict. c. xciv	30 June 1862
An Act to authorize the Construction of Railways within the Town of Burton-upon-Trent, and for other Purposes.
Hereford, Hay and Brecon Railway Act 1862	25 & 26 Vict. c. xcv	30 June 1862
An Act to enable the Hereford, Hay, and Brecon Railway Company to make and maintain Deviations in the Line and Levels of their Railway; and for other Purposes.
South Eastern Railway (Tonbridge and Dartford Lines, &c.) Act 1862	25 & 26 Vict. c. xcvi	30 June 1862
An Act to enable the South-eastern Railway Company to make Railways to Tunbridge and Dartford respectively, and to widen a Portion of their North Kent Line of Railway, and to purchase additional Lands for the Purposes of their Undertaking; and for other Purposes.
Lancashire and Yorkshire Railway (Additional Powers) Act 1862	25 & 26 Vict. c. xcvii	30 June 1862
An Act to enable the Lancashire and Yorkshire Railway Company to construct a Branch Railway to Shawforth and other Works; to purchase additional Lands; and for other Purposes.
Oldham, Ashton and Guide Bridge Junction Railway Leasing Act 1862	25 & 26 Vict. c. xcviii	30 June 1862
An Act for vesting the Oldham, Ashton-under-Lyne, and Guide Bridge Junction Railway in the Manchester, Sheffield, and Lincolnshire, and the London and North-western Railway Companies and; for other Purposes.
Wakefield Waterworks Act 1862 (repealed)	25 & 26 Vict. c. xcix	30 June 1862
An Act to make better Provision for supplying with Water the Town and Township of Wakefield, and the Townships of Alverthorpe-with-Thornes, Stanley-cum-Wrenthorpe, and Sandal Magna, and for other Purposes. (Repealed by West Yorkshire Act 1980 (c. xiv))
Hull and Hornsea Railway Act 1862	25 & 26 Vict. c. c	30 June 1862
An Act for making a Railway from Kingston-upon-Hull to Hornsea.
Ceylon Railway Company's Dissolution Act 1862 (repealed)	25 & 26 Vict. c. ci	30 June 1862
An Act for dissolving the Ceylon Railway Company, and for other Purposes connected therewith. (Repealed by Statute Law (Repeals) Act 2013 (c. 2))
North British and Mercantile Insurance Company's Act 1862 (repealed)	25 & 26 Vict. c. cii	30 June 1862
An Act for authorizing "The North British Insurance Company" to increase their Capital Stock; and for other Purposes. (Repealed by North British and Mercantile Insurance Company's Act 1920 (10 & 11 Geo. 5. c. cxxxii))
Ashbourne and Belper Turnpike Trust Act 1862	25 & 26 Vict. c. ciii	30 June 1862
An Act to continue the Ashborne and Belper Turnpike Trust in the County of Derby; and for other Purposes.
London and North Western Railway (Capital) Act 1862	25 & 26 Vict. c. civ	30 June 1862
An Act to define the Powers of the London and North-western and Chester and Holyhead Railway Companies for raising Money; and for other Purposes.
Red House and Weeland Roads Act 1862 (repealed)	25 & 26 Vict. c. cv	30 June 1862
An Act for the Red House and Weeland Roads in the West Riding of the County of York. (Repealed by Annual Turnpike Acts Continuance Act 1878 (41 & 42 Vict. c. 62))
Stockton and Darlington Railway (Amalgamation) Act 1862	25 & 26 Vict. c. cvi	30 June 1862
An Act for the Amalgamation of the South Durham and Lancashire Union and Eden Valley Railway Companies with the Stockton and Darlington Railway Company; for the Transfer to the last-named Company of the Frosterly and Stanhope Railway; and for other Purposes.
Liverpool Corporation Waterworks Act 1862 (repealed)	25 & 26 Vict. c. cvii	30 June 1862
An Act to empower the Mayor, Aldermen, and Burgesses of the Borough of Liverpool to construct additional Reservoirs and other Works; to alter the Charges for the Supply of Water within the Limits of their District, and to make other Rates and Charges in respect of such Supply; and for other Purposes. (Repealed by Liverpool Corporation Act 1921 (11 & 12 Geo. 5. c. lxxiv))
Banbridge, Lisburn and Belfast Railway (Leasing) Act 1862	25 & 26 Vict. c. cviii	30 June 1862
An Act to provide for the leasing of the Banbridge, Lisburn, and Belfast Railway to the Ulster Railway Company.
Bala and Dolgelly Railway Act 1862	25 & 26 Vict. c. cix	30 June 1862
An Act to authorize the Construction of a Railway from Bala to Dolgelly in the County of Merioneth; and for other Purposes.
Corwen and Bala Railway Act 1862	25 & 26 Vict. c. cx	30 June 1862
An Act for making a Railway from Corwen to Bala, and for other Purposes.
Launceston and South Devon Railway Act 1862	25 & 26 Vict. c. cxi	30 June 1862
An Act for incorporating a Company for making a Railway in the Counties of Devon and Cornwall, to be called "The Launceston and South Devon Railway;" and for other Purposes.
Manchester, Sheffield and Lincolnshire Railway Act 1862	25 & 26 Vict. c. cxii	30 June 1862
An Act to enable the Manchester, Sheffield, and Lincolnshire Railway Company to make a new Railway in the County of Chester, to be called "The Manchester, Sheffield, and Lincolnshire (Godley and Woodley Branch) Railway;" and for other Purposes.
Inverness and Aberdeen Junction Railway Act 1862 (repealed)	25 & 26 Vict. c. cxiii	30 June 1862
An Act to authorize the Consolidation into One Undertaking of the Inverness and Ross-shire and Inverness and Aberdeen Junction Railways, and the Union into One Company of the Two Companies to which the said Railways respectively belong. (Repealed by Highland Railway Act 1865 (28 & 29 Vict. c. clxviii))
Enniskillen, Bundoran and Sligo Railway Act 1862	25 & 26 Vict. c. cxiv	30 June 1862
An Act to authorize the Enniskillen and Bundoran Railway Company to extend their Railway to the Midland Great Western Railway of Ireland at Sligo; to change the Name of the Company; and for other Purposes.
Llyni Valley Railway Act 1862	25 & 26 Vict. c. cxv	30 June 1862
An Act to enable the Llynvi Valley Railway Company to increase their Capital, and for other Purposes.
Wilford Bridge Act 1862 (repealed)	25 & 26 Vict. c. cxvi	30 June 1862
An Act for the making and maintaining of a Bridge over the River Trent near to the Town of Nottingham (to be called "Wilford Bridge"), with Roads thereto, and for the discontinuing of Wilford Ferry across the River, and for other Purposes. (Repealed by Nottinghamshire County Council Act 1985 (c. xv))
Leeds and Birstal Road Act 1862	25 & 26 Vict. c. cxvii	7 July 1862
An Act to repeal an Act passed in the First Year of the Reign of His Majesty King William the Fourth, intituled "An Act for amending and maintaining the Turnpike Road from and out of the Road leading from Quebec in Leeds to Homefield Lane End in Wortley, to communicate with the Road leading from Huddersfield to Birstal, at the "Coach and Horses" Public House in Birstal in the West Riding of the County of York," (Note: Road from Leeds to Wortley Act 1831 (1 Will. 4. c. xxix)) and granting more effectual Powers in lieu thereof.
Eden Valley Railway Act 1862	25 & 26 Vict. c. cxviii	7 July 1862
An Act to enable the Eden Valley Railway Company to construct certain Extension and Branch Railways to use Portions of other Railways to raise additional Capital and for other Purposes.
Rotherham and Wortley Road Act 1862	25 & 26 Vict. c. cxix	7 July 1862
An Act for the Rotherham and Wortley Turnpike Road in the West Riding of the County of York.
North-eastern Railway Company's (Hull and Holderness Amalgamation) Act 1862 or the North Eastern Railway (Hull and Holderness Amalgamation) Act 1862	25 & 26 Vict. c. cxx	7 July 1862
An Act for dissolving the Hull and Holderness Railway Company, and vesting its Undertaking in and uniting its Shareholders with those of the North-eastern Railway Company; and for other Purposes.
Bridge of Weir Railway Act 1862	25 & 26 Vict. c. cxxi	7 July 1862
An Act for making a Railway from Johnstone to Bridge of Weir in the County of Renfrew, with Branches, and for other Purposes.
Wexford Harbour Commissioners Act 1862	25 & 26 Vict. c. cxxii	7 July 1862
An Act to dissolve the present Body of the Wexford Harbour Commissioners, and to appoint new Commissioners, and for other Purposes.
Cardiff Borough Act 1862 (repealed)	25 & 26 Vict. c. cxxiii	7 July 1862
An Act for conferring further Powers for the good Government of the Borough of Cardiff; and for other Purposes. (Repealed by County of South Glamorgan Act 1976 (c. xxxv))
Garston and Liverpool Railway Amendment Act 1862	25 & 26 Vict. c. cxxiv	7 July 1862
An Act to authorize the Abandonment of a Portion of the Garston and Liverpool Railway; and for other Purposes.
Water Supply to Kent County Gaol and Lunatic Asylum Act 1862	25 & 26 Vict. c. cxxv	7 July 1862
An Act for better supplying with Water the Gaol and House of Correction at Maidstone in and for the County of Kent, and the Lunatic Asylum at Barming Heath in and for the said County; and for other Purposes.
Liverpool Fire Prevention Acts Amendment Act 1862 (repealed)	25 & 26 Vict. c. cxxvi	7 July 1862
An Act to amend the Acts now in force for the Protection of Property in the Borough of Liverpool from Fire. (Repealed by Liverpool Corporation Act 1921 (11 & 12 Geo. 5. c. lxxiv))
Great Western Railway (Additional Powers) Act 1862	25 & 26 Vict. c. cxxvii	7 July 1862
An Act for enabling the Great-western Railway Company to construct Railways, and to acquire additional Lands in the Counties of Stafford and Warwick; and for other Purposes.
Moretonhampstead and South Devon Railway Act 1862	25 & 26 Vict. c. cxxviii	7 July 1862
An Act for incorporating a Company for making a Railway in the County of Devon, to be called "The Moretonhampstead and South Devon Railway;" and for other Purposes.
Trent, Ancholme and Grimsby Railway Act 1862	25 & 26 Vict. c. cxxix	7 July 1862
An Act to authorize the South Yorkshire Railway and River Dun Company, and the Manchester, Sheffield, and Lincolnshire Railway Company to contribute Funds towards and to acquire the Undertaking of the Trent, Alcholme, and Grimsby Railway Company.
Wem and Bronygarth Roads Act 1862	25 & 26 Vict. c. cxxx	7 July 1862
An Act to amend "The Wem and Bronygarth Roads Act, 1860," (Note: Wem and Bronygarth Roads Act 1860 (23 & 24 Vict. c. viii)) and to confer further Powers in relation to the said Roads.
United Kingdom Electric Telegraph Act 1862	25 & 26 Vict. c. cxxxi	7 July 1862
An Act to enable the United Kingdom Electric Telegraph Company (Limited) to carry on the Works and Business of an Electric Telegraph Company.
Dartmouth and Torbay Railway Act 1862	25 & 26 Vict. c. cxxxii	7 July 1862
An Act for extending the Period limited for the Completion of a Portion of the Railway of the Dartmouth and Torbay Railway Company, and for authorizing them to raise a further Sum of Money; and for other Purposes.
Furness and Coniston Railways Amalgamation Act 1862	25 & 26 Vict. c. cxxxiii	7 July 1862
An Act to authorize the Amalgamation of the Coniston Railway Company with the Furness Railway Company, and for other Purposes.
Sheffield and Chapel-en-le-Frith Roads Act 1862	25 & 26 Vict. c. cxxxiv	7 July 1862
An Act to repeal the Act (Note: Sheffield and Chapel-en-le-Frith Roads Act 1825 (6 Geo. 4. c. cxliv)) "for repealing Two Acts (Note: Yorkshire and Derby Roads Act 1795 (35 Geo. 3. c. 164)) (Note: Roads from Little Sheffield Sparrow Pit Gate Act 1811 (51 Geo. 3. c. lxxv)) for repairing the Road from Little Sheffield in the County of York to Sparrow Pit Gate in the County of Derby, and also an Act (Note: Banner Cross and Fox House Turnpike Road and Branch Act 1812 (52 Geo. 3. c. cxvi)) for making a Road from Banner Cross in the West Riding of the County of York to Fox House in the County of Derby, and for consolidating the Trusts of certain Roads mentioned in the said Acts, and for amending and making certain other Roads to communicate therewith, and for other Purposes;" and to make other Provisions in lieu thereof.
Edinburgh and Glasgow and Dumbartonshire Railways Amalgamation Act 1862	25 & 26 Vict. c. cxxxv	7 July 1862
An Act to amalgamate the Caledonian and Dumbartonshire Junction Railway Company with the Edinburgh and Glasgow Railway Company.
Caledonian Railway (Cleland Extension and Branches Deviation, &c.) Act 1862	25 & 26 Vict. c. cxxxvi	7 July 1862
An Act to enable the Caledonian Railway Company to make certain Deviations of their authorized Lines of Railway called the "Cleland Branch Extension" and the "Omoa Branch," in the County of Lanark; and for other Purposes.
Caledonian Railway (Leith Branches) Act 1862	25 & 26 Vict. c. cxxxvii	7 July 1862
An Act to enable the Caledonian Railway Company to make a Branch Railway from their Granton Branch to Leith, with a connecting Branch therefrom; and for other Purposes.
Edinburgh and Glasgow and Helensburgh Railways Amalgamation Act 1862	25 & 26 Vict. c. cxxxviii	7 July 1862
An Act to amalgamate the Glasgow, Dumbarton, and Helensburgh Railway Company with the Edinburgh and Glasgow Railway Company.
Irish North-western Railway Act 1862	25 & 26 Vict. c. cxxxix	7 July 1862
An Act for changing the Name of the Dundalk and Enniskillen Railway Company to the Name "The Irish North-western Railway Company;" and for authorizing them to make and maintain an additional Line of Railway and other Works; and to make Arrangements with other Companies and Public Bodies; and to raise further Monies; and for other Purposes.
Level of Hatfield Chase Act 1862	25 & 26 Vict. c. cxl	7 July 1862
An Act to incorporate the Participants of the Level of Hatfield Chase; to authorize the Construction of additional Works of Drainage in the said Level; and to subject certain Lands therein to Taxation.
South Yorkshire Railway (Sheffield and Thorne) Act 1862	25 & 26 Vict. c. cxli	17 July 1862
An Act to enable the South Yorkshire Railway and River Dun Company to make Railways near Sheffield and Thorne, and to exercise other Powers.
Berwickshire Railway Act 1862	25 & 26 Vict. c. cxlii	17 July 1862
An Act for making a Railway from the Hawick Branch of the North British Railway near Newtown Saint Boswells to Dunse.
Bishops Waltham Railway Act 1862	25 & 26 Vict. c. cxliii	17 July 1862
An Act for making a Railway from Bishops Waltham to Botley.
Crystal Palace and South London Junction Railway Act 1862	25 & 26 Vict. c. cxliv	17 July 1862
An Act for effecting Railway Communication from the Metropolitan Extension of the London, Chatham, and Dover Railway to the Crystal Palace at Sydenham.
North-eastern and Carlisle Railways Amalgamation Act 1862 or the North Eastern and Carlisle Railways Amalgamation Act 1862	25 & 26 Vict. c. cxlv	17 July 1862
An Act for the Amalgamation of the Undertaking of the Newcastle-upon-Tyne and Carlisle Railway Company with the Undertaking of the North-eastern Railway Company; and for other Purposes.
North-eastern Railway Company's (Conside Branch) Act 1862 or the North Eastern Railway (Conside Branch) Act 1862	25 & 26 Vict. c. cxlvi	17 July 1862
An Act to enable the North-eastern Railway Company to construct a Branch Railway between Blaydon and Conside, with Branches therefrom; to acquire additional Lands, and for other Purposes.
Tupton and Ashover Road and Birkin Lane Road Act 1862	25 & 26 Vict. c. cxlvii	17 July 1862
An Act for more effectually repairing certain Roads called "The Tupton and Ashover Road," and "The Birkin Lane Road," in the County of Derby.
Birkenhead Railway Act 1862	25 & 26 Vict. c. cxlviii	17 July 1862
An Act to authorize the Construction of a Railway from Hooton to Parkgate, in connexion with the existing Birkenhead Railway, and for other Purposes.
Bristol and South Wales Union Railway Act 1862	25 & 26 Vict. c. cxlix	17 July 1862
An Act to enable the Bristol and South Wales Union Railway Company to construct a Branch Railway to communicate with a Pier and other Works at the Mouth of the River Avon; and to authorize certain Arrangements with the Mayor, Aldermen, and Burgesses of the City and County of Bristol with reference thereto.
Cheadle Turnpike Roads Act 1862 (repealed)	25 & 26 Vict. c. cl	17 July 1862
An Act to repeal an Act of the First Year of the Reign of King William the Fourth, (Note: Roads in the Neighbourhood of Cheadle Act 1831 (1 Will. 4. c. lxviii)) "for consolidating the Trusts of the several Turnpike Roads in the Neighbourhood of Cheadle, in the County of Stafford, and for making Deviations and new Branches to and from the same;" and to make other Provisions in lieu thereof. (Repealed by Annual Turnpike Acts Continuance Act 1878 (41 & 42 Vict. c. 62))
Horsham, Dorking, and Leatherhead Railway Act 1862	25 & 26 Vict. c. cli	17 July 1862
An Act for making a Railway from Horsham to Dorking, and for other Purposes.
Thames Valley Railway Act 1862	25 & 26 Vict. c. clii	17 July 1862
An Act for making Railways from the London and South-western Railway to Hampton and Shepperton in the County of Middlesex.
Mid Kent (Addiscombe) Railway Act 1862	25 & 26 Vict. c. cliii	17 July 1862
An Act to authorize the Mid Kent Railway Company to make a Railway from the Mid Kent Railway to Addiscombe; and for other Purposes.
North-eastern Railway Company's (Team Valley Extension) Act 1862 or the North Eastern Railway (Team Valley Extension) Act 1862	25 & 26 Vict. c. cliv	17 July 1862
An Act to enable the North-eastern Railway Company to construct the Team Valley and other Branch Railways in the County of Durham; and for other Purposes.
Dublin Cattle Market Act 1862	25 & 26 Vict. c. clv	17 July 1862
An Act for providing and constructing an improved Cattle Market, Market Places, and Slaughterhouses, with all necessary Approaches and Conveniences, within the Parish of Saint Thomas in the County of the City of Dublin.
Mid Wales Railway (Deviations, &c.) Act 1862	25 & 26 Vict. c. clvi	17 July 1862
An Act to enable the Mid Wales Railway Company to alter the Line and Levels of their Railway, and to make a Junction between the Mid Wales and the Central Wales (Extension) Railways; and to amend the Acts relating to the said Company; and for other Purposes.
Glasgow Barony Parochial Board Act 1862 (repealed)	25 & 26 Vict. c. clvii	17 July 1862
An Act to alter the Constitution of the Parochial Board of the Barony Parish of Glasgow in the County of Lanark. (Repealed by Local Government (Scotland) Act 1894 (57 & 58 Vict. c. 58))
Banstead and Epsom Downs Railway Act 1862	25 & 26 Vict. c. clviii	17 July 1862
An Act for making a Railway from the Sutton Station of the Croydon and Epsom Branch of the London, Brighton, and South Coast Railway to Banstead and Epsom Downs in the County of Surrey.
Bristol Port, Railway and Pier Act 1862	25 & 26 Vict. c. clix	17 July 1862
An Act for making a Railway from the Port of Bristol to the Old Channel at the Mouth of the River Avon, together with a Pier in the said River, and for other Purposes.
Greenock and Wemyss Bay Railway Act 1862	25 & 26 Vict. c. clx	17 July 1862
An Act for making a Railway from the Glasgow, Paisley, and Greenock Railway to Wemyss Bay in the County of Renfrew, and a Pier and Roads in connexion therewith; and for other Purposes.
Llanelly Railway and Dock Act 1862	25 & 26 Vict. c. clxi	17 July 1862
An Act for authorizing the Llanelly Railway and Dock Company to make and maintain new Lines of Railway by way of Deviation of their authorized Swansea Lines and Carmarthen Line and other Works, and to make Arrangements with other Companies, and to raise further Capital, and to make Provision for laying down Narrow Gauge Rails on the Carmarthen and Cardigan Railway; and for other Purposes.
Llanidloes and Newtown (Mid Wales and Manchester and Milford) Railway Act 1862	25 & 26 Vict. c. clxii	17 July 1862
An Act for authorizing the Llanidloes and Newtown Railway Company to make and maintain a Line of Railway for the joint Use of the Mid Wales Railway Company and the Manchester and Milford Railway Company, and a Station at Llanidloes for the joint Use of the Three Companies, and to raise further Monies; and for other Purposes.
London, Chatham and Dover Railway (Deal Extension) Act 1862 (repealed)	25 & 26 Vict. c. clxiii	17 July 1862
An Act to authorize the Extension of the London, Chatham, and Dover Railway to Walmer and Deal, and for other Purposes. (Repealed by Deal and Dover Railway Act 1865 (28 & 29 Vict. c. ccxcvi))
Nene Valley Act 1862 or the Nene Valley Drainage and Navigation Act 1862	25 & 26 Vict. c. clxiv	17 July 1862
An Act to amend the Acts relating to the Nene Valley Drainage and Navigation Improvement; and to make Provision for the Discharge of the Debts and Liabilities of the Commissioners in the Third District of Drainage, and for the Separation of the Districts; and for other Purposes.
Okehampton Railway Act 1862	25 & 26 Vict. c. clxv	17 July 1862
An Act for making a Railway from the North Devon Railway in the Parish of Colebrook in the County of Devon to Okehampton in the same County; and for other Purposes,
Sevenoaks, Maidstone and Tonbridge Railway Act 1862	25 & 26 Vict. c. clxvi	17 July 1862
An Act for authorizing the Construction of Railways from the Sevenoaks Railway to Maidstone and Tunbridge, and to join existing Railways at Tunbridge, all in Kent; and for other Purposes.
Swansea Harbour Act 1862	25 & 26 Vict. c. clxvii	17 July 1862
An Act to enable the Swansea Harbour Trustees to raise a further Sum of Money for the Purposes of their Undertaking; and to authorize a Lease or Leases of the Swansea Harbour Railway and certain Wharves in Swansea Harbour to the Vale of Neath Railway Company; and to authorize the laying down of additional Rails for the Narrow Gauge on that Railway.
West Midland Railway (Additional Works) Act 1862	25 & 26 Vict. c. clxviii	17 July 1862
An Act to authorize the West Midland Railway Company to construct additional Works, and to raise further Sums of Money; to provide Facilities for the Passage of their Traffic to Newport in the County of Monmouth; to regulate their Powers of raising Money in respect of certain other Undertakings; and for other Purposes.
Weston-super-Mare Pier Act 1862	25 & 26 Vict. c. clxix	17 July 1862
An Act for constructing and maintaining a Pier at Weston-super-Mare in the County of Somerset.
Londonderry and Coleraine Railway Arrangements Act 1862	25 & 26 Vict. c. clxx	17 July 1862
An Act to facilitate Arrangements by the Londonderry and Coleraine Railway Company with their Creditors; and for other Purposes.
Rickmansworth, Amersham, and Chesham Railway Act 1862 (repealed)	25 & 26 Vict. c. clxxi	17 July 1862
An Act for making Railways from Rickmansworth in the County of Hertford to Amersham and Chesham in the County of Buckingham; and for other Purposes. (Repealed by Statute Law (Repeals) Act 2013 (c. 2))
Carmarthen and Cardigan Railway Act 1862	25 & 26 Vict. c. clxxii	29 July 1862
An Act to enable the Carmarthen and Cardigan Railway Company to extend their Railway from Llangeller to Newcastle-Emlyn, and to raise further Monies.
Kettering and Thrapstone Railway Act 1862	25 & 26 Vict. c. clxxiii	29 July 1862
An Act for making a Railway from Kettering to Thrapstone in the County of Northampton; and for other Purposes.
Metropolitan Meat and Poultry Market (Western Approach) Act 1862	25 & 26 Vict. c. clxxiv	29 July 1862
An Act to improve the Western Approach to the Metropolitan Meat and Poultry Market, and to authorize the raising of additional Money.
Stafford and Uttoxeter Railway Act 1862	25 & 26 Vict. c. clxxv	29 July 1862
An Act for making a Railway from Stafford in the County of Stafford to Uttoxeter in the same County; and for other Purposes.
Aberystwith and Welsh Coast Railway Act 1862 or the Aberystwyth and Welsh Coast Railway Act 1862	25 & 26 Vict. c. clxxvi	29 July 1862
An Act for authorizing the Aberystwith and Welsh Coast Railway Company to make and maintain additional Lines of Railway, and to reclaim Lands near to their Lines of Railway, and to raise further Monies; and for other Purposes.
Andover and Redbridge Railway Amendment Act 1862	25 & 26 Vict. c. clxxvii	29 July 1862
An Act for conferring further Powers upon the Andover and Redbridge Railway Company.
Briton Ferry Dock Act 1862	25 & 26 Vict. c. clxxviii	29 July 1862
An Act for authorizing Agreements between the Briton Ferry Dock and Railway Company and other Companies, and a Lease of Part of their Wharfs and for altering Rates payable to the Neath Harbour Commissioners; and for authorizing the Briton Ferry Dock and Railway Company to raise further Capital; and for other Purposes.
Cowbridge Railway Act 1862	25 & 26 Vict. c. clxxix	29 July 1862
An Act for making Railways from Cowbridge in the County of Glamorgan to join the Llantrissant and Taff Vale Junction Railway and the South Wales Railway; and for other Purpose.
Pulteney Harbour Amendment Act 1862 (repealed)	25 & 26 Vict. c. clxxx	29 July 1862
An Act to authorize the British Fisheries Society to construct Piers or Breakwaters, and other Works in connexion with Pulteney Harbour, and to amend the Act (Note: Pulteney Harbour Act 1857 (20 & 21 Vict. c. xciii)) relating thereto. (Repealed by Pulteney Harbour Act 1879 (42 & 43 Vict. c. cxlix))
Edinburgh, Perth and Dundee Railway (Fife and Kinross Amalgamation) Act 1862	25 & 26 Vict. c. clxxxi	29 July 1862
An Act to amalgamate the Fife and Kinross Railway Company with the Edinburgh, Perth, and Dundee Railway Company.
Vale of Neath Railway Act 1862	25 & 26 Vict. c. clxxxii	29 July 1862
An Act for authorizing the Vale of Neath Railway Company to lay down Rails for the Narrow Gauge as well as the Broad Gauge on the Vale of Neath Railway, and to raise further Monies; and for other Purposes.
West Midland and Severn Valley Railways Act 1862	25 & 26 Vict. c. clxxxiii	29 July 1862
An Act to authorize an Alteration of the Terms of the Lease of the Severn Valley Railway to the West Midland Railway Company; and for other Purposes.
Brecon and Merthyr Railway Act 1862	25 & 26 Vict. c. clxxxiv	29 July 1862
An Act to enable the Brecon and Merthyr Tydfil Junction Railway Company to make new Railways, and for other Purposes.
West Shropshire Mineral Railway Act 1862	25 & 26 Vict. c. clxxxv	29 July 1862
An Act for making a Railway in the County of Salop, to be called "The West Shropshire Mineral Railway;" and for other Purposes.
Brecon Markets Act 1862	25 & 26 Vict. c. clxxxvi	29 July 1862
An Act for incorporating "The Brecon Markets Company," and for vesting in them, and authorizing them to maintain and regulate, the Markets and Fairs in Brecon, and other Property of the Mayor, Aldermen, and Burgesses of the Borough of Brecon; and for providing for the Discharge of Liabilities of the Mayor, Aldermen, and Burgesses; and for other Purposes.
Eastern Counties Railway (Epping Lines) Act 1862	25 & 26 Vict. c. clxxxvii	29 July 1862
An Act to confer Powers upon the Eastern Counties Railway Company with respect to the Epping Railways; and for other Purposes.
Middle Level Act 1862	25 & 26 Vict. c. clxxxviii	29 July 1862
An Act to separate the Middle Level from the Bedford Level Corporation; to transfer the Powers and Duties of the Nene Navigation Commissioners to the Middle Level Commissioners, and to provide for Payment of the Debt secured on the Navigation Tolls; to repeal the Barrier Banks Acts; to amend the Middle Level Acts, and to incorporate the Middle Level Commissioners; to amend and enlarge the Powers of Commissioners acting under District Acts in the Middle Level; and for other Purposes.
North British, Edinburgh, Perth and Dundee and West of Fife Railways Amalgamation Act 1862	25 & 26 Vict. c. clxxxix	29 July 1862
An Act for amalgamating the North British Railway and the Edinburgh, Perth, and Dundee Railway and the West of Fife Railway and Harbour Companies, and for other Purposes.
West Cheshire Railways Act 1862	25 & 26 Vict. c. cxc	29 July 1862
An Act for authorizing the West Cheshire Railway Company to make and maintain additional Lines of Railway and other Works, and to raise further Monies; and for other Purposes.
Waterford and Limerick Railway Act 1862	25 & 26 Vict. c. cxci	29 July 1862
An Act for authorizing the Waterford and Limerick Railway Company to divert their Tramway in the City of Limerick, and to work or lease the Undertaking of the Limerick and Ennis Railway Company.
London, Chatham and Dover Railway (Additional Powers) Act 1862	25 & 26 Vict. c. cxcii	29 July 1862
An Act to authorize the London, Chatham, and Dover Railway Company to construct additional Works and acquire additional Land in Kent and Surrey; and for other Purposes connected with their Undertakings.
Dulas Valley Mineral Railway Act 1862	25 & 26 Vict. c. cxciii	29 July 1862
An Act to authorize the Construction of a Railway in the Counties of Glamorgan and Brecon, to be called "The Dulas Valley Mineral Railway," and for other Purposes.
Cannock Chase Railway (Extension) Act 1862	25 & 26 Vict. c. cxciv	29 July 1862
An Act for making a Railway to connect the South Staffordshire Railway with the Cannock Chase Railway in the County of Stafford, and for other Purposes.
Eastern Union Railway Act 1862	25 & 26 Vict. c. cxcv	29 July 1862
An Act to enable the Eastern Union Railway Company to make certain Arrangements concerning their Capital, and to subscribe to the Waveney Valley Railway.
Great Western, Hereford, Ross and Gloucester, and Ely Valley Railways Act 1862	25 & 26 Vict. c. cxcvi	29 July 1862
An Act for transferring the Hereford, Ross, and Gloucester Railway and for leasing the Ely Valley Railway to the Great Western Railway Company, and for other Purposes.
Kent Coast Railway Act 1862	25 & 26 Vict. c. cxcvii	29 July 1862
An Act to empower the Kent Coast Railway Company to construct Railways or Tramways at Ramsgate, and to raise further Money; and for other Purposes.
Shrewsbury and Hereford Railway (Leasing) Act 1862	25 & 26 Vict. c. cxcviii	29 July 1862
An Act to enable the Shrewsbury and Hereford Railway Company to lease their Undertaking, to acquire additional Lands; and for other Purposes.
Spalding and Bourn Railway Act 1862	25 & 26 Vict. c. cxcix	29 July 1862
An Act for making a Railway, to be called "The Spalding and Bourn Railway," and for other Purposes.
Tottenham and Hampstead Junction Railway Act 1862	25 & 26 Vict. c. cc	29 July 1862
An Act for making a Railway to be called "The Tottenham and Hampstead Junction Railway," and for other Purposes.
Great Northern and Western (of Ireland) Railway Act 1862	25 & 26 Vict. c. cci	29 July 1862
An Act to enable the Great Northern and Western (of Ireland) Railway Company to make a Railway to Ballina; and for other Purposes.
Carnarvonshire Railway Act 1862	25 & 26 Vict. c. ccii	29 July 1862
An Act for making a Railway from Carnarvon to Port Madoc in the County of Carnarvon.
Aberdeen Police and Waterworks Act 1862 (repealed)	25 & 26 Vict. c. cciii	7 August 1862
An Act for paving cleansing, lighting, watching, draining, and improving the City of Aberdeen and adjacent Districts, for regulating the Police thereof, for supplying the Inhabitants with Water, and for other Purposes. (Repealed by Aberdeen Corporation (Administration Finance, &c.) Order Confirmation Act 1940 (3 & 4 Geo. 6. c. iii))
Glasgow Police Act 1862 (repealed)	25 & 26 Vict. c. cciv	7 August 1862
An Act to consolidate and amend the Acts relating to the Police and Statute Labour of the City of Glasgow, and for other Purposes. (Repealed by Glasgow Police Act 1866 (29 & 30 Vict. c. cclxxiii))
Salford Improvement Act 1862	25 & 26 Vict. c. ccv	7 August 1862
An Act for consolidating and amending the Acts relating to the Corporation of Salford; for extending their Powers; and for other Purposes.
East Gloucestershire Railway Act 1862	25 & 26 Vict. c. ccvi	7 August 1862
An Act for incorporating a Company; and for making and maintaining the East Gloucestershire Railway; and for other Purposes.
East Grinstead, Groombridge and Tunbridge Wells Railway Act 1862	25 & 26 Vict. c. ccvii	7 August 1862
An Act for making a Railway, to be called "The East Grinstead, Groombridge, and Tunbridge Wells Railway," and for other Purposes.
London and North Western Railway (Additional Powers) Act 1862	25 & 26 Vict. c. ccviii	7 August 1862
An Act for conferring additional Powers on the London and North-western Railway Company in relation to their own Undertaking and the Undertakings of other Companies; and for authorizing a Deviation in the Line of the South Leicestershire Railway; and for other Purposes.
Merthyr, Tredegar and Abergavenny Railway (Leasing) Act 1862	25 & 26 Vict. c. ccix	7 August 1862
An Act to enable the Merthyr, Tredegar, and Abergavenny Rail way Company to lease their Railway.
Mid Sussex and Midhurst Junction Railway Sale or Lease Act 1862	25 & 26 Vict. c. ccx	7 August 1862
An Act for enabling the Mid-Sussex and Midhurst Junction Rail way Company to extend the Time for completing their Railway; to sell or lease their Undertaking to the London, Brighton, and South Coast Railway Company; and for other Purposes.
West Riding and Grimsby Railway Act 1862	25 & 26 Vict. c. ccxi	7 August 1862
An Act to authorize the Construction of a Railway from the Bradford, Wakefield, and Leeds Railway at Wakefield to the South Yorkshire Railway at Barnby-upon-Don, and of certain Branch Railways, to be called "The West Riding and Grimsby Railway."
Dovey Reclamation Act 1862	25 & 26 Vict. c. ccxii	7 August 1862
An Act for incorporating the Dovey Reclamation Company; and for authorizing them to reclaim Land in the Estuary of the River Dovey; and for authorizing Arrangements between them and the Aberystwith and Welsh Coast Railway Company; and for other Purposes.
Dagenham (Thames) Dock Act 1862	25 & 26 Vict. c. ccxiii	7 August 1862
An Act for extending the Time for the Purchase of Lands and the Completion of the Works authorized by "The Dagenham Thames Dock Act, 1855," (Note: Dagenham (Thames) Dock Act 1855 (18 & 19 Vict. c. clxii)) and for other Purposes.
Redditch Railway Act 1862	25 & 26 Vict. c. ccxiv	7 August 1862
An Act for authorizing the Redditch Railway Company to raise further Monies; and for other Purposes.
Kensington Station and North and South London Junction Railway Act 1862 (repealed)	25 & 26 Vict. c. ccxv	7 August 1862
An Act to extend the Time for making the Railway of the Kensington Station and North and South London Junction Railway Company; and for other Purposes. (Repealed by Statute Law (Repeals) Act 2013 (c. 2))
Abingdon Railway Act 1862	25 & 26 Vict. c. ccxvi	7 August 1862
An Act for authorizing the Abingdon Railway Company to raise further Monies and for other Purposes.
Waterford and Passage Railway Act 1862	25 & 26 Vict. c. ccxvii	7 August 1862
An Act for making a Railway from the Waterford and Tramore Railway near the City of Waterford to the Town of Passage in the County of Waterford.
Oswestry, Ellesmere and Whitchurch Railway (Extension) Act 1862	25 & 26 Vict. c. ccxviii	7 August 1862
An Act for authorizing an Extension of the Oswestry, Ellesmere, and Whitchurch Railway, and for other Purposes.
Newcastle (County Down) Railway Act 1862	25 & 26 Vict. c. ccxix	7 August 1862
An Act to authorize the Construction of a Railway in the County of Down from the Downpatrick and Newry Railway to Newcastle.
Charing Cross Railway (City Terminus Bridge) Act 1862	25 & 26 Vict. c. ccxx	7 August 1862
An Act for amending "The Charing Cross Railway (City Terminus) Act, 1861." (Note: Charing Cross Railway (City Terminus) Act 1861 (24 & 25 Vict. c. xciii))
Wrexham, Mold and Connah's Quay Railway Act 1862	25 & 26 Vict. c. ccxxi	7 August 1862
An Act for incorporating a Company for making and maintaining the Wrexham, Mold, and Connah's Quay Junction Railway; and for other Purposes.
Mersey, &c. Protection Act 1862	25 & 26 Vict. c. ccxxii	7 August 1862
An Act to protect the Waters of the Mersey and the Irwell and of certain of their Tributaries from certain Obstructions.
Great Eastern Railway Act 1862	25 & 26 Vict. c. ccxxiii	7 August 1862
An Act to amalgamate the Eastern Counties, the East Anglian, the Newmarket, the Eastern Union, and the Norfolk Railway Companies; and for other Purposes.
Mid Kent Railway (Bromley to St. Mary's Cray) Leasing and Transfer Act 1862	25 & 26 Vict. c. ccxxiv	7 August 1862
An Act for a Lease of the Undertaking of the Mid Kent Railway (Bromley to Saint Mary's Cray) Company to the London, Chatham, and Dover Railway Company, and for other Purposes.
Somerset and Dorset Companies Amalgamation Act 1862 or the Somerset and Dorset Railway Companies Amalgamation Act 1862	25 & 26 Vict. c. ccxxv	7 August 1862
An Act for the Amalgamation of the Somerset Central Railway Company and the Dorset Central Railway Company, and for other Purposes.
Wellington and Drayton Railway Act 1862	25 & 26 Vict. c. ccxxvi	7 August 1862
An Act to authorize the Construction of a Railway in Shropshire, to be called "The Wellington and Drayton Railway."
Sidmouth Railway and Harbour Act 1862 (repealed)	25 & 26 Vict. c. ccxxvii	7 August 1862
An Act for making a Railway and Harbour in the County of Devon, to be called the Sidmouth Railway and Harbour, and for other Purposes. (Repealed by Statute Law (Repeals) Act 2013 (c. 2))

=== Private acts ===
Short title	Citation	Royal assent
Long title
Phillimore's Estate Act 1862	25 & 26 Vict. c. 1 Pr.	30 June 1862
An Act to confirm certain Contracts for granting Leases made and entered into by Charles Phillimore Esquire of Part of the Lands and Hereditaments devised by the Will of William Robert Phillimore Esquire, deceased, situate in the Parish of Saint Mary Abbotts, Kensington in the County of Middlesex, and to confirm certain Leases granted in pursuance of the said Contracts, and for other Purposes relating to the said Will.
Mackintosh Farr Fund Act 1862	25 & 26 Vict. c. 2 Pr.	29 July 1862
An Act for incorporating the Trustees under the Will of Captain William Mackintosh, for defining and explaining the said Will, and for carrying into effect the Purposes thereof.
Tufnell Park Estate Act 1862	25 & 26 Vict. c. 3 Pr.	29 July 1862
An Act to extend the Powers given to the Trustees of the Will of William Tufnell Esquire by an Act of Parliament passed in the Third Year of the Reign of His late Majesty King George the Fourth, intituled "An Act for enabling the Trustee under the Will of the late William Tufnell Esquire to reduce the Fines for the Copyholds held of the Manor of Barnersbury, devised by his Will, as an Encouragement to the Tenants to build thereon, to grant Building and Repairing Leases of the devised Estates; and for other Purposes." (Note: Tufnell's Estate Act 1822 (3 Geo. 4. c. 18 Pr.))
Saint Thomas's Hospital Act 1862	25 & 26 Vict. c. 4 Pr.	7 August 1862
An Act to enable the Mayor and Commonalty and Citizens of the City of London, Governors of the Possessions, Revenues, and Goods of the Hospital of Edward, late King of England the Sixth, of Saint Thomas the Apostle, commonly called "Saint Thomas's Hospital," to convey the Site of the present Hospital to the Charing Cross Railway Company, and to acquire a new Site for the same Hospital; and for other Purposes.
Shrewsbury Estate Act 1862	25 & 26 Vict. c. 5 Pr.	7 August 1862
An Act for amending the Powers of Leasing and other Powers created by divers Acts relating to the Estates annexed to the Earldom of Shrewsbury; and for other Purposes.
Corbet's Estate Act 1862	25 & 26 Vict. c. 6 Pr.	7 August 1862
An Act to authorize the Trustees of the Will of Athelstan Corbet Esquire, deceased, to grant Building Leases and Mining Leases of the Estates thereby devised, and to raise Five thousand Pounds out of the same Estates, and apply such Sum in the Improvement of the Port of Aberdovey and Lands adjoining thereto; and for other Purposes.
Dollow and Kilmore Commons (Tipperary) Inclosure Act 1862 (Note: This act was not printed by the Queen's Printer.)	25 & 26 Vict. c. 7 Pr.	3 June 1862
An Act for inclosing the Commons or Waste Lands called "Dollow and Kilmore Commons" in the Parishes of Dollow and Kilmore in the County of Tipperary.
Gore Munbee's Divorce Act 1862	25 & 26 Vict. c. 8 Pr.	30 June 1862
An Act to dissolve the Marriage of Colonel Gore Boland Munbee with Sophia Catherine his now Wife, and to enable him to marry again; and for other Purposes.

=== Sources ===
- A Collection of the Public General Statutes. London: Eyre & Spottiswoode. 1862 – via Google Books.
- A Collection of the Public General Statutes. London: Eyre & Spottiswoode. 1862 – via Google Books.

== See also ==
- List of acts of the Parliament of the United Kingdom
