= List of acts of the Parliament of the United Kingdom from 1871 =

This is a complete list of acts of the Parliament of the United Kingdom for the year 1871.

Note that the first parliament of the United Kingdom was held in 1801; parliaments between 1707 and 1800 were either parliaments of Great Britain or of Ireland). For acts passed up until 1707, see the list of acts of the Parliament of England and the list of acts of the Parliament of Scotland. For acts passed from 1707 to 1800, see the list of acts of the Parliament of Great Britain. See also the list of acts of the Parliament of Ireland.

For acts of the devolved parliaments and assemblies in the United Kingdom, see the list of acts of the Scottish Parliament, the list of acts of the Northern Ireland Assembly, and the list of acts and measures of Senedd Cymru; see also the list of acts of the Parliament of Northern Ireland.

The number shown after each act's title is its chapter number. Acts passed before 1963 are cited using this number, preceded by the year(s) of the reign during which the relevant parliamentary session was held; thus the Union with Ireland Act 1800 is cited as "39 & 40 Geo. 3 c. 67", meaning the 67th act passed during the session that started in the 39th year of the reign of George III and which finished in the 40th year of that reign. Note that the modern convention is to use Arabic numerals in citations (thus "41 Geo. 3" rather than "41 Geo. III"). Acts of the last session of the Parliament of Great Britain and the first session of the Parliament of the United Kingdom are both cited as "41 Geo. 3".

Some of these acts have a short title. Some of these acts have never had a short title. Some of these acts have a short title given to them by later acts, such as by the Short Titles Act 1896.

== 34 & 35 Vict. ==
The third session of the 20th Parliament of the United Kingdom, which met from 9 February 1871 until 21 August 1871.

=== Public general acts ===
Short title	Citation	Royal assent
Long title
Annuity to Princess Louise Act 1871 (repealed)	34 & 35 Vict. c. 1	28 February 1871
An Act to enable Her Majesty to settle an Annuity on Her Royal Highness the Princess Louise Caroline Alberta. (Repealed by Statute Law Revision Act 1953 (2 & 3 Eliz. 2. c. 5))
Juries Act 1871 (repealed)	34 & 35 Vict. c. 2	28 February 1871
An Act to repeal Section Twenty-two of "The Juries Act, 1870." (Note: Juries Act 1870 (33 & 34 Vict. c. 77)) (Repealed by Statute Law Revision (No. 2) Act 1893 (56 & 57 Vict. c. 54))
Parliamentary Costs Act 1871 (repealed)	34 & 35 Vict. c. 3	28 February 1871
An Act to empower Committees on Bills confirming or giving effect to Provisional Orders to award costs, and examine witnesses on oath. (Repealed by Parliamentary Costs Act 2006 (c. 37))
Stamps Act 1871 (repealed)	34 & 35 Vict. c. 4	30 March 1871
An Act to amend "The Stamp Act, 1870," (Note: Stamp Act 1870 (33 & 34 Vict. c. 97)) in relation to Foreign Securities, Mortgages of Stock, and Proxy Papers. (Repealed by Stamp Act 1891 (54 & 55 Vict. c. 39))
Income Tax Act 1871 (repealed)	34 & 35 Vict. c. 5	30 March 1871
An Act to make provision for the Assessment of Income Tax. (Repealed by Statute Law Revision Act 1883 (46 & 47 Vict. c. 39))
Consolidated Fund (£462,580 9s. 11d.) Act 1871 or the Supply Act 1871 (repealed)	34 & 35 Vict. c. 6	30 March 1871
An Act to apply the sum of four hundred and sixty-two thousand five hundred and eighty pounds nine shillings and elevenpence out of the Consolidated Fund to the service of the years ending the thirty-first day of March one thousand eight hundred and seventy and one thousand eight hundred and seventy-one. (Repealed by Statute Law Revision Act 1883 (46 & 47 Vict. c. 39))
Consolidated Fund (£5,411,900) Act 1871 or the Supply Act 1871 (repealed)	34 & 35 Vict. c. 7	31 March 1871
An Act to apply the sum of five million four hundred and eleven thousand nine hundred pounds out of the Consolidated Fund to the service of the year ending the thirty-first day of March one thousand eight hundred and seventy-two. (Repealed by Statute Law Revision Act 1883 (46 & 47 Vict. c. 39))
West Africa Offences Act 1871 (repealed)	34 & 35 Vict. c. 8	31 March 1871
An Act for extending the Jurisdiction of the Courts of the West African Settlements to certain Offences committed out of Her Majesty's Dominions. (Repealed by Statute Law Revision Act 1958 (6 & 7 Eliz. 2. c. 46))
Mutiny Act 1871 (repealed)	34 & 35 Vict. c. 9	24 April 1871
An Act for punishing Mutiny and Desertion, and for the better payment of the Army and their Quarters. (Repealed by Statute Law Revision Act 1883 (46 & 47 Vict. c. 39))
Marine Mutiny Act 1871 (repealed)	34 & 35 Vict. c. 10	24 April 1871
An Act for the Regulation of Her Majesty's Royal Marine Forces while on shore. (Repealed by Statute Law Revision Act 1883 (46 & 47 Vict. c. 39))
Poor Law Loans Act 1871 (repealed)	34 & 35 Vict. c. 11	24 April 1871
An Act to make further provision in reference to Loans obtained under the Poor Law Acts. (Repealed by Poor Law Act 1927 (17 & 18 Geo. 5. c. 14))
Fairs Act 1871	34 & 35 Vict. c. 12	25 May 1871
An Act to further amend the Law relating to Fairs in England and Wales.
Public Parks, Schools, and Museums Act 1871 (repealed)	34 & 35 Vict. c. 13	25 May 1871
An Act to facilitate Gifts of Land for Public Parks, Schools, and Museums. (Repealed by Mortmain and Charitable Uses Act 1888 (51 & 52 Vict. c. 42))
County Property Act 1871 (repealed)	34 & 35 Vict. c. 14	25 May 1871
An Act to provide for the vesting of County Property in the Clerk of the Peace for the County. (Repealed by Statute Law Revision (No. 2) Act 1893 (56 & 57 Vict. c. 54))
Metropolitan Poor Act 1871 (repealed)	34 & 35 Vict. c. 15	25 May 1871
An Act to amend The Metropolitan Poor Act, 1867. (Note: Metropolitan Poor Act 1867 (30 & 31 Vict. c. 6)) (Repealed by Poor Law Act 1927 (17 & 18 Geo. 5. c. 14))
Anatomy Act 1871 (repealed)	34 & 35 Vict. c. 16	25 May 1871
An Act to amend the Act of the second and third years of William the Fourth, chapter seventy-five, (Note: Anatomy Act 1832 (2 & 3 Will. 4. c. 75)) for regulating Schools of Anatomy. (Repealed by Anatomy Act 1984 (c. 14))
Bank Holidays Act 1871 (repealed)	34 & 35 Vict. c. 17	25 May 1871
An Act to make provision for Bank Holidays, and respecting obligations to make payments and do other acts on such Bank Holidays. (Repealed by Banking and Financial Dealings Act 1971 (c. 80))
Justices Qualification Act 1871 (repealed)	34 & 35 Vict. c. 18	25 May 1871
An Act to amend the Law disqualifying Attorneys, Solicitors, and Proctors in practice from being Justices of the Peace for counties. (Repealed by Justices of the Peace Act 1906 (6 Edw. 7. c. 16))
Factory and Workshop (Jews) Act 1871 or the Working of Jews on Sunday Act 1871 (repealed)	34 & 35 Vict. c. 19	25 May 1871
An Act for exempting persons professing the Jewish religion from penalties in respect of young persons and females professing the said religion working on Sundays. (Repealed by Factory and Workshop Act 1878 (41 & 42 Vict. c. 16))
Consolidated Fund (£7,000,000) Act 1871 or the Supply Act 1871 (repealed)	34 & 35 Vict. c. 20	25 May 1871
An Act to apply the sum of seven million pounds out of the Consolidated Fund to the service of the year ending the thirty-first day of March one thousand eight hundred and seventy-two. (Repealed by Statute Law Revision Act 1883 (46 & 47 Vict. c. 39))
Customs and Income Tax Act 1871 (repealed)	34 & 35 Vict. c. 21	25 May 1871
An Act to grant Duties of Customs and Income Tax. (Repealed by Customs Consolidation Act 1876 (39 & 40 Vict. c. 36) and Statute Law Revision Act 1883 (46 & 47 Vict. c. 39))
Lunacy Regulation (Ireland) Act 1871 (repealed)	34 & 35 Vict. c. 22	25 May 1871
Rectory of Ewelme Act 1871	34 & 35 Vict. c. 23	16 June 1871
An Act for re-vesting in Her Majesty, her heirs and successors, the Rectory of Newelme alias Ewelme, in the county of Oxford.
Irish Presbyterian Church Act 1871	34 & 35 Vict. c. 24	16 June 1871
An Act for regulating the management by the Trustees of the Presbyterian Church in Ireland of certain trust properties for the said Church, and for other purposes.
Protection of Life and Property in Certain Parts of Ireland Act 1871 or the Protection of Life and Property (Ireland) Act 1871 or the Westmeath Act 1871 (repealed)	34 & 35 Vict. c. 25	16 June 1871
An Act to empower the Lord Lieutenant or other Chief Governor or Governors of Ireland to apprehend and detain for a limited time persons suspected of being members of the Ribbon Society, or of being concerned in the commission of any crime or outrage under the direction or influence of said Ribbon Society in the county of Westmeath, or in certain adjoining portions of the county of Meath and the King's County; and to continue "The Peace Preservation (Ireland) Act, 1870." (Note: Peace Preservation (Ireland) Act 1870 (33 & 34 Vict. c. 9)) (Repealed by Statute Law Revision Act 1883 (46 & 47 Vict. c. 39))
Universities Tests Act 1871	34 & 35 Vict. c. 26	16 June 1871
An Act to alter the law respecting Religious Tests in the Universities of Oxford, Cambridge, and Durham, and in the Halls and Colleges of those Universities.
Debenture Stock Act 1871 (repealed)	34 & 35 Vict. c. 27	29 June 1871
An Act to remove doubts as to the power of Trustees to invest Trust Funds in Debenture Stocks. (Repealed for England and Wales and Ireland by Trustee Act 1893 (56 & 57 Vict. c. 53) and for Scotland by Trusts (Scotland) Act 1921 (11 & 12 Geo. 5. c. 58))
British North America Act 1871 known in Canada as the Constitution Act, 1871	34 & 35 Vict. c. 28	29 June 1871
An Act respecting the establishment of Provinces in the Dominion of Canada.
India Stock Dividends Act 1871 (repealed)	34 & 35 Vict. c. 29	29 June 1871
An Act to facilitate the Payment of Dividends on India Stocks. (Repealed by East India Loans Act 1937 (1 Edw. 8 & 1 Geo. 6. c. 14))
Post Office (Duties) Act 1871 (repealed)	34 & 35 Vict. c. 30	29 June 1871
An Act for the further regulation of the Duties on Postage. (Repealed by Statute Law Revision (No. 2) Act 1893 (56 & 57 Vict. c. 54) (Note: Incorrectly cited as "SLR, 1893" in the Chronological Table of the Statutes.))
Trade Union Act 1871	34 & 35 Vict. c. 31	29 June 1871
An Act to amend the Law relating to Trades Unions. (Repealed for England and Wales and Scotland by Industrial Relations Act 1971 (c. 72))
Criminal Law Amendment Act 1871 (repealed)	34 & 35 Vict. c. 32	29 June 1871
An Act to amend the Criminal Law relating to Violence, Threats, and Molestation. (Repealed by Conspiracy and Protection of Property Act 1875 (38 & 39 Vict. c. 86))
Burial Act 1871 (repealed)	34 & 35 Vict. c. 33	29 June 1871
An Act to explain and amend the Burial Acts. (Repealed by Local Government Act 1972 (c. 70))
Indian Councils Act 1871 (repealed)	34 & 35 Vict. c. 34	29 June 1871
An Act to extend in certain respects the power of Local Legislatures in India as regards European British subjects. (Repealed by Government of India Act 1915 (5 & 6 Geo. 5. c. 61))
Metropolitan Police Court (Buildings) Act 1871 (repealed)	34 & 35 Vict. c. 35	29 June 1871
An Act to transfer to the Commissioners of Her Majesty's Works and Public Buildings the property in and control over the buildings and property of the Police Courts of the Metropolis and for other purposes relating thereto. (Repealed by Metropolitan Police Courts Act 1897 (60 & 61 Vict. c. 26))
Pensions Commutation Act 1871	34 & 35 Vict. c. 36	29 June 1871
An Act to extend the provisions of the Pension Commutation Acts 1869 (Note: Pensions Commutation Act 1869 (32 & 33 Vict. c. 32)) and 1870, (Note: Pensions Commutation Act 1870 (33 & 34 Vict. c. 101)) to certain Public Civil Officers, and to consolidate and amend the said Acts.
Prayer Book (Tables of Lessons) Act 1871	34 & 35 Vict. c. 37	13 July 1871
An Act to amend the law relating to the Tables of Lessons and Psalter contained in the Prayer Book.
Public Health (Scotland) Amendment Act 1871 (repealed)	34 & 35 Vict. c. 38	13 July 1871
An Act for amending the Public Health (Scotland) Act, 1867. (Note: Public Health (Scotland) Act 1867 (30 & 31 Vict. c. 101)) (Repealed by Public Health (Scotland) Act 1897 (60 & 61 Vict. c. 38))
Metropolitan Building Act 1871 (repealed)	34 & 35 Vict. c. 39	13 July 1871
An Act to amend the Metropolitan Building Act, 1855, (Note: Metropolitan Building Act 1855 (18 & 19 Vict. c. 122)) by adding to the exemptions from Part I. of the Act the Buildings of the New Foreign Cattle Market on the site of Deptford Dock. (Repealed by London Building Act 1894 (57 & 58 Vict. c. ccxiii))
Primitive Wesleyan Methodist Society of Ireland Act 1871	34 & 35 Vict. c. 40	13 July 1871
An Act to alter and regulate the Proceedings and Powers of the Primitive Wesleyan Methodist Society of Ireland, and for other purposes.
Gasworks Clauses Act 1871 (repealed)	34 & 35 Vict. c. 41	13 July 1871
An Act to amend the Gasworks Clauses Act, 1847. (Note: Gasworks Clauses Act 1847 (10 & 11 Vict. c. 15)) (Repealed for England and Wales and Scotland by Gas Act 1948 (11 & 12 Geo. 6. c. 67) and for Northern Ireland by Gas (Northern Ireland) Order 1977 (SI 1977/596 (N.I. 7)))
Citation Amendment (Scotland) Act 1871 (repealed)	34 & 35 Vict. c. 42	13 July 1871
An Act to amend the Process of Citation in Scotland. (Repealed by Statute Law (Repeals) Act 1978 (c. 45))
Ecclesiastical Dilapidations Act 1871 (repealed)	34 & 35 Vict. c. 43	13 July 1871
An Act for the Amendment of the Law relating to Ecclesiastical Dilapidations. (Repealed by Repair of Benefice Buildings Measure 1972 (No. 2))
Incumbents Resignation Act 1871 (repealed)	34 & 35 Vict. c. 44	13 July 1871
An Act to enable Clergymen permanently incapacitated by illness to resign their Benefices with provision of Pensions. (Repealed by Clergy Pensions Measure 1961 (9 & 10 Eliz. 2. No. 3))
Sequestration Act 1871 (repealed)	34 & 35 Vict. c. 45	13 July 1871
An Act for amending the Law relating to Sequestration of Ecclesiastical Benefices. (Repealed by Statute Law (Repeals) Measure 2018 (No. 1))
Bath City Prison Act 1871 (repealed)	34 & 35 Vict. c. 46	13 July 1871
An Act for amending the Law relating to the appointment of the Gaoler, Chaplain, and Matron of the Prison of the City of Bath. (Repealed by Statute Law Revision Act 1883 (46 & 47 Vict. c. 39))
Metropolitan Board of Works (Loans) Act 1871 (repealed)	34 & 35 Vict. c. 47	13 July 1871
An Act for amending the Acts regulating the borrowing of Money by the Metropolitan Board of Works; and for other purposes relating thereto. (Repealed by London County Council (Finance Consolidation) Act 1912 (2 & 3 Geo. 5. c. cv))
Promissory Oaths Act 1871	34 & 35 Vict. c. 48	13 July 1871
An Act to repeal divers enactments relating to Oaths and Declarations which are not in force; and for other purposes connected therewith.
Matrimonial Causes and Marriage Law (Ireland) Amendment Act 1871	34 & 35 Vict. c. 49	13 July 1871
An Act to amend the Matrimonial Causes and Marriage Law (Ireland) Amendment Act, 1870. (Note: Matrimonial Causes and Marriage Law (Ireland) Amendment Act 1870 (33 & 34 Vict. c. 110))
Bankruptcy Disqualification Act 1871 (repealed)	34 & 35 Vict. c. 50	13 July 1871
An Act for disqualifying Bankrupts from sitting or voting in the House of Lords. (Repealed by Insolvency Act 1985 (c. 65))
Consolidated Fund (£10,000,000) Act 1871 or the Supply Act 1871 (repealed)	34 & 35 Vict. c. 51	24 July 1871
An Act to apply the sum of Ten million pounds out of the Consolidated Fund to the service of the year ending the thirty-first day of March one thousand eight hundred and seventy-two. (Repealed by Statute Law Revision Act 1883 (46 & 47 Vict. c. 39))
Exchequer Bonds Act 1871 (repealed)	34 & 35 Vict. c. 52	24 July 1871
An Act for raising the sum of Seven hundred thousand pounds by Exchequer Bonds for the service of the year ending on the thirty-first day of March one thousand eight hundred and seventy-two. (Repealed by Statute Law Revision Act 1883 (46 & 47 Vict. c. 39))
Ecclesiastical Titles Act 1871	34 & 35 Vict. c. 53	24 July 1871
An Act to repeal an Act (Note: Ecclesiastical Titles Act 1851 (14 & 15 Vict. c. 60)) for preventing the assumption of certain Ecclesiastical Titles in respect of places in the United Kingdom.
Kingsholm District Act 1871 (repealed)	34 & 35 Vict. c. 54	24 July 1871
An Act to settle a boundary within which a vote may be taken for the adoption of the Local Government Act by the district of Kingsholm in the county of Gloucester. (Repealed by City of Gloucester Extension and Improvement Act 1874 (37 & 38 Vict. c. cxi))
Criminal and Dangerous Lunatics (Scotland) Amendment Act 1871 (repealed)	34 & 35 Vict. c. 55	24 July 1871
An Act to amend the Law relating to criminal and dangerous Lunatics in Scotland. (Repealed by Mental Health (Scotland) Act 1960 (8 & 9 Eliz. 2. c. 61))
Dogs Act 1871	34 & 35 Vict. c. 56	24 July 1871
An Act to provide further Protection against Dogs. (Repealed for Northern Ireland by Dogs (Northern Ireland) Order 1983 (SI 1983/764 (N.I. 8)) and for Scotland by Control of Dogs (Scotland) Act 2010 (asp 9))
Courts of Justice (Additional Site) Act 1871 (repealed)	34 & 35 Vict. c. 57	24 July 1871
An Act to enable the Commissioners of Her Majesty's Works and Public Buildings to acquire additional Lands for improving the site of the Courts of Justice and the various offices belonging to the same. (Repealed by Administration of Justice Act 1965 (c. 2))
Life Assurance Companies Act 1871 (repealed)	34 & 35 Vict. c. 58	24 July 1871
An Act to amend the Life Assurance Companies Act, 1870. (Note: Life Assurance Companies Act 1870 (33 & 34 Vict. c. 61)) (Repealed by Assurance Companies Act 1909 (9 Edw. 7. c. 49))
Public Libraries Act (Scotland, 1867) Amendment Act 1871 (repealed)	34 & 35 Vict. c. 59	31 July 1871
An Act to amend The Public Libraries Scotland Act, 1867, (Note: Public Libraries (Scotland) Act 1867 (30 & 31 Vict. c. 37)) and to give additional facilities to the Local Authorities entrusted with carrying the same into execution. (Repealed by Public Libraries Consolidation (Scotland) Act 1887 (50 & 51 Vict. c. 42))
Public Schools Act 1871 (repealed)	34 & 35 Vict. c. 60	31 July 1871
An Act to amend the Public Schools Act, 1868. (Note: Public Schools Act 1868 (31 & 32 Vict. c. 118)) (Repealed by Statute Law (Repeals) Act 1998 (c. 43))
Election Commissioners Expenses Act 1871 (repealed)	34 & 35 Vict. c. 61	31 July 1871
An Act to amend the Corrupt Practices Commission Expenses Act, 1869. (Note: Corrupt Practices Commission Expenses Act 1869 (32 & 33 Vict. c. 21)) (Repealed by Representation of the People Act 1948 (11 & 12 Geo. 6. c. 65))
Indian Bishops Act 1871 (repealed)	34 & 35 Vict. c. 62	31 July 1871
An Act to enable Her Majesty to make regulations relative to the leave of absence of Indian Bishops on furlough and medical certificates. (Repealed by Government of India Act 1915 (5 & 6 Geo. 5. c. 61))
College Charter Act 1871	34 & 35 Vict. c. 63	31 July 1871
An Act to amend the Law respecting the granting of Charters in certain cases.
Annuity to Duke of Connaught Act 1871 (repealed)	34 & 35 Vict. c. 64	14 August 1871
An Act to enable Her Majesty to provide for the Support and Maintenance of His Royal Highness Prince Arthur William Patrick Albert on his coming of age. (Repealed by Statute Law Revision Act 1953 (2 & 3 Eliz. 2. c. 5))
Juries Act (Ireland) 1871 or the Juries (Ireland) Act 1871	34 & 35 Vict. c. 65	14 August 1871
An Act to amend and consolidate the Laws relating to Juries in Ireland.
Private Chapels Act 1871 (repealed)	34 & 35 Vict. c. 66	14 August 1871
An Act to amend and define the Law relating to Private Chapels, and to Chapels belonging to Colleges, Schools, Hospitals, Asylums, and other public institutions. (Repealed by Extra-Parochial Ministry Measure 1967 (No. 2))
Municipal Corporations Act 1859 Amendment Act (repealed)	34 & 35 Vict. c. 67	14 August 1871
An Act to amend the Municipal Corporation Act of 1859, with respect to the division of Boroughs into Wards. (Repealed by Municipal Corporations Act 1882 (45 & 46 Vict. c. 50))
Glasgow Boundaries Act 1871 (repealed)	34 & 35 Vict. c. 68	14 August 1871
An Act to determine the Boundaries of the Barony and Regality of Glasgow for purposes of Registration. (Repealed by Statute Law (Repeals) Act 1976 (c. 16))
Metropolitan Tramways Provisional Orders Suspension Act 1871 (repealed)	34 & 35 Vict. c. 69	14 August 1871
An Act to enable the Board of Trade to dispense with certain provisions of the Tramways Act, 1870, (Note: Tramways Act 1870 (33 & 34 Vict. c. 78)) in respect of certain Provisional Orders. (Repealed by Statute Law Revision Act 1883 (46 & 47 Vict. c. 39))
Local Government Board Act 1871 (repealed)	34 & 35 Vict. c. 70	14 August 1871
An Act for constituting a Local Government Board, and vesting therein certain functions of the Secretary of State and Privy Council concerning the Public Health and Local Government, together with the powers and duties of the Poor Law Board. (Repealed by Statute Law (Repeals) Act 1986 (c. 12))
Public Libraries Act 1855 Amendment Act 1871 (repealed)	34 & 35 Vict. c. 71	14 August 1871
An Act to amend the Public Libraries Act, 1855. (Note: Public Libraries Act 1855 (18 & 19 Vict. c. 70)) (Repealed by Public Libraries Act 1892 (55 & 56 Vict. c. 53))
Judgments Registry (Ireland) Act 1871 (repealed)	34 & 35 Vict. c. 72	14 August 1871
An Act for the further protection of Purchasers against Crown Debts, and for amending the Laws relating to the office of the Registrar of Judgments and other offices of the Court of Chancery, Ireland. (Repealed by Judgments (Enforcement) Act (Northern Ireland) 1969 (c. 30 (N.I.)))
Lancaster County Clerk Act 1871 (repealed)	34 & 35 Vict. c. 73	14 August 1871
An Act for making Regulations as to the office of Clerk of the Peace for the County Palatine of Lancaster. (Repealed by Local Government (Clerks) Act 1931 (21 & 22 Geo. 5. c. 45))
Bills of Exchange Act 1871 (repealed)	34 & 35 Vict. c. 74	14 August 1871
An Act to abolish Days of Grace in the case of Bills of Exchange and Promissory Notes payable at Sight or on Presentation. (Repealed by Bills of Exchange Act 1882 (45 & 46 Vict. c. 61))
Telegraph (Money) Act 1871 (repealed)	34 & 35 Vict. c. 75	14 August 1871
An Act for enabling a further sum to be raised for the purposes of the Telegraph Acts, 1868 to 1870. (Repealed by Statute Law Revision Act 1953 (2 & 3 Eliz. 2. c. 5))
Summary Jurisdiction (Ireland) Amendment Act 1871 (repealed)	34 & 35 Vict. c. 76	14 August 1871
An Act to amend the Law relating to the Recovery of Small Debts and to Summary Jurisdiction in Ireland. (Repealed by Statute Law Revision Act 1883 (46 & 47 Vict. c. 39))
Norwich Voters Disfranchisement Act 1871 (repealed)	34 & 35 Vict. c. 77	14 August 1871
An Act to disfranchise certain Voters for the City of Norwich. (Repealed by Redistribution of Seats Act 1885 (48 & 49 Vict. c. 23))
Regulation of Railways Act 1871	34 & 35 Vict. c. 78	14 August 1871
An Act to amend the Law respecting the Inspection and Regulation of Railways. (Repealed for England and Wales and Scotland by Railway Safety (Miscellaneous Provisions) Regulations 1997 (SI 1997/553))
Lodgers' Goods Protection Act 1871 (repealed)	34 & 35 Vict. c. 79	16 August 1871
An Act to protect the Goods of Lodgers against Distresses for Rent due to the Superior Landlord. (Repealed for England and Wales by Law of Distress Amendment Act 1908 (8 Edw. 7. c. 53) and for Northern Ireland by Judgments (Enforcement) Act (Northern Ireland) 1969 (c. 30 (N.I.)))
Industrial and Provident Societies Act 1871 (repealed)	34 & 35 Vict. c. 80	16 August 1871
An Act to explain and amend the Law relating to Industrial and Provident Societies. (Repealed by Industrial and Provident Societies Act 1876 (39 & 40 Vict. c. 45))
Reductions Ex Capite Lecti Abolished Act 1871 (repealed)	34 & 35 Vict. c. 81	16 August 1871
An Act to abolish Reductions ex capite lecti in Scotland. (Repealed by Statute Law Revision Act 1883 (46 & 47 Vict. c. 39))
Church Building Acts Amendment Act 1871 (repealed)	34 & 35 Vict. c. 82	16 August 1871
Church Building Acts Amendment Act, 1871. (Repealed by Statute Law Revision Act 1883 (46 & 47 Vict. c. 39))
Parliamentary Witnesses Oaths Act 1871	34 & 35 Vict. c. 83	16 August 1871
An Act for enabling the House of Commons and any Committee thereof to administer Oaths to Witnesses.
Limited Owners Residences Act (1870) Amendment Act 1871	34 & 35 Vict. c. 84	16 August 1871
An Act to amend "The Limited Owners Residences Act, 1870." (Note: Limited Owners Residences Act 1870 (33 & 34 Vict. c. 56)) (Repealed for Scotland by Abolition of Feudal Tenure etc. (Scotland) Act 2000 (asp 5))
Dean Forest (Mines) Act 1871	34 & 35 Vict. c. 85	16 August 1871
An Act to make further provision respecting the opening and working of mines and quarries in Her Majesty’s Forest of Dean, and in the Hundred of Saint Briavels, in the county of Gloucester; and for other purposes connected therewith.
Regulation of the Forces Act 1871 or the Army Reform Act 1871 (repealed)	34 & 35 Vict. c. 86	17 August 1871
An Act for the better Regulation of the Regular and Auxiliary Land Forces of the Crown; and for other purposes relating thereto. (Repealed by Reserve Forces Act 1980 (c. 9))
Sunday Observation Prosecution Act 1871 (repealed)	34 & 35 Vict. c. 87	17 August 1871
An Act to amend the Law with respect to Prosecutions for Offences against the Act of the twenty-ninth year of the reign of King Charles the Second, chapter seven, intituled "An Act for the better observation of the Lord's Day commonly called Sunday." (Note: Sunday Observance Act 1677 (29 Cha. 2. c. 7)) (Repealed by Statute Law Revision (No. 2) Act 1893 (56 & 57 Vict. c. 54), Police Act 1964 (c. 48) and Statute Law (Repeals) Act 1969 (c. 52))
Intoxicating Liquors (Licences Suspension) Act 1871 (repealed)	34 & 35 Vict. c. 88	17 August 1871
An Act to restrict during a limited time the grant by Justices of the Peace of new Licenses and Certificates for the Sale of Intoxicating Liquors by Retail; and for other purposes. (Repealed by Licensing Act 1872 (35 & 36 Vict. c. 94))
Appropriation Act 1871 (repealed)	34 & 35 Vict. c. 89	21 August 1871
An Act to apply a sum out of the Consolidated Fund to the service of the year ending the thirty-first day of March one thousand eight hundred and seventy-two, and to appropriate the Supplies granted in this Session of Parliament. (Repealed by Statute Law Revision Act 1883 (46 & 47 Vict. c. 39))
Union of Benefices Acts Amendment Act 1871 (repealed)	34 & 35 Vict. c. 90	21 August 1871
An Act to amend the Law relating to the Union of Benefices. (Repealed by Pastoral Measure 1968 (No. 1) and Statute Law (Repeals) Act 1974 (c. 22))
Judicial Committee Act 1871 (repealed)	34 & 35 Vict. c. 91	21 August 1871
An Act to make further provision for the despatch of business by the Judicial Committee of the Privy Council. (Repealed by Statute Law Revision (No. 2) Act 1893 (56 & 57 Vict. c. 54))
Landlord and Tenant (Ireland) Act 1871 (repealed)	34 & 35 Vict. c. 92	21 August 1871
An Act to amend the Landlord and Tenant (Ireland) Act, 1870. (Note: Landlord and Tenant (Ireland) Act 1870 (33 & 34 Vict. c. 46)) (Repealed by Property (Northern Ireland) Order 1997 (SI 1997/1179))
Epping Forest Act 1871 (repealed)	34 & 35 Vict. c. 93	21 August 1871
An Act to amend the Act twelfth and thirteenth Victoria chapter eighty-one; (Note: New Forest and Waltham Forest Act 1849 (12 & 13 Vict. c. 81)) and to extend the provisions of that Act and The Metropolitan Commons Act, 1866, (Note: Metropolitan Commons Act 1866 (29 & 30 Vict. c. 122)) so far as regards that part of Waltham Forest known as Epping Forest. (Repealed by Wild Creatures and Forest Laws Act 1971 (c. 47))
Elementary Education (Elections) Act 1871 or the Elementary Education (Election) Act 1871 (repealed)	34 & 35 Vict. c. 94	21 August 1871
An Act to amend Paragraph Three of the Second Schedule of the Elementary Education Act, 1870. (Note: Elementary Education Act 1870 (33 & 34 Vict. c. 75)) (Repealed by Statute Law Revision Act 1883 (46 & 47 Vict. c. 39))
Expiring Laws Continuance Act 1871 (repealed)	34 & 35 Vict. c. 95	21 August 1871
An Act to continue various expiring Laws. (Repealed by Statute Law Revision Act 1883 (46 & 47 Vict. c. 39))
Pedlars Act 1871	34 & 35 Vict. c. 96	21 August 1871
An Act for granting Certificates to Pedlars.
Military Manoeuvres Act 1871 (repealed)	34 & 35 Vict. c. 97	21 August 1871
An Act for making provision for facilitating the Manoeuvres of Troops to be assembled during the ensuing Autumn. (Repealed by Statute Law Revision Act 1883 (46 & 47 Vict. c. 39))
Vaccination Act 1871 (repealed)	34 & 35 Vict. c. 98	21 August 1871
An Act to amend the Vaccination Act, 1867. (Note: Vaccination Act 1867 (30 & 31 Vict. c. 84)) (Repealed by National Health Service Act 1946 (9 & 10 Geo. 6. c. 81))
Civil Bill Courts Procedure Amendment Act (Ireland) 1871 or the Civil Bill Courts Procedure Amendment (Ireland) Act 1871 (repealed)	34 & 35 Vict. c. 99	21 August 1871
An Act to amend the Procedure in the Civil Bill Courts in Ireland. (Repealed by Statute Law Revision Act 1883 (46 & 47 Vict. c. 39), Statute Law Revision (No. 2) Act 1893 (56 & 57 Vict. c. 54) and County Courts Act (Northern Ireland) 1959 (c. 25 (N.I.)))
Glebe Loan (Ireland) Amendment Act 1871 (repealed)	34 & 35 Vict. c. 100	21 August 1871
An Act to amend the Glebe Loan (Ireland) Act, 1870. (Note: Glebe Loan (Ireland) Act 1870 (33 & 34 Vict. c. 112)) (Repealed by Statute Law Revision Act 1883 (46 & 47 Vict. c. 39), Statute Law Revision (No. 2) Act 1893 (56 & 57 Vict. c. 54) and Statute Law Revision Act (Northern Ireland) 1954 (c. 35 (N.I.)))
Chain Cable and Anchor Act 1871 or the Chain Cables and Anchors Act 1871 (repealed)	34 & 35 Vict. c. 101	21 August 1871
An Act to amend the Law respecting the proving and sale of Chain Cables and Anchors. (Repealed by Anchors and Chain Cables Act 1899 (62 & 63 Vict. c. 23))
Charitable Donations and Bequests Act (Ireland) 1871 or the Charitable Donations and Bequests (Ireland) Act 1871 (repealed)	34 & 35 Vict. c. 102	21 August 1871
An Act to amend the Laws of Charitable Donations and Bequests in Ireland. (Repealed by Charities Act (Northern Ireland) 1964 (c. 33 (N.I.)))
House Tax Act 1871 (repealed)	34 & 35 Vict. c. 103	21 August 1871
An Act to amend the Law relating to the Customs and Inland Revenue. (Repealed by Finance Act 1924 (14 & 15 Geo. 5. c. 21))
Factory and Workshop Act 1871 (repealed)	34 & 35 Vict. c. 104	21 August 1871
An Act to amend the Acts relating to Factories and Workshops. (Repealed by Factory and Workshop Act 1878 (41 & 42 Vict. c. 16))
Petroleum Act 1871 (repealed)	34 & 35 Vict. c. 105	21 August 1871
An Act for the safe keeping of petroleum and other substances of a like nature. (Repealed for England and Wales and Scotland by Petroleum (Consolidation) Act 1928 (18 & 19 Geo. 5. c. 32) and for Northern Ireland by Petroleum (Consolidation) Act (Northern Ireland) 1929 (20 Geo. 5. c. 13 (N.I.)))
Detached Portions of Counties (Ireland) Act 1871 (repealed)	34 & 35 Vict. c. 106	21 August 1871
An Act to make provision for the separation from Counties in Ireland of detached and isolated portions of Land separated from the same by the Sea, and for the annexation of such Lands to Counties more conveniently situated for parliamentary, grand jury, and other purposes; and also to provide for the presentment of moneys by Grand Juries in certain cases. (Repealed by Rates (Northern Ireland) Order 1972 (SI 1972/1633 (N.I. 16)))
Leeward Islands Act 1871 (repealed)	34 & 35 Vict. c. 107	21 August 1871
An Act for the Federation and general Government of the Leeward Islands. (Repealed by Leeward Islands Act 1956 (4 & 5 Eliz. 2. c. 23))
Pauper Inmates Discharge and Regulation Act 1871 or the Pauper Inmates Discharge and Regulations Act 1871 (repealed)	34 & 35 Vict. c. 108	21 August 1871
An Act to regulate and control the Discharge of Paupers from Workhouses and Wards provided for the Casual Poor. (Repealed by Poor Law Act 1927 (17 & 18 Geo. 5. c. 14))
Local Government (Ireland) Act 1871 (repealed)	34 & 35 Vict. c. 109	21 August 1871
An Act to amend the Law relating to the Local Government of Towns and populous Places in Ireland. (Repealed by Local Government Act (Northern Ireland) 1972 (c. 9 (N.I.)) and Rates (Northern Ireland) Order 1972 (SI 1972/1633 (N.I. 16)))
Merchant Shipping Act 1871 (repealed)	34 & 35 Vict. c. 110	21 August 1871
An Act to amend the Merchant Shipping Acts. (Repealed by Merchant Shipping Act 1894 (57 & 58 Vict. c. 60))
Beerhouses (Ireland) Act (1864) Amendment Act 1871 (repealed)	34 & 35 Vict. c. 111	21 August 1871
An Act to amend the Beerhouses (Ireland) Act, 1864, (Note: Beerhouses (Ireland) Act 1864 (27 & 28 Vict. c. 35)) and for other purposes relating thereto. (Repealed by Licensing Act (Northern Ireland) 1971 (c. 13 (N.I.)))
Prevention of Crimes Act 1871	34 & 35 Vict. c. 112	21 August 1871
An Act for the more effectual Prevention of Crime.
Metropolis Water Act 1871	34 & 35 Vict. c. 113	21 August 1871
An act to amend "The Metropolis Water Act, 1852;" (Note: Metropolis Water Act 1852 (15 & 16 Vict. c. 84)) and to make further provision for the due Supply of Water to the Metropolis and certain places in the neighbourhood thereof.
Tramways (Ireland) Amendment Act 1871	34 & 35 Vict. c. 114	21 August 1871
An Act to amend the Tramways (Ireland) Acts, 1860 (Note: Tramways (Ireland) Act 1860 (23 & 24 Vict. c. 152)) and 1861. (Note: Tramways (Ireland) Amendment Act 1861 (24 & 25 Vict. c. 102))
Annual Turnpike Acts Continuance Act 1871 (repealed)	34 & 35 Vict. c. 115	21 August 1871
An Act to continue certain Turnpike Acts in Great Britain, to repeal certain other Turnpike Acts, and to make further provisions concerning Turnpike Roads. (Repealed by Statute Law (Repeals) Act 1981 (c. 19))
Statute Law Revision Act 1871	34 & 35 Vict. c. 116	21 August 1871
An Act for further promoting the Revision of the Statute Law by repealing certain Enactments which have ceased to be in force or have become unnecessary.
Tancred's Charities Act 1871 (repealed)	34 & 35 Vict. c. 117	21 August 1871
An Act for confirming a Scheme of the Charity Commissioners for the several Charities founded by the Settlement and Will of Christopher Tancred, of Whixley in the county of York, Esquire, deceased 21st August 1871. (Repealed by Statute Law (Repeals) Act 1981 (c. 19))
	Scheme for the application and management of certain Charities founded by the settlement of Christopher Tancred, of Whixley in the county of York, Esquire, deceased.	

=== Local acts ===
Short title	Citation	Royal assent
Long title
Local Government Supplemental Act 1871	34 & 35 Vict. c. i	25 May 1871
An Act to confirm certain Provisional Orders under "The Local Government Act, 1858," (Note: Local Government Act 1858 (21 & 22 Vict. c. 98)) relating to the districts of Barton, Eccles, Winton, and Monton, Bognor, Bolton (2), Burton-on-Trent, Chippenham, Chiswick, Derby, Harrogate (3), Kidderminster (2), Merthyr Tydfil, Northam, Ryde, Stroud, Trowbridge, and Worthing; and for other purposes relative to certain districts under the said Act.
	Barton, Eccles, Winton and Monton Order 1871 Provisional Order for altering the Order in Council applying the Public Health Act, 1848, (Note: Public Health Act 1848 (11 & 12 Vict. c. 63)) to the District of Barton, Eccles, Winton, and Monton in the County of Lancaster.	
	Bognor Order 1871 Provisional Order altering a Local Act (Note: Bognor Improvement Act 1835 (5 & 6 Will. 4. c. ci)) in force within the District of the Local Board of Bognor, in the County of Sussex.	
	Bolton (Lancashire) Order (1) 1871 Provisional Order empowering the Bolton Local Board of Health to put in force the Lands Clauses Consolidation Act, 1845, (Note: Lands Clauses Consolidation Act 1845 (8 & 9 Vict. c. 18)) for the Purchase of Lands by the said Board for Street Improvement and Sewage Outfall Works.	
	Bolton (Lancashire) Order (2) 1871 Provisional Order for extending the Borrowing Powers of the Bolton Local Board of Health.	
	Burton-upon-Trent Order 1871 Provisional Order for the Alteration of the Town of Burton-upon-Trent Act, 1853, (Note: Town of Burton-upon-Trent Act 1853 (16 & 17 Vict. c. cxviii)) in force within the District of the Burton-upon-Trent Local Board.	
	Chippenham Order 1871 Provisional Order for the Alteration and partial Repeal of a Local Act (Note: Chippenham Improvement Act 1834 (4 & 5 Will. 4. c. xlvii)) for lighting, watching, cleansing, paving, and otherwise improvement the town of Chippenham in the county of Wilts, in force within the district of the Chippenham Local Board.	
	Chiswick Order 1871 Provisional Order empowering the Chiswick Local Improvement Commissioners to put in force the Lands Clauses Consolidation Acts, for the Purchase of Lands by the said Commissioners for Main Sewerage and Sewage Outfall.	
	Derby Order 1871 Provisional Order putting in force the Lands Clauses Consolidation Act, 1845, within the District of the Derby Local Board of Health, for the Purchase of Lands by the said Board for Improvement of St. Peter's Street.	
	Harrogate Order (1) 1871 Provisional Order empowering the Harrogate Local Board to put in place the Lands Clauses Consolidation Act, 1845, for the Purchase of Lands by the said Board for the Storage of Mineral Waters.	
	Harrogate Order (2) 1871 Provisional Order for altering the Boundaries of the District of the Harrogate Improvement Commissioners, in the County of York, under the Provisions of the Local Government Act, 1858.	
	Harrogate Order (3) 1871 Provisional Order for extending the Borrowing Powers of the Harrogate Improvement Commissioners acting as the Local Board for the District of High and Low Harrogate.	
	Kidderminster Order (1) 1871 Provisional Order empowering the Kidderminster Local Board to put in force the Lands Clauses Consolidation Act, 1845, for the Purchase of Lands by the said Board for Sewage Irrigation.	
	Kidderminster Order (2) 1871 Provisional Order for extending the Borrowing Powers of the Kidderminster Local Board.	
	Merthyr Tydfil Order 1871 Provisional Order for extending the Borrowing Powers of the Merthyr Tydfil Local Board of Health.	
	Northam Order 1871 Provisional Order empowering the Northam Local Board to put in force the Lands Clauses Consolidation Act, 1845, for the Purchase of Lands by the said Board for Sewage Outfall Works.	
	Ryde Order 1871 Provisional Order for extending the Borrowing Powers of the Ryde Local Board.	
	Stroud Order 1871 Provisional Order for extending the Borrowing Powers of the Stroud Local Board of Health.	
	Trowbridge Order 1871 Provisional Order repealing and altering a Local Act (Note: Trowbridge Improvement Act 1799 (39 Geo. 3. c. xlvii)) in force within the District of the Trowbridge Local Board.	
	Worthing Order 1871 Provisional Order for extending the Borrowing Powers of the Worthing Local Board of Health.	
Oyster and Mussel Fisheries Order Confirmation Act 1871 (repealed)	34 & 35 Vict. c. ii	25 May 1871
An Act to confirm an Order made by the Board of Trade under The Sea Fisheries Act, 1868, (Note: Sea Fisheries Act 1868 (31 & 32 Vict. c. 45)) relating to the Frith of Forth. (Repealed by Statute Law (Repeals) Act 1998 (c. 43))
	Edinburgh Fishery Order 1871 Order for the establishment and maintenance by the Right Honourable the Lord Provost, Magistrates, and Council of the City of Edinburgh, of a Several Oyster and Mussel Fishery, in the Frith of Forth, in the counties of Fife and Edinburgh.	
City of London Court Act 1871 (repealed)	34 & 35 Vict. c. iii	25 May 1871
An Act for making better provision respecting the Fees to be taken in the city of London Court; and for other purposes. (Repealed by County Courts Act 1955 (4 & 5 Eliz. 2. c. 8))
South-eastern Railway Act 1871	34 & 35 Vict. c. iv	25 May 1871
An Act to enable the South-eastern Railway Company to complete their authorised Greenwich Line.
Union Bank of Australia Act 1871	34 & 35 Vict. c. v	25 May 1871
An Act to enable the Union Bank of Australia to sue and be sued in the name of a Public Officer; and for other purposes.
Ilkley Gas Act 1871	34 & 35 Vict. c. vi	25 May 1871
An Act to authorise the Ilkley Gas Company to make new works; and for other purposes.
Tower Subway (Capital) Act 1871	34 & 35 Vict. c. vii	25 May 1871
An Act to enable the Tower Subway Company to raise additional Capital.
Worcester Park Road Extension Act 1871	34 & 35 Vict. c. viii	25 May 1871
An Act to authorise the construction of a new Public Road in the parish of Malden in the county of Surrey; and for other purposes.
Louth Waterworks Act 1871	34 & 35 Vict. c. ix	25 May 1871
An Act for better supplying with Water the parish and borough of Louth and parish of Louth Park in the county of Lincoln.
Lancashire Union Railways Act 1871	34 & 35 Vict. c. x	25 May 1871
An Act for the abandonment of a portion of one of the authorised Railways of the Lancashire Union Railways Company; and for other purposes.
Great Western and Midland Railway Companies (Clifton and Bristol) Act 1871 or the Great Western and Midland Railways (Clifton and Bristol) Act 1871	34 & 35 Vict. c. xi	25 May 1871
An Act for transferring to the Great Western and the Midland Railway Companies the powers of the Bristol Port Railway and Pier Company with reference to a portion of their Clifton Extension, for authorising the construction of new junctions and the abandonment of authorised junctions near Bristol, for conferring powers of user of portions of the undertakings of the three Companies; and for other purposes.
North London Railway Act 1871	34 & 35 Vict. c. xii	25 May 1871
An Act for extending the time for the construction by the North London Railway Company of certain works connected with their railway; and for granting various additional powers to the Company.
Hylton, Southwick, and Monkwearmouth Railway Act 1871	34 & 35 Vict. c. xiii	25 May 1871
An Act for making a Railway from the Pontop and South Shields line of the North-eastern Railway to the Newcastle and Sunderland line of the same railway, in the county of Durham; and for other purposes.
Cradley Heath Gas Act 1871	34 & 35 Vict. c. xiv	25 May 1871
An Act for better supplying Cradley Heath in the county of Stafford, and other places, with Gas.
Sutton District Waterworks Act 1871	34 & 35 Vict. c. xv	25 May 1871
An Act for better supplying with water Sutton, Cheam, and other places in the county of Surrey.
Royal Exchange Assurance Act 1871 (repealed)	34 & 35 Vict. c. xvi	25 May 1871
An Act to repeal so much of an Act passed in the sixth year of the reign of King George the First (Note: Royal Exchange and London Assurance Corporation Act 1719 (6 Geo. 1. c. 18)) as restricts persons from being at the same time members of the Royal Exchange Assurance and of the London Assurance; and for other purposes. (Repealed by Royal Exchange Assurance Act 1901 (1 Edw. 7. c. x))
Shotts Iron Company's Act 1871 (repealed)	34 & 35 Vict. c. xvii	25 May 1871
An act to continue and incorporate the Shotts Iron Company, and to enable them to raise additional money; and for other purposes. (Repealed by Statute Law (Repeals) Act 2004 (c. 14))
Newport Pagnell Railway (Further Powers) Act 1871	34 & 35 Vict. c. xviii	25 May 1871
An Act to enable "The Newport Pagnell Railway Company" to construct a new railway to join "The Bedford and Northampton Railway."
Westhoughton Gas Act 1871	34 & 35 Vict. c. xix	25 May 1871
An Act for better supplying with Gas the township of Westhoughton and other places adjacent thereto in the county of Lancaster; and for other purposes.
Rhyl District Waterworks Act 1871	34 & 35 Vict. c. xx	25 May 1871
An Act to amend "The Rhyl District Waterworks Act, 1865;" (Note: Rhyl District Waterworks Act 1865 (28 & 29 Vict. c. cix)) to increase the capital of the Rhyl District Water Company; and for other purposes.
Lloyd's Act 1871	34 & 35 Vict. c. xxi	25 May 1871
An Act for incorporation the members of the Establishment or Society formerly held at Lloyd's Coffee House in the Royal Exchange in the city of London, for the effecting of Marine Insurance, and generally known as Lloyd's; and for other purposes.
St. John's Church, Bradford Act 1871	34 & 35 Vict. c. xxii	25 May 1871
An Act to authorise the building on a new site of the district parish church of Saint John the Evangelist in Bradford in the county of York, and the sale of the old church and churchyard; and for other purposes.
Huddersfield Waterworks Act 1871	34 & 35 Vict. c. xxiii	25 May 1871
An Act for authorising the construction by the Corporation of Huddersfield of additional Waterworks, and for carrying into effect arrangements between the Corporation and the Commissioners of the Wessenden Reservoir, and for extending the limits of and amending the Huddersfield Water Act, 1869; (Note: Huddersfield Water Act 1869 (32 & 33 Vict. c. cx)) and for other purposes.
Dunstable Gas and Water Act 1871	34 & 35 Vict. c. xxiv	25 May 1871
An Act incorporating the Dunstable Gas and Coke Company, and authorising them to supply Gas and Water to the town of Dunstable and its vicinity, in the county of Bedford.
Maryport and Carlisle Railway Act 1871	34 & 35 Vict. c. xxv	25 May 1871
An Act to enable the Maryport and Carlisle Railway Company to convert certain Preference Stocks in the Company into Ordinary Stock; to raise additional capital; and for other purposes.
Folkestone Waterworks Act 1871	34 & 35 Vict. c. xxvi	25 May 1871
An Act to enlarge the powers of "The Folkestone Waterworks Company."
Dublin, Rathmines, &c. Railway (Extension of Time) Act 1871	34 & 35 Vict. c. xxvii	25 May 1871
An Act to extend the powers of "The Dublin, Rathmines, Rathgar, Roundtown, Rathfarnham, and Rathcoole Railway Company" for the taking of lands and for the completion of their undertaking; and for other purposes.
Boston Gas Act 1871	34 & 35 Vict. c. xxviii	25 May 1871
An Act to amend "The Boston Gas Amendment Act, 1856," (Note: Boston Gas Amendment Act 1856 (19 & 20 Vict. c. xxiii)) and to enable the Boston Gaslight and Coke Company to raise more money; and for other purposes.
Cork Harbour and Curraghbinny Railway Act 1871	34 & 35 Vict. c. xxix	25 May 1871
An Act for making a Railway from Raffeen Creek, in the county of Cork, to Curraghbinny, in the same county, to be called "The Cork Harbour and Curraghbinny Railway;" and for other purposes.
Cambridge University and Town Waterworks Act 1871	34 & 35 Vict. c. xxx	25 May 1871
An Act to enable the Cambridge University and Town Waterworks Company to acquire additional lands; and to repeal some of the provisions of one of their existing Acts; (Note: Cambridge University and Town Waterworks Act 1866 (29 & 30 Vict. c. lxxxi)) and for other purposes.
Albert Life Assurance Company Arbitration Act 1871	34 & 35 Vict. c. xxxi	25 May 1871
An Act to effect a settlement of the affairs of "The Albert Life Assurance Company" by arbitration; and for other purposes.
Clayhithe Bridge Act 1871	34 & 35 Vict. c. xxxii	25 May 1871
An Act to authorise the construction of a Bridge over the River Cam in the county of Cambridge, to be called "the Clayhithe Bridge," with Approaches; and for other purposes.
East Cornwall Mineral Railway (Deviation) Act 1871	34 & 35 Vict. c. xxxiii	25 May 1871
An Act to enable the East Cornwall Mineral Railway Company to divert a portion of their Railway; and for other purposes.
Stamford Inclosure Act 1871	34 & 35 Vict. c. xxxiv	25 May 1871
An Act to inclose certain open Fields, Meadows, and Waste Lands in and near the Borough of Stamford; and to provide a Recreation Ground; and for quieting the titles with respect to certain Encroachments; and for other purposes.
Glasgow Corporation Gas Act 1871 (repealed)	34 & 35 Vict. c. xxxv	25 May 1871
An Act for conferring further powers on the Corporation of the city of Glasgow in relation to their Gas Undertaking; and for other purposes. (Repealed by Glasgow Gas Act 1910 (10 Edw. 7 & 1 Geo. 5. c. cxxxi))
Glasgow Markets and Slaughter-houses Act 1871 (repealed)	34 & 35 Vict. c. xxxvi	25 May 1871
An Act to authorise the Commissioners for executing and carrying into effect "The Glasgow Market and Slaughter-houses Act, 1865," (Note: Glasgow Markets and Slaughterhouses Act 1865 (28 & 29 Vict. c. lxiii)) to raise a further sum of money; and for other purposes. (Repealed by Glasgow Corporation Consolidation (Water, Transport and Markets) Order Confirmation Act 1964 (c. xliii))
Great Northern and Western (of Ireland) Railway Act 1871	34 & 35 Vict. c. xxxvii	25 May 1871
An Act to enable the Great Northern and Western (of Ireland) Railway Company to extend their Railway to Ballina; and for other purposes.
Macclesfield, Bollington, and Marple Committee Act 1871	34 & 35 Vict. c. xxxviii	25 May 1871
An Act for dissolving the Macclesfield, Bollington, and Marple Railway Company, and for transferring their undertaking to the Manchester, Sheffield, and Lincolnshire and North Staffordshire Railway Companies jointly; and for other purposes.
Manchester, Sheffield, and Lincolnshire Railway Company and Cheshire Lines Committee Act 1871	34 & 35 Vict. c. xxxix	25 May 1871
An Act for conferring various powers on the Manchester, Sheffield, and Lincolnshire Railway Company, the Great Northern Railway Company, the Midland Railway Company, and the Cheshire Lines Committee; and for other purposes.
Batley Corporation Waterworks Act 1871	34 & 35 Vict. c. xl	16 June 1871
An Act to make better provision for the Supply of Water to the Borough of Batley in the West Riding of the County of York, and to authorise the construction of Waterworks by the Corporation of that Borough, and the sale of their share in the Dewsbury, Batley, and Heckmondwike Waterworks; and for other purposes.
Belfast Harbour Commissioners Act 1871	34 & 35 Vict. c. xli	16 June 1871
An Act to explain and amend certain enactments contained in the Commissioners Clauses Act, 1847, (Note: Commissioners Clauses Act 1847 (10 & 11 Vict. c. 16)) incorporated with the Belfast Harbour Act, 1847, (Note: Belfast Harbour Act 1847 (10 & 11 Vict. c. lii)) and for other purposes.
Ross and Monmouth Railway Act 1871	34 & 35 Vict. c. xlii	16 June 1871
An Act to authorise the Ross and Monmouth Railway Company to attach a preferential dividend to a portion of their share capital.
Muswell Hill Estate and Railways Act 1871	34 & 35 Vict. c. xliii	16 June 1871
An Act to abandon one of the railways authorised by "The Muswell Hill Estate and Railways Act, 1866," (Note: Muswell Hill Estate and Railways Act 1866 (29 & 30 Vict. c. ccxc)) and part of another of the said railways; and to extend the time for the purchase of land and for the construction of so much of the said railways as are not to be abandoned; and for other purposes.
Greenock Police, Improvement, and Gas Act 1871	34 & 35 Vict. c. xliv	16 June 1871
An Act for amending the Acts relating to the Police and Improvement of the town of Greenock, and for vesting the existing Gasworks there in the Board of Police of the town, and for authorising the Board to make new Gasworks; and for other purposes.
Ilkley Local Board Act 1871	34 & 35 Vict. c. xlv	16 June 1871
An Act to confirm the purchase of the undertaking of the Ilkley Waterworks Company, and to authorise the construction of new Waterworks by the Local Board for the township of Ilkley, and to authorise the said Local Board to provide a Recreation Ground; and for other purposes.
Swansea and Carmarthen Railways Act 1871	34 & 35 Vict. c. xlvi	16 June 1871
An Act to vest the Swansea and Carmarthen Lines Undertakings of the Llanelly Railway and Dock Company in a new Company, and to confer powers upon both the said Companies with reference to their respective undertakings; and for other purposes.
Metropolitan Railway Act 1871	34 & 35 Vict. c. xlvii	16 June 1871
An Act to grant further powers to the Metropolitan Railway Company.
Scotswood, Newburn, and Wylam Railway and Dock Act 1871	34 & 35 Vict. c. xlviii	16 June 1871
An Act to authorise the construction of Railways and Dock in the county of Northumberland, to be called "The Scotswood, Newburn, and Wylam Railway and Dock."
Wye Valley Railway Amendment Act 1871	34 & 35 Vict. c. xlix	16 June 1871
An Act to extend the time granted to the Wye Valley Railway Company for the construction of their railway.
Hailsham Cattle Market Act 1871	34 & 35 Vict. c. l	16 June 1871
An Act for dissolving the Hailsham Cattle Market Company, Limited, and re-incorporating the proprietors therein for continuing and holding a cattle market in the parish of Hailsham in the county of Sussex; and for other purposes.
Bromsgrove Waterworks Act 1871 (repealed)	34 & 35 Vict. c. li	16 June 1871
An Act to extend the time for constructing the Works of the Bromsgrove and Droitwich Waterworks Company, to reduce the capital of that Company, and to enable them to abandon a portion of their authorised undertaking. (Repealed by Statute Law (Repeals) Act 1998 (c. 43))
Macclesfield and Knutsford Railway Act 1871	34 & 35 Vict. c. lii	16 June 1871
An Act to revive and extend the powers the Macclesfield, Knutsford, and Warrington Railway Company for the purchase of lands, and for the construction of their railway between Macclesfield and Knutsford.
Warrington Gas Act 1871	34 & 35 Vict. c. liii	16 June 1871
An Act for the granting of further powers to the Warrington Gaslight and Coke Company.
Leadenhall Market Act 1871 (repealed)	34 & 35 Vict. c. liv	16 June 1871
An Act for the extension of Leadenhall Market in the city of London, and for the regulation thereof; and for other purposes. (Repealed by Statute Law (Repeals) Act 2008 (c. 12))
Billingsgate Market Act 1871	34 & 35 Vict. c. lv	16 June 1871
An Act for the extension of Billingsgate Market in the city of London; and for other purposes.
Yarmouth and Ventnor Railway, Tramway, and Pier Act 1871	34 & 35 Vict. c. lvi	16 June 1871
An Act for making a Railway from Yarmouth to Ventnor in the Isle of Wight, and a Tramway and Pier or Jetty at Yarmouth; and for other purposes.
Metropolitan Commons Supplemental Act 1871 or the Metropolitan Commons Supplemental Blackheath Scheme Act 1871	34 & 35 Vict. c. lvii	29 June 1871
An Act to confirm a scheme under "The Metropolitan Commons Act, 1866," (Note: Metropolitan Commons Act 1866 (29 & 30 Vict. c. 122)) relating to Blackheath.
	Scheme with respect to Blackheath.	
Pier and Harbour Orders Confirmation Act 1871 (No. 1) or the Pier and Harbour Orders Confirmation (No. 1) Act 1871	34 & 35 Vict. c. lviii	29 June 1871
An Act for confirming certain Provisional Orders made by the Board of Trade under The General Pier and Harbour Act, 1861, (Note: General Pier and Harbour Act 1861 (24 & 25 Vict. c. 45)) relating to Curran, Hastings, Herne Bay, Hornsea, Northam, and Stornoway.
	Curran Pier and Harbour Order 1871 Order for the maintenance and regulation of the Pier and Harbour of Curran in the parish of Larne in the county of Antrim.	
	Hastings Pier Order 1871 Order for extending the time for completion of the Pier and Works authorised by The Hastings Pier Act, 1867. (Note: Hastings Pier Act 1867 (30 & 31 Vict. c. clxxxvii))	
	Herne Bay Promenade Pier Order 1871 Order for the construction, maintenance, and regulation of a Pier and other Works at Herne Bay in the County of Kent.	
	Hornsea Pier Order 1871 Order for extending the time for completion of the works authorised by "The Hornsea Pier Order, 1866."	
	Northam Pier Order 1871 Order for extending the time for completion of the works authorised by "The Northam Pier Order, 1865."	
	Stornoway Harbour Order 1871 Order for amending "The Stornoway Harbour Order, 1865."	
Local Government Supplemental Act 1871 (No. 2) or the Local Government Supplemental (No. 2) Act 1871	34 & 35 Vict. c. lix	29 June 1871
An Act to confirm certain Provisional Orders under "The Local Government Act, 1858," relating to the districts of Dawlish, Kingston-upon-Hull, Morley, Nelson, Sheerness, Skipton (2), Todmorden, West Derby, Willenhall, and York; and for other purposes relative to certain districts under the said Act.
	Dawlish Order 1871 Provisional Order putting in force the Lands Clauses Consolidation Act, 1845, within the district of the Dawlish Local Board, for the Purchase of Lands by the said Board for Purposes of Street Improvements.	
	Kingston-upon-Hull Order 1871 Provisional Order for the repeal and alteration of parts of Local Acts within the District of the Kingston-upon-Hull Local Board of Health.	
	Morley Order 1871 Provisional Order for extending the Borrowing Powers of the Morley Local Board.	
	Nelson Order 1871 Provisional Order altering parts of a Local Act (Note: Nelson Water and Gas Act 1866 (29 & 30 Vict. c. lxxvi)) in force within the District of the Nelson Local Board.	
	Sheerness Order 1871 Provisional Order for extending the Borrowing Powers of the Sheerness Local Board of Health.	
	Skipton Order (1) 1871 Provisional Order for extending the Borrowing Powers of the Skipton Local Board of Health.	
	Skipton Order (2) 1871 Provisional Order putting in force the Lands Clauses Consolidation Act, 1845, without the district of the Skipton Local Board of Health, for the purchase of lands by the said Board for purposes of Sewage Irrigation.	
	Todmorden Order 1871 Provisional Order putting in force the Lands Clauses Consolidation Act, 1845, within the District of Todmorden Local Board, for the Purchase of Land by the said Board for the purpose of erecting a Market House.	
	West Derby Order 1871 Provisional Order putting in force the Lands Clauses Consolidation Act, 1845, within the District of the West Derby Local Board, for the Purchase of Lands by the said Board for purposes of Sewage Irrigation.	
	Willenhall Order 1871 Provisional Order for altering the Boundaries of the District of Willenhall, in the County of Stafford, as constituted for the purposes of the Public Health Act, 1848.	
	York Order 1871 Provisional Order putting in force the Lands Clauses Consolidation Act, 1845, within the district of the York Local Board of Health, for the purchase of lands by the said Board for Street Improvements.	
Land Drainage Supplemental Act 1871 (repealed)	34 & 35 Vict. c. lx	29 June 1871
An Act to confirm certain Provisional Orders under "The Land Drainage Act, 1861." (Note: Land Drainage Act 1861 (24 & 25 Vict. c. 133)) (Repealed by Statute Law (Repeals) Act 1993 (c. 50))
	In the matter of Digby Improvement, situate in the Parishes of Digby, Billinghay, Walcot, and Timberland Thorpe, otherwise Thorpe Tilney, in the County of Lincoln.	
	In the matter of Bourn South Fen Improvement, situate in the Parish of Bourn in the County of Lincoln.	
Poor Law Board's Provisional Orders Confirmation Act 1871	34 & 35 Vict. c. lxi	29 June 1871
An Act to confirm two Provisional Orders made by the Poor Law Board under the Poor Law Amendment Act, 1867, (Note: Poor Law Amendment Act 1867 (30 & 31 Vict. c. 106)) with reference to the parishes of Shipton Oliffe and Shipton Sollars in the county of Gloucester and to the parish of Dalton in the county of Lancaster.
	Northleach Union Order 1871 Northleach Union. Shipton Oliffe and Shipton Sollars Parishes.	
	Ulverston Union Order 1871 Ulverstone Union. Parish of Dalton.	
Drainage and Improvement of Lands Supplemental Act (Ireland) 1871 or the Drainage and Improvement of Lands Supplemental (Ireland) Act 1871	34 & 35 Vict. c. lxii	29 June 1871
An Act to confirm Provisional Orders under "The Drainage and Improvement of Lands (Ireland) Act, 1863," (Note: Drainage and Improvement of Lands (Ireland) Act 1863 (26 & 27 Vict. c. 88)) and the Acts amending the same.
	Derrinlough Drainage District Order 1871 In the matter of The Derringlough Drainage District, in the King's County.	
	Baltracey River Drainage District Order 1871 In the matter of "The Baltracey River Drainage District," in the county of Kildare.	
Metropolitan Commons Second Supplemental Act 1871	34 & 35 Vict. c. lxiii	29 June 1871
An Act to confirm a scheme (Shepherd's Bush) under "The Metropolitan Commons Act, 1866."
	Scheme with respect to Shepherd's Bush Common.	
Lancashire and Yorkshire and London and North-western Railways (Blackpool and Lytham Railway, &c.) Act 1871	34 & 35 Vict. c. lxiv	29 June 1871
An Act for amalgamating the Blackpool and Lytham Railway with the Preston and Wyre Railway, Harbour, and Dock Undertaking of the Lancashire and Yorkshire and London and North-western Railway Companies; and for conferring upon those Companies further powers in connexion with the said Undertaking; and for other purposes.
Manchester Improvement Act 1871	34 & 35 Vict. c. lxv	29 June 1871
An Act for enabling the mayor, aldermen, and citizens of the city of Manchester in the county of Lancaster to acquire additional lands; to raise further moneys; and for other purposes.
Chorley Improvement Act 1871	34 & 35 Vict. c. lxvi	29 June 1871
An Act to enable the Chorley Commissioners to obtain further lands for the Utilization of Sewage, and to make Sewerage Works; to erect a new Cattle Market and new Gasworks; to purchase the existing Market and Gasworks; to erect a new Town Hall and Public Buildings; to widen Streets; and to amend the Chorley Improvement Act, 1853; (Note: Chorley Improvement Act 1853 (16 & 17 Vict. c. clxxxi)) and for other purposes.
Kington and Eardisley Railway Act 1871	34 & 35 Vict. c. lxvii	29 June 1871
An Act to revive and extend the powers for the compulsory purchase of certain lands, and to extend the time for the completion of the deviation railways authorised by the "Kington and Eardisley Railway Act, 1868," (Note: Kington and Eardisley Railway Act 1868 (31 & 32 Vict. c. cvii)) and to abandon a certain branch railway, and to enable the holders of mortgages and debentures to vote at meetings of the Company; and for other purposes.
Sidmouth Railway Act 1871	34 & 35 Vict. c. lxviii	29 June 1871
An Act to authorise the construction of a Railway in Devonshire, to be called "The Sidmouth Railway;" and for other purposes.
Midland Great Western Railway of Ireland Act 1871 (repealed)	34 & 35 Vict. c. lxix	29 June 1871
An Act to enable the Midland Great Western Railway of Ireland Company to make a Branch Railway and to acquire additional lands. (Repealed by Statute Law (Repeals) Act 2013 (c. 2))
Fleetwood Docks Act 1871	34 & 35 Vict. c. lxx	29 June 1871
An Act to revive and extend the powers granted by "The Fleetwood Docks Act, 1864" (Note: Fleetwood Docks Act 1864 (27 & 28 Vict. c. clxxxvii)) and to enable the Lancashire and Yorkshire Railway Company to exercise those powers; and for other purposes.
Kilmarnock Municipal Extension and Improvement Act 1871	34 & 35 Vict. c. lxxi	29 June 1871
An Act for extending the Boundaries of the Burgh of Kilmarnock for municipal and police purposes; for regulating the Wards and the Election of the Provost, Magistrates, and Town Council within the extended boundary; for transferring to the Corporation the Property and Powers of the Town Improvement Trustees and of the Commissioners of Police of Kilmarnock, and for the extinction of those bodies; for constituting a Dean of Guild Court for the Burgh; for transferring to and vesting in the Corporation the Undertaking of the Kilmarnock Gas Company; for authorising the Corporation to purchase the Waterworks of the Kilmarnock Water Company; to construct Waterworks and supply with Gas and Water the Burgh and adjacent districts; to construct new Streets and improve existing Streets; to provide a public Park and make arrangements with the Trustees of the late Alexander Kay; for defining and extending the Powers of the Corporation; and for other purposes.
Merionethshire Railway Act 1871 (repealed)	34 & 35 Vict. c. lxxii	29 June 1871
An Act for making a Railway from Festiniog in the county of Merioneth to the railway of the Cambrian Railways Company, in the parish of Llandecwyn in the same county; and for other purposes. (Repealed by Merionethshire Railway (Abandonment) Act 1887 (50 & 51 Vict. c. cviii))
Albert Bridge Act 1871 (repealed)	34 & 35 Vict. c. lxxiii	29 June 1871
An Act to continue and enlarge the powers of the Acts relating to the Albert Bridge Company; and for other purposes. (Repealed by Local Law (Greater London Council and Inner London Boroughs) Order 1965 (SI 1965/540))
Glasgow Improvements Act 1871	34 & 35 Vict. c. lxxiv	29 June 1871
An Act for extending the time limited for Compulsory Purchase of Lands by the Glasgow Improvements Act, 1866; (Note: Glasgow Improvements Act 1866 (29 & 30 Vict. c. lxxxv)) and for other purposes.
Gas Light and Coke Company's Act 1871	34 & 35 Vict. c. lxxv	29 June 1871
An Act for authorising the Gaslight and Coke Company to make a short connecting Railway from the Company's works at Beckton to the Great Eastern Railway; and for amalgamating the Equitable Gaslight Company with the Gaslight and Coke Company; and for amending the Metropolis Gas Act, 1860, (Note: Metropolis Gas Act 1860 (23 & 24 Vict. c. 125)) and the City of London Gas Act, 1868; (Note: City of London Gas Act 1868 (31 & 32 Vict. c. cxxv)) and for other purposes.
Glasgow and South-western Railway Act 1871	34 & 35 Vict. c. lxxvi	29 June 1871
An Act to enable the Glasgow and South-western Railway Company to abandon the construction of an authorised junction, and to acquire the undertaking of the Ayr and Maybole Junction Railway Company; and for other purposes.
Hampstead Heath Act 1871	34 & 35 Vict. c. lxxvii	29 June 1871
An Act for effecting a transfer to the Metropolitan Board of Works of the open space known as Hampstead Heath, and for enabling them to preserve, improve, and regulate the same; and for other purposes.
Perth Gas Act 1871	34 & 35 Vict. c. lxxviii	29 June 1871
An Act to authorise and incorporate Commissioners to supply with gas the Royal Burgh of Perth, and districts and places adjacent, and to transfer to and vest in the said Commissioners the undertakings of the Perth Gaslight Company and the Perth New Gaslight Company; and for other purposes.
Sheffield Improvement Act 1871 (repealed)	34 & 35 Vict. c. lxxix	29 June 1871
An Act for extending the powers of the Corporation of Sheffield in relation to certain matters of Police, and to increase the number of Councillors and Aldermen, and for other purposes. (Repealed by Sheffield Corporation (Consolidation) Act 1918 (8 & 9 Geo. 5. c. lxi))
Sheppy Gas Act 1871	34 & 35 Vict. c. lxxx	29 June 1871
An Act for dissolving the Sheppy Gas Consumers Company, Limited, and re-incorporating the proprietors therein with others; for more effectually supplying with gas Sheerness and other parishes, townships, and places, all in the Isle of Sheppy in the county of Kent; and for other purposes.
East and West Junction Railway (Extension of Time) Act 1871	34 & 35 Vict. c. lxxxi	29 June 1871
An Act to extend the time for the completion of the East and West Junction Railway.
Pontypool, Caerleon, and Newport Railway Act 1871	34 & 35 Vict. c. lxxxii	29 June 1871
An Act to enlarge the powers of the Pontypool, Caerleon, and Newport Railway Company; and for other purposes.
Lambeth Waterworks Act 1871	34 & 35 Vict. c. lxxxiii	29 June 1871
An Act for empowering the Company of Proprietors of Lambeth Waterworks to execute further works, and for extending the limits within which they are authorised to supply water; and for other purposes.
Cleveland Waterworks Act 1871	34 & 35 Vict. c. lxxxiv	29 June 1871
An Act to extend the limits within which the Cleveland Water Company may supply water, and for empowering them to construct additional works and to raise additional capital; and for other purposes.
Scarborough and Whitby Railway Act 1871	34 & 35 Vict. c. lxxxv	29 June 1871
An Act to authorise the making of a Railway from Scarborough to Whitby in the north riding of the county of York; and for other purposes.
Midland Railway (Additional Powers) Act 1871	34 & 35 Vict. c. lxxxvi	29 June 1871
An Act for conferring additional powers on the Midland Railway Company for the Construction of Works, and for the raising of further capital, and for other purposes in relation to their own undertaking and the undertakings of other companies.
Wicklow Copper Mine Company's Act 1871	34 & 35 Vict. c. lxxxvii	29 June 1871
An Act to extend the powers of the Wicklow Copper Mine Company; and for other purposes.
Dublin Tramways Act 1871	34 & 35 Vict. c. lxxxviii	29 June 1871
An Act to authorise the construction of Tramways in and near the city of Dublin; and for other purposes.
Edinburgh Tramways Act 1871 (repealed)	34 & 35 Vict. c. lxxxix	29 June 1871
An Act to authorise the construction of Street Tramways in certain parts of Edinburgh, Leith, and Portobello; and for other purposes. (Repealed by Edinburgh Corporation Order Confirmation Act 1932 (22 & 23 Geo. 5. c. vii))
Staffordshire Potteries Stipendiary Justice Act 1871 (repealed)	34 & 35 Vict. c. xc	29 June 1871
An Act to amend "The Staffordshire Potteries Stipendiary Justice Act, 1839;" (Note: Staffordshire Potteries Stipendiary Justice Act 1839 (2 & 3 Vict. c. 15)) and for other purposes. (Repealed by Justices of the Peace Act 1968 (c. 69))
Whitehaven Dock and Railways Act 1871	34 & 35 Vict. c. xci	29 June 1871
An Act to enable the Trustees of the port, harbour, and town of Whitehaven to make a Wet Dock at Whitehaven, with railway approaches thereto; and for other purposes.
Abergavenny Improvement Act 1871	34 & 35 Vict. c. xcii	29 June 1871
An Act for amending the Abergavenny Improvement Act, 1860; (Note: Abergavenny Improvement Act 1860 (23 & 24 Vict. c. cxxxvii)) and for other purposes.
Arbroath Corporation Gas Act 1871	34 & 35 Vict. c. xciii	29 June 1871
An Act to authorise the Corporation of Arbroath to supply with Gas the town of Arbroath, and to transfer to and vest in them the undertaking of the Arbroath Gaslight Company; and for other purposes.
Bradford Corporation Gas and Improvement Act 1871 or the Bradford Corporation Gas Act 1871	34 & 35 Vict. c. xciv	29 June 1871
An Act to authorise and empower the Mayor, Aldermen, and Burgesses of the borough of Bradford in the west riding of the county of York to purchase the Undertaking of the Bradford Gaslight Company; to enable the Company to sell the same; to take Lands for defecating the sewage of the borough; and for other purposes.
Greenock Street Tramways Act 1871	34 & 35 Vict. c. xcv	29 June 1871
An Act for authorising the construction of Street Tramways in the town of Greenock; and for other purposes.
Minehead Railway Act 1871	34 & 35 Vict. c. xcvi	29 June 1871
An Act for making a Railway from the West Somerset Railway at Watchet to Minehead in the county of Somerset; and for other purposes.
Pier and Harbour Orders Confirmation Act 1871 (No. 2) or the Pier and Harbour Orders Confirmation (No. 2) Act 1871	34 & 35 Vict. c. xcvii	13 July 1871
An Act for confirming certain Provisional Orders made by the Board of Trade under The General Pier and Harbour Act, 1861, relating to Coatham, Hythe (Southampton), Johnshaven, Newlyn, Redcar, and Cork.
	Coatham Victoria Pier Order 1871 Order for the construction, maintenance, and regulation of a Pier at East Coatham in the North Riding of the County of York.	
	Hythe Pier Order 1871 Order for the construction, maintenance, and regulation of a Pier at Hythe in the County of Southampton.	
	Johnshaven Harbour Order 1871 Order for the improvement, maintenance, and regulation of the Harbour of Johnshaven in the county of Kincardine.	
	Newlyn Pier and Harbour Order 1871 Order for extending the time for completion of Works; and for amending "The Newlyn Pier and Harbour Order, 1866."	
	Redcar Pier Order 1871 Order for amending The Redcar Pier Order, 1866.	
	Cork Harbour Order 1871 Order for the maintenance and regulation of the Harbour and Port of Cork.	
Aberdeen Harbour Act 1871	34 & 35 Vict. c. xcviii	13 July 1871
An Act to confer further powers on the Aberdeen Harbour Commissioners.
Sutherland and Caithness Railway Act 1871	34 & 35 Vict. c. xcix	13 July 1871
An Act for making a Railway from Helmsdale in the county of Sutherland to Wick in the county of Caithness, with a Branch to Thurso, to be called "The Sutherland and Caithness Railway;" and for other purposes.
Ince Water Act 1871	34 & 35 Vict. c. c	13 July 1871
An Act to enable the Local Board for the district of Ince in Makerfield to provide a supply of Water for the district and its neighbourhood; and for other purposes.
Bristol and Exeter Railway Act 1871	34 & 35 Vict. c. ci	13 July 1871
An Act to confer further Powers upon the Bristol and Exeter Railway Company; and for other purposes.
Forfar Gas Act 1871	34 & 35 Vict. c. cii	13 July 1871
An Act to authorise the Magistrates and Town Council of Forfar to supply with Gas the town of Forfar and districts and places adjacent, and to transfer to them the Works and Undertaking of The Forfar Gaslight Company; and for other purposes.
Great Southern and Western Railway and Cork and Limerick Direct Railway Transfer Act 1871	34 & 35 Vict. c. ciii	13 July 1871
An Act for vesting the Undertaking of the Cork and Limerick Direct Railway Company in the Great Southern and Western Railway Company; and for other purposes.
Humber Conservancy Act 1871	34 & 35 Vict. c. civ	13 July 1871
An Act for confirming agreements made by the Humber Conservancy Commissioners respecting Lands in the Rivers Humber, Ouse, and Trent, and for conferring various powers on the Commissioners; and for other purposes.
Kidsgrove Gaslight Act 1871	34 & 35 Vict. c. cv	13 July 1871
An Act for incorporating the Kidsgrove Gaslight Company and extending their powers; and for authorising additional Works and the raising of further Moneys; and for other purposes.
North British Railway Act 1871	34 & 35 Vict. c. cvi	13 July 1871
An Act to authorise the North British Railway Company to make certain Deviations in the Railways and Works comprised in their Stobcross Undertaking, and to execute other Works; and to make provision with respect to the Sale of superfluous Lands; and for the consolidation of certain Ordinary and Debenture Stocks of the North British Railway Company; and for the Amalgamation with that Company of the Esk Valley Railway Company; and to authorise the raising of Money for the purposes of the Devon Valley Railway; and for other purposes.
Solicitors in the Supreme Courts of Scotland Act 1871	34 & 35 Vict. c. cvii	13 July 1871
An Act for confirming and amending the Charter of, and re-incorporating, the Society of Solicitors in the Supreme Courts of Scotland; extending and defining its Rights and Privileges; raising and securing a Fund for the Widows and Children of Members; and other purposes.
Vale of Clyde Tramways Act 1871 (repealed)	34 & 35 Vict. c. cviii	13 July 1871
An Act to authorise the construction of Tramways from Glasgow to Paisley, Johnstone, and Govan, and from Port Glasgow to Greenock and Gourock; and for other purposes. (Repealed by Glasgow Corporation Consolidation (Water, Transport and Markets) Order Confirmation Act 1964 (c. xliii))
Dundee Water Extension Act 1871 (repealed)	34 & 35 Vict. c. cix	13 July 1871
An Act for making additional provision for the Supply of Water to the Burgh of Dundee and Suburbs thereof, and places adjacent; and for amending and extending the Acts relating to such supply; and for other purposes. (Repealed by Dundee Corporation (Water, Transport, Finance, &c.) Order Confirmation Act 1954 (2 & 3 Eliz. 2. c. ix))
Salford Improvement Act 1871	34 & 35 Vict. c. cx	13 July 1871
An Act to confer additional powers upon the Corporation of Salford in reference to the Drainage and Improvement of the Borough; and for other purposes.
Brecon and Merthyr Railway Act 1871	34 & 35 Vict. c. cxi	13 July 1871
An Act to grant further powers to "The Brecon and Merthyr Tydfil Junction Railway Company."
Great Western Railway (Steam Vessels) Act 1871	34 & 35 Vict. c. cxii	13 July 1871
An Act for empowering the Great Western Railway Company to provide and use Steam and other Vessels; and for other purposes.
Cefn, Acrefair, and Rhosymedre Water (Amendment) Act 1871 (repealed)	34 & 35 Vict. c. cxiii	13 July 1871
An Act for amending the Cefn, Acrefair, and Rhosymedre Water Act, 1866. (Note: Cefn, Acrefair and Rhosymedre Water Act 1866 (29 & 30 Vict. c. cxlix)) (Repealed by Wrexham and East Denbighshire Water (No. 2) Order 1953 (SI 1953/1449))
London and North-western Railway (Additional Powers) Act 1871	34 & 35 Vict. c. cxiv	13 July 1871
An Act for conferring further powers on the London and North-western Railway Company for the construction of Works and otherwise, and also to sanction the construction of a Road by the Mold and Denbigh Junction Railway Company; and for other purposes.
Mitcheldean Road and Forest of Dean Junction Railway Act 1871	34 & 35 Vict. c. cxv	13 July 1871
An Act for making a Railway from the Hereford, Ross, and Gloucester Railway, at Mitcheldean Road, to the Whimsey Branch of the Forest of Dean Railway; and other purposes.
North-eastern Railway Company's Act 1871 or the North Eastern Railway Act 1871	34 & 35 Vict. c. cxvi	13 July 1871
An Act for enabling the North-eastern Railway Company to construct Railways and other Works in the counties of York, Northumberland, and Durham, and in the borough and county of Newcastle-upon-Tyne; and for other purposes.
Aldborough Railway Act 1871	34 & 35 Vict. c. cxvii	13 July 1871
An Act to amend the Aldborough Pier and Railway Act, 1864, (Note: Aldborough Pier and Railway Act 1864 (27 & 28 Vict. c. cccxxvi)) and to authorise the formation of a Railway in substitution for the Railway authorised by that Act.
Chesterfield Waterworks and Gaslight Company's Act 1871 (repealed)	34 & 35 Vict. c. cxviii	13 July 1871
An Act to grant further powers to "The Chesterfield Waterworks and Gaslight Company." (Repealed by Chesterfield Corporation Act 1923 (13 & 14 Geo. 5. c. xcix))
South Lancashire Waterworks Act 1871 (repealed)	34 & 35 Vict. c. cxix	13 July 1871
An Act for incorporating the South Lancashire Waterworks Company, and for authorising them to construct Works for better supplying with Water certain townships and places in the county of Lancaster; and for other purposes. (Repealed by Leigh Corporation Act 1903 (3 Edw. 7. c. cxxiv))
Margate Pier and Harbour Act 1871 (repealed)	34 & 35 Vict. c. cxx	13 July 1871
An Act to authorise the Company of Proprietors of Margate Pier and Harbour to extend and enlarge their High-Water Landing Pier or Jetty at Margate in the county of Kent, and to raise further Capital; and to enlarge the powers of the Company; and for other purposes. (Repealed by Margate Pier and Harbour Revision Order 1992 (SI 1993/1313))
Wharves and Warehouses Steam Power and Hydraulic Pressure Company's Act 1871	34 & 35 Vict. c. cxxi	13 July 1871
An Act for the incorporation of the Wharves and Warehouses Steam Power and Hydraulic Pressure Company; and for other purposes.
Bethlem Hospital Act 1871 (repealed)	34 & 35 Vict. c. cxxii	13 July 1871
An Act to enable the Governors of Bethlem Hospital to establish and maintain at Witley in the parish of Godalming in the county of Surrey a Convalescent Establishment in connexion with and as part of Bethlem Hospital. (Repealed by Statute Law (Repeals) Act 2013 (c. 2))
North British, Arbroath, and Montrose Railway Act 1871	34 & 35 Vict. c. cxxiii	13 July 1871
An Act to authorise the Construction of the North British, Arbroath, and Montrose Railway.
Richmond (Surrey) Sewage Act 1871	34 & 35 Vict. c. cxxiv	13 July 1871
An Act for conferring further powers upon the Vestry of the parish of Richmond in the county of Surrey in relation to Sewage; and for other purposes.
Finn Valley Railway Act 1871	34 & 35 Vict. c. cxxv	13 July 1871
An Act to grant further powers to the Finn Valley Railway Company with respect to their Undertaking.
City of Glasgow Union Railway Act 1871	34 & 35 Vict. c. cxxvi	13 July 1871
An Act to confer further powers on the City of Glasgow Union Railway Company and the Glasgow and South-western Railway Company; and for other purposes.
Staveley Waterworks Act 1871	34 & 35 Vict. c. cxxvii	13 July 1871
An Act for better supplying with Water the parish of Staveley, and certain neighbouring parishes and places in the county of Derby; and for other purposes.
Dublin Main Drainage and Purification of Liffey Act 1871	34 & 35 Vict. c. cxxviii	13 July 1871
An Act to extend the Powers of the Lord Mayor, Aldermen, and Burgesses of Dublin for the Purification of the River Liffey and the Main Drainage of the said city; and for other purposes.
Hornsey Local Board Act 1871 (repealed)	34 & 35 Vict. c. cxxix	13 July 1871
An Act to make better provision for the Drainage of Hornsey in the county of Middlesex, and for other purposes relating thereto. (Repealed by Local Law (North West London Boroughs) Order 1965 (SI 1965/533))
Southampton Docks Act 1871	34 & 35 Vict. c. cxxx	13 July 1871
An Act for the consolidation and amendment of the several Acts relating to the Southampton Dock Company.
London, Chatham, and Dover Railway Act 1871	34 & 35 Vict. c. cxxxi	13 July 1871
An Act to extend the powers of the London, Chatham, and Dover Railway Company; and for other purposes.
Clyde Lighthouses Act 1871 (repealed)	34 & 35 Vict. c. cxxxii	13 July 1871
An Act to amend an Act passed in the twenty-ninth year of the reign of His Majesty King George the Second, intituled "An Act for erecting, maintaining, and supporting a Lighthouse on the Island of Little Cuniray in the county of Bute, at the Mouth of the River Clyde in North Britain; and for rendering the Navigation in the Frith and River of Clyde more safe and commodious." (Note: Little Cumbrae Lighthouse Act 1756 (29 Geo. 2. c. 20)) (Repealed by Clyde Lighthouses Consolidation Order Confirmation Act 1940 (3 & 4 Geo. 6. c. xlii))
Musselburgh and Dalkeith Water Act 1871	34 & 35 Vict. c. cxxxiii	13 July 1871
An Act for better supplying with Water the towns of Musselburgh and Dalkeith, and districts and places adjacent, in the county of Edinburgh.
Thirsk Gas Act 1871	34 & 35 Vict. c. cxxxiv	13 July 1871
An Act for better supplying Thirsk and Sowerby in the North Riding of Yorkshire with Gas.
Newcastle-upon-Tyne Improvement Act 1871 (repealed)	34 & 35 Vict. c. cxxxv	13 July 1871
An Act for the further Improvement and better Government of the Borough of Newcastle-upon-Tyne; and for other purposes. (Repealed by Tyne and Wear Act 1980 (c. xliii))
Whitby Gas Act 1871	34 & 35 Vict. c. cxxxvi	13 July 1871
An Act for better supplying Whitby and Ruswarp in the North Riding of Yorkshire with Gas.
Waterford and Wexford Railway Act 1871	34 & 35 Vict. c. cxxxvii	13 July 1871
An Act to enable the Waterford and Wexford Railway Company to make Deviations from and Extension in their authorised Railway; to abandon a portion of their authorised Railway; to extend the time for the purchase of Lands and completion of Works; and for other purposes.
Holborn Viaduct Station Act 1871	34 & 35 Vict. c. cxxxviii	13 July 1871
An Act to authorise the Construction of a Railway Station adjacent to the Holborn Viaduct and Newgate Street in the City of London, and of a short Line of Railway to connect the same with the London Chatham and Dover Railway, and for other purposes, and of which the short title is "Holborn Viaduct Station Act, 1871."
Northampton Improvement Act 1871 (repealed)	34 & 35 Vict. c. cxxxix	13 July 1871
An Act for amending the Northampton Improvement Act, 1843, (Note: Northampton Improvement Act 1843 (6 & 7 Vict. c. lxxviii)) and for conferring on the Commissioners thereunder additional powers; and for other purposes. (Repealed by Northampton Act 1988 (c. xxix))
Southport Improvement Act 1871	34 & 35 Vict. c. cxl	13 July 1871
An Act to amend the Southport Improvement Act, 1865, and to provide for the better government of the Borough of Southport; to authorise the Corporation of Southport to erect Sewerage Works, to make new Streets, and extend the Promenade at Southport; to extend their Gas Limits and improve and enlarge their Gasworks, Cemetery, Town Hall, and Markets; to extend the Boundary of the Borough; and for other purposes.
Aberdeen Municipality Extension Act 1871 (repealed)	34 & 35 Vict. c. cxli	13 July 1871
An Act to extend the Municipal Boundaries of the City of Aberdeen; and for other purposes. (Repealed by Aberdeen Corporation (Administration Finance &c.) Order Confirmation Act 1940 (3 & 4 Geo. 6. c. iii))
Portishead Docks Act 1871	34 & 35 Vict. c. cxlii	13 July 1871
An Act to authorise the Bristol and Portishead Pier and Railway Company to construct Docks at Portishead; and to amend and enlarge the existing Acts relating to the Company; and for other purposes.
Dorking Gas Act 1871 (repealed)	34 & 35 Vict. c. cxliii	13 July 1871
An Act for incorporating the Dorking Gas Company, and for enabling them to supply Gas within the parish of Dorking in the county of Surrey; and for other purposes. (Repealed by East Surrey Gas Order 1928 (SR&O 1928/1019))
Gas and Water Orders Confirmation Act 1871	34 & 35 Vict. c. cxliv	24 July 1871
An Act to confirm certain Provisional Orders made by the Board of Trade under The Gas and Water Works Facilities Act, 1870, (Note: Gas and Water Works Facilities Act 1870) relating to Aldeburgh Water, Bognor Gas, Bognor Water, Burgess Hill and Saint John's Common Water, Frome Water, Gisborough Water, Hawkhurst Gas, Herne Bay Water, Holywell Water, Knutsford Gas and Water, Northampton Gas, North Middlesex Gas, Pembroke Docks and Town Gas, Portmadoc Water, Southbank and Normanby Gas, Southend Water, Staines and Egham Gas, Stourbridge Gas, and Taunton Gas.
	Aldeburgh Water Order 1871 Order empowering the Aldeburgh Waterworks Company, Limited, to construct Waterworks and to supply Water in the town of Aldeburgh and its vicinity, in the county of Suffolk.	
	Bognor Water Order 1871 Order empowering the Bognor Water Company, Limited, to construct Waterworks and to supply Water in the town of Bognor and its vicinity, in the county of Sussex.	
	Burgess Hill and Saint John's Common Water Order 1871 Order empowering the Burgess Hill and Saint John's Common Water Company, Limited, to construct Waterworks, and to supply Water, in the parishes of Ditchling, Keymer, and Clayton, in the county of Sussex.	
	Frome Water Order 1871 Order empowering the Frome Water Company, Limited, to construct Waterworks, and to supply Water, in the parish of Corsley in the county of Wilts, and the parishes of Frome, Rodden, and Marston Bigott in the county of Somerset.	
	Gisborough Water Order 1871 Order conferring powers for the construction of Waterworks, and for the Supply of Water to Gisborough, in the north riding of the county of York.	
	Herne Bay Water Order 1871 Order empowering the Herne Bay Waterworks Company to raise additional capital.	
	Holywell Water Order 1871 Order conferring powers for the construction and maintenance of Waterworks and works connected therewith in the parish of Holywell, and for the supply of water to the town of Holywell, and parts of the townships of Greenfield and Brynford in the said parish of Holywell.	
	Portmadoc Water Order 1871 Order conferring powers for the maintenance and continuance of Waterworks and works connected therewith at Portmadoc, and for the supply of Water to the parishes of Llanfihangel-y-Traethau in the county of Merioneth, and Ynyscynhaiarn in the county of Carnarvon.	
	Southend Water Order 1871 Order empowering the Southend Waterworks Company (Limited) to maintain and continue Waterworks and works connected therewith at Southend in the county of Essex, and to supply Water to Southend, Prittlewell, and Southchurch in the county of Essex.	
	Bognor Gas Order 1871 Order empowering the Bognor Gaslight and Coke Company, Limited, to maintain and continue Gasworks, and to manufacture and supply Gas, in the town of Bognor and its vicinity in the County of Sussex.	
	Hawkhurst Gas Order 1871 Order empowering the Hawkhurst Gas Company, Limited, to maintain and continue Gasworks, and to manufacture and supply Gas in the parish of Hawkhurst in the county of Kent.	
	Northampton Gas Order 1871 Order empowering the Northampton Gaslight Company to raise additional Capital.	
	North Middlesex Gas Order 1871 Order empowering the North Middlesex Gas Company (Limited) to maintain and continue Gasworks, and to manufacture and supply Gas, in portion sof the parishes of Hendon and Finchley in the county of Middlesex.	
	Pembroke Docks and Town Gas Order 1871 Order empowering the Pembroke Docks and Town Gas Company, Limited, to maintain and continue Gasworks and to manufacture and supply Gas in the borough and county of Pembroke.	
	Southbank and Normanby Gas Order 1871 Order empowering the Southbank and Normanby Gaslight and Coke Company (Limited) to construct, maintain, and continue Gasworks and to manufacture Gas at Southbank near Middlesborough, in the north riding of the county of York, and to supply Gas to the townships of Normanby and Eston in the parish of Ormesby, the townships of Lackenby, Lazenby, and Wilton in the parish of Wilton, and other places in the north riding of the county of York.	
	Staines and Egham Gas Order 1871 Order empowering the Staines and Egham District Gas and Coke Company, Limited, to maintain and continue Gasworks and to manufacture and supply Gas in certain parishes in the counties of Middlesex, Surrey, and Berks.	
	Stourbridge Extension Gas Order 1871 Order empowering the Stourbridge Gas Company to supply Gas in the parish of Hagley in the county of Worcester.	
	Taunton Gas Order 1871 Order empowering the Taunton Gaslight and Coke Company to raise additional capital.	
	Knutsford Gas and Water Order 1871 Order empowering the Knutsford Gas and Water Company, Limited, to maintain and continue Gasworks and Waterworks, to manufacture and supply Gas, and to supply Water within the townships of Nether Knutsford, otherwise Knutsford Inferior, Over Knutsford, otherwise Knutsford Superior, Toft, and Bexton, in the parish of Nether Knutsford, otherwise Knutsford Inferior, in the county of Chester, and the townships of Tatton, Mere, and Over Tabley, otherwise Tabley Superior, in the parish of Rostherne, in the said county of Chester, and the township of Nether Tabley, overwise Tabley Inferior, in the parish of Great Budworth, in the said county of Chester.	
Oyster and Mussel Fisheries Orders Confirmation Act 1871 (No. 2) or the Oyster and Mussel Fisheries Orders Confirmation (No. 2) Act 1871	34 & 35 Vict. c. cxlv	24 July 1871
An Act to confirm certain Orders made by the Board of Trade under The Sea Fisheries Act, 1868, relating to Emsworth Channel and Swansea.
	Emsworth Channel Fishery Order 1871 Order for the Establishment and Maintenance by the Emsworth Dredgermen's Co-operative Society, Limited, of a Several Oyster and Mussel Fishery at Emsworth, in the Estuary of the Emsworth Channel, in the Counties of Sussex and Southampton.	
	Swansea Fishery Order 1871 Order for the Regulation by the Corporation of the Borough of Swansea, of an Oyster and Mussel Fishery, in part of Swansea Bay and part of the Bristol Channel lying off the South Coast of Gower, in the County of Glamorgan.	
Public Health (Scotland) Supplemental Act 1871	34 & 35 Vict. c. cxlvi	24 July 1871
An Act to confirm a Provisional Order under the "Public Health (Scotland) Act, 1867," (Note: Public Health (Scotland) Act 1867 (30 & 31 Vict. c. 101)) relating to the Burgh of Crieff.
	Crieff Order 1871 Crieef. Public Health (Scotland) Act, 1867. (30 & 31 Vict. c. 101.)	
Owens College Act 1871 (repealed)	34 & 35 Vict. c. cxlvii	24 July 1871
An Act for confirming a Scheme of the Charity Commissioners for the Owens College at Manchester; and for other purposes connected therewith. (Repealed by University of Manchester Act 2004 (c. iv))
	In the matter of the Owens Extension College, Manchester, Act 1870. (Note: Owens Extension College, Manchester Act 1870 (33 & 34 Vict. c. 2 Pr.))	
Letterkenny Railway Act 1871	34 & 35 Vict. c. cxlviii	24 July 1871
An Act to confer further Powers on the Letterkenny Railway Company with respect to their authorised Undertaking and their Capital.
Lincoln Waterworks Act 1871	34 & 35 Vict. c. cxlix	24 July 1871
An Act to define and extend the Undertaking of the Lincoln Waterworks Company; to authorise them to raise further Moneys; to effect a transfer of the Undertaking to the Lincoln Local Board; and for other purposes.
East London Railway Act 1871	34 & 35 Vict. c. cl	24 July 1871
An Act for enabling the East London Railway Company to abandon parts, and to alter the levels of other parts, of their authorised Railways; and for other purposes.
Huddersfield Improvement Act 1871 (repealed)	34 & 35 Vict. c. cli	24 July 1871
An Act for defining and extending the Powers of the Corporation of Huddersfield in relation to the Management of Streets in the Borough, and to Sewerage, and to Police, and other matters of Local Government; and for other purposes. (Repealed by West Yorkshire Act 1980 (c. xiv))
Columbia Market Approaches and Tramways Act 1871	34 & 35 Vict. c. clii	24 July 1871
An Act to empower the Promoter of Columbia Market to make certain Street Improvements and Tramways in connexion with the said Market.
Dundee Police and Improvement Act 1871 (repealed)	34 & 35 Vict. c. cliii	24 July 1871
An Act for the Improvement of the Burgh of Dundee, and the Police thereof; and for constructing new, and widening, altering, improving, and diverting existing Streets in said Burgh; and for constructing Sewers and other Works; and for other purposes. (Repealed by Dundee Corporation Order Confirmation Act 1948 (12, 13 & 14 Geo. 6. c. ii))
Burnley Borough Improvement Act 1871	34 & 35 Vict. c. cliv	24 July 1871
An Act for extending the Boundaries of the Municipal Borough of Burnley, for defining and extending the Powers of the Corporation of the Borough in relation to the Improvement and Management of Streets in the Borough, and to Sewerage and to Police and other matters of Local Government, and to Gas and Water Supply and Markets; and for other purposes.
Bradford Canal Act 1871	34 & 35 Vict. c. clv	24 July 1871
An Act to authorise the Sale of the Property of the Bradford Canal Company.
Bristol Port and Channel Dock Act 1871	34 & 35 Vict. c. clvi	24 July 1871
An Act to empower the Corporation of Bristol to subscribe to the Undertaking of the Bristol Port and Channel Dock Company; and for other purposes.
Liverpool Tramways Act 1871 (repealed)	34 & 35 Vict. c. clvii	24 July 1871
An Act for enabling the Liverpool Tramways Company to make new Tramways in Liverpool and its neighbourhood in connexion with and in extension of their authorised undertaking; and for other purposes. (Repealed by Liverpool Corporation Act 1921 (11 & 12 Geo. 5. c. lxxiv))
Thames Valley Drainage Act 1871 (repealed)	34 & 35 Vict. c. clviii	24 July 1871
An Act for the draining of Lands adjoining and near to the River Thames and its tributaries, in the counties of Berks, Oxford, Wilts, and Gloucester; and for other purposes. (Repealed by Statute Law Revision Act 1964 (c. 79))
Surrey County Offices Act 1871	34 & 35 Vict. c. clix	24 July 1871
An Act to enable the Justices of the Peace for the county of Surrey to provide a new Record Room and Offices for the Clerk of the Peace for the said county; and for other purposes.
Todmorden Gas Act 1871	34 & 35 Vict. c. clx	24 July 1871
An Act for incorporating and granting further powers to the Todmorden Gas Company.
Cardiff Improvement Act 1871	34 & 35 Vict. c. clxi	24 July 1871
An Act for defining and extending the powers of the Corporation and of the Local Board of Health of Cardiff in relation to matters of Local Government; and for other purposes.
Great Northern Railway Act 1871	34 & 35 Vict. c. clxii	24 July 1871
An Act to confer further powers on the Great Northern Railway Company.
Waterford Water Act 1871	34 & 35 Vict. c. clxiii	24 July 1871
An Act to vest in the Mayor, Aldermen, and Burgesses of Waterford the existing Waterworks, and to enable them to construct new works for supplying the Borough of Waterford and places adjacent with Water; and for other purposes.
Devon and Cornwall Railway Act 1871	34 & 35 Vict. c. clxiv	24 July 1871
An Act for conferring further powers upon the Devon and Cornwall Railway Company in relation to their undertaking; and for other purposes.
Navan and Kingscourt Railway Act 1871	34 & 35 Vict. c. clxv	24 July 1871
An Act to enable the Navan and Kingscourt Railway Company to make a Deviation in and to extend their Railway; and for other purposes.
Dover Harbour Act 1871 (repealed)	34 & 35 Vict. c. clxvi	24 July 1871
An Act to make further provision for the Maintenance and Improvement of Dover Harbour; and for other purposes. (Repealed by Dover Harbour Consolidation Act 1954 (2 & 3 Eliz. 2. c. iv))
South-western Railway General Act 1871	34 & 35 Vict. c. clxvii	24 July 1871
An Act for authorising the London and South-western Railway Company to construct Railways at Poole, Acton, and Southampton; and for conferring further powers on that Company in relation to their own undertaking and the undertakings of other Companies; and for other purposes.
Londonderry and Coleraine Railway (Sale) Act 1871	34 & 35 Vict. c. clxviii	24 July 1871
An Act for authorising the Sale of the Londonderry and Coleraine Railway to the Belfast and Northern Counties Railway Company; and for other purposes.
Bradford and Thornton Railways Act 1871	34 & 35 Vict. c. clxix	24 July 1871
An Act to authorise the Construction of Railways in the neighbourhood of Bradford in Yorkshire, to be called "The Bradford and Thornton Railways."
Lancashire and Yorkshire Railway (New Works and Additional Powers) Act 1871	34 & 35 Vict. c. clxx	24 July 1871
An Act for conferring further powers on the Lancashire and Yorkshire Railway Company.
British American Land Company's Act 1871	34 & 35 Vict. c. clxxi	24 July 1871
An Act for granting further powers to the British American Land Company.
Mining Company of Ireland Act 1871	34 & 35 Vict. c. clxxii	24 July 1871
An Act to facilitate the incorporation of The Mining Company of Ireland, and to define and extend the Objects and Powers of the Company; and for other purposes.
Usk and Towy Railway Act 1871 (repealed)	34 & 35 Vict. c. clxxiii	24 July 1871
An Act for making a Railway from the Neath and Brecon Railway at Devynock to the Central Wales Extension Railway at Llandovery; and for other purposes. (Repealed by Statute Law (Repeals) Act 2013 (c. 2))
Sligo and Ballaghaderreen Junction Railway Act 1871	34 & 35 Vict. c. clxxiv	31 July 1871
An Act to extend the powers of the Sligo and Ballaghaderreen Junction Railway Company for the taking of Lands and the Completion of their Undertaking; and for other purposes.
Birmingham West Suburban Railway Act 1871	34 & 35 Vict. c. clxxv	31 July 1871
An Act for authorising the making of a Railway from Birmingham in the county of Warwick to King's Norton in the county of Worcester; and for other purposes.
Burry Port and Gwendreath Valley Railway Amendment Act 1871	34 & 35 Vict. c. clxxvi	31 July 1871
An Act to extend the time granted to the Burry Port and Gwendreath Valley Railway Company for the completion of certain railways.
Great Western, Bristol and Exeter and South Devon Railways (Cornwall and West Cornwall Railways) Act 1871	34 & 35 Vict. c. clxxvii	31 July 1871
An Act for conferring further powers on the Great Western Railway Company, the Bristol and Exeter Railway Company, and the South Devon Railway Company, with reference to the Cornwall Railway Company and the West Cornwall Railway Company and their respective undertakings; and for other purposes.
Killorglin Railway Act 1871	34 & 35 Vict. c. clxxviii	31 July 1871
An Act for making a Railway in the county of Kerry, from Killorglin to the Farranfore Station of the Great Southern and Western Railway; and for other purposes.
North Metropolitan Tramways Act 1871	34 & 35 Vict. c. clxxix	31 July 1871
An Act to empower the North Metropolitan Tramways Company to construct new Tramways; and for other purposes.
Waterford, New Ross, and Wexford Junction Railway Act 1871	34 & 35 Vict. c. clxxx	31 July 1871
An Act to extend the time for the completion by the Waterford, New Ross, and Wexford Junction Railway Company of their Railways between Ballywilliam and New Ross, authorised by "The Waterford, New Ross, and Wexford Junction Railway Act, 1866," (Note: Waterford, New Ross and Wexford Junction Railway Act 1866 (29 & 30 Vict. c. cccxlviii)) and "The Waterford, New Ross, and Wexford Junction Railway (Deviation) Act, 1867." (Note: Waterford, New Ross and Wexford Junction Railway (Deviation) Act 1867 (30 & 31 Vict. c. cxxix))
Wandsworth Common Act 1871	34 & 35 Vict. c. clxxxi	31 July 1871
An Act for vesting the Management of the open space known as Wandsworth Common in the county of Surrey in a body of Conservators, with a view to the preservation thereof; and for other purposes.
Ennis and West Clare Railway Act 1871	34 & 35 Vict. c. clxxxii	31 July 1871
An Act to authorise the construction of the Ennis and West Clare Railway.
Great Western Railway Additional Powers Act 1871	34 & 35 Vict. c. clxxxiii	31 July 1871
An Act for conferring further Powers on the Great Western Railway Company in relation to their own undertaking and the undertakings of other Companies; and for other purposes.
Liverpool Improvement and Waterworks Act 1871	34 & 35 Vict. c. clxxxiv	31 July 1871
An Act to enable the Mayor, Aldermen, and Burgesses of the Borough of Liverpool to make new and widen existing Streets, and to construct new works in connexion with their Waterworks; to make provision with respect to the further improvement and government of the said Borough; and for other purposes.
Kent Coast Railway Act 1871	34 & 35 Vict. c. clxxxv	31 July 1871
An Act for authorising the Sale or Amalgamation of the Undertaking of the Kent Coast Railway Company; and for other purposes.
Leominster and Kington Railway Act 1871	34 & 35 Vict. c. clxxxvi	31 July 1871
An Act to enable the Leominster and Kington Railway Company to make a Branch Railway to Presteign; and for other purposes.
Local Government Supplemental Act 1871 (No. 4) or the Local Government Supplemental (No. 4) Act 1871	34 & 35 Vict. c. clxxxvii	14 August 1871
An Act to confirm certain Provisional Orders under "The Local Government Act, 1858," relating to the districts of Acton, Altrincham, Bognor, Bolton (Lancashire), Harrogate (2), Henley-on-Thames, Kingston-upon-Hull, Litchurch, Malvern, Nelson, Over Darwen, Pensarn, Prescot, Ramsgate, Redcar, St. Leonards, Stamford, Tottenham, Ware, Widnes, and Wimbledon; and for other purposes relative to the district of Stamford under the said Act.
	Acton Order 1871 Provisional Order putting in force the Lands Clauses Consolidation Act, 1845, within the district of the Acton Local Board, for the purchase of lands by the said board for purposes of road widening and street improvements.	
	Altrincham Order 1871 Provisional Order for altering the Order in Council applying the Public Health Act, 1848, to the district of Altringham, in the county of Chester.	
	Bognor Order 1871 Provisional Order for the partial repeal, and alteration of parts, of Local Acts in force within the district of the Bognor Local Board.	
	Bolton (Lancs.) Order 1871 Provisional Order putting in force the Lands Clauses Consolidation Act, 1845, within the district of the Bolton Local Board of Health, for the purchase of lands by the said Board for Street Improvements.	
	Harrogate Order (1) 1871 Provisional Order for the Alteration of the Harrogate Improvement Act, 1841, (Note: Harrogate Improvement Act 1841 (4 & 5 Vict. c. xvi)) in force within the District of Harrogate, in the County of York, under the Local Government Act, 1858.	
	Harrogate Order (2) 1871 Provisional Order for extending the Borrowing Powers of the Harrogate Local Board.	
	Henley-on-Thames Order 1871 Provisional Order putting in force the Lands Clauses Consolidation Act, 1845, within the district of the Henley-on-Thames Local Board for the purchase of Lands by the said Board for Street Improvements.	
	Kingston-upon-Hull Order 1871 Provisional Order putting in force the Lands Clauses Consolidation Act, 1845, within the borough of Kingston-upon-Hull, for the purchase of Lands by the Local Board of Health of the aforesaid borough for Street Improvements.	
	Litchurch Order 1871 Provisional Order putting in force the Lands Clauses Consolidation Act, 1845, within the district of the Litchurch Local Board, for the purchase of Lands by the said Board to form Wharves for the Sewage Works.	
	Malvern Order 1871 Provisional Order for partially repealing and amending The Malvern Improvement Act, 1851, (Note: Malvern Improvement Act 1851 (14 & 15 Vict. c. xcvi)) and for other purposes.	
	Nelson Order 1871 Provisional Order altering parts of a Local Act (Note: Nelson Water and Gas Act 1866 (29 & 30 Vict. c. lxxvi)) in force within the District of the Nelson Local Board.	
	Over Darwen Order 1871 Provisional Order for altering the Provisional Order applying the Public Health Act, 1848, to the district of Over Darwen in the county of Lancaster.	
	Pensarn Order 1871 Provisional Order for extending the Borrowing Powers of the Pensarn Local Board.	
	Prescot Order 1871 Provisional Order putting in force the Lands Clauses Consolidation Act, 1845, for the purchase of Land by the Local Board of Prescot for purposes of Sewage Works and Irrigation.	
	Ramsgate Order 1871 Provisional Order repealing Section 2 of the "Local Government Supplemental Act, 1866" (No. 4), (Note: Local Government Supplemental Act 1866 (No. 4) (29 & 30 Vict. c. 107)) which limits the rating power of the Ramsgate Local Board.	
	Redcar Order 1871 Provisional Order for altering the Boundaries of the District of Redcar, in the County of York, under the Provisions of the Local Government Act, 1858.	
	St. Leonards Order 1871 Provisional Order altering parts of a Local Act (Note: St. Leonards Improvement Act 1832 (2 & 3 Will. 4. c. xlv)) in force within the District of St. Leonards Improvement Commissioners exercising certain powers of a Local Board for the said District.	
	Stamford Order 1871 Provisional Order repealing and altering Parts of a Local Act (Note: Stamford Improvement Act 1841 (4 & 5 Vict. c. lxix)) in force within the District of the Stamford Local Board.	
	Tottenham Order 1871 Provisional Order for altering the Order in Council applying the Public Health Act, 1848, to the district of Tottenham in the County of Middlesex.	
	Ware Order 1871 Provisional Order for extending the Borrowing Powers of the Ware Local Board of Health.	
	Widnes Order 1871 Provisional Order for extending the Borrowing Powers of the Widnes Local Board.	
	Wimbledon Order 1871 Provisional Order putting in force the Lands Clauses Consolidation Act, 1845, within the district of the Wimbledon Local Board for the purchase of Lands by the said Board for Street Widening and Road Improvements.	
Sewage Utilization Supplemental Act 1871	34 & 35 Vict. c. clxxxviii	14 August 1871
An Act to confirm certain Provisional Orders under "The Sewage Utilization Acts," relating to the districts of Hillmorton and Hurworth.
	Hillmorton Order 1871 Provisional Order putting in force the Lands Clauses Consolidation Act, 1845, within the parish of Hillmorton, for the Purchase of Lands by the Surveyor, acting as Sewer Authority in the place of the Vestry of the said parish, for the purposes of Sewage Outfall and Irrigation.	
	Hurworth Order 1871 Provisional Order putting in force the Lands Clauses Consolidation Act, 1845, within the Township of Hurworth, for the Purchase of Lands by the Sewer Authority of the said Township for the purposes of Sewage Irrigation.	
Tramways Orders Confirmation Act 1871	34 & 35 Vict. c. clxxxix	14 August 1871
An Act for confirming certain Provisional Orders made by the Board of Trade under The Tramways Act, 1870, (Note: Tramways Act 1870 (33 & 34 Vict. c. 78)) for the construction of Tramways in Cardiff, Leeds, Yarmouth, and Wallasey.
	Cardiff Tramways Order 1871 Order authorising the construction of Tramways in the town of Cardiff and its suburbs.	
	Leeds Tramways Order 1871 Order authorising the construction of Tramways in the Borough of Leeds in the West Riding of the County of York.	
	East Anglian Tramway Order 1871 Order authorising the construction of a Tramway between Gorleston and Great Yarmouth, in the county of Suffolk.	
	Wallasey Tramways Order 1871 Order authorising the construction of Tramways in the Parish of Wallasey in the County Palatine of Chester.	
Lyme Regis Railway Act 1871	34 & 35 Vict. c. cxc	14 August 1871
An Act for making a Railway from Axminster in the county of Devon to Lyme Regis in the county of Dorset; and for other purposes.
Alliance and Dublin Gas Act 1871	34 & 35 Vict. c. cxci	14 August 1871
An Act to amend the "Alliance and Dublin Gas Act, 1866," (Note: Alliance and Dublin Gas Act 1866 (29 & 30 Vict. c. ccv)) to confer further Powers on the Alliance and Dublin Consumers Gas Company; and for other purposes.
North and South Western Junction Railway Act 1871	34 & 35 Vict. c. cxcii	14 August 1871
An Act for confirming an Agreement for a Lease of the undertaking of the North and South Western Junction Railway Company; and for other purposes.
Watford Gas and Coke Company's Act 1871	34 & 35 Vict. c. cxciii	14 August 1871
An Act for incorporating the Watford Gas and Coke Company, and for enabling them to supply Gas within the parishes of Watford and Bushey in the county of Hertford; and for other purposes.
Harrow, Edgware, and London Railway Act 1871 (repealed)	34 & 35 Vict. c. cxciv	14 August 1871
An Act to authorise the Harrow, Edgware, and London Railway Company to enter into Working Arrangements with the Great Northern Railway Company. (Repealed by Harrow, Edgware and London Railway (Abandonment) Act 1874 (37 & 38 Vict. c. cvi))
Barnsley Canal Transfer Act 1871	34 & 35 Vict. c. cxcv	14 August 1871
An Act for authorising the transfer of the Undertaking of the Company of Proprietors of the Barnsley Canal Navigation to the Undertakers of the Navigation of the Rivers of Aire and Calder in the county of York, and for providing a better supply of Water to the said Canal; and for other purposes.
Bridgwater Waterworks Act 1871	34 & 35 Vict. c. cxcvi	14 August 1871
An Act for better supplying with Water the Borough of Bridgwater and other places in the county of Somerset.
Mersey Docks (Liverpool River Approaches) Act 1871	34 & 35 Vict. c. cxcvii	14 August 1871
An Act for improving the Access to the River Mersey on the Liverpool side, and to amend the Acts relating to the Mersey Docks and Harbour Board; and for other purposes.
Newry Improvement and Water Act 1871	34 & 35 Vict. c. cxcviii	14 August 1871
An Act for the Improvement of the Local Government of the town of Newry; for the construction and maintenance of new Waterworks; for supplying Water to the said town and neighbourhood; and for other purposes.
Alexandra Park Railway Act 1871 (repealed)	34 & 35 Vict. c. cxcix	14 August 1871
An Act for making a Railway from the Tottenham and Hampstead Junction Railway to the Alexandra Park. (Repealed by Statute Law (Repeals) Act 2013 (c. 2))
West Lancashire Railway Act 1871	34 & 35 Vict. c. cc	14 August 1871
An Act for the making and maintaining of the West Lancashire Railway; and for other purposes.
Mersey Railway Act 1871	34 & 35 Vict. c. cci	14 August 1871
An Act to authorise the Mersey Railway Company to divert their authorised Line and to connect it with existing Railways at Liverpool and Birkenhead; and for other purposes.
London Central Railway Act 1871 (repealed)	34 & 35 Vict. c. ccii	14 August 1871
An Act for incorporating the London Central Railway Company, and authorising them to make and maintain the London Central Railway; and to make new Streets between Oxford Street and Leicester Square and between Leicester Square and Castle Street; and for other purposes. (Repealed by London Central Railway (Abandonment) Act 1875 (38 & 39 Vict. c. cxiv))
London and Aylesbury Railway Act 1871	34 & 35 Vict. c. cciii	16 August 1871
An Act for the making and maintaining of a Railway from Aylesbury in the county of Buckingham to Rickmansworth in the county of Hertford; and for other purposes.
Wimbledon and Putney Commons Act 1871	34 & 35 Vict. c. cciv	16 August 1871
An Act for vesting the Management of Wimbledon Common (including Wimbledon Green and Putney Heath) and Putney Lower Common in the county of Surrey in a body of Conservators, with a view to the Preservation thereof; and for other purposes.
Somerset and Dorset Railway (Extension to the Midland Railway at Bath) Act 1871	34 & 35 Vict. c. ccv	21 August 1871
An Act for authorising the Somerset and Dorset Railway Company to make a Line of Railway from their Railway at Evercreech to the Midland Railway at Bath, with a Branch to the Bristol and North Somerset Railway at Radstock; and to raise further Moneys; and for other purposes; and of which the Short Title is "Somerset and Dorset Railway (Extension to the Midland Railway at Bath) Act, 1871.
Southern Railway (Additional Powers) Act 1871 (repealed)	34 & 35 Vict. c. ccvi	21 August 1871
An Act to extend the powers of the Southern Railway Company for the taking of Lands and the completion of their Undertaking; and for other purposes. (Repealed by Statute Law (Repeals) Act 2013 (c. 2))

=== Private acts ===
Short title	Citation	Royal assent
Long title
Brown's Estate Act 1871	34 & 35 Vict. c. 1 Pr.	16 June 1871
An Act for authorising the Sale of certain Property comprised in the Trust, Disposition, and Settlement of the late John Brown of Marlie, and investing the Price in Land to be entailed in lieu thereof, and for other purposes.
Donald Maclaine's Estate Act 1871	34 & 35 Vict. c. 2 Pr.	24 July 1871
An Act to authorise the Sale of a Part or Parts of the Lands and Estate of Lochbuy (Note: Clan Maclaine of Lochbuie) and Fishnish, and others, in the Island of Mull, and County of Argyll, for the purpose of paying certain Debts due by the now deceased Donald Maclaine, of Lochbuy, and by his Trust Estates, and of satisfying certain Provisions made by him in favour of his Children, or to charge parts of such Lands and Estates with Portions of the said Debts and Provisions, and for other purposes.
Temple Guiting Estate Act 1871	34 & 35 Vict. c. 3 Pr.	24 July 1871
An Act to authorise the President and of Corpus Christi College, in the University of Oxford, to grant a Lease of Part of their states situate in the Parish of Temple Guiting, (Note: Temple Guiting) in the County of Gloucester.
Earl of Abergavenny's Estate Act 1871	34 & 35 Vict. c. 4 Pr.	14 August 1871
An Act for extending and varying the Provisions concerning Leases and Sales contained in the Acts relating to the Settled Estates of the Earl of Abergavenny, (Note: William Nevill, 1st Marquess of Abergavenny) and for other purposes connected with those Estates.
Paddington Estate Act 1871	34 & 35 Vict. c. 5 Pr.	14 August 1871
An Act for enabling the Lessees of an Estate at Paddington, in the County of Middlesex, with the consent of the Ecclesiastical Commissioners for England, to accept Surrenders of existing Leases of parts of the Estate, and to grant new Leases in lieu thereof, and for other purposes relating to the said Estate.
Earl of Derby's Estate Act 1871	34 & 35 Vict. c. 6 Pr.	14 August 1871
An Act to enable the granting of certain Leases of parts of the Estates in Lancashire devised by the Will of the Right Honourable Edward Geoffrey Earl of Derby, (Note: Edward Smith-Stanley, 14th Earl of Derby) deceased, and to give certain Powers with respect to the said Estates.
Wigan Rectory Glebe Act 1871	34 & 35 Vict. c. 7 Pr.	14 August 1871
An Act. to grant further Powers of Leasing and other Powers to the Rector of the Parish Church of Wigan, in the County Palatine of Lancaster, in relation to the Glebe Lands belonging to the Rectory, and for other purposes.
Glossop Dale Estate Act 1871	34 & 35 Vict. c. 8 Pr.	14 August 1871
An Act for authorising Leases of the Settled Estates of Lord Howard, of Glossop, in and near Glossop Dale, in the Counties of Derby and Chester, and for other purposes, and of which the Short Title is "The Glossop Dale Estate Act, 1871."
Stanford's Estate Act 1871	34 & 35 Vict. c. 9 Pr.	16 June 1871
An Act to authorise the granting of Building and Improvement Leases of the Estates in the County of Sussex devised by the Will of William Stanford, Esquire, and for other purposes.
Wilson's Divorce Act 1871 (Note: This act was not printed by the Queen's Printer.)	34 & 35 Vict. c. 10 Pr.	16 June 1871
An Act to dissolve the Marriage of Timothy Bunton Wilson, Sub-Inspector of the Royal Irish Constabulary, with Mary Hampton Wilson, his now Wife, and to enable him to marry again, and for other purposes.
Earl Cowper's Restitution Act 1871	34 & 35 Vict. c. 11 Pr.	31 July 1871
An Act to relieve Francis Thomas de Grey Earl Cowper, (Note: Francis Cowper, 7th Earl Cowper) Knight of the Most Noble Order of the Garter, and the Heirs for the time being of the body of Richard Earl of Desmond, in the Peerage of Ireland and Lord Dingwall, (Note: Lord Dingwall) in the Peerage of Scotland, and the Heirs for the time being of the body of Thomas Earl of Ossory, (Note: Thomas Butler, 6th Earl of Ossory) in the Peerage of Ireland, and Lord Butler of Moore Park, (Note: Baron Butler) in the Peerage of England, from the Effect of the Attainder of James Second Duke of Ormond. (Note: James Butler, 2nd Duke of Ormonde)

=== Sources ===
- 34 & 35 Victoria - 1871 – via Google Books.
- Journal of the House of Commons (PDF). Vol. 126. London: His Majesty's Stationery Office. pp. 3–446 – via Parliament of the United Kingdom.
- Chronological Table of and Index to the Statutes. Vol. 1: To the End of the Session 59 Vict. Sess. 2 (1895) (13th ed.). London: Her Majesty's Stationery Office. 1896. pp. 455–460 – via Google Books.

== See also ==
- List of acts of the Parliament of the United Kingdom
