= Redcar Pier =

Pier in Redcar, England

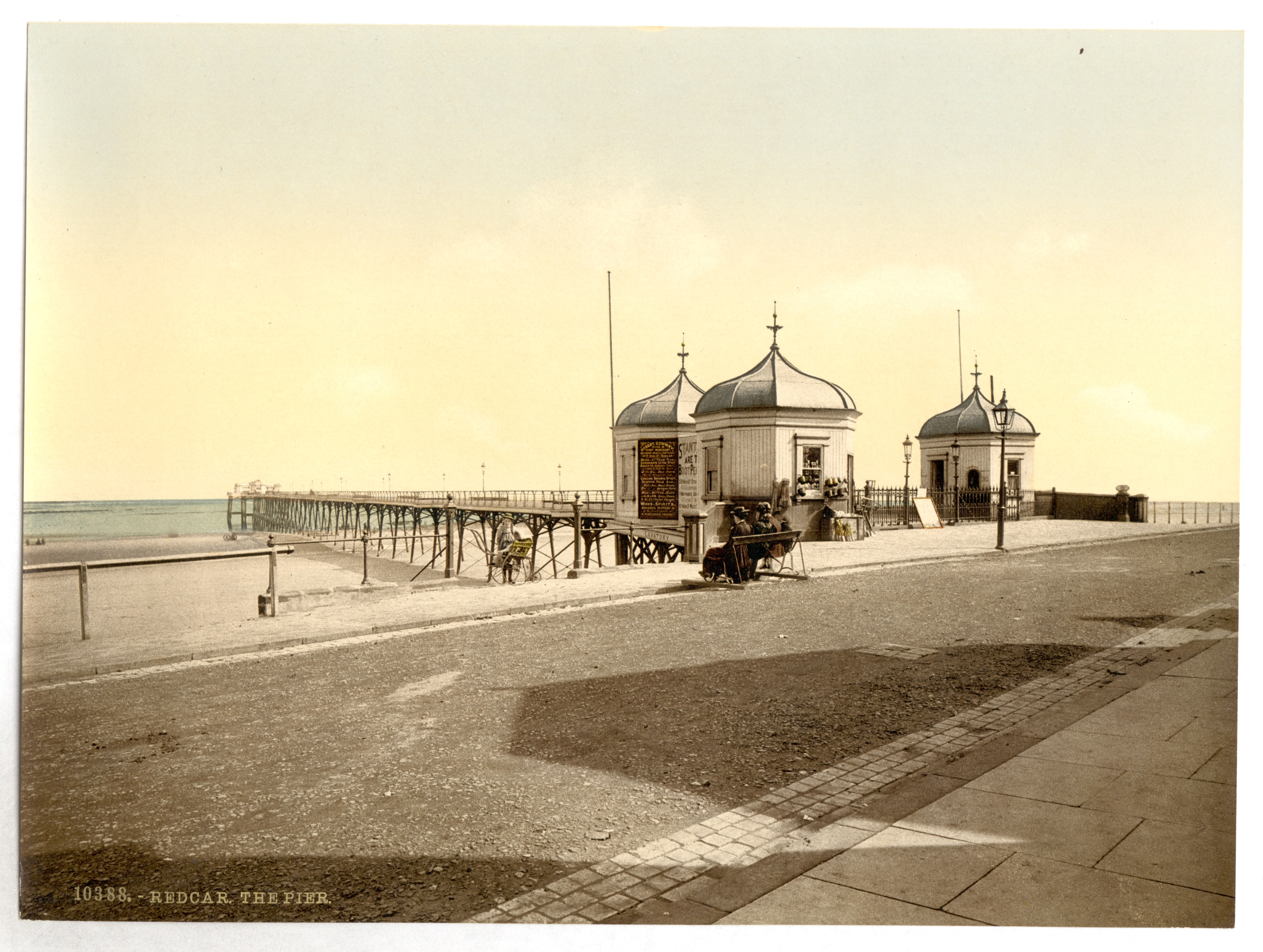
- Type: Victorian pleasure and landing pier
- Carries: Originally promenaders and steamer passengers
- Spans: North Sea
- Location: The Esplanade, Redcar, Redcar and Cleveland
- Coordinates: 54°37′09″N 1°03′27″W
- Owner: Langbaurgh Council at closure
- Operator: Mecca Leisure Group at closure

Characteristics
- Total length: 1,300 feet (396 m)
- Width: 20 feet (6.1 m) widening to 65 feet (19.8 m) at the pier head

History
- Designer: Joseph Emmerson Dowson & A. Dowson
- Constructor: Head Wrightson
- Client: Redcar Pier Company
- Completion date: 1873
- Inaugurated: 2 June 1873
- Cost: £11,000
- Closure date: 1980
- Demolition date: 1980-81

Redcar Pier was a Victorian pleasure and landing pier constructed on The Esplanade in the seaside town of Redcar on the north east coast of Yorkshire, England.

== Planning, design, construction and opening ==
The construction of Redcar Pier in Redcar was proposed in 1866 and on 2 August the Redcar Pier Company was formed followed by the Redcar Pier Order 1866 authorising construction. There was little interest in proceeding to construct the pier until the plans were drawn up for a pier at neighbouring Coatham. The Redcar Pier scheme was financed by the sale of shares and a donation from the Earl of Zetland.

With a design by J.E. & A. Dowson of Westminster, Head Wrightson constructed the pier beginning work on 28 August 1871. The 9-inch (22.9 cm) diameter cast iron piles were driven into the rock by heavy pile driving machinery. To the piles were added pairs of columns spaced 30 feet (9.1 m) apart leaning inwards. The first pile was ceremonially driven into the shale rock by the leader of the Redcar Pier Company, Rear Admiral Chaloner of Guisborough. After the death of Lord Zetland earlier, the pier was initially opened by Mrs Dawson of Weston Hall.

The pier was 20 feet (6.1 m) wide expanding to a pier head 65 feet (19.8 m) wide and 114 feet (34.7 m) long with a separate landing stage for steamers. There was also a bandstand so that bands could play to an audience of 700 undercover, behind protective shields. Originally the pier was 1,300 feet (396 m) long with three round kiosks at the pier entrance housing the toll office and the ladies and gentleman's cloakrooms. The pier length was necessary to achieve a depth of 10 feet (3.0 m) of water at low tide next to the landing stage. The pier was completed by 1873 at a cost of £11,000 and was opened on 2 June that year by Rear Admiral Chaloner.

== Operation and decline ==
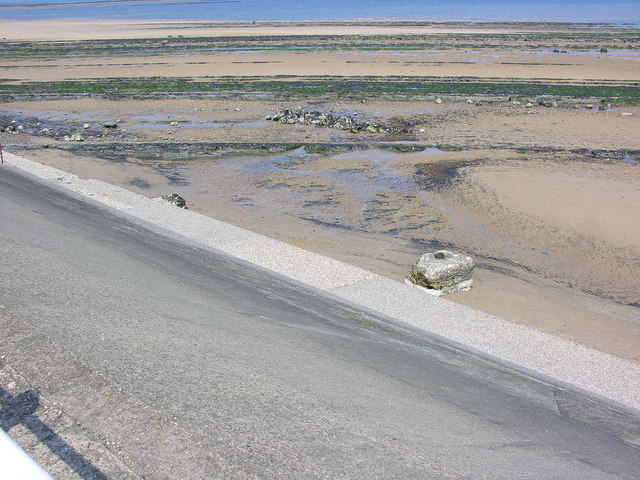
Remnant of the pier

In 1880 the brig Luna was driven ashore in a storm and later when re-floated the remains of the Luna were driven through the pier in a storm on 30 October 1880. In 1885 the paddle steamer SS Cochrane damaged and carried away Redcar Pier's landing stage. The landing stage was never rebuilt. In 1897 the pier was damaged by the abandoned Norwegian schooner Amarant causing a 60 feet (18.3 m) breach but the pier was repaired. The pier head saloon and bandstand were destroyed by fire in August 1898 causing £1,000–£1,500 of damage, Subsequently, the pier head was repaired but the bandstand was not replaced.

A pavilion ballroom was added on the pier in 1907 and extended on the landward side in 1909, then extended landward again in two further stages. The final extension in 1928 included a cafe tearoom necessitating the removal of the three round kiosks replaced by two new square kiosks added to the side of the entrance. In 1940 during the Second World War, a long central section of the pier was removed in case of an invasion. During the war the pier was further damaged by storms and an exploding mine.

=== Post war ===
Pier and Harbour Order (Redcar) Confirmation Act 1948
- Act of Parliament
- Parliament of the United Kingdom
- Long title: An Act to confirm a Provisional Order made by the Minister of Transport under the General Pier and Harbour Act 1861 relating to Redcar.
- Citation: 11 & 12 Geo. 6. c. xxii

Dates
- Royal assent: 30 July 1948

Other legislation
- Relates to: General Pier and Harbour Act 1861

Text of statute as originally enacted

Redcar Council bought the pier in 1946 for £4,500 but the pier was never repaired and simply allowed to disintegrate. The east coast storms of 1953 caused further damage. After loss of further pier length in a storm in 1978 the coastguard hut on the end of the pier was removed and the coastguard re-established on the roof of the Zetland Lifeboat Museum.

In August 1978 a Wurlitzer organ was installed in the pier ballroom and it was in use for 18 months before being removed after further damage to the pier by the sea.

In 1980 Langbaurgh Borough Council declared the pier unsafe and that year sold the pier for £250 as scrap. With demolition over the year end 1980–1981 the site was cleared by March 1981. The final length of the pier was 87 feet (26.5 m). A blue plaque on a seafront brick wall on the Esplanade indicates the site of the former Redcar Pier.
