= Coatham Pier =

Former pier in North Yorkshire, England

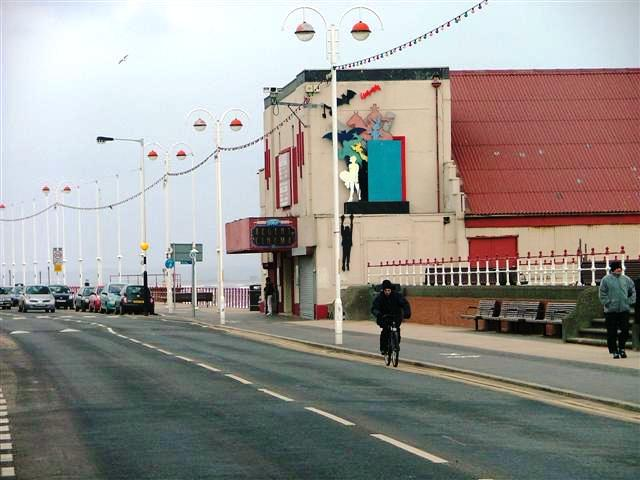
- Regent Cinema, on the site of Coatham Pier entrance
- Type: Promenade and pleasure pier
- Carries: Promenaders
- Spans: North Sea
- Location: Newcomen Terrace, Coatham, Redcar, Redcar and Cleveland
- Coordinates: 54°37′21″N 1°04′14″W
- Official name: Victoria Pier, Coatham

Characteristics
- Total length: 1,800 feet (549 m)

History
- Client: Coatham Victoria Pier Company
- Completion date: 1875
- Opening date: 1875
- Closure date: 1898
- Destruction date: 1898
- Demolition date: 1899

Coatham Pier or Victoria Pier, Coatham, was a pleasure pier built on Newcomen Terrace in the Coatham area of Redcar on the north-east Yorkshire coast.

== Planning and design ==
In 1870 a pier for Coatham was proposed. After much discussion the decision was made to place the pier on Newcomen Terrace at the end of Newcomen Street – renamed Station Road in 1935.

On 22 September 1870 the Coatham Victoria Pier Company was registered and the following year the Coatham Victoria Pier Order 1871 was obtained to construct the pier. The pier was planned to be 2,250 feet (686 m) long with two pavilions and two tollbooth kiosks. One pavilion located midway along was for orchestral music and the other, east of the entrance was to house a roller skating rink.

== Construction, damage and opening ==
Work on Coatham pier started in 1871. The pier was partially opened to the public from July 1872.

During a storm on 8 December 1874, before construction was complete, two ships collided with the pier – the schooner Griffin of Southampton and the schooner Corrymbus of Dundee causing two breaches in the pier, cutting it in three. The Griffin with a crew of seven was carrying a cargo of oak in a heavy north easterly storm when in driving rain and high seas the crew failed to see the end of the incomplete pier and collided with it at about 4 am on the 9th. The crew escaped by climbing onto the pier. The ship then swung round in the gale and went through the pier broadside on and beached a mile up Coatham Sands.

In the same storm the Corrymbus was driven through the pier between the pavilions then grounded a mile and a half up Coatham Sands. The crew came ashore when the tide receded. That night a total of four vessels came ashore on that stretch of coast but due to the actions of the rocket men, lifeboat and coastguard there were no deaths.

Due to high repair costs the decision was made to reduce the planned pier length by 200 feet (61 m) and build to a length of 1,800 feet (549 m). The pier was complete by 1875 opening that year.

== Operation and destruction ==
The pier was shorter than originally planned but it still had the music pavilion halfway along, the indoor roller skating rink pavilion and two kiosks at the entrance, one for a toll booth and the other for selling newspapers and books.

On 22 October 1898 Coatham Pier was badly wrecked by the 757-tonne (834-ton) barque Birger from Rauma in Finland carrying a cargo of salt from San Carlo in Spain to Abo in Finland. In a major storm the boat was forced over Saltscar Rocks, snapping her masts and killing the captain and chief officer. She made a 100-yard (91 m) breach in the pier, isolating the music pavilion. In the shipwreck two crew members were rescued while thirteen people died. The bodies were washed ashore in places from Saltburn to Seaton Carew and buried there. The Birger was off the Norwegian coast when she was blown across the Dogger Bank and hit further trouble when she sprung a leak and lost her bilge pump. Distress signals from the Birger were seen off Robin Hood's Bay as the boat was blown up the coast by the intense gale.

The isolated section of the pier collapsed a year later and was dismantled. In 1899, the pier company failed, and the remainder of the pier was abandoned to disintegrate and was eventually sold for scrap. This left the roller skating rink pavilion and the entrance kiosks. Years later the anchor of the Birger was found by divers, brought ashore and placed in a railed off sea front display near the Zetland Lifeboat Museum.

== Redevelopment ==
In 1910 the roller skating pavilion was demolished by the local authority and replaced by a large glass and metal shelter nicknamed The Glasshouse incorporating the entrance kiosks.

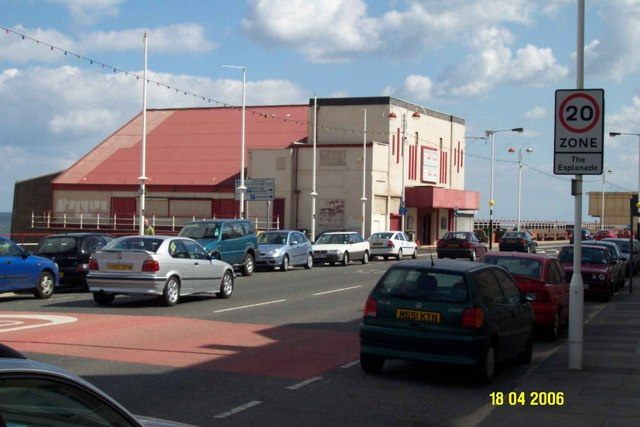
Regent Cinema, at the location of Coatham Pier entrance

In 1928 the pavilion and kiosks were removed and the site redeveloped as the New Pavilion theatre. Larry Grayson, Mike Neville and others performed there. In 1964 the theatre was converted to the Regent Cinema. On an exterior wall of the cinema is a blue plaque commemorating the Victoria Pier.
