= Hugh Joicey, 3rd Baron Joicey =

Lieutenant-Colonel Hugh Edward Joicey, 3rd Baron Joicey (1881–1966), known as the Hon. Hugh Joicey until 1940, was a British Army officer, businessman and peer.

== Career ==
Joicey was the second son of the coal mining magnate and Liberal Party politician James Joicey from Durham. His father was created a Baronet in 1893, and then elevated to the peerage as Baron Joicey in 1906. His elder brother James Arthur Joicey (1880–1940) succeeded to the peerage on their father's death in 1936, but left only three surviving daughters on his own death four years later, when Hugh Edward succeeded. With the inheritance came the family seat at Etal Manor on the Ford Castle and Etal Castle estate.

Joicey was commissioned into the 14th Hussars as a second-lieutenant on 3 October 1900, and served in the Second Boer War in South Africa in 1901. After the war had ended, he was promoted to lieutenant on 27 August 1902. He later served with the 1st battalion Suffolk Regiment in the First World War, gaining the rank of lieutenant-colonel. He was High Sheriff of Northumberland in 1933.

== Family ==
Joicey married in 1921 Lady Joan Katherine Lambton (1893–1967), youngest daughter of Frederick Lambton, 4th Earl of Durham. They had two sons:

- Lieutenant David Hugh Joicey (1922–1943), an officer in the Coldstream Guards, who died in Italy from wounds received in action.
- Captain Michael Edward Joicey, 4th Baron Joicey (1925–1993), who succeeded in the peerage.

Coat of arms of Hugh Joicey, 3rd Baron Joicey
Crest A demi-man affrontée in armour Proper, garnished Or, the helmet adorned with three feathers Gules, holding in the dexter hand a scimitar of the first, pommel and hilt Gold, supporting with the sinister hand an escutcheon Argent, charged with three torteaux within two bendlets invected of the second between two fleurs-de-lis Sable. Escutcheon Argent three lozenges Sable within two bendlets invected Gules between two miners' picks in bend Proper. Supporters On either side a Shetland pony Proper, haltered Or. Motto Omne Solum Forti Patria

Peerage of the United Kingdom
Preceded by James Arthur Joicey	Baron Joicey; 1940 – 1966	Succeeded by Michael Edward Joicey
