= Ford Moss =

Protected area in Northumberland, England

- Site of Special Scientific Interest
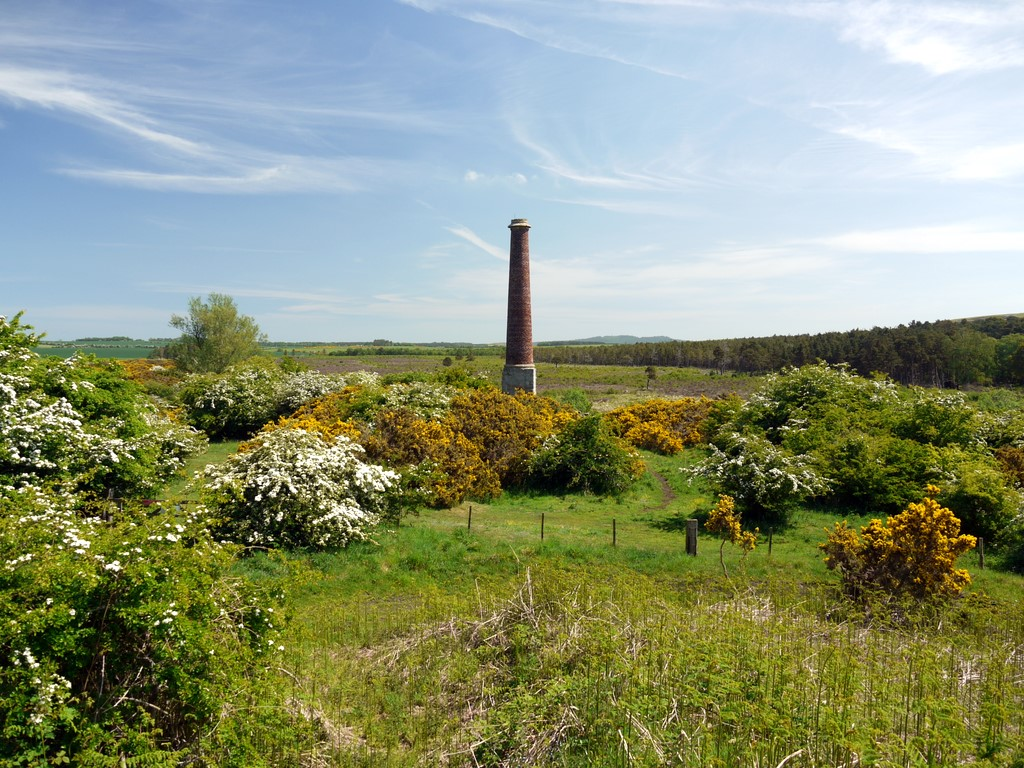
- Location of Ford Moss.
- Area of search: Northumberland
- Grid reference: NT970375
- Coordinates: 55.6311°N 2.0492°W
- Interest: Biological
- Area: 60.91 hectares (150.5 acres)
- Notification date: 1968
- Location map: DEFRA MAGIC Map

Ford Moss is a Site of Special Scientific Interest (SSSI), containing a Scheduled Ancient Monument, located 12 miles (19 km) south-west of Berwick-upon-Tweed, Northumberland, England. The site is managed by the Northumberland Wildlife Trust and gained its SSSI status in 1968, and in 2005 it was designated a Special Area of Conservation.

== Location and natural features ==
Ford Moss is bound to the south by the 165-metre (541 ft) high Goatscrag Hill and the west by the 150 m (490 ft) Blackchester Hill, both of which are sandstone formations. It is one of two SSSIs located on the Ford & Etal estate which were originally two separate estates combined in 1908 when James Joicey, 1st Baron Joicey purchased them both. Access can be gained by heading south off the B6353 (vehicles must be left at the gate of the site) and although there are some good footpaths for the general public, permits are required to enter certain parts. The 71.6-hectare (177-acre) site, situated around 110 m (360 ft) above sea level, is made up partly (46 hectares) of a raised bog of peat, which is up to 12 m (39 ft) deep in places and underlain by carboniferous limestone some 363 to 325 million years ago. The bog, or mire, was a rainfed lake at some point in its history of which the build up of vegetation outstripped that of decomposition, giving it its 'raised' aspect. A report to the Government Office of the North East (GONE) stated that "although partly drained, the re-wetted surface contains many waterlogged areas," that "the water table should normally be within 25 cm of the surface" and that the water quality was "good." Flora include heather, cotton grass, hares tail and cross-leaved heath and fauna to be found are red squirrels, roe deer, curlew, red grouse and adders amongst others. The first Northumberian sightings of the solitary bee "Colletes succinctus" were made around the bog in 2007. To the south of the bog is found ancient woodland containing Scots Pine, birch and willow trees.

== Man-made features ==
There is some evidence that a deserted village from the medieval age existed on the site although information is difficult to find about it.

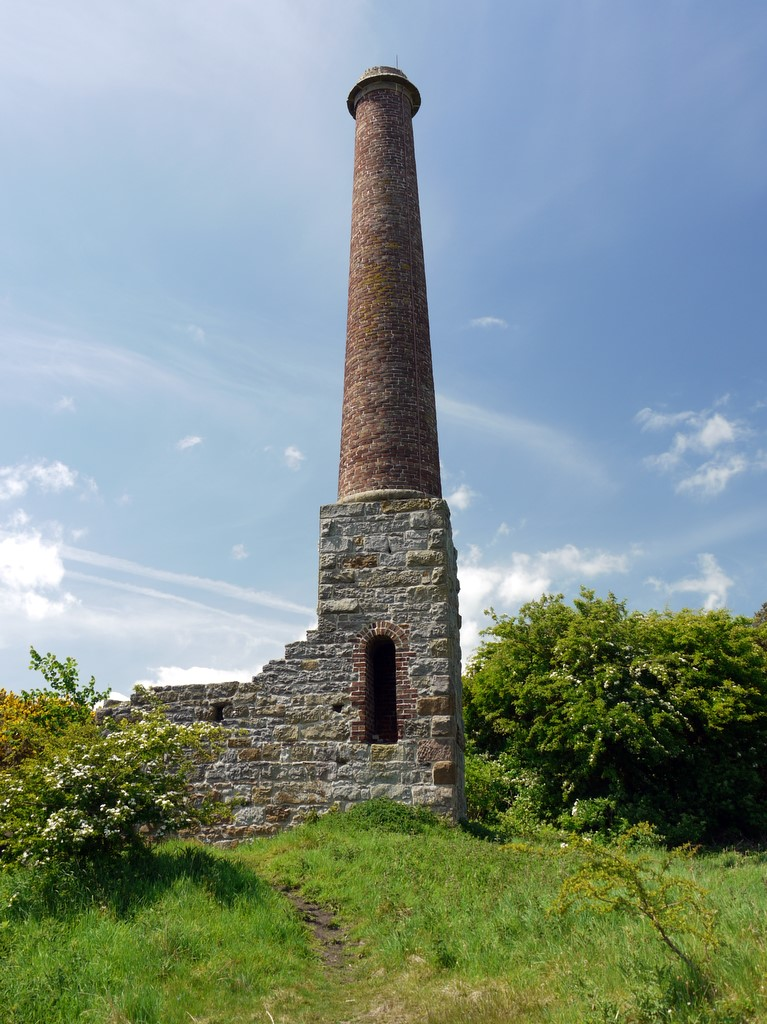
Colliery chimney

On the western edge of the site are located the remains of a colliery which was in use from at least the late 17th century to the outbreak of World War I. The colliery supplied local businesses, such as a brick and tileworks at Flodden and Ford Forge. A small collection of houses surrounded the colliery and there was even a railway proposed in 1852 which was however never built. Despite not falling out of use until reasonably recently there is very little evidence of it to be found except for engine house walls, the bases of some of the miners' cottages, and an engine house chimney, Grade II listed in 1988 and described as "Mid C19. Snecked stone and brick in English Garden Wall Bond. Tall square stone base with a round brick arch on 2 sides. Tall round brick chimney with roll-moulded ashlar base and ashlar cornice."
