= Ford Forge =

Coordinates: 55.63910°N 2.11117°W

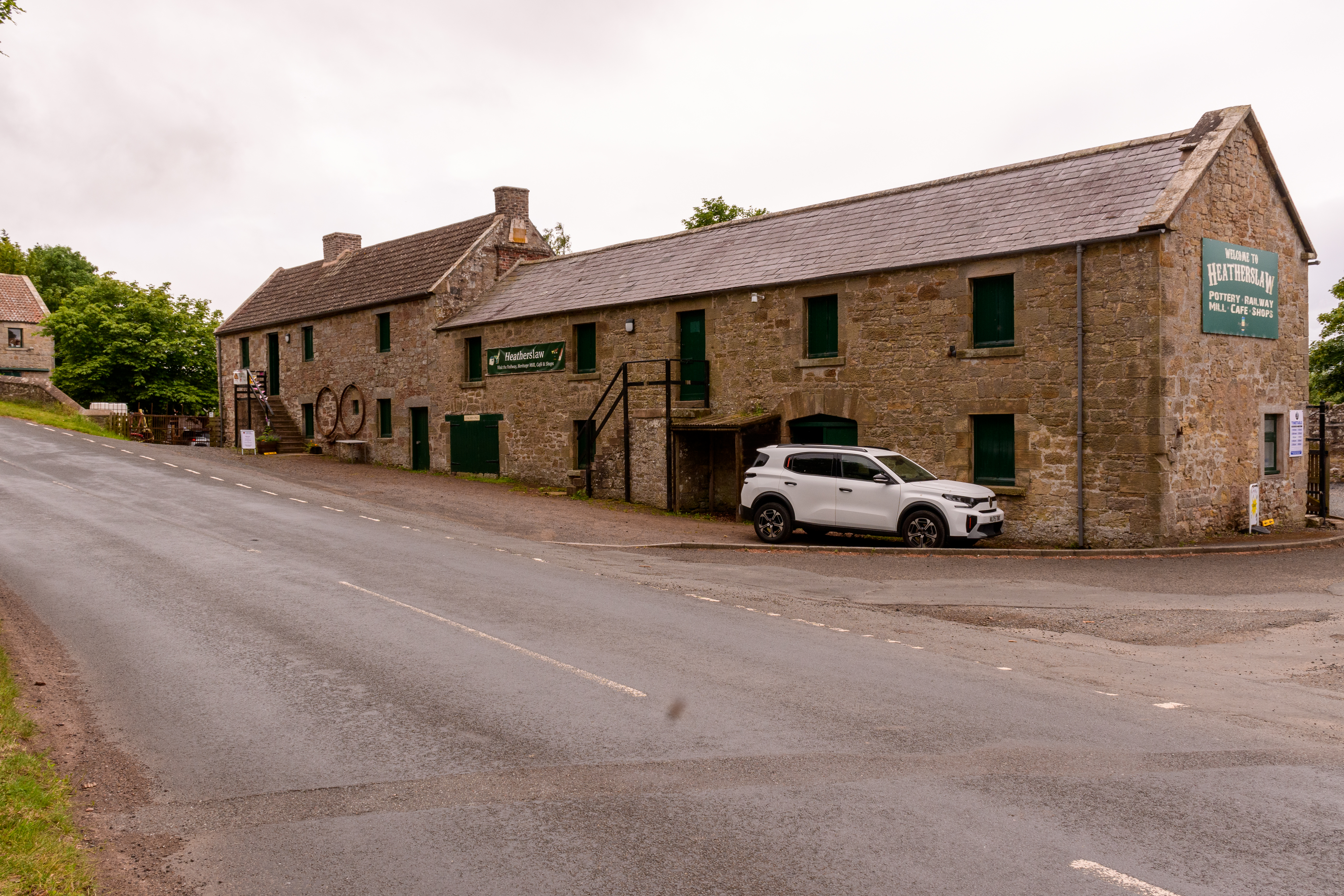
Ford Forge

Ford Forge (Ford Mill), Northumberland, England is located on the River Till between the villages of Ford and Etal. Buildings housing a water-powered forge were constructed at this site by 1770. Throughout the nineteenth century the forge was used to manufacture shovels for Northumberland collieries. William Hutchinson, a contemporary author writing about Sir John Hussey Delaval's Ford estate which included Ford Forge, commented as follows.

About a mile down the river, a Plating Forge was erected in 1769, where a large quantity of shovels, spades and other plate-iron works are made, as well for home consumption, as for exportation at the ports of Berwick, Newcastle, etc. The scheme, when carried to its intended extent, will be of great consequence to this part of the country. (from SINE project)
