= Etal Castle =

Castle in the United Kingdom

- Northumberland
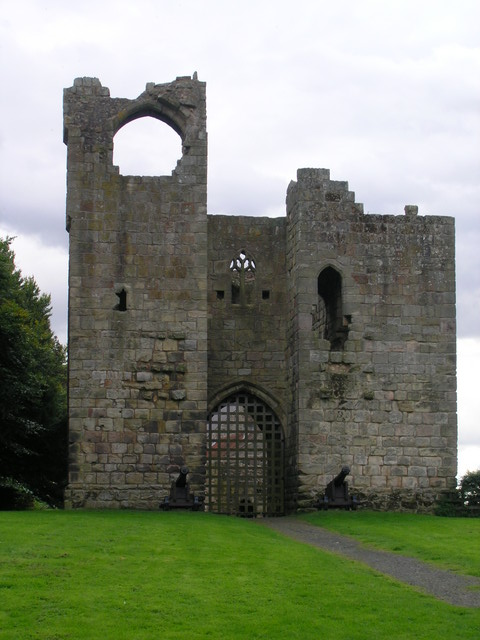
- The exterior of the gatehouse

Site information
- Owner: Joicey family, English Heritage
- Condition: Ruined

Location
- Coordinates: 55.648°N 2.121°W

Site history
- Materials: Sandstone
- Events: Anglo-Scottish border wars

Etal Castle is a ruined medieval fortification in the village of Etal, Northumberland, England. It was built around 1341 by Robert Manners, and comprised a residential tower, a gatehouse and a corner tower, protected by a curtain wall. The castle was involved both in local feuding and the border wars between England and Scotland. There was a battle between the rival Manners and Heron families outside the walls in 1428, and in 1513 it was briefly captured by King James IV of Scotland during his invasion of England.

The castle passed into the hands of the Crown in 1547 and was garrisoned as part of the border defences, but fell into disrepair and was abandoned as a military fortification after 1603. In the 18th century it ceased to be used as a domestic dwelling and became ruinous. In the 21st century the castle is owned by the Joicey family, but managed by English Heritage. Open to the public, it is protected under UK law as an ancient monument and a Grade I listed building.

== History ==
=== 14th–15th centuries ===
Etal Castle was built around 1341 by Robert Manners in the village of Etal, after Robert was granted a licence to crenellate by King Edward III in order to defend the location against the Scots. The Manners family had owned the manor since at least 1232.

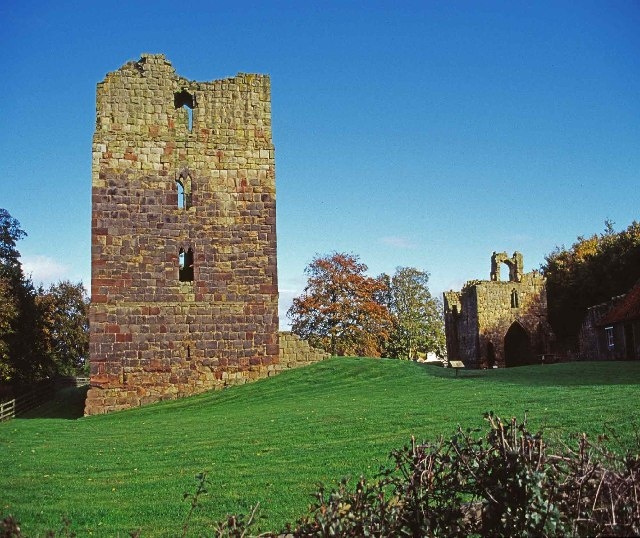
Residential tower (left), showing the lighter sandstone used in the upper levels, and the gatehouse (right)

The earliest part of the castle was its residential tower. This tower may have been built around 1341 on the site of an older, unfortified house owned by the family on the same site, incorporating part of the structure into the new, crenellated tower. Alternatively, the central tower may have been built at some point between the late 13th and early 14th centuries, complete with crenellations, in which case the licence from Edward III served only to allow Manners to extend the perimeter fortifications. By the 1350s, the castle was surrounded by a manor which included mills for corn and fulling, lime kilns and coal mines.

Work continued under Robert's son, John Manners, who inherited the property as a minor in 1354. In 1355, when Sir Edward de Letham acquired the wardship of the property, the site was described as a fortalice, a weakly defended location, but by 1368, when the wardship passed to Joan, his widow, it was considered to be a fully-fledged castle. De Letham was a powerful regional figure, and may have been granted the wardship by Edward III in order to retain his loyalty in the face of military advances by the Scots; he and his wife allegedly ran down the surrounding estate, resulting in a commission being established to investigate the abuses.

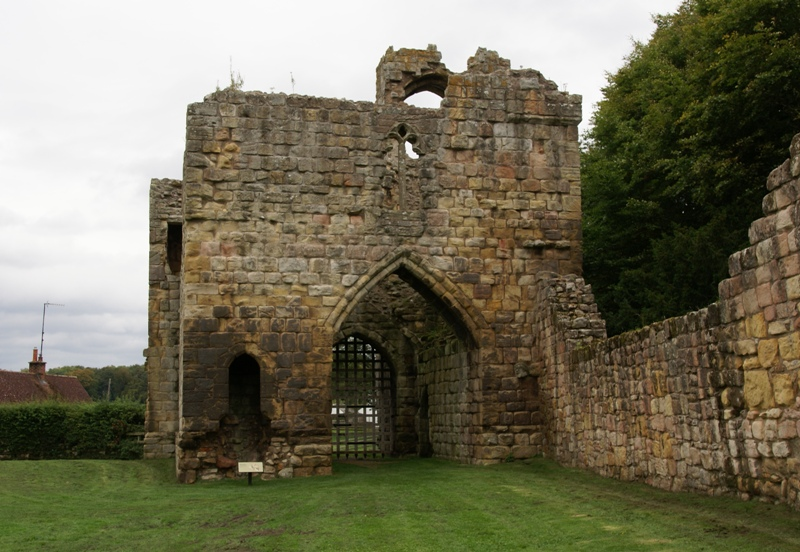
The interior side of the gatehouse

John Manners died in 1402, probably leaving the castle to his son, Robert, who in turn left the property to his own son, another John Manners. John was involved in a long-running feud with the neighbouring Heron family, who owned the neighbouring Ford Castle, and on 20 January 1428 there was a fight between the two sides outside Etal Castle, in which William Heron died. The precise events are unclear and formed the basis of a subsequent lawsuit, but John argued that William had assaulted the castle, during which attack he had died, and that John had no direct involvement in his death. William's widow blamed John and his eldest son, also called John, for William's death and demanded compensation. After arbitration by the Church, eventually John agreed to pay for 500 masses for William's soul, and to give 250 marks to his widow.

In 1438, another of John Manners' sons, Robert, inherited the castle and the estates. The lands had fallen in value considerably over the preceding years, as a result of the wars with the Scots, the feuding with the Herons and the poverty of the lands. Robert's son, another Robert Manners, inherited the property in 1464, and passed the castle onto his son, George, on his death in 1495. George inherited the title of Baron de Ros from his mother's side of the family and the castle was abandoned as a residence by the family around the end of the 15th century when the Manners moved closer to the royal court.

=== 16th century ===
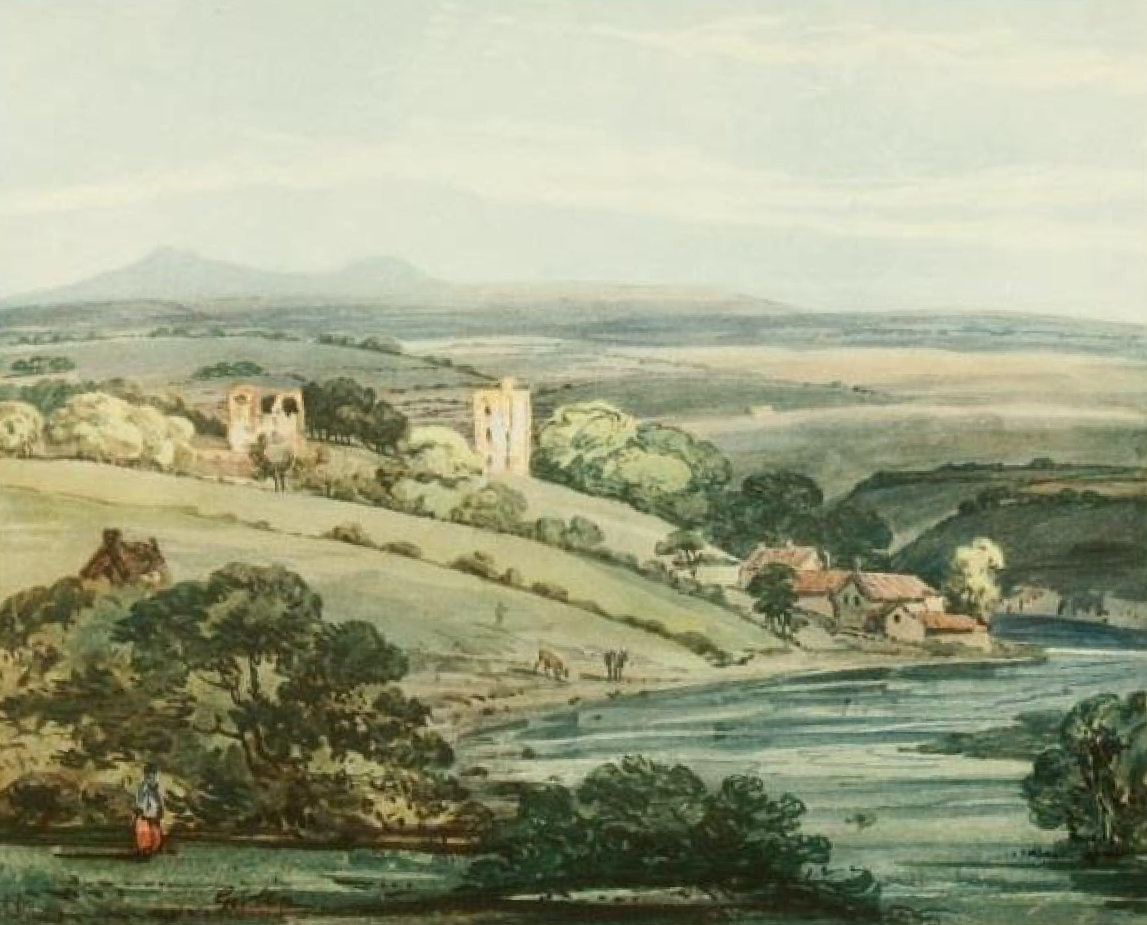
Thomas Girtin's 1797 painting of the castle

In the absence of the Manners, Etal Castle was managed by the Collingwood family, who gradually became the castle's hereditary constables, renting the demesne lands on the estate from the family as well. The castle was heavily involved in the border wars with Scotland, usually holding a garrison of 100 men and forming an important strategic defensive location, one step removed from the fortifications along the border itself.

In August 1513, James IV of Scotland invaded England with a large army; equipped with modern artillery, he took the border castles of Norham and Wark, and then moved south against Etal Castle. Etal surrendered quickly in the hope of avoiding being pillaged by James' army, but nonetheless it was at least partially slighted - deliberately damaged to prevent it being used as a defence.

After the English victory at the Battle of Flodden the following month, the castle was retaken, garrisoned and used by Lord Dacre to store the captured Scottish artillery, under the guard of Sir Philip Tilney. Lord Dacre went on to use the castle extensively in 1515 and 1516. In 1541, a royal commission reported that the castle and its buildings were "in very great decaye", recommending that the fortification should be repaired.

The Crown bought the castle from the Manners in 1547 in exchange for other estates in England, putting Sir John Elleker in charge of the property, along with a garrison of 100 horsemen and 200 foot soldiers. Within two years, however, the Collingwoods were once more acting as the castle constables, a position they would retain for the rest of the century. The castle remained important to the defence of the border but fell into in poor repair: in 1564 it was described as in poor condition, "scant able to lodge the captain"; in 1580 another report reiterated similar problems; and in 1584 commissioners wrote that the poor maintenance over many years had left it need of repairs in the order of £200. (Note: It is challenging to accurately compare 16th-century and modern financial sums. £200 in 1584 would be worth between £51,940 and £13,910,000 in 2013 terms, depending on the financial measure used.)

=== 17th–21st centuries ===
In 1603 James VI of Scotland inherited the kingdom of England, uniting the two thrones, and Etal Castle lost its military value and soon passed into private ownership. In 1636, the Earl of Suffolk sold it to a Scottish officer Sir Robert Carr, supposedly descended from Kerr of Greenhead, Roxburgh. It remained in the hands of the Carr family until the 19th century, by which time the castle had deteriorated. In the 18th century it ceased to be used as a residence, as the Carrs built a new manor house in the village in 1748. It remained in the hands of the Carrs until the 19th century.

The ruins were painted in watercolour by Thomas Girtin in 1797, based upon his visit to the castle in the autumn of 1796.

Lord Joicey bought the castle in 1908, and by 1922 the ruins had been cleaned of ivy and repointed. The castle was placed into the guardianship of the state in 1975, and archaeological excavations and surveys were carried out on the site in 1978, 1983, 1994 and 1998. In the 21st century it is managed by English Heritage, and protected under UK law as a Grade I listed building and as an ancient monument.

== Architecture ==
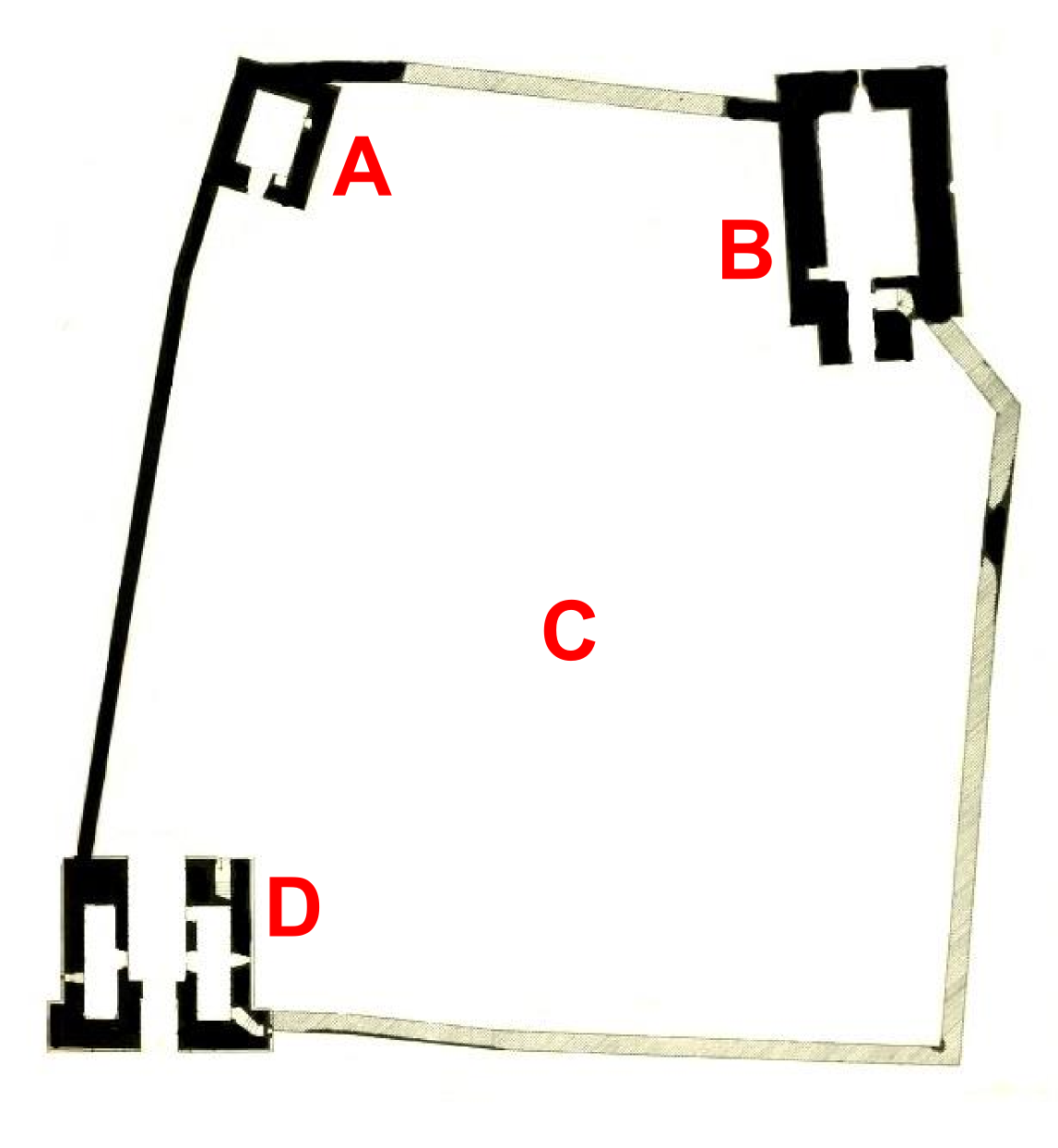
Plan of the castle: A – corner tower; B – residential tower; C – bailey; D – gatehouse

Etal Castle originally overlooked a bridge over the River Till, and was protected by the steep banks running to the river. The castle forms a rectangular enclosure, approximately 182 by 162 feet (55 by 49 m), protected by a well-made, but relatively thin, stone curtain wall, mostly 4 feet 6 inches (1.37 m) thick. Most of the wall above ground has since been destroyed, with only the foundations remaining.

The residential tower in the north-east corner was entered by a forebuilding, unusual in this region, 17 feet 6 inches by 7 feet 10 inches (5.33 by 2.39 m) in size and protected by a portcullis. Four storeys tall, each floor of the tower was reached by a spiral staircase and comprised two rooms, one large and one small chamber. The tower is built from sandstone; the forebuilding and uppermost floor are made of a lighter sandstone than the lower floors and may have been added retrospectively. The ground floor is 46 by 32 feet (14.0 by 9.8 m) and originally had a vaulted ceiling. The upper floors were well-lit with large, transomed windows, complete with window seats; the first and second floors were probably used by the Manners family and had large fireplaces, with the third floor used by the castle staff. The tower was possibly linked to a neighbouring hall complex by a doorway on the first floor, although any such complex has since been lost.

The gatehouse in the south-east corner is 36 feet (11 m) square, and its vaulted passageway was originally protected by a portcullis, gate and a drawbridge. On either side of the passageway were two vaulted guardrooms, 21 feet (6.4 m) long and up to 6 feet 8 inches (2.03 m) wide. On the first floor, since lost, there was a large chamber, 22 by 19 feet (6.7 by 5.8 m) wide, with an ancillary room, 7 feet 6 inches (2.29 m) square, and a doorway that led onto some form of forebuilding or platform. The gatehouse has what architectural historian Anthony Emery has described as "flamboyant window tracing", and the Manners' coat of arms are carved above the entrance to the gatehouse.

The north-west corner tower is 14 feet by 10 feet 6 inches (4.3 by 3.20 m) across on the inside, with an entrance door on the east side, and originally had a loft floor. It remains uncertain if there was a second corner tower built in the south-east corner of the castle complex; excavations in 1978 in one possible location failed to find any traces, and a geophysical survey in 1998 proved inconclusive.

== See also ==
- Castles in Great Britain and Ireland
- List of castles in England

== Bibliography ==
- Dodds, Derek (2005). Northumbria at War. Barnsley, UK: Pen and Sword Military. ISBN 978-1-84415-149-3.
- Emery, Anthony (1996). Greater Medieval Houses of England and Wales, 1300–1500: Volume 1, Northern England. Cambridge, UK: Cambridge University Press. ISBN 978-0-521-49723-7.
- Goodwin, George (2013). Fatal Rivalry, Flodden, 1513 : Henry VIII, James IV and the Battle for Renaissance Britain. New York, US: W. W. Norton. ISBN 978-0-393-07368-3.
- Harbottle, Barbara; Ellison, Margaret (2001). "An Excavation at Etal Castle, Northumberland, in 1978". Archaeologia Aeliana. 29: 235–252. ISSN 0261-3417. doi:10.5284/1061064
- King, Andy (2007). "Best of Enemies: Were the Fourteenth-Century Anglo-Scottish Marches a 'Frontier Society'?". In King, Andy; Penman, Michael (eds.). England and Scotland in the Fourteenth Century: New Perspectives. Woodbridge, UK: Boydell Press. pp. 116–135. ISBN 978-1-84383-318-5.
- Pettifer, Adrian (2002). English Castles: A Guide by Counties. Woodbridge, UK: Boydell Press. ISBN 978-0-85115-782-5.
- Sadler, John; Serdiville, Rosie (2013). The Battle of Flodden 1513. Stroud, UK: Stroud History Press. ISBN 978-0-7524-6537-1.
- Vickers, Kenneth Hotham (1922). The History of Northumberland, Volume XI: The Parishes of Carham, Branxton, Kirknewton, Wooler, and Ford. Newcastle-upon-Tyne, UK: A. Reid, Sons and Company. OCLC 83541715.
