= Petroleum Act 1879 =

Act of the Parliament of the United Kingdom

Petroleum Act 1879 (Note: Section 1.)
- Act of Parliament
- Parliament of the United Kingdom
- Long title: An Act to continue and amend the Petroleum Act, 1871.
- Citation: 42 & 43 Vict. c. 47
- Territorial extent: United Kingdom

Dates
- Royal assent: 11 August 1879
- Commencement: 31 December 1879 (Note: Section 5.)
- Repealed: 4 August 1928
Other legislation
Amends	Petroleum Act 1871
Amended by	Petroleum Act 1926
Repealed by	Petroleum (Consolidation) Act 1928

Status: Repealed

Text of statute as originally enacted

The Petroleum Act 1879 (42 & 43 Vict. c. 47) was an act of the Parliament of the United Kingdom which continued and amended the Petroleum Act 1871 (34 & 35 Vict. c. 105).

== Background ==
The storage and transport of petroleum and petroleum products had been controlled by the Petroleum Acts 1862 to 1871. By 1879 the provisions of the 1871 act needed to be updated.

The Petroleum Act 1871 (34 & 35 Vict. c. 105) was time-limited and expired on 1 October 1872 (1871 act Section 18). The 1871 act was continued by annual statutes until 1879. Section 4 of the Petroleum Act 1879 enacted that the 1871 act would continue in force until otherwise directed by Parliament.

The 1871 act had defined petroleum as a substance that gives off "an inflammable [flammable] vapour at less than 100 °F" (37.8 °C), though a more stringent standard later redefined petroleum as anything giving off a flammable vapour at less than 73 °F (22.8 °C). The test equipment and test methods required to determine the flammable vapour temperature were modified as defined in schedule 1 of the 1879 act. The act mandated use of the Abel test developed by the chemist Frederick Abel at the government's request.

== Provisions ==
The act received royal assent on 11 August 1879. Its long title is 'An Act to continue and amend the Petroleum Act 1871'. The act comprises six sections and two schedules:

- Section 1. Short title and construction
- Section 2. Alteration of test
- Section 3. Verification of test apparatus
- Section 4. Continuance of the Petroleum Act 1871
- Section 5. Commencement (31 December 1879)
- Section 6. Repeal of Part of the Petroleum Act 1871
- Schedule 1. Mode of testing petroleum so as to ascertain the temperature at which it will give off inflammable vapour
- Schedule 2. Act repealed: 1871 Act from Section 3 to the end of section 18.

== Subsequent developments ==
The Conservators of the River Thames made bye-laws under the 1879 Act prohibiting any ship carrying petroleum from approaching London west of Thames Haven.

The 1871 and 1879 acts remained in force until they were repealed for the United Kingdom by section 26(3) of, and schedule 3 to, the Petroleum (Consolidation) Act 1928 (18 & 19 Geo. 5. c. 32), which came into force on 4 August 1928.

The 1879 act applied to Ireland and remained a statute of the Republic of Ireland until 1972 when it was repealed by the Dangerous Substances Act 1972.

== See also ==
- Petroleum Act
