= Baron Joicey =

Title in the Peerage of the United Kingdom

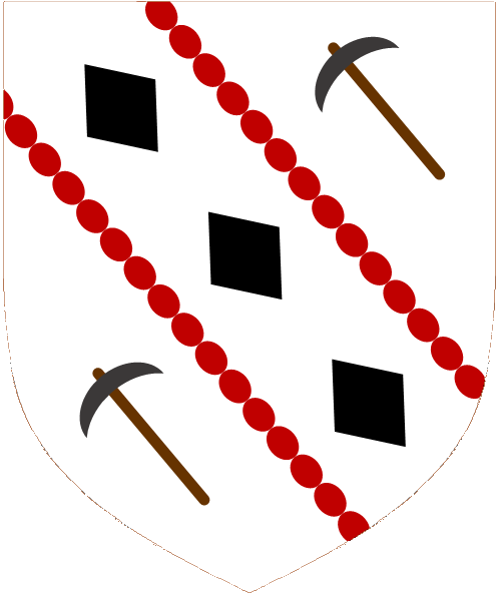
- Arms of Barons Joicey
- Creation date: 1906
- Status: extant
- Motto: Omne Solum Forti Patria, Anywhere is home to the brave
- Arms: Argent three lozenges Sable within two bendlets invected Gules between two miners' picks in bend Proper
- Crest: A demi-man affrontée in armour Proper, garnished Or, the helmet adorned with three feathers Gules, holding in the dexter hand a scimitar of the first, pommel and hilt Gold, supporting with the sinister hand an escutcheon Argent, charged with three torteaux within two bendlets invected of the second between two fleurs-de-lis Sable
- Supporters: On either side a Shetland pony Proper, haltered Or

Baron Joicey, of Chester-le-Street in the County of Durham, is a title in the Peerage of the United Kingdom. It was created in 1906 for the coal mining magnate Sir James Joicey, 1st Baronet, Member of Parliament for Chester-le-Street from 1885. He had already been created a baronet, of Longhirst and of Ulgham, both in the County of Northumberland, in the Baronetage of the United Kingdom on 3 July 1893.

He was succeeded by his eldest son, the 2nd Baron. He was High Sheriff of County Durham in 1910. The 2nd Baron lost his only son young, and on his death his younger brother succeeded as 3rd Baron. He was an army officer who commanded the 1st Battalion Suffolk Regiment World War I. He was succeeded by his younger son, the 4th Baron. As of 2026, the titles are held by the latter's eldest son, the 5th Baron, who succeeded in 1993.

The family seat is Etal Manor on the Ford Castle and Etal Castle estate.

== Barons Joicey (1906) ==
- James Joicey, 1st Baron Joicey (1846–1936)
- James Arthur Joicey, 2nd Baron Joicey (1880–1940)
- Hugh Edward Joicey, 3rd Baron Joicey (1881–1966), second son of the 1st Baron
- Michael Edward Joicey, 4th Baron Joicey (1925–1993)
- James Michael Joicey, 5th Baron Joicey (born 1953)

The heir apparent is the present holder's son the Hon. William James Joicey (born 1990).

== Extended family ==
John Joicey, uncle of the first Baron, was a Liberal politician and coal owner.

Baronetage of the United Kingdom
Preceded by Holden baronets	Joicey baronets of Longhirst and Ulgham; 3 July 1893	Succeeded by Pulley baronets
