= Louisa Beresford, Marchioness of Waterford =

English painter (1818–1891)

The Most Honourable The Marchioness of Waterford
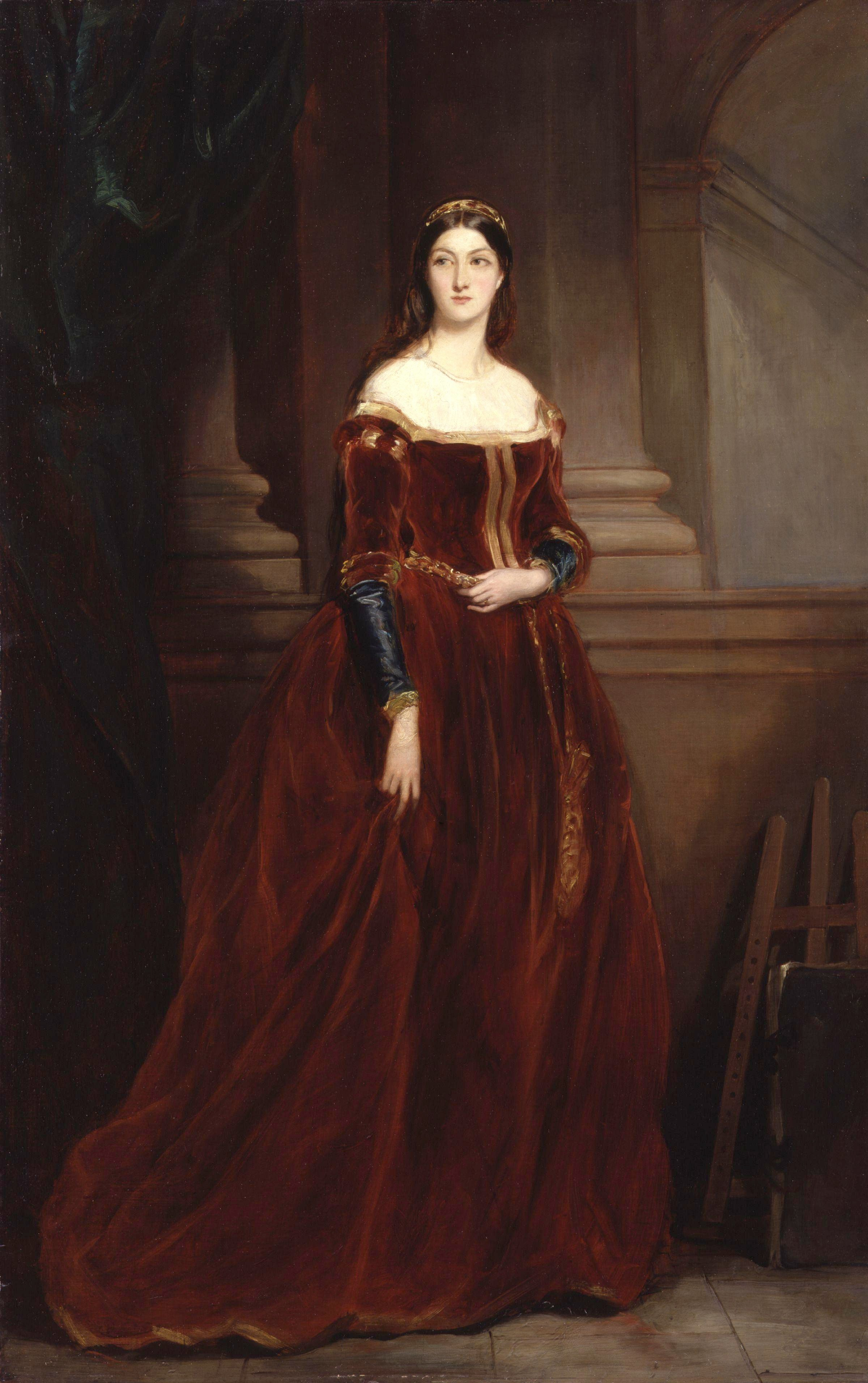
- Portrait by Sir Francis Grant
- Born: Louisa Anne Stuart; 14 April 1818; Paris, France
- Died: 12 May 1891 (aged 73); Ford Castle, England
- Resting place: Church of St Michael and All Angels, Ford, Northumberland
- Spouse: Henry Beresford, 3rd Marquess of Waterford

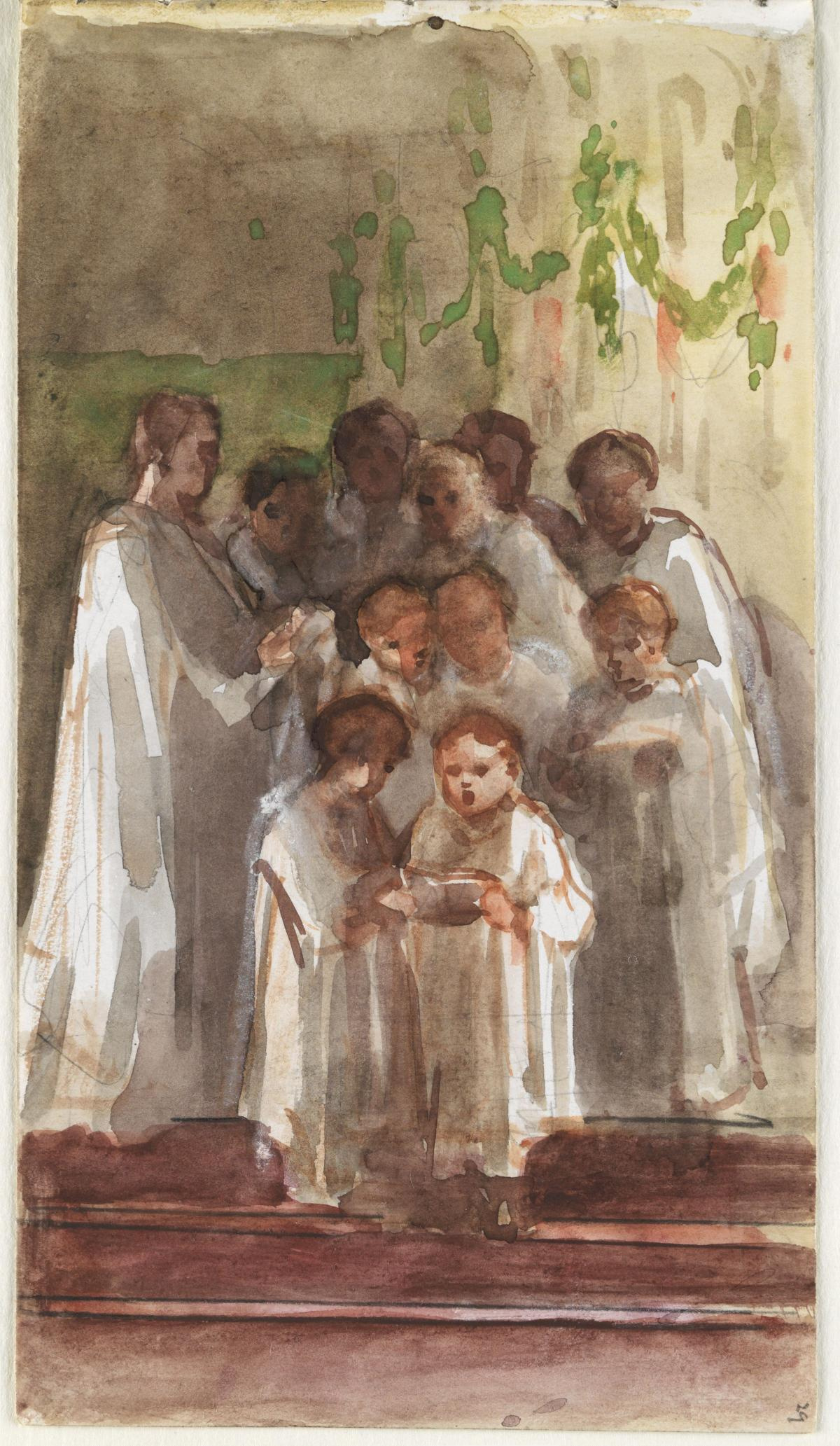
Choir singing on Christmas Day 25 December 1887

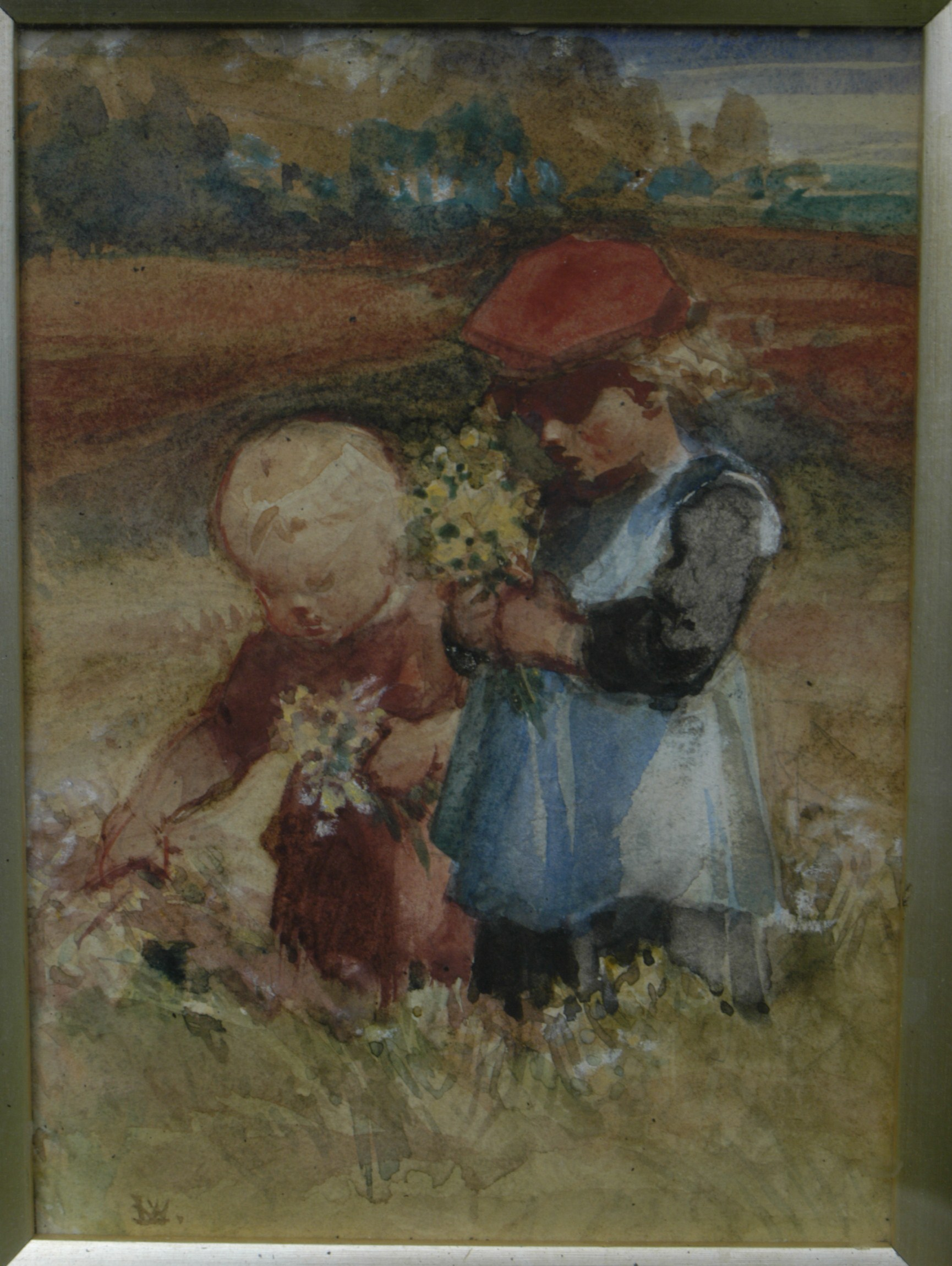
A small watercolour by Lady Waterford

Louisa Anne Beresford, Marchioness of Waterford (née Stuart; 14 April 1818 – 12 May 1891) was a British Pre-Raphaelite watercolourist and philanthropist.

== Biography ==
Born in Paris, she was the daughter of Charles Stuart, 1st Baron Stuart de Rothesay and the former Lady Elizabeth Margaret Yorke. Louisa's elder sister was Charlotte Canning, Countess Canning.

The family home was at Highcliffe Castle in Dorset, and had been in Stuart possession since about 1770 when Louisa's great-grandfather, John Stuart, 3rd Earl of Bute (a founder of Kew Gardens), while out botanising, discovered the cliff-top viewsite overlooking Christchurch Bay, and commissioned the architect Robert Adam, to design High Cliff, a sumptuous Georgian mansion, with grounds laid out by Capability Brown.

His fourth son, Lieutenant-General Sir Charles Stuart, inherited High Cliff, but landslips virtually destroyed the house, and he sold the greater part of the estate. Years later Louisa's father, who had had a long and distinguished career, been honoured with a knighthood, and raised to the peerage by George IV in 1828, bought back the land and between 1831 and 1835 built the house that became known as Highcliffe Castle, and which has been described as "the most important remaining example of the Romantic Picturesque style of architecture."

Charles Stuart made use of the architect William Donthorne, a founder member of the Royal Institute of British Architects, to design Highcliffe Castle. Incorporated in the design was carved medieval stonework from the Norman Benedictine Abbey of St Peter at Jumièges and from the Grande Maison des Les Andelys, both of which structures had fallen into disrepair after the French Revolution. Also included in the structure were a 16th-century oriel window and stained glass window.

Her father was appointed British Ambassador at Paris shortly before marrying Elizabeth Margaret Yorke on 6 February 1816. Louisa's childhood in Paris was marked by the early tuition she received in the arts, in keeping with being a great-granddaughter of the writer Lady Mary Wortley Montagu. Art, religion, and philanthropy would feature prominently in her life. Despite being an accomplished amateur artist, her paintings did not appear in galleries until the 1870s. Showing great concern for the welfare of her tenants on her Northumberland property, she redesigned the village of Ford, designed and built a school, and founded a temperance society. Over a period of 22 years between 1860 and 1882, she decorated the school hall with life-sized watercolours on paper, which had been applied to canvas and mounted on the interior walls and gables. The images portrayed biblical scenes, and used the village residents as models. The village school was in use until 1957, but is now known as the Waterford Gallery or Lady Waterford Hall.

Gleeson White described her talent in his work Children's Books and Their Illustrators

In the designs by Louisa, Marchioness of Waterford, one encounters genius with absolutely faltering technique; and many who know how rare is the slightest touch of genius, forgive the equally important mastery of material which must accompany it to produce work of lasting value.

Louisa was tutored by Dante Gabriel Rossetti and attended drawing classes held by John Ruskin, together with Lady Trevelyan and Kate Greenaway, and had introduced Rose La Touche to him. It is believed that she modelled for Sir John Everett Millais in several of his works, and her beauty has been accredited as one of the inspirations of the Pre-Raphaelite Brotherhood.

On 8 June 1842 she married Henry Beresford, 3rd Marquess of Waterford, and settled in Curraghmore House in County Waterford, until he died in a horse riding accident in 1859. The marriage produced no children.

The erosion losses at Highcliffe were considerable and had been reckoned at about a yard a year – the coast path was in constant need of maintenance due to cliff falls. Louisa wrote in her Recollections to the age of 12 that part of the problem was landsliding in the clays and to combat this she introduced an extensive drainage system in the cliffs to keep the clays dry. In about 1880 the problems of erosion of Highcliffe prompted her to seek an engineering solution. A prime cause was The Run, the river outflow from Christchurch Harbour, which because of its proximity to the cliffs, greatly increased the erosion. She arranged for the placing of limestone and granite-porphyry blocks near the Castle, with the idea of deflecting the course of The Run rather than directly opposing it. This groyne eventually disappeared and by 1931 only a few of the blocks were still visible at low tide.

In his 1893 work, the Victorian biographer, Augustus Hare (1834–1903), wrote The story of two noble lives : being memorials of Charlotte, Countess Canning, and Louisa, Marchioness of Waterford –

Of the life of the younger sister, Louisa, Lady Waterford, the want of material makes it impossible to give the detailed account which might be looked for. She left scarcely any journals, and all her correspondence with her husband and most of that with her mother and sister, has been destroyed. From scattered letters which remain, and from the recollection of those who loved her best, it has been only possible to construct a fragmentary memorial. Those who were much in the sunshine of her gracious presence need no reminder of what she was: her noble simplicity of character, her playful humour, her warm interest, her gentle sympathy, her utter forgetfulness of self, her enthusiasm for all things good and beautiful, must be ever present with them. But it has been thought that there are many outside the quiet circle in which she lived, who may care to know the little that can be told of one who might be described by Longfellow's lines –

"Homeward serenely she walked with God's benediction upon her:

When she had passed it seemed like the ceasing of exquisite music"

— Augustus Hare

She died at Ford Castle on 12 May 1891. Her grave lies next to the Church of St Michael in Ford Village. Its stone was designed in 1891 by George Frederic Watts, and the slab by Watts's wife Mary Seton Watts. It is a Grade II Listed Building protected by law.

== Sources ==
- Lady Mary Wortley Montagu and Her Times – George Paston, books.google.co.za; accessed 11 May 2016.

== Bibliography ==
- Sublime & instructive; letters from John Ruskin to Louisa, Marchioness of Waterford, Anna Blunden and Ellen Heaton – Virginia Surtees (1972)
- The story of two noble lives: being memorials of Charlotte, Countess Canning, and Louisa, Marchioness of Waterford – Augustus Hare (1893)
- Neville, H.M. Under a Border tower: sketches and memories of Ford castle, Northumberland, and its surroundings, with a memoir of its late noble châtelaine, Louisa marchioness of Waterford; Newcastle upon Tyne, Mawson, Swan, & Morgan, 1896.
- The Stuarts of Highcliffe – Robert Franklin
