= Twizell Bridge =

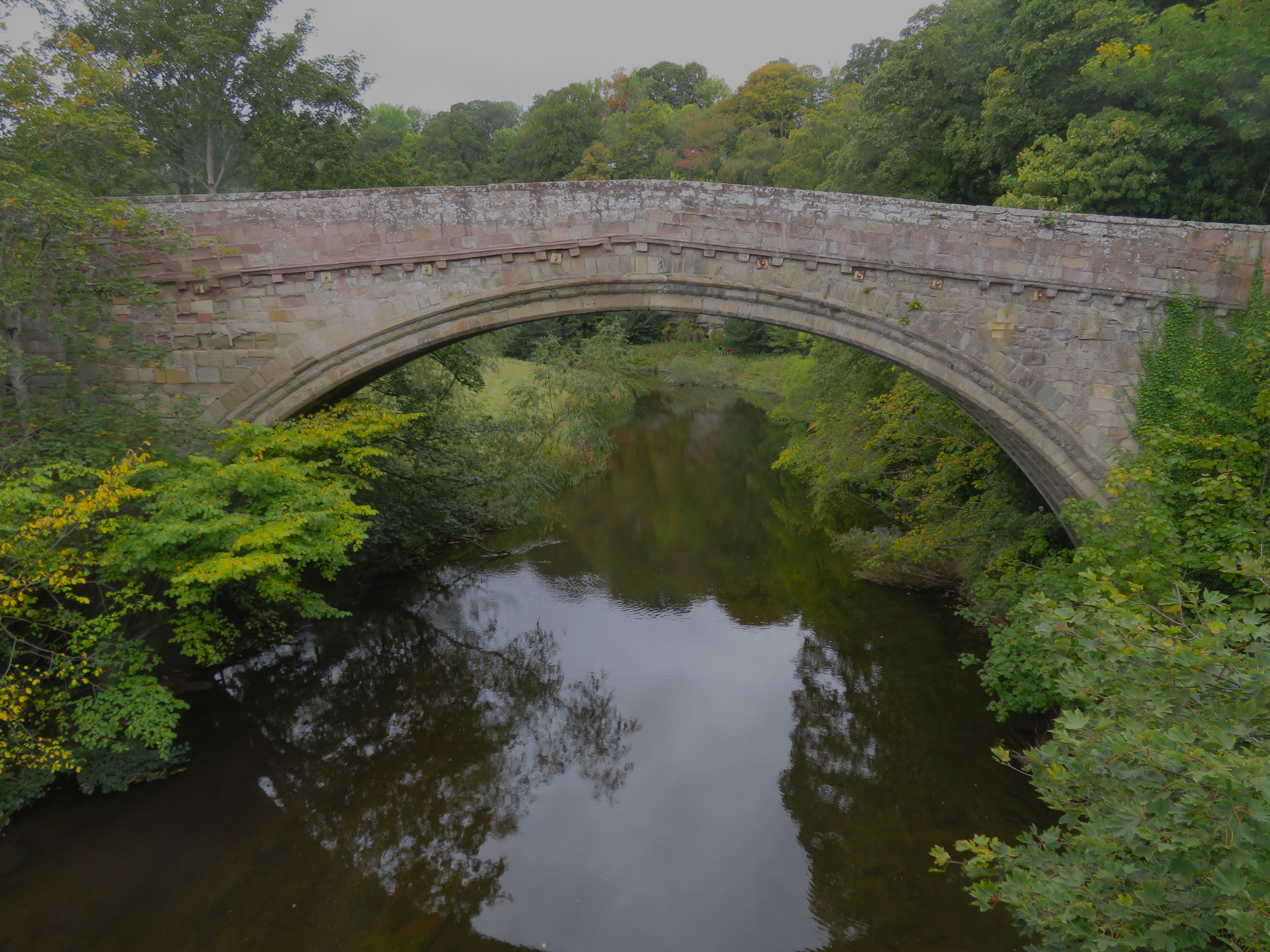
- Twizell Bridge viewed from the south
- Coordinates: 55°41′N 02°11′W
- Carries: Pedestrians since 1983
- Crosses: River Till
- Locale: Northumberland, England
- Heritage status: Scheduled monument and grade II* listed

Characteristics
- Design: Arch bridge
- Width: 4.6 m (15 ft)
- Longest span: 27.4 m (90 ft)
- Clearance above: 12.2 m (40 ft)

History
- Opened: 1511
- Closed: 1983 (to vehicular traffic)

Location
- Interactive map of Twizell Bridge

Twizell Bridge (also spelt Twizel Bridge) is a Tudor arch bridge which crosses the River Till near Duddo, Northumberland in the Northeast of England. It is a Grade I listed building and a Scheduled Ancient Monument and no longer carries vehicular traffic. The bridge played a role in the Battle of Flodden in 1513.

== History ==
Twizel Bridge was built in 1511, when it provided the only dry crossing over the River Till between its confluence with the River Tweed and the village of Etal some 5 miles (8 kilometres) to the southeast. It was the longest stone span of any bridge in England for three centuries. Local legend suggests that it was built by a lady of the Selby family, whose seat was Twizell Castle nearby. The bridge is described by the antiquary Francis Grose in his 1784 book, The Antiquities of England and Wales, as "Twisle Bridge of Stone, one bow, but greate and stronge".

On the morning of 9 September 1513, the English army commanded by Thomas Howard, Earl of Surrey undertook a march northwards to outflank the invading Scottish army commanded by James IV of Scotland, which was encamped at Flodden Hill. The English artillery train and vanguard under Edmund Howard crossed the Till at Twizel Bridge, while the main English force crossed by fords and smaller bridges upstream. By making this manoeuvre, Surrey forced King James to abandon his secure position on Flodden Hill and the resulting battle that afternoon was fought on ground which was disadvantageous to the Scottish tactics and contributed to their defeat.

Alterations in 1770 and 1820 added small flood arches and a rebuilt parapet with a decorative dentil cornice. The bridge carried the main A698 road from Hawick to Berwick-upon-Tweed until 1983, when a modern bridge was completed immediately to the south.
