= Abel test =

The Abel test is a method developed by the British chemist Frederick Abel (1827–1902) to determine the flash point of a given sample of petroleum in order to ascertain the temperature at which it could safely be stored or used.

The test was mandated by the British Petroleum Act 1879, which fixed the minimum flash point for general and commercial use at 73 °F (23 °C; 296 K).
