= Wooler Water =

River in Northumberland, England

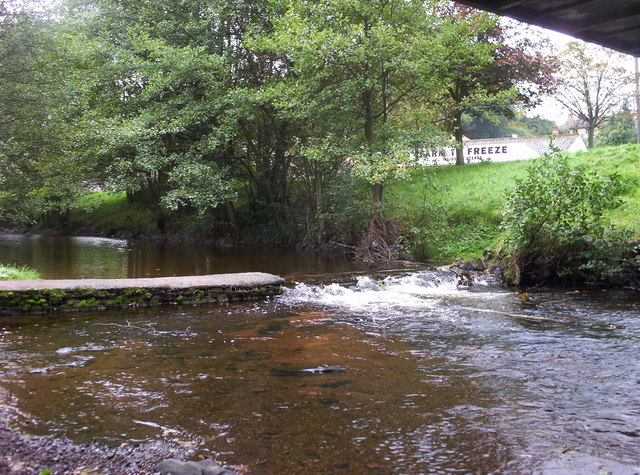
- Wooler Water near Wooler

- Location of mouth within Northumberland

Location
- Country: United Kingdom
- County: Northumberland

Physical characteristics
- Mouth
  - location: River Till
  - coordinates: 55.5656°N 1.9975°W
- Length: 20 km (12 mi)

Wooler Water is a stream that flows through Wooler in Northumberland, England. It is a tributary of the River Till and is 12 miles (20 km) in length. Its main tributary is the Harthope Burn.
