= Ford, Northumberland =

Village in Northumberland, England

Coordinates: 55.631°N 2.085°W

Ford
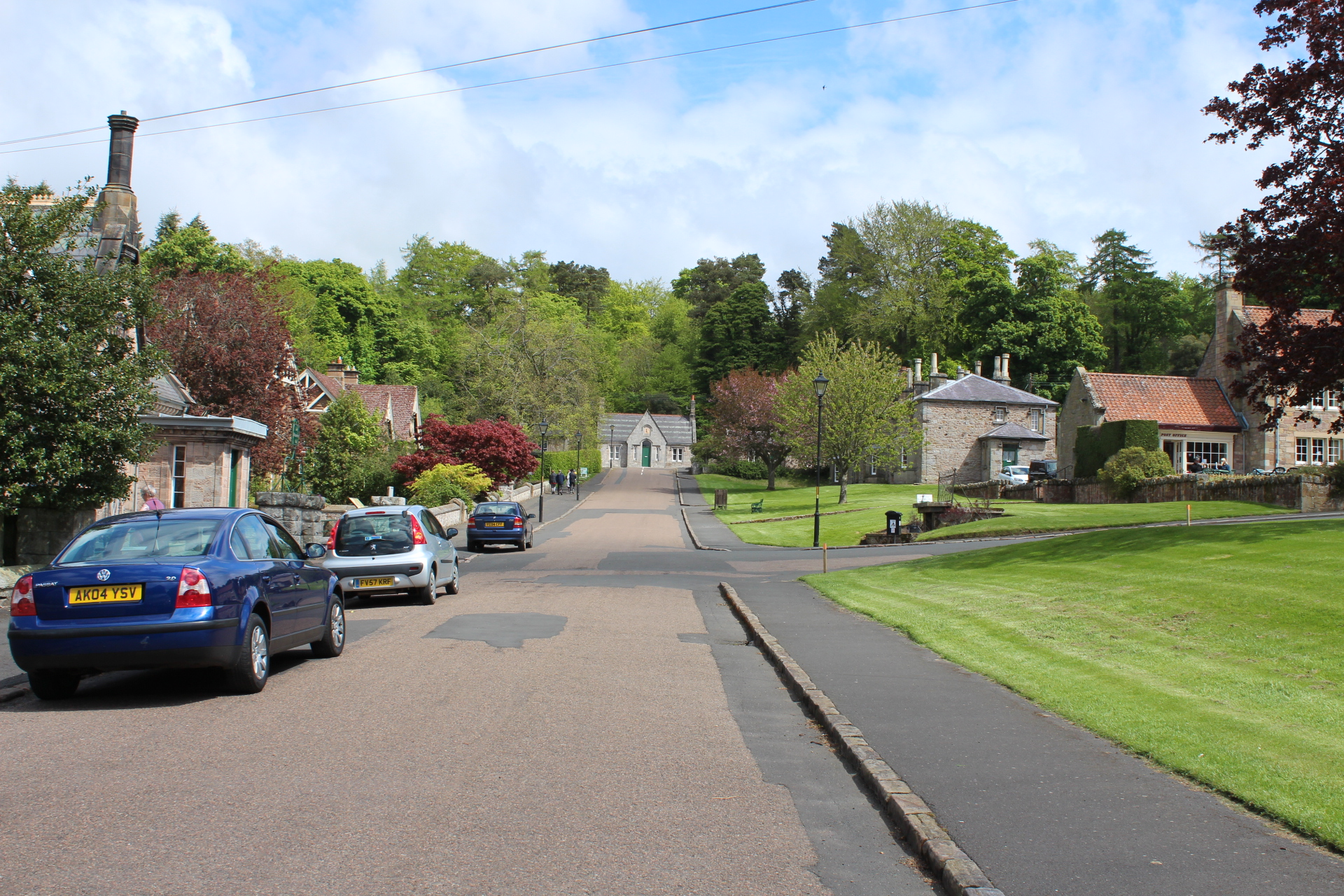
- Ford village

- Location within Northumberland
- Population: 493 (2011 census)
- OS grid reference: NT945375
- Unitary authority: Northumberland
- Ceremonial county: Northumberland
- Region: North East
- Country: England
- Sovereign state: United Kingdom
- Post town: Cornhill-on-Tweed
- Postcode district: TD12
- Dialling code: 01890
- Police: Northumbria
- Fire: Northumberland
- Ambulance: North East
- UK Parliament: North Northumberland

Ford is a small village and civil parish in Northumberland, England, about 13 miles (21 km) from Berwick-upon-Tweed. The parish also includes Etal.

== History before 1513 ==
Very little is known of the history of the area before the Norman Conquest in the 11th century, but Bronze Age rock carvings in the area suggest that there might have been some settlement at that time.

It is thought the shallow crossing of the River Till (a ford) which gave the village its name, was probably a crossing place for monks and nuns travelling between the monasteries at Iona and Lindisfarne during the Anglo-Saxon period.

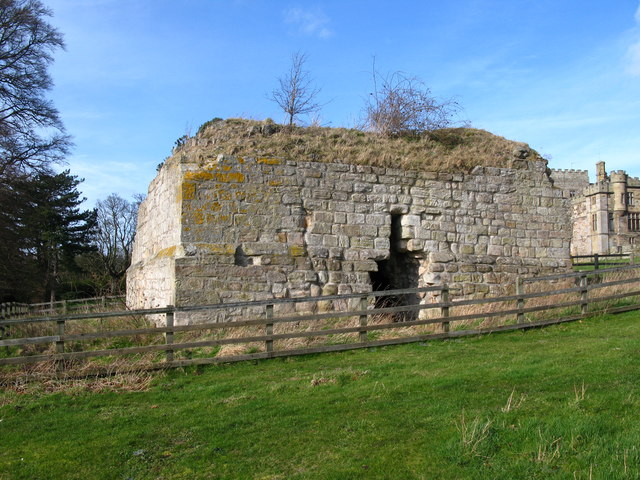
Parsons Tower, Ford

Written records for Ford begin after the Norman Conquest in 1066 and the introduction of the manorial system when the manor of Ford was held by the Heron family. A substantial stone castle was built at Ford in 1287 by Sir William Heron, to protect the manor from the constant border warfare waged between the Scots and the English during the medieval period. South-west of the castle are the remains of the Parson's Tower, a medieval pele tower which was once the home of the local parson.

St Michael's Church dates from the 13th century and is Grade II* listed.

In 1513, James IV of Scotland made his base at Ford Castle, prior to the Battle of Flodden, the biggest battle between the two nations. James was killed, along with 9,000 of his men.

== History after 1513 ==
After Flodden, peace came to the area and by the 19th century, Ford was a thriving agricultural and forestry community. Ford Castle had been rebuilt in the 1760s and, in 1859, Louisa, Marchioness of Beresford inherited Ford Estate on the death of her husband, the 3rd Marquess (who in turn, had inherited it from his mother, Susanna, Marchioness of Waterford). Lady Louisa Waterford, a gifted amateur watercolorist with an interest in the welfare of the tenants on the estate, rebuilt the village. A new school was built which today is the Lady Waterford Hall, decorated with wall paintings by Lady Waterford (opens daily at 10.30 am).

The 12th-century church of St Michael and All Angels was under the patronage of the Marquess of Waterford. It was restored in 1853 by John Dobson and a new reredos added by W S Hicks in 1892.

The estate was bought by James Joicey, 1st Baron Joicey in 1907 and it remains in the ownership of the Joicey family today. The castle was used as a convalescent hospital by the Red Cross during the Second World War and is now leased by the Northumberland County Council who use it as an educational camp. The castle is not open to the public except on special open days.

== Today ==
Much of the employment in Ford is connected in one way or another with the Ford and Etal Estate. There is a primary school, Hugh Joicey Church of England First School, and a village shop, which doubles as a Post Office. There are also several businesses connected with tourism, such as plant nurseries, a gift shop, a second-hand book dealer and some bed and breakfast establishments.

== See also ==
- Ford Moss
