= Lady Waterford Hall =

Building in Ford, Northumberland, England

Coordinates: 55°37′55″N 2°05′08″W

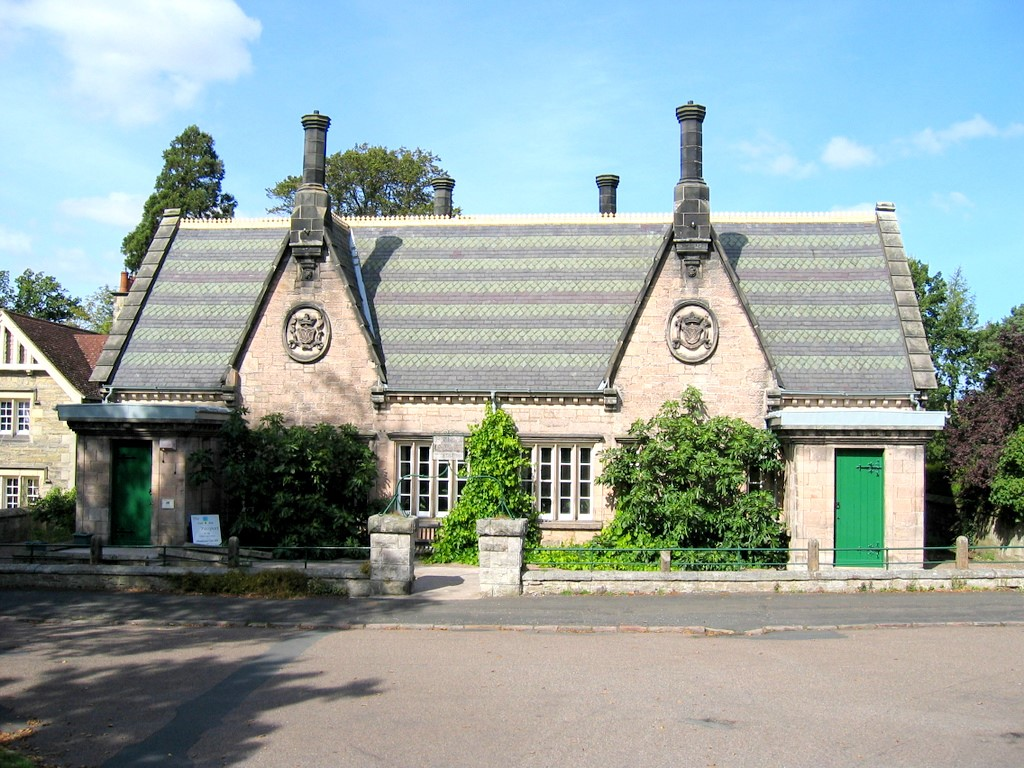
- Former names: Ford Village School

General information
- Status: Village hall
- Architectural style: Tudor revival
- Location: Ford, Northumberland, England
- Completed: 1860

Technical details
- Structural system: Stone with slate roof

Design and construction
- Designations: Grade II* listed building

Lady Waterford Hall is the former village school of the estate village of Ford, Northumberland. It is now used as the village hall and is a Grade II* listed building.

The hall was built as a school in 1860 by Louisa Beresford, Marchioness of Waterford, who inherited the village after the death of her husband. It is constructed in a Tudor style of stone with a slate roof. The 9-bay roof is supported by scissor braces.

The interior walls are decorated throughout with murals on biblical themes painted by Lady Louisa herself, a gifted amateur artist, using the schoolchildren and local villagers as models. They were painted over a 20-year period on paper and affixed to the walls. At the east end is a large "Jesus in the midst of the doctors" and at the west end a large "Suffer little children to come unto me".

It was used as a school until 1957 and at its peak housed 134 children. Now used as a village hall, it is available for hire, but otherwise open to view from 10.30 a.m.

== Gallery ==
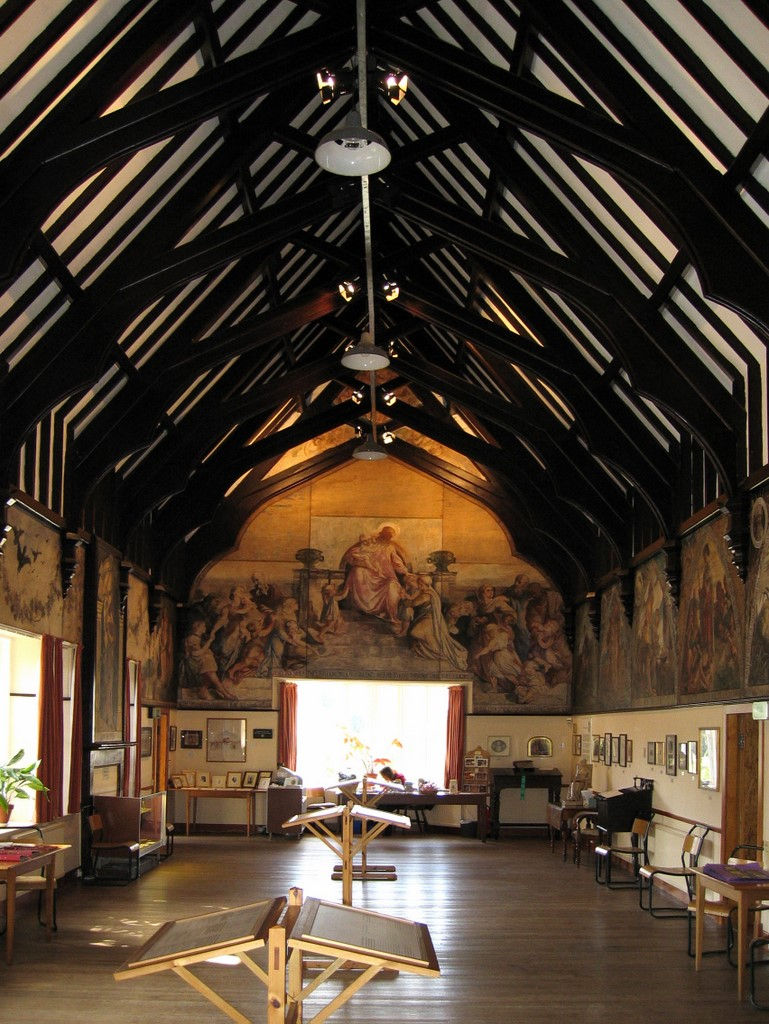
Hall interior
