= Holden baronets of Oakworth House (1893) =

Escutcheon of the Holden baronets of Oakworth House

The Holden Baronetcy, of Oakworth House in Keighley in the County of York, was created in the Baronetage of the United Kingdom on 1 July 1893 for the inventor, manufacturer and Liberal politician Isaac Holden. He had previously represented Knaresborough, Northern West Riding of Yorkshire and Keighley in Parliament.

His eldest son, the 2nd Baronet, represented Bradford East and Buckrose in the House of Commons. On 4 July 1908, he was raised to the peerage as Baron Holden, of Alston in the County of Cumberland. The barony became extinct on the death of his grandson, the 3rd Baron, on 6 July 1951; the baronetcy was passed on to his second cousin once removed, the 5th Baronet. He was the son of Edward Holden, a younger son of the 1st Baronet.

== Holden baronets, of Oakworth House (1893) ==
- Sir Isaac Holden, 1st Baronet (1807–1897)
- Sir Angus Holden, 2nd Baronet (1833–1912) (created Baron Holden in 1908)

== Barons Holden (1908) ==
- Angus Holden, 1st Baron Holden (1833–1912)
- Ernest Illingworth Holden, 2nd Baron Holden (1867–1937)
- Angus William Eden Holden, 3rd Baron Holden (1898–1951)

== Holden baronets, of Oakworth House (1893; Reverted) ==
- Sir Isaac Holden Holden, 5th Baronet (1867–1962)
- Sir Edward Holden, 6th Baronet (1916–2003)
- Sir Paul Holden, 7th Baronet (1923-2016)
- Sir Michael Peter Holden, 8th Baronet (born 1956).

The heir presumptive is Peter Ritson Holden (born 1933), a kinsman of the present holder.

== Notes ==
Baronetage of the United Kingdom
Preceded by Abel baronets	Holden baronets of Oakworth House; 1 July 1893	Succeeded by Joicey baronets
