= Frederick Abel =

English chemist (1827–1902)

Sir Frederick Abel Bt, GCVO, KCB, FRS
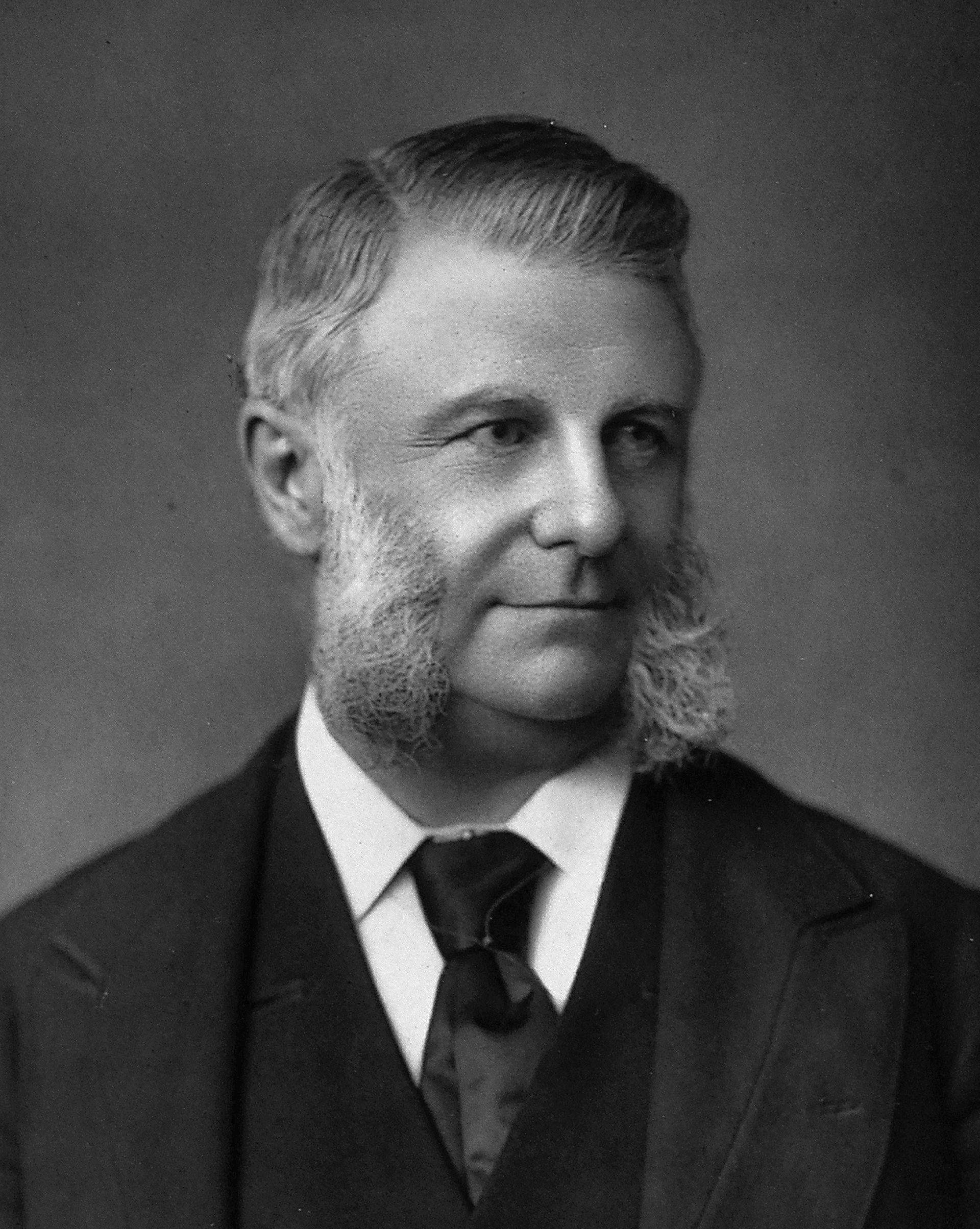
- Born: 17 July 1827; London, England
- Died: 6 September 1902 (aged 75); Whitehall Court, London, England
- Education: Royal Polytechnic Institution; Royal College of Chemistry
- Known for: Cordite
- Awards: Royal Medal (1877); Albert Medal (1891)
- Scientific career
- Fields: Chemistry
- Doctoral advisor: A. W. von Hofmann

Sir Frederick Augustus Abel, 1st Baronet (17 July 1827 – 6 September 1902) was an English chemist who was recognised as the leading British authority on explosives. He is best known for the invention of cordite as a replacement for gunpowder in firearms.

== Education ==
Born in London as son of Johann Leopold Abel, Abel studied chemistry at the Royal Polytechnic Institution and in 1845 became one of the original 26 students of A. W. von Hofmann at the Royal College of Chemistry (now a constituent of Imperial College London). In 1852 he was appointed lecturer in chemistry at the Royal Military Academy, Woolwich, succeeding Michael Faraday, who had held that post since 1829.

== Early career ==
From 1854 until 1888 Abel served as ordnance chemist at the Chemical Establishment of the Royal Arsenal at Woolwich, establishing himself as the leading British authority on explosives. Three years later was appointed chemist to the War Department and chemical referee to the government. During his tenure of this office, which lasted until 1888, he carried out a large amount of work in connection with the chemistry of explosives.

== Notable work ==
One of the most important of his investigations had to do with the manufacture of guncotton, and he developed a process, consisting essentially of reducing the nitrated cotton to fine pulp, which enabled it to be safely manufactured and at the same time yielded the product in a form that increased its usefulness. This work to an important extent prepared the way for the "smokeless powders" which came into general use towards the end of the 19th century; cordite, the type adopted by the British government in 1891, was invented jointly by him and Sir James Dewar. He and Dewar were unsuccessfully sued by Alfred Nobel over infringement of Nobel's patent for a similar explosive called ballistite, the case finally being resolved in the House of Lords in 1895. He also extensively researched the behaviour of black powder when ignited, with the Scottish physicist Sir Andrew Noble. At the request of the British government, he devised the Abel test, a means of determining the flash point of petroleum products. His first instrument, the open-test apparatus, was specified in an Act of Parliament in 1868 for officially specifying petroleum products. It was superseded in August 1879 by the much more reliable Abel close-test instrument. Under his leadership, first, guncotton was developed at Waltham Abbey Royal Gunpowder Mills, patented in 1865, then, the propellant cordite, patented in 1889. In electricity, Abel studied the construction of electrical fuses and other applications of electricity to warlike purposes.

== Leadership and honours ==
Abel was elected a Fellow of the Royal Society in 1860 and received their Royal Medal in 1887. He was president of the Chemical Society (1875–77), of the Institution of Electrical Engineers (then the Society of Telegraph Engineers) (1877), of the Institute of Chemistry (1881–82) and of the Society of Chemical Industry (1882–83). He was also president of the Iron and Steel Institute in 1891, and was awarded the Bessemer Gold Medal in 1897 for his work on problems of steel manufacture. He was awarded the Telford Medal by the Institution of Civil Engineers in 1879.

He was made a Commander of the Order of the Bath (CB) in 1877, and was knighted on 20 April 1883. He took an important part in the work of the International Inventions Exhibition (London) in 1885, and in 1887 became organizing secretary and first director of the Imperial Institute, a position he held till his death in 1902. He was Rede Lecturer and received an honorary doctorate from Cambridge University in 1888. He was upgraded Knight Commander of the Order of the Bath (KCB) on 3 February 1891, created a baronet, of Cadogan Place in the Parish of Chelsea in the County of London, on 25 May 1893 and made a Knight Grand Cross of the Royal Victorian Order (GCVO) on 8 March 1901.

== Death ==
Sir Frederick Abel died at his residence in Whitehall Court, London, on 6 September 1902, aged 75, and was buried in Nunhead Cemetery, London. The baronetcy became extinct on his death.

== Family ==
Abel married twice; first to Sarah Blanch, daughter of James Blanch, of Bristol; secondly after his first wife's death to Giulietta de La Feuillade. He left no children.

Abel baronets
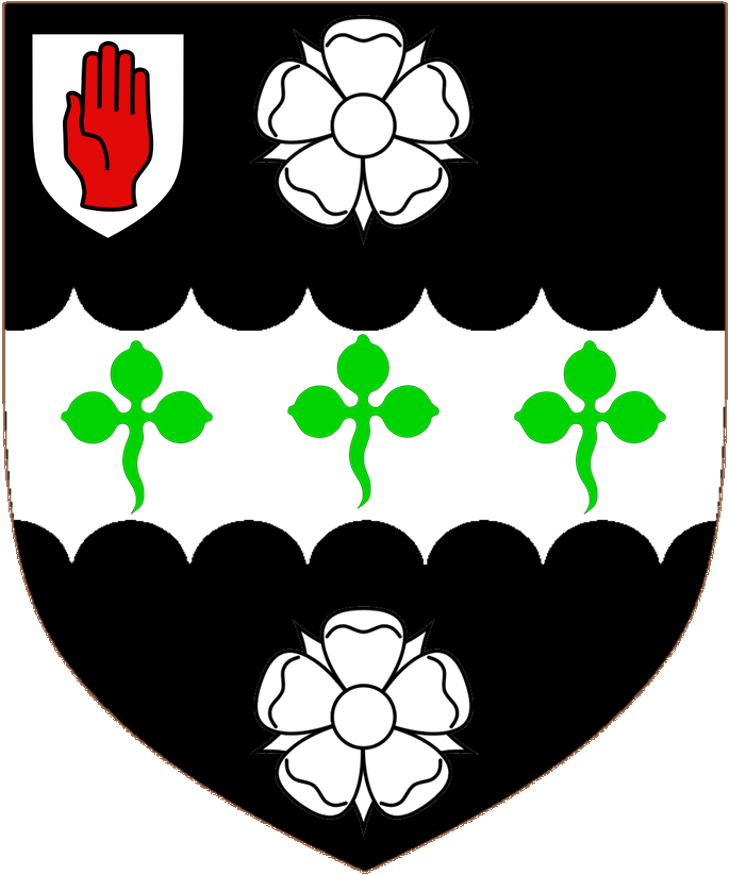
- Escutcheon of the Abel baronets
- Creation date: 1893
- Status: extinct
- Extinction date: 1902
- Motto: Ohne Rast Zum Ziel
- Arms: Sable on a Fess engrailed between two Roses palewise Argent three Trefoils slipped Vert
- Crest: In front of a Dexter Arm embowed in Armour the hand grasping a Thunderbolt a Torch fesswise fired all proper

== Books ==
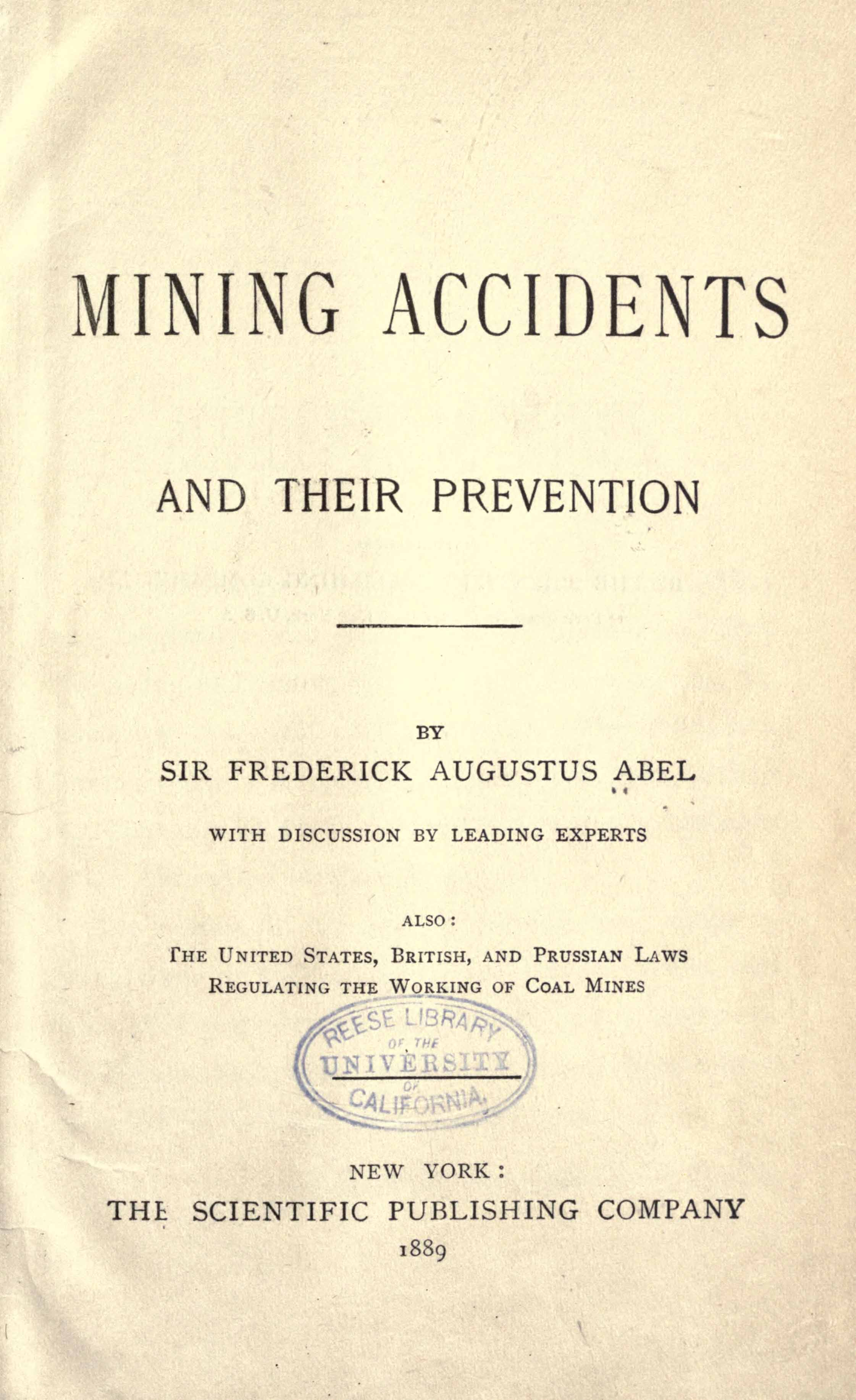
Mining accidents and their prevention, 1889

- Handbook of Chemistry (with C. L. Bloxam)
- The Modern History of Gunpowder (1866)
- Gun-cotton (1866)
- On Explosive Agents (1872)
- Researches in Explosives (1875)
- Mining accidents and their prevention. New York: Scientific publishing company. 1889.
- Electricity applied to Explosive Purposes (1898)

He also wrote several articles in the ninth edition of the Encyclopædia Britannica.

== See also ==
- Internal ballistics

Baronetage of the United Kingdom
New creation	Baronet (of Cadogan Place); 1893–1902	Extinct
Preceded by Schroder baronets	Abel baronets of Cadogan Place; 25 May 1893	Succeeded by Holden baronets
