= James Joicey, 1st Baron Joicey =

English coal magnate and politician (1846–1936)

The Right Honourable The Lord Joicey JP DL
- (Parliamentary Album 1895)
- Successor: James Arthur Joicey
- Known for: Coal mining magnate and politician
- Born: 4 April 1846; Tanfield, co. Durham
- Died: 21 November 1936 (aged 90); Ford Castle, Ford, Northumberland
- Buried: St Michael's Church, Ford
- Offices: MP (Chester-le-Street), JP, DL (co. Durham)

James Joicey, 1st Baron Joicey JP DL (4 April 1846 – 21 November 1936) was an English industrialist, politician, and aristocrat known primarily for being a coal mining magnate from Durham and a Liberal Party Member of Parliament (MP).

== Life ==
James Joicey was born on 4 April 1846 in Tanfield, co. Durham, the second son of George Joicey, partner in an engineering firm in Newcastle, and Dorothy Joicey née Gowland. The family was living in Kip Hill at the time of Joicey's baptism in June 1846. He attended the Anchorage School, Gateshead, and Gainford Academy, near Darlington. Joicey's father died when Joicey was ten years old.

Joicey married Amy Robinson in 1879. They had two sons. Widowed in 1881, Joicey married Marguerite Smyles Drever in 1884 and they had two sons and a daughter.

== Career ==
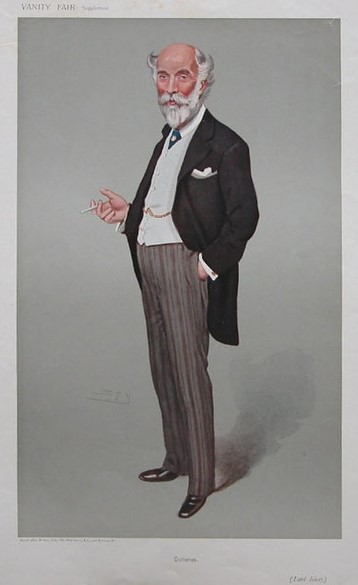
James Joicey (Vanity Fair, 1906)

Aged seventeen years old, Joicey began as a clerk at his uncle James' mining company James Joicey & Co., Ltd, (founded in 1838, incorporated in 1886) which operated several collieries in the West Durham coalfield including pits at Beamish and Tanfield. Joicey became managing director in 1872. He purchased Lord Durham's Lambton collieries in 1896 and the Hetton collieries in 1911. He was Chairman and Managing Director of both James Joicey & Co., Ltd, and the Lambton & Hetton Collieries, Ltd. From late 1924, steps were taken to merge both companies to form the Lambton, Hetton & Joicey Collieries. Popularly known on Tyneside as "Jimmy Joicey" and "Old King Coal", Joicey was reputed to have been the largest coal-owner in the world.

Baron Joicey worked in government held posts in England, working as Deputy Lieutenant for County Durham, and Justice of the Peace for Northumberland, Montgomeryshire and Newcastle Upon-Tyne. Joicey was elected as Member of Parliament for Chester-le-Street at the 1885 general election, and held the seat until the 1906 election. He was created a Baronet of Longhirst and of Ulgham, both in the County of Northumberland, on 3 July 1893 and then elevated to the peerage as Baron Joicey, of Chester-le-Street in the County of Durham, on 13 January 1906.

From 1887 his seat was Longhirst Hall near Morpeth, Northumberland. In 1906 he bought the Ford Castle estate, Ford, Northumberland, and in 1908 the Etal Castle estate in Northumberland.

== Death ==
Joicey died at his home, Ford Castle, on 21 November 1936, aged 90, and was buried at St Michael's Church, Ford. He was succeeded by his son James Arthur.

Coat of arms of James Joicey, 1st Baron Joicey
Crest A demi-man affrontée in armour Proper, garnished Or, the helmet adorned with three feathers Gules, holding in the dexter hand a scimitar of the first, pommel and hilt Gold, supporting with the sinister hand an escutcheon Argent, charged with three torteaux within two bendlets invected of the second between two fleurs-de-lis Sable. Escutcheon Argent three lozenges Sable within two bendlets invected Gules between two miners' picks in bend Proper. Supporters On either side a Shetland pony Proper, haltered Or. Motto Omne Solum Forti Patria

Parliament of the United Kingdom
New constituency	Member of Parliament for Chester-le-Street; 1885–1906	Succeeded by John Taylor
Peerage of the United Kingdom
New creation	Baron Joicey; 1906–1936	Succeeded by James Arthur Joicey
Baronetage of the United Kingdom
New creation	Baronet (of Chester-le-Street); 1893–1936	Succeeded by James Arthur Joicey
