= Ford Castle =

Listed building in England

- Northumberland, England, UK
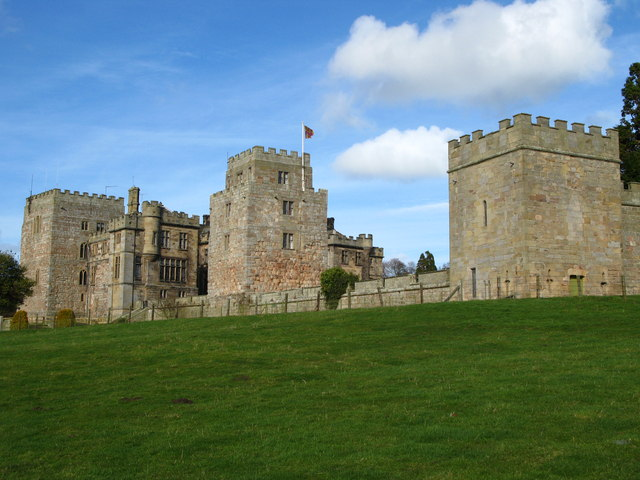

Location
- Location in Northumberland
- Coordinates: 55.631°N 2.091°W
- Grid reference: NT944375

Airfield information
- Identifiers

Ford Castle is a Grade I listed building situated at a shallow crossing point on the River Till, Ford, Northumberland, England.

== History ==
The castle dates from about 1278. The owner Sir William Heron was granted a licence to crenellate the castle in 1338. It was captured by the Scots in 1385 and dismantled by them. However, by the beginning of the 16th century, it had been rebuilt and refortified. It was taken by James IV of Scotland on the eve of the Battle of Flodden in 1513. The castle passed from the Heron family to the Carr family by marriage in 1549, by the marriage of Elizabeth Heron to Thomas Carr of Etal. In that year, during the war with Scotland known as the Rough Wooing, a French soldier André de Montalembert besieged the castle.

The Heron family disputed Carr's ownership and seized the castle for time in March 1557. In August 1557, the castle was attacked by Lord James and Robert Stewart (sons of James V) and Lord Home who brought artillery and burnt farmhouses in the "ten towns of Glendale".

The castle and lands passed by marriage passed to Sir Francis Blake of Cogges, Oxfordshire in the 1660s. Blake built a substantial mansion in Tudor style within the castle in 1694. On Blake's death in 1717 the Ford estate passed to the husband of his late daughter Mary and then in 1723 to her son Francis Blake Delaval (1692–1752). In 1761 John Delaval, 1st Baron Delaval (1728–1808) rebuilt the Hall with the assistance of architect George Raffield in a Gothic style.

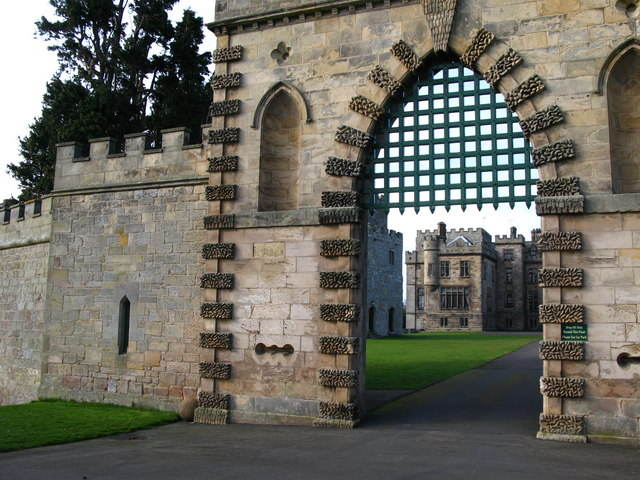
Ford Castle gate

On his death, the property passed to his granddaughter Susannah who had married the Marquess of Waterford. From 1861-1865, Louisa, Dowager Marchioness of Waterford (d 1891), widow of the 3rd Marquess, restored and substantially remodelled the Hall to make it 'more baronial'.

The castle was acquired in 1907 by the coal-mining magnate James Joicey, 1st Baron Joicey, and it stayed with his family, in 1956 it was leased to Northumberland County Council as a Young Persons' Residential Centre.

In 2022, Ford Castle was acquired by PGL, which now operates the site as an outdoor activity centre offering residential trips for schools, groups, and young people.

As of 2025 during the out-of-season period (November to March 31), the site offers a range of activities and events, with some shops and cafés operating on special seasonal hours.

== Sources ==
- Allsopp, Bruce; Clark, Ursula (1969). Historic Architecture of Northumberland. Newcastle upon Tyne: Oriel Press. ISBN 0 85362 062 8.
