= Etal, Northumberland =

Village in Northumberland, England

Coordinates: 55.648°N 2.120°W

Etal
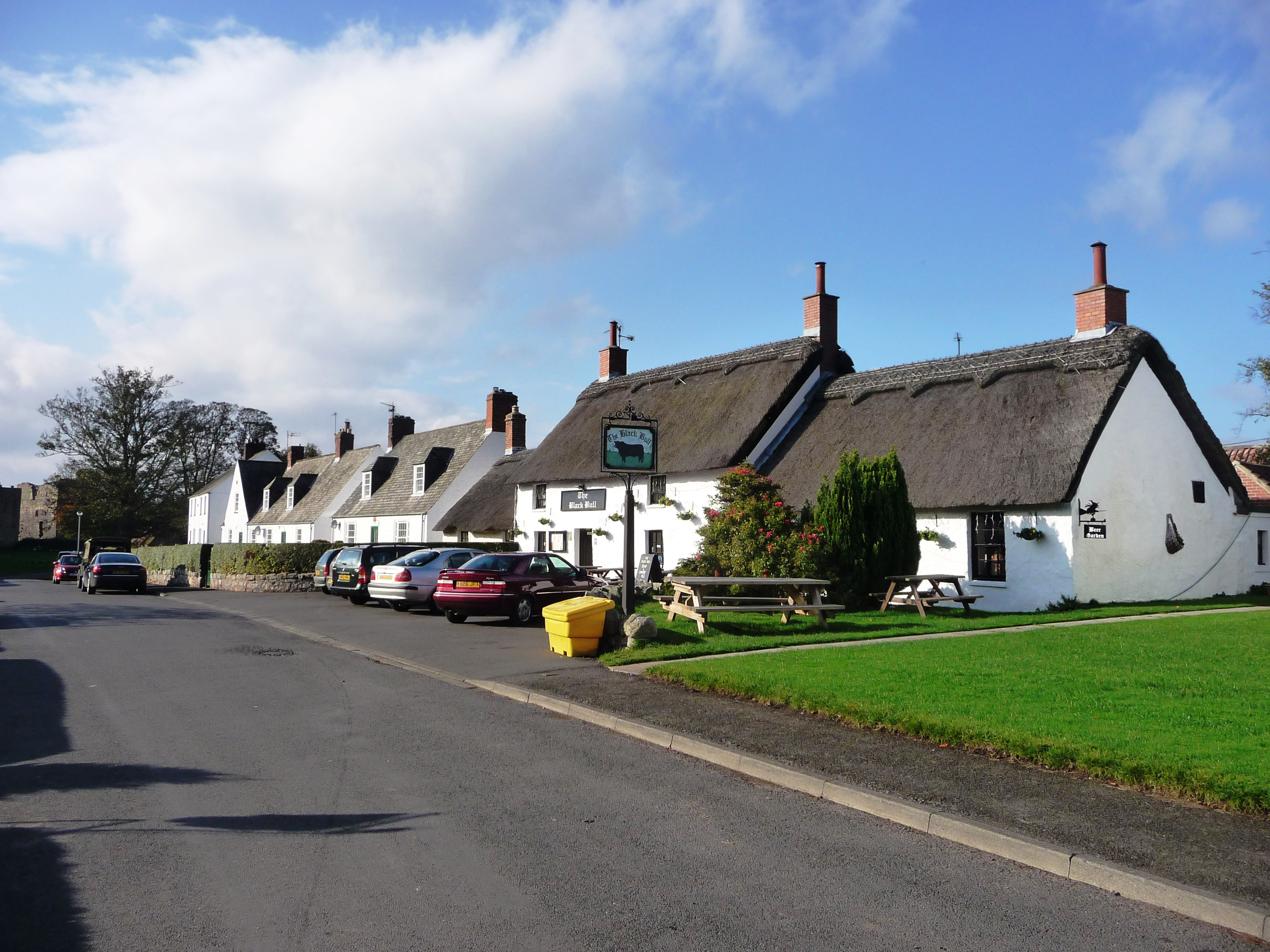

- Location within Northumberland
- Population: ~50
- OS grid reference: NT925395
- Unitary authority: Northumberland
- Ceremonial county: Northumberland
- Region: North East
- Country: England
- Sovereign state: United Kingdom
- Post town: CORNHILL-ON-TWEED
- Postcode district: TD12
- Dialling code: 01890
- Police: Northumbria
- Fire: Northumberland
- Ambulance: North East
- UK Parliament: North Northumberland

Etal (/ˈiːtəl/ EE-təl) is a small village in the far north of the county of Northumberland, England, in the civil parish of Ford. It lies on a bridging point of the River Till ten miles south west of Berwick-upon-Tweed, and includes the substantial ruins of the medieval Etal Castle, now owned by English Heritage. It has just one residential street, and has a population of fewer than fifty.

== Buildings ==
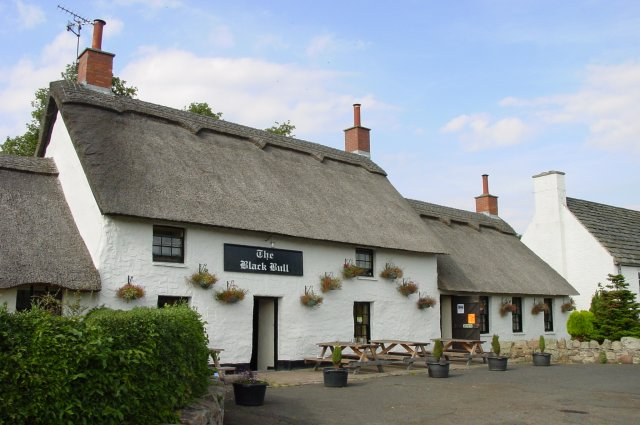
The Black Bull pub

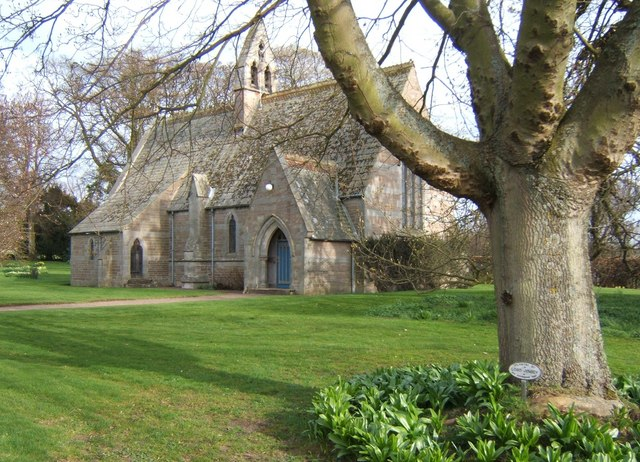
Etal Chapel

The village is centred on a now ruined castle, which over the years has seen much conflict between England and Scotland. The large majority of the buildings in the village are traditional and are owned by Ford & Etal Estates. Also there is Northumberland's only thatched pub (The Black Bull) and next door is the village hall. Behind the Lavender Tearooms and a few more 'picture postcard' houses is an expansive walled garden. Used extensively by the late Lady Joicey for the training of dressage horses, it is now used intermittently for Icelandic Horse events and features a grass oval track. Near the castle is the northern terminus of the Heatherslaw Light Railway
