= River Till, Northumberland =

River in Northumberland, England

River Till
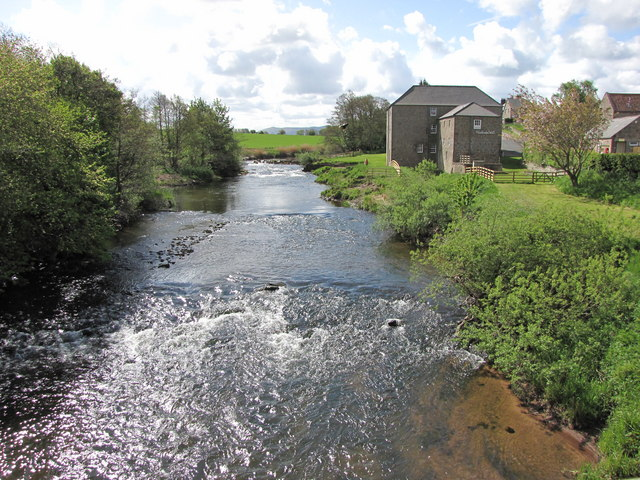
- River Till near Heatherslaw, Etal

- Location of the mouth within Northumberland

Location
- Country: United Kingdom
- County: Northumberland

Physical characteristics
- Mouth
  - coordinates: 55.6802°N 2.2082°W

The River Till is a river of north-eastern Northumberland. It is a tributary of the River Tweed, of which it is the only major tributary to flow wholly in England. Upstream of the locality of Bewick Bridge, 8.5 km to the southeast of Wooler the river is known as the River Breamish. It rises on Comb Fell in the Cheviot Hills.

Its tributaries include Wooler Water, which originates in the Cheviots, and the River Glen in Glendale. It meets the Tweed a mile to the west of Twizell Bridge, 4 km downstream of Coldstream. According to local folklore:

Tweed said to Till
"What gars ye rin sae stil?"
Says Till to Tweed,
"Though ye rin wi' speed
And I rin slaw
Whar ye droon yin man
I droon twa"

Recent environmental projects have included an attempt to conserve the native brown trout.

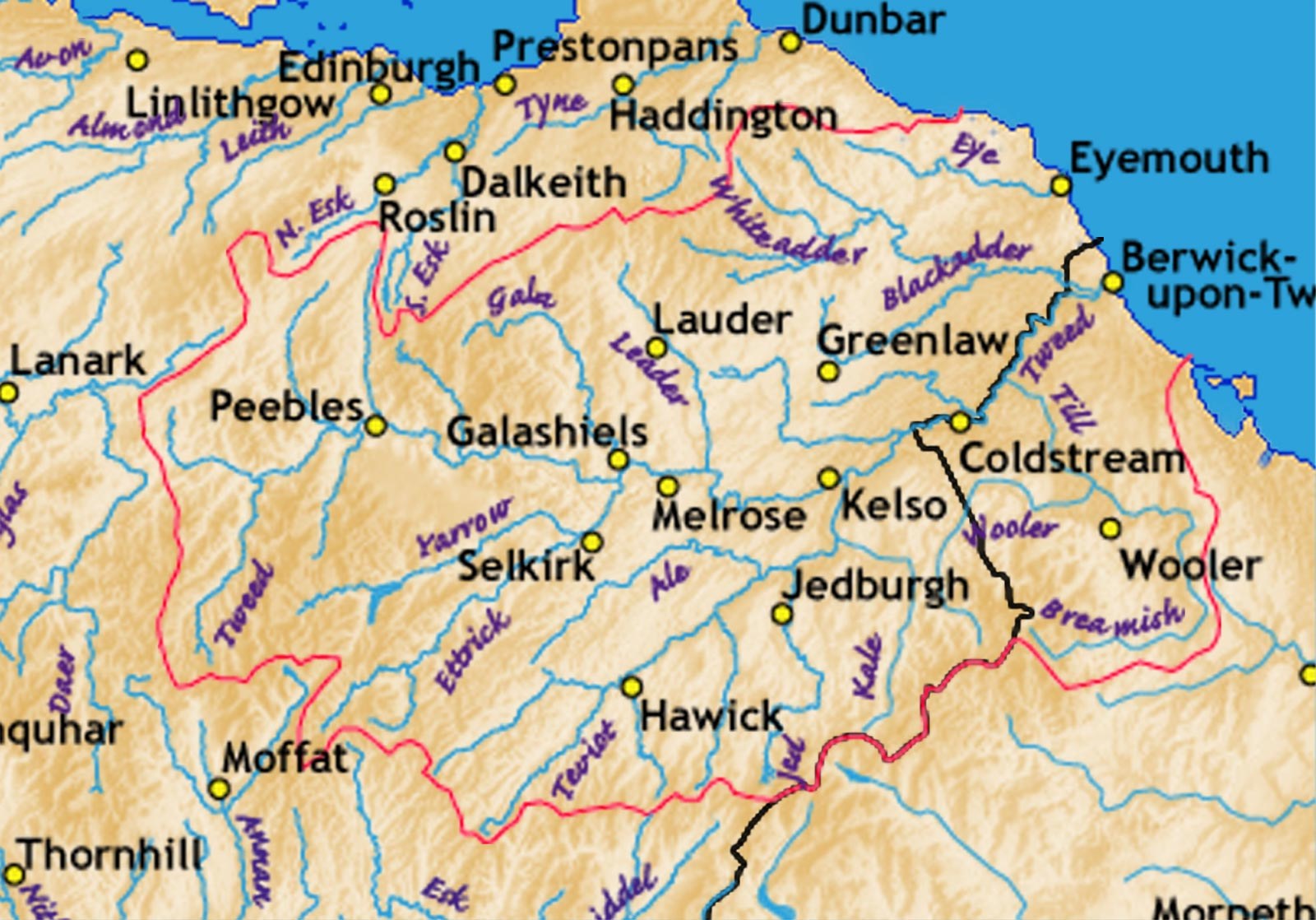
Tweed tributaries
