= List of acts of the Parliament of the United Kingdom from 1926 =

This is a complete list of acts of the Parliament of the United Kingdom for the year 1926.

Note that the first parliament of the United Kingdom was held in 1801; parliaments between 1707 and 1800 were either parliaments of Great Britain or of Ireland). For acts passed up until 1707, see the list of acts of the Parliament of England and the list of acts of the Parliament of Scotland. For acts passed from 1707 to 1800, see the list of acts of the Parliament of Great Britain. See also the list of acts of the Parliament of Ireland.

For acts of the devolved parliaments and assemblies in the United Kingdom, see the list of acts of the Scottish Parliament, the list of acts of the Northern Ireland Assembly, and the list of acts and measures of Senedd Cymru; see also the list of acts of the Parliament of Northern Ireland.

The number shown after each act's title is its chapter number. Acts passed before 1963 are cited using this number, preceded by the year(s) of the reign during which the relevant parliamentary session was held; thus the Union with Ireland Act 1800 is cited as "39 & 40 Geo. 3 c. 67", meaning the 67th act passed during the session that started in the 39th year of the reign of George III and which finished in the 40th year of that reign. Note that the modern convention is to use Arabic numerals in citations (thus "41 Geo. 3" rather than "41 Geo. III"). Acts of the last session of the Parliament of Great Britain and the first session of the Parliament of the United Kingdom are both cited as "41 Geo. 3". Acts passed from 1963 onwards are simply cited by calendar year and chapter number.

== 16 & 17 Geo. 5 ==
The second session of the 34th Parliament of the United Kingdom, which met from 2 February 1926 until 15 December 1926.

No private acts were passed during this session.

This session was traditionally cited as 16 & 17 G. 5.

=== Public general acts ===
Short title	Citation	Royal assent
Long title
Consolidated Fund (No. 1) Act 1926 (repealed)	16 & 17 Geo. 5. c. 1	26 March 1926
An Act to apply certain sums out of the Consolidated Fund to the service of the years ending on the thirty-first day of March, one thousand nine hundred and twenty-five, one thousand nine hundred and twenty-six, and one thousand nine hundred and twenty-seven. (Repealed by Statute Law Revision Act 1950 (14 Geo. 6. c. 6))
Public Works Loans Act 1926 (repealed)	16 & 17 Geo. 5. c. 2	26 March 1926
An Act to grant money for the purpose of certain local loans out of the Local Loans Fund. (Repealed by Statute Law Revision Act 1950 (14 Geo. 6. c. 6))
Trade Facilities Act 1926 (repealed)	16 & 17 Geo. 5. c. 3	26 March 1926
An Act to amend the Trade Facilities Acts, 1921 to 1925, by increasing the maximum limit of the loans in respect of which guarantees may be given under those Acts and by extending the period within which such guarantees may be given, and to extend the periods during which guarantees may respectively be given and remain in force under the Overseas Trade Acts, 1920 to 1924. (Repealed by Statute Law (Repeals) Act 1974 (c. 22))
Unemployment Insurance (Northern Ireland Agreement) Act 1926 (repealed)	16 & 17 Geo. 5. c. 4	26 March 1926
An Act to confirm and give effect to an agreement made between the Treasury and the Ministry of Finance for Northern Ireland with a view to assimilating the burdens on the Exchequers of the United Kingdom and Northern Ireland with respect to unemployment insurance. (Repealed by Unemployment (Northern Ireland Agreement) Act 1936 (26 Geo. 5 & 1 Edw. 8. c. 10))
Allotments (Scotland) Act 1926 (repealed)	16 & 17 Geo. 5. c. 5	29 April 1926
An Act to amend section sixteen of the Allotments (Scotland) Act, 1922. (Note: Allotments (Scotland) Act 1922 (12 & 13 Geo. 5. c. 52)) (Repealed by Local Government (Scotland) Act 1947 (10 & 11 Geo. 6. c. 43))
Army and Air Force (Annual) Act 1926 (repealed)	16 & 17 Geo. 5. c. 6	29 April 1926
An Act to provide, during Twelve Months, for the Discipline and Regulation of the Army and Air Force. (Repealed by Statute Law Revision Act 1950 (14 Geo. 6. c. 6), Statute Law Revision Act 1953 (2 & 3 Eliz. 2. c. 5) and Revision of the Army and Air Force Acts (Transitional Provisions) Act 1955 (3 & 4 Eliz. 2. c. 20))
Bankruptcy (Amendment) Act 1926 (repealed)	16 & 17 Geo. 5. c. 7	16 June 1926
An Act to amend the Bankruptcy Act, 1914. (Note: Bankruptcy Act 1914 (4 & 5 Geo. 5. c. 59)) (Repealed by Insolvency Act 1985 (c. 65))
Weights and Measures (Amendment) Act 1926 (repealed)	16 & 17 Geo. 5. c. 8	16 June 1926
An Act to amend the law with respect to measuring instruments, and with respect to the power to charge fees in connection with the testing of weighing and measuring apparatus. (Repealed by Weights and Measures Act 1963 (c. 31))
Economy (Miscellaneous Provisions) Act 1926 or the Representation of the People (Economy Provisions) Act 1926 (repealed)	16 & 17 Geo. 5. c. 9	16 June 1926
An Act to make provision for reducing in respect of certain services the charges on public funds and for increasing, by means of the payment into the Exchequer of certain sums and otherwise, the funds available for meeting such charges, and to amend accordingly the law relating to national health insurance, unemployment insurance, the registration of electors and the holding of elections, education, bankruptcy and companies winding-up fees and certain other fees, and postmarks, and for purposes related or incidental to the matters aforesaid. (Repealed by Unemployment Insurance Act 1929 (20 & 21 Geo. 5. c. 3), British Shipping (Assistance) Act 1935 (25 & 26 Geo. 5. c. 7), National Health Insurance Act 1936 (26 Geo. 5 & 1 Edw. 8. c. 32), Education Act 1944 (7 & 8 Geo. 6. c. 31), Representation of the People Act 1948 (11 & 12 Geo. 6. c. 65), Statute Law Revision Act 1950 (14 Geo. 6. c. 6), Post Office Act 1953 (1 & 2 Eliz. 2. c. 36), Companies Act 1967 (c. 81) and Insolvency Services (Accounting and Investment) Act 1970 (c. 8))
Local Authorities (Emergency Provisions) Act 1926 (repealed)	16 & 17 Geo. 5. c. 10	16 June 1926
An Act to extend further the duration of the Local Authorities (Emergency Provisions) Act, 1923. (Note: Local Authorities (Emergency Provisions) Act 1923 (13 & 14 Geo. 5. c. 6)) (Repealed by Local Government Act 1933 (23 & 24 Geo. 5. c. 51) and Statute Law Revision Act 1950 (14 Geo. 6. c. 6))
Law of Property (Amendment) Act 1926	16 & 17 Geo. 5. c. 11	16 June 1926
An Act to amend certain enactments relating to the Law of Property and Trustees.
Unemployment Insurance Act 1926 (repealed)	16 & 17 Geo. 5. c. 12	30 June 1926
An Act to extend the periods of operation of section one and subsection (2) of section three of the Unemployment Insurance (No. 2) Act, 1924, (Note: Unemployment Insurance (No. 2) Act 1924 (14 & 15 Geo. 5. c. 30)) and of subsection (1) of section five of the Unemployment Insurance Act, 1925. (Note: Unemployment Insurance Act 1925 (15 & 16 Geo. 5. c. 69)) (Repealed by Statute Law Revision Act 1950 (14 Geo. 6. c. 6))
Criminal Justice (Amendment) Act 1926 (repealed)	16 & 17 Geo. 5. c. 13	30 June 1926
An Act to amend section seven of the Criminal Justice Act, 1925. (Note: Criminal Justice Act 1925 (15 & 16 Geo. 5. c. 86)) (Repealed by Criminal Justice Act 1948 (11 & 12 Geo. 6. c. 58))
Imperial War Graves Endowment Fund Act 1926	16 & 17 Geo. 5. c. 14	30 June 1926
An Act to provide for the incorporation of the Trustees of the Imperial War Graves Endowment Fund and for other matters connected with the said Fund.
Criminal Appeal (Scotland) Act 1926	16 & 17 Geo. 5. c. 15	8 July 1926
An Act to amend the law of Scotland relating to appeal in criminal cases tried on indictment.
Execution of Diligence (Scotland) Act 1926	16 & 17 Geo. 5. c. 16	8 July 1926
An Act to amend the law relating to the execution of diligence in Scotland.
Coal Mines Act 1926 (repealed)	16 & 17 Geo. 5. c. 17	8 July 1926
An Act to amend temporarily the Coal Mines Acts, 1887 to 1919, with respect to the hours of employment below ground. (Repealed by Statute Law Revision Act 1950 (14 Geo. 6. c. 6))
Secretaries of State Act 1926	16 & 17 Geo. 5. c. 18	15 July 1926
An Act to transfer the powers of the Secretary for Scotland to one of His Majesty's Principal Secretaries of State, and to increase the number of Secretaries of State and Under Secretaries of State capable of sitting and voting in the Commons House of Parliament, and for purposes connected with the matters aforesaid.
Re-election of Ministers Act (1919) Amendment Act 1926 (repealed)	16 & 17 Geo. 5. c. 19	15 July 1926
An Act to remove the necessity of the re-election of Members of the House of Commons on acceptance of office. (Repealed by Statute Law Revision Act 1950 (14 Geo. 6. c. 6))
Board of Guardians (Default) Act 1926 (repealed)	16 & 17 Geo. 5. c. 20	15 July 1926
An Act to provide in the case of default by a board of guardians for the reconstitution of the board; and for matters arising out of the default or consequential on the reconstitution. (Repealed by Poor Law Act 1927 (17 & 18 Geo. 5. c. 14))
Markets and Fairs (Weighing of Cattle) Act 1926	16 & 17 Geo. 5. c. 21	15 July 1926
An Act to amend the Markets and Fairs (Weighing of Cattle) Acts, 1887 (Note: Markets and Fairs (Weighing of Cattle) Act 1887 (50 & 51 Vict. c. 27)) and 1891. (Note: Markets and Fairs (Weighing of Cattle) Act 1891 (54 & 55 Vict. c. 70))
Finance Act 1926 (repealed)	16 & 17 Geo. 5. c. 22	4 August 1926
An Act to grant certain duties of Customs and Inland Revenue (including Excise), to alter other duties, and to amend the law relating to Customs and Inland Revenue (including Excise) and the National Debt, and to make further provision in connection with finance. (Repealed by Statute Law (Repeals) Act 1993 (c. 50))
Appropriation Act 1926 (repealed)	16 & 17 Geo. 5. c. 23	4 August 1926
An Act to apply a sum out of the Consolidated Fund to the service of the year ending on the thirty-first day of March, one thousand nine hundred and twenty-seven, and to appropriate the Supplies granted in this Session of Parliament. (Repealed by Statute Law Revision Act 1950 (14 Geo. 6. c. 6))
Land Drainage Act 1926 (repealed)	16 & 17 Geo. 5. c. 24	4 August 1926
An Act to amend the law with respect to the drainage of agricultural land. (Repealed by Land Drainage Act 1930 (20 & 21 Geo. 5. c. 44))
Petroleum Act 1926 (repealed)	16 & 17 Geo. 5. c. 25	4 August 1926
An Act to amend the Petroleum Acts, 1871 (Note: Petroleum Act 1871 (34 & 35 Vict. c. 105)) and 1879. (Note: Petroleum Act 1879 (42 & 43 Vict. c. 47)) (Repealed by Petroleum (Consolidation) Act 1928 (18 & 19 Geo. 5. c. 32))
Chartered Associations (Protection of Names and Uniforms) Act 1926	16 & 17 Geo. 5. c. 26	4 August 1926
An Act to protect the names, uniforms, and badges of associations incorporated by Royal Charter.
Isle of Man (Customs) Act 1926 (repealed)	16 & 17 Geo. 5. c. 27	4 August 1926
An Act to amend the law with respect to Customs in the Isle of Man. (Repealed for the Isle of Man by the Customs and Excise etc. Order 1976 (GC No 1/76))
Mining Industry Act 1926	16 & 17 Geo. 5. c. 28	4 August 1926
An Act to make provision for facilitating the working of minerals and the better organisation of the coal mining industry, and with respect to the welfare of persons employed therein, and for other purposes connected with that industry.
Adoption of Children Act 1926 (repealed)	16 & 17 Geo. 5. c. 29	4 August 1926
An Act to make provision for the adoption of infants. (Repealed by Finance Act 1949 (12, 13 & 14 Geo. 6. c. 47), Adoption Act 1950 (14 Geo. 6. c. 26), Children Act 1958 (6 & 7 Eliz. 2. c. 65), Adoption Act 1964 (c. 57) and Children Act 1975 (c. 72))
Heather Burning (Scotland) Act 1926 (repealed)	16 & 17 Geo. 5. c. 30	4 August 1926
An Act to facilitate the burning of heather in Scotland and to extend the period in which this can be done. (Repealed by Hill Farming Act 1946 (9 & 10 Geo. 6. c. 73))
Home Counties (Music and Dancing) Licensing Act 1926 (repealed)	16 & 17 Geo. 5. c. 31	4 August 1926
An Act to amend the law as regards music and dancing licences in parts of certain Home Counties and in certain county boroughs adjacent thereto. (Repealed by Local Government (Miscellaneous Provisions) Act 1982 (c. 30))
Midwives and Maternity Homes Act 1926 (repealed)	16 & 17 Geo. 5. c. 32	4 August 1926
An Act to amend the Midwives Acts, 1902 (Note: Midwives Act 1902 (2 Edw. 7. c. 17)) and 1918, (Note: Midwives Act 1918 (8 & 9 Geo. 5. c. 43)) and to provide for the registration and inspection of maternity homes, and for purposes connected therewith. (Repealed by Midwives Act 1951 (14 & 15 Geo. 6. c. 53))
Appropriation (No. 2) Act 1926 (repealed)	16 & 17 Geo. 5. c. 33	22 November 1926
An Act to apply a sum out of the Consolidated Fund to the service of the year ending on the thirty-first day of March, one thousand nine hundred and twenty-seven, and to appropriate the further Supplies granted in this Session of Parliament. (Repealed by Statute Law Revision Act 1950 (14 Geo. 6. c. 6))
Police Pensions Act 1926 (repealed)	16 & 17 Geo. 5. c. 34	22 November 1926
An Act to increase the rateable deductions to be made from the pay of the police and to authorise, in certain circumstances, the return of rateable deductions in the case of members of police forces retired or dismissed after the thirtieth day of June, nineteen hundred and nineteen. (Repealed by Police Pensions Act 1948 (11 & 12 Geo. 6. c. 24))
Industrial Assurance (Juvenile Societies) Act 1926	16 & 17 Geo. 5. c. 35	15 December 1926
An Act to amend section eleven of the Industrial Assurance Act, 1923, (Note: Industrial Assurance Act 1923 (13 & 14 Geo. 5. c. 8)) with respect to the exemption from that Act of juvenile societies.
Parks Regulation (Amendment) Act 1926	16 & 17 Geo. 5. c. 36	15 December 1926
An Act to amend the Parks Regulation Act, 1872. (Note: Parks Regulation Act 1872 (35 & 36 Vict. c. 15))
Lead Paint (Protection against Poisoning) Act 1926 (repealed)	16 & 17 Geo. 5. c. 37	15 December 1926
An Act to make better provision for the protection against lead poisoning of persons employed in painting buildings. (Repealed by Factories Act 1961 (9 & 10 Eliz. 2. c. 34))
Local Government (County Boroughs and Adjustments) Act 1926 (repealed)	16 & 17 Geo. 5. c. 38	15 December 1926
An Act to amend the law with respect to the constitution and extension of county boroughs, and to amend the Local Government (Adjustments) Act, 1913. (Note: Local Government (Adjustments) Act 1913 (3 & 4 Geo. 5. c. 19)) (Repealed by Statute Law (Repeals) Act 1975 (c. 10))
Horticultural Produce (Sales on Commission) Act 1926	16 & 17 Geo. 5. c. 39	15 December 1926
An Act to regulate the sale on commission of horticultural produce.
Indian and Colonial Divorce Jurisdiction Act 1926 (repealed)	16 & 17 Geo. 5. c. 40	15 December 1926
An Act to confer on Courts in India and other parts of His Majesty's Dominions jurisdiction in certain cases with respect to the dissolution of marriages, the parties whereto are domiciled in England or Scotland, and to validate certain decrees granted for the dissolution of the marriage of persons so domiciled. (Repealed by Family Law Act 1986 (c. 55))
Naval Reserve (Officers) Act 1926 (repealed)	16 & 17 Geo. 5. c. 41	15 December 1926
An Act to amend the Officers of Royal Naval Reserve Act, 1863. (Note: Officers of Royal Naval Reserve Act 1863 (26 & 27 Vict. c. 69)) (Repealed by Reserve Forces Act 1980 (c. 9))
Workmen's Compensation Act 1926 (repealed)	16 & 17 Geo. 5. c. 42	15 December 1926
An Act to amend subsection (2) of section eleven of the Workmen's Compensation Act, 1925. (Note: Workmen's Compensation Act 1925 (15 & 16 Geo. 5. c. 84)) (Repealed by National Insurance (Industrial Injuries) Act 1946 (9 & 10 Geo. 6. c. 62))
Public Health (Smoke Abatement) Act 1926 (repealed)	16 & 17 Geo. 5. c. 43	15 December 1926
An Act to amend the law relating to smoke nuisances and for other purposes connected therewith. (Repealed by Clean Air Enactments (Repeals and Modifications) Regulations 1974 (SI 1974/2170))
Supreme Court of Judicature of Northern Ireland Act 1926 (repealed)	16 & 17 Geo. 5. c. 44	15 December 1926
An Act to amend the law with respect to the salaries and pensions of persons hereafter appointed to be judges of the Supreme Court of Judicature of Northern Ireland, and with respect to certain matters connected with that Court. (Repealed by Judicature (Northern Ireland) Act 1978 (c. 23))
Fertilisers and Feeding Stuffs Act 1926 (repealed)	16 & 17 Geo. 5. c. 45	15 December 1926
An Act to amend the law with respect to the sale of fertilisers and feeding stuffs. (Repealed by Agriculture Act 1970 (c. 40))
University of London Act 1926 (repealed)	16 & 17 Geo. 5. c. 46	15 December 1926
An Act to make further provision with respect to the University of London. (Repealed by University of London Act 1978 (c. ii))
Rating (Scotland) Act 1926	16 & 17 Geo. 5. c. 47	15 December 1926
An Act to amend the law with respect to rating in Scotland, and for purposes incidental thereto or connected therewith.
Births and Deaths Registration Act 1926	16 & 17 Geo. 5. c. 48	15 December 1926
An Act to amend the law relating to certification of deaths and the disposal of the dead.
Expiring Laws Continuance Act 1926 (repealed)	16 & 17 Geo. 5. c. 49	15 December 1926
An Act to continue certain Expiring Laws. (Repealed by Statute Law Revision Act 1950 (14 Geo. 6. c. 6))
Burgh Registers (Scotland) Act 1926 (repealed)	16 & 17 Geo. 5. c. 50	15 December 1926
An Act to provide for the discontinuance of the Burgh Registers of Sasines in Scotland. (Repealed by Statute Law (Repeals) Act 1974 (c. 22) and Land Registration etc. (Scotland) Act 2012 (asp 5))
Electricity (Supply) Act 1926 (repealed)	16 & 17 Geo. 5. c. 51	15 December 1926
An Act to amend the law with respect to the supply of electricity. (Repealed by Electricity Act 1989 (c. 29))
Small Holdings and Allotments Act 1926	16 & 17 Geo. 5. c. 52	15 December 1926
An Act to amend the Small Holdings and Allotments Acts, 1908 to 1919.
Merchandise Marks Act 1926 (repealed)	16 & 17 Geo. 5. c. 53	15 December 1926
An Act to require an indication of origin to be given in the case of certain imported goods. (Repealed for the United Kingdom by Trade Descriptions Act 1968 (c. 29) and for the Isle of Man by Statute Law (Repeals) Act 1993 (c. 50))
Wireless Telegraphy (Blind Persons Facilities) Act 1926 (repealed)	16 & 17 Geo. 5. c. 54	15 December 1926
An Act to facilitate the use of wireless telegraphy by the blind. (Repealed by Statute Law (Repeals) Act 1973 (c. 39))
Roman Catholic Relief Act 1926 (repealed)	16 & 17 Geo. 5. c. 55	15 December 1926
An Act to provide for the further relief of His Majesty's Roman Catholic subjects. (Repealed by Statute Law (Repeals) Act 1989 (c. 43))
Housing (Rural Workers) Act 1926 (repealed)	16 & 17 Geo. 5. c. 56	15 December 1926
An Act to promote the provision of housing accommodation for agricultural workers and for persons whose economic condition is substantially the same as that of such workers and the improvement of such accommodation, by authorising the giving of financial assistance towards the reconstruction and improvement of houses and other buildings. (Repealed for England and Wales by Housing Finance Act 1972 (c. 47) and for Scotland by Housing (Financial Provisions) (Scotland) Act 1972 (c. 46))
Prisons (Scotland) Act 1926 (repealed)	16 & 17 Geo. 5. c. 57	15 December 1926
An Act to amend the provisions of the Prisons (Scotland) Act, 1877, (Note: Prisons (Scotland) Act 1877 (40 & 41 Vict. c. 53)) relating to the discontinuance of prisons, and the legalisation of police cells as places of detention. (Repealed by Prisons (Scotland) Act 1952 (15 & 16 Geo. 6 & 1 Eliz. 2. c. 61))
Penal Servitude Act 1926 (repealed)	16 & 17 Geo. 5. c. 58	15 December 1926
An Act to increase and extend the powers of the court to inflict penal servitude in lieu of imprisonment in the case of certain crimes. (Repealed for England and Wales by Criminal Justice Act 1948 (11 & 12 Geo. 6. c. 58) and for Scotland by Criminal Justice (Scotland) Act 1949 (12, 13 & 14 Geo. 6. c. 94))
Coroners (Amendment) Act 1926 (repealed)	16 & 17 Geo. 5. c. 59	15 December 1926
An Act to amend the law relating to coroners. (Repealed by Coroners Act 1988 (c. 13))
Legitimacy Act 1926 (repealed)	16 & 17 Geo. 5. c. 60	15 December 1926
An Act to amend the law relating to children born out of wedlock. (Repealed by Legitimacy Act 1976 (c. 31))
Judicial Proceedings (Regulation of Reports) Act 1926	16 & 17 Geo. 5. c. 61	15 December 1926
An Act to regulate the publication of reports of judicial proceedings in such manner as to prevent injury to public morals.
Palestine and East Africa Loans Act 1926 or the East Africa Loans Act 1926 (repealed)	16 & 17 Geo. 5. c. 62	15 December 1926
An Act to authorise the Treasury to guarantee certain loans to be raised respectively by the Government of Palestine and by the Governments of certain territories in East Africa. (Repealed by Statute Law (Repeals) Act 1976 (c. 16))
Sale of Food (Weights and Measures) Act 1926 (repealed)	16 & 17 Geo. 5. c. 63	15 December 1926
An Act to provide for the better protection of the public in relation to the sale of food, including agricultural and horticultural produce. (Repealed by Weights and Measures Act 1963 (c. 31))

=== Local acts ===
Short title	Citation	Royal assent
Long title
Montrose Bridge Order Confirmation Act 1926	16 & 17 Geo. 5. c. i	26 March 1926
An Act to confirm a Provisional Order under the Private Legislation Procedure (Scotland) Act 1899 (Note: Private Legislation Procedure (Scotland) Act 1899 (62 & 63 Vict. c. 47)) relating to Montrose Bridge.
	Montrose Bridge Order 1926	
Dunfermline and District Tramways (Extensions) Order Confirmation Act 1926	16 & 17 Geo. 5. c. ii	29 April 1926
An Act to confirm a Provisional Order under the Private Legislation Procedure (Scotland) Act 1899 relating to Dunfermline and District Tramways.
	Dunfermline and District Tramways (Extensions) Order 1926	
Chosen Syndicate Limited Act 1926	16 & 17 Geo. 5. c. iii	29 April 1926
An Act for enabling the Chosen Syndicate Limited to reorganise and increase its capital and to provide for the cancellation of its "B" shares and to issue fully paid shares in exchange for the same and for other purposes.
Birmingham Canal Navigations Act 1926	16 & 17 Geo. 5. c. iv	16 June 1926
An Act to authorise the company of proprietors of the Birmingham Canal Navigations to close their wharf known as Old Wharf in the city of Birmingham and to sell the same and the site thereof and for other purposes.
Bristol Waterworks Act 1926	16 & 17 Geo. 5. c. v	16 June 1926
An Act to confirm the construction of certain works by the Bristol Waterworks Company to provide for the consolidation and conversion of the capital and loan capital of the Company and for other purposes.
Bristol Cemetery Act 1926	16 & 17 Geo. 5. c. vi	16 June 1926
An Act to confer further powers upon the Bristol General Cemetery Company and for other purposes.
City of London (Various Powers) Act 1926	16 & 17 Geo. 5. c. vii	16 June 1926
An Act to confer further powers upon the corporation of London in regard to sanitary matters and for other purposes.
Birkenhead Corporation Act 1926 (repealed)	16 & 17 Geo. 5. c. viii	16 June 1926
An Act to confer further powers upon the mayor aldermen and burgesses of the county borough of Birkenhead to run motor omnibuses to make further provision with reference to the finance of the borough and for other purposes. (Repealed by County of Merseyside Act 1980 (c. x))
Ascot District Gas and Electricity Act 1926	16 & 17 Geo. 5. c. ix	16 June 1926
An Act to authorise the Ascot District Gas and Electricity Company to raise additional capital and for other purposes.
Chatham and District Water Act 1926	16 & 17 Geo. 5. c. x	16 June 1926
An Act to authorise the Brompton Chatham Gillingham and Rochester Waterworks Company to construct new works and to raise additional capital to change the name of the Company to consolidate and convert the existing capital of the Company and for other purposes.
Darwen Corporation Act 1926	16 & 17 Geo. 5. c. xi	16 June 1926
An Act to confer upon the corporation of Darwen further powers with respect to their tramway water gas and electricity undertakings to consolidate the local rates leviable in the borough to make better provision for the finance of the borough and for other purposes.
Messrs. Hoare Trustees Act 1926	16 & 17 Geo. 5. c. xii	16 June 1926
An Act to provide a new constitution for Messrs. Hoare Trustees and to re-incorporate the same and for other purposes.
Serle Street and Cook's Court Improvement Act 1926	16 & 17 Geo. 5. c. xiii	16 June 1926
An Act to reduce and re-arrange the capital of the Serle Street (Note: Serle Street, Lincoln's Inn Fields, London.) and Cook's Court Improvement Company to change the name of the Company (Note: The company's name was changed from the Serle Street and Cook's Court Improvement Company to the New Court Company.) and for other purposes.
Hackney Borough Council Act 1926	16 & 17 Geo. 5. c. xiv	16 June 1926
An Act to confer further powers upon the mayor aldermen and councillors of the metropolitan borough of Hackney in connection with their electricity undertaking to empower them to acquire lands and construct works to make further provision with regard to the health improvement and good government of the borough and for other purposes.
Ayrshire Electricity Order Confirmation Act 1926 (repealed)	16 & 17 Geo. 5. c. xv	16 June 1926
An Act to confirm a Provisional Order under the Private Legislation Procedure (Scotland) Act 1899 relating to Ayrshire Electricity. (Repealed by South of Scotland Electricity Order Confirmation Act 1956 (4 & 5 Eliz. 2. c. xciv))
	Ayrshire Electricity Order 1926 Provisional Order to extend the time for the compulsory purchase of lands authorised by the Ayr Burgh (Electricity) Act 1922. (Note: Ayr Burgh (Electricity) Act 1922 (12 & 13 Geo. 5. c. lxxiv))	
Helensburgh Gas Order Confirmation Act 1926	16 & 17 Geo. 5. c. xvi	16 June 1926
An Act to confirm a Provisional Order under the Private Legislation Procedure (Scotland) Act 1899 relating to Helenshurgh Gas.
	Helensburgh Gas Order 1926 Provisional Order to authorise the provost magistrates and councillors of the burgh of Helensburgh to extend their gasworks and for other purposes.	
London, Midland and Scottish Railway Order Confirmation Act 1926	16 & 17 Geo. 5. c. xvii	16 June 1926
An Act to confirm a Provisional Order under the Private Legislation Procedure (Scotland) Act 1899 relating to the London Midland and Scottish Railway.
	London, Midland and Scottish Railway Order 1926 Provisional Order to confer further powers upon the London Midland and Scottish Railway Company.	
Provisional Order (Marriages) Confirmation Act 1926 (repealed)	16 & 17 Geo. 5. c. xviii	16 June 1926
An Act to confirm a Provisional Order made by one of His Majesty's Principal Secretaries, of State under the Marriages Validity (Provisional Orders) Acts 1905 (Note: Provisional Order (Marriages) Act 1905 (5 Edw. 7. c. 23)) and 1924. (Note: Marriages Validity (Provisional Orders) Act 1924 (14 & 15 Geo. 5. c. 20)) (Repealed by Statute Law (Repeals) Act 1977 (c. 18))
	St. Mary Childwick Green Order.	
Ministry of Health Provisional Orders Confirmation (No. 1) Act 1926	16 & 17 Geo. 5. c. xix	16 June 1926
An Act to confirm certain Provisional Orders of the Minister of Health relating to Barnsley Maidstone Port Talbot Rochester and Chatham Joint Sewerage District Wakefield and West Kent Main Sewerage District.
	Barnsley Order 1926 Provisional Order to enable the Barnsley Corporation to put in force the Compulsory Clauses of the Lands Clauses Acts.	
	Maidstone Order 1926 Provisional Order to enable the Maidstone Corporation to put in force the Compulsory Clauses of the Lands Clauses Acts.	
	Port Talbot Order 1926 Provisional Order for altering the Aberavon Local Board Act 1866. (Note: Aberavon Local Board Act 1866 (29 & 30 Vict. c. ccxl))	
	Rochester and Chatham Joint Sewerage Order 1926 Provisional Order altering the Local Government Board's Provisional Orders Confirmation (No. 17) Act 1914. (Note: Local Government Board's Provisional Orders Confirmation (No. 17) Act 1914 (4 & 5 Geo. 5. c. cxxxvii))	
	Wakefield Order 1926 Provisional Order for altering a Local Act. (Note: Wakefield Corporation Act 1916 (6 & 7 Geo. 5. c. xx))	
	West Kent Main Sewerage Order 1926 Provisional Order for altering certain Local Acts and Confirming Acts.	
Ministry of Health Provisional Orders Confirmation (No. 2) Act 1926	16 & 17 Geo. 5. c. xx	16 June 1926
An Act to confirm certain Provisional Orders of the Minister of Health relating to Barnet Llanelly Lowestoft Preston St. Helens and Somerset.
	Barnet Order 1926 Provisional Order to enable the Urban District Council of Barnet to put in force the. Compulsory Clauses of the Lands Clauses Acts.	
	Llanelly Order 1926 Provisional Order for amending certain Local Acts.	
	Lowestoft Order 1926 Provisional Order for partially repealing altering or amending the Lowestoft Improvement Act 1854. (Note: Lowestoft Improvement Act 1854 (17 & 18 Vict. c. clxi))	
	Preston Order 1926 Provisional Order for partially repealing altering or amending the Preston Improvement Act 1880. (Note: Preston Improvement Act 1880 (43 & 44 Vict. c. cxviii))	
	St. Helens Order 1926 Provisional Order for altering the St. Helens Corporation Act 1911 (Note: St. Helens Corporation Act 1911 (1 & 2 Geo. 5. c. cxvii)) as altered by certain Confirming Acts.	
	Somerset Order 1926 Provisional Order to enable the County Council of Somerset to put in force the Compulsory Clauses of the Lands Clauses Acts.	
Ministry of Health Provisional Orders Confirmation (No. 3) Act 1926	16 & 17 Geo. 5. c. xxi	30 June 1926
An Act to confirm certain Provisional Orders of the Minister of Health relating to Altrincham Coulsdon and Purley Harrogate Kingston-upon-Thames Oxford and Sunderland.
	Altrincham Order 1926 Provisional Order to enable the Urban District Council of Altrincham to put in force the Compulsory Clauses of the Lands Clauses Acts.	
	Coulsdon and Purley Order 1926 Provisional Order to enable the Urban District Council of Coulsdon and Purley to put in force the Compulsory Clauses of the Lands Clauses Acts.	
	Harrogate Order 1926 Provisional Order for altering certain Local Acts.	
	Kingston-upon-Thames Order 1926 Provisional Order for altering a Local Act (Note: Kingston-upon-Thames Improvement Act 1888 (51 & 52 Vict. c. clxxxiii)) and a Confirming Act. (Note: Ministry of Health Provisional Orders Confirmation (No. 6) Act 1924 (14 & 15 Geo. 5. c. lxxii))	
	Oxford Order 1926 Provisional Order for partially repealing a Local Act. (Note: Oxford Corporation Act 1890 (53 & 54 Vict. c. ccxxiii))	
	Sunderland Order 1926 Provisional Order for partially repealing certain Local Acts.	
Edinburgh Corporation (General Powers) Order Confirmation Act 1926 (repealed)	16 & 17 Geo. 5. c. xxii	30 June 1926
An Act to confirm a Provisional Order under the Private Legislation Procedure (Scotland) Act 1899 relating to Edinburgh Corporation (General Powers). (Repealed by Edinburgh Corporation Order Confirmation Act 1964 (c. xli))
	Edinburgh Corporation (General Powers) Order 1926	
Passmore Edwards (Tilbury) Cottage Hospital Charity Scheme Confirmation Act 1926 (repealed)	16 & 17 Geo. 5. c. xxiii	30 June 1926
An Act to confirm a Scheme of the Charity Commissioners for the application or management of the Charities known as the Passmore Edwards District Cottage Hospital at Tilbury in the County of Essex and the Seamen's Hospital Society in the County of London. (Repealed by Statute Law (Repeals) Act 2013 (c. 2))
	Scheme for the application or management of the following Charities:—: 1. The Charity called or known as the Passmore Edwards District Cottage Hospital at Tilbury in the County of Essex; 2. The Charity known as the Seamen's Hospital Society in the County of London.	
Allhallows and Marwood (Honiton) Charities Scheme Confirmation Act 1926	16 & 17 Geo. 5. c. xxiv	30 June 1926
An Act to confirm a Scheme of the Charity Commissioners for the application or management of the two Charities known as Allhallows Charity and the Charity of Thomas Marwood respectively both in the Parish of Honiton in the County of Devon.
	Scheme for the application or management of the following Charities in the Parish of Honiton in the County of Devon:—: 1. The Charity called or known as Allhallows Charity regulated by an Indenture dated 20th July 15 Henry VIII. and the Act of Parliament 5 & 6 Will. IV. c. xvii.; (Note: Honiton Parish Church Act 1835 (5 & 6 Will. 4. c. xvii)); 2. The Charity of Thomas Marwood founded by will dated 14th September 1617.	
Robert Earl of Leicester's Hospital Charity Scheme Confirmation Act 1926 (repealed)	16 & 17 Geo. 5. c. xxv	30 June 1926
An Act to confirm a Scheme of the Charity Commissioners for the application or management of the Charity called the Hospital of Robert Earl of Leicester in Warwick in the County of Warwick. (Repealed by Statute Law (Repeals) Act 2013 (c. 2))
	Scheme for the application or management of the Charity called the Hospital of Robert Earl of Leicester in Warwick in the County of Warwick.	
Brighton (London Road) Congregational Chapel Charities Scheme Confirmation Act 1926	16 & 17 Geo. 5. c. xxvi	30 June 1926
An Act to confirm a Scheme of the Charity Commissioners for the application or management of the Charities consisting of the London Road Congregational Chapel and the net proceeds of sale of the Trust Property in Hanover Place both in the Borough of Brighton in the County of Sussex.
	Scheme for the application or management of the following Charities in the Borough of Brighton in the County of Sussex:—: 1. The Charity consisting of the London Road Congregational Chapel comprised in an Indenture dated 8th February 1830; 2. The Charity consisting of the net proceeds of sale of the Trust Property in Hanover Place comprised in an Indenture dated 9th August 1826.	
Doncaster Corporation Act 1926 (repealed)	16 & 17 Geo. 5. c. xxvii	30 June 1926
An Act to constitute the borough of Doncaster a county borough to enable the Corporation of that borough to provide and work trolley vehicles to consolidate the rates of the borough to make better provision for the local government and finance of the borough and for other purposes. (Repealed by Statute Law (Repeals) Act 1989 (c. 43))
Medway Conservancy Act 1926 (repealed)	16 & 17 Geo. 5. c. xxviii	30 June 1926
An Act to amend certain provisions of the Medway Conservancy Act 1881 (Note: Medway Conservancy Act 1881 (44 & 45 Vict. c. clxxiv)) relating to proxies and to vessels sunk or stranded. (Repealed by Medway Ports Reorganisation Scheme 1968 Confirmation Order 1969 (SI 1969/1045))
Halifax Corporation Act 1926 (repealed)	16 & 17 Geo. 5. c. xxix	30 June 1926
An Act to empower the corporation of Halifax to execute street improvements and to confer further powers on them with respect to their several undertakings and for other purposes. (Repealed by West Yorkshire Act 1980 (c. xiv))
Hartlepool Corporation (Trolley Vehicles) Act 1926	16 & 17 Geo. 5. c. xxx	30 June 1926
An Act to empower the mayor aldermen and burgesses of the borough of Hartlepool to work trolley vehicles and for other purposes.
Ramsbottom Urban District Council Act 1926	16 & 17 Geo. 5. c. xxxi	30 June 1926
An Act to empower the urban district council of Ramsbottom to provide and work omnibuses within and beyond their district to make further provision in regard to the railless traction undertaking of the Council and for other purposes.
London, Midland and Scottish Railway Act 1926	16 & 17 Geo. 5. c. xxxii	30 June 1926
An Act to empower the London Midland and Scottish Railway Company to construct a railway (Note: Welbeck Colliery branch, Nottinghamshire.) and for other purposes.
Taf Fechan Water Supply Act 1926	16 & 17 Geo. 5. c. xxxiii	30 June 1926
An Act to empower the Taf Fechan Water Supply Board to acquire lands to extend the time for the construction of waterworks by the Board and for other purposes.
Leicestershire and Warwickshire Electric Power Act 1926	16 & 17 Geo. 5. c. xxxiv	30 June 1926
An Act to authorise the Leicestershire and Warwickshire Electric Power Company to raise additional capital to confer further powers upon the Company and for other purposes.
Abertillery and District Water Board Act 1926 (repealed)	16 & 17 Geo. 5. c. xxxv	8 July 1926
An Act to confer further powers on the Abertillery and District Water Board. (Repealed by Gwent Water Board Order 1969 (SI 1969/1475))
Connah's Quay Urban District Council Water Act 1926	16 & 17 Geo. 5. c. xxxvi	8 July 1926
An Act to provide for the transfer of the water undertaking of the Connah's Quay Gas and Water Company Limited to the urban district council of Connah's Quay to authorise the Council to supply water in their district and for other purposes.
Glasgow Education Authority (Juvenile Delinquency) Order Confirmation Act 1926 (repealed)	16 & 17 Geo. 5. c. xxxvii	8 July 1926
An Act to confirm a Provisional Order under the Private Legislation Procedure (Scotland) Act 1899 relating to Glasgow Education Authority (Juvenile Delinquency). (Repealed by Statute Law (Repeals) Act 1998 (c. 43))
	Glasgow Education Authority (Juvenile Delinquency) Order 1926 Provisional Order for the transfer to the Education Authority of the Burgh of Glasgow of the powers and duties and whole assets and liabilities of the Commissioners for the Prevention and Repression of Juvenile Delinquency in the city of Glasgow and of the Directors of Houses of Refuge and Reformatory and Industrial Schools in the city of Glasgow to dissolve such Commissioners and Directors to repeal the Glasgow Juvenile Delinquency Prevention and Repression Acts 1878 (Note: Glasgow Juvenile Delinquency Prevention and Repression Act 1878 (41 & 42 Vict. c. cxxi)) and 1896 (Note: Glasgow Juvenile Delinquency Prevention and Repression Amendment Act 1896 (59 & 60 Vict. c. xxxv)) to repeal certain Orders pronounced by the Secretary for Scotland in pursuance of section 132 of the Children Act 1908 (Note: Children Act 1908 (8 Edw. 7. c. 67)) and for other purposes.	
Ministry of Health Provisional Order Confirmation (Ilfracombe) Act 1926	16 & 17 Geo. 5. c. xxxviii	8 July 1926
An Act to confirm a Provisional Order of the Minister of Health relating to Ilfracombe.
	Ilfracombe Order 1926 Provisional Order to enable the Urban District Council of Ilfracombe to put in force the Compulsory Clauses of the Lands Clauses Acts.	
Land Drainage Provisional Order Confirmation (No. 1) Act 1926	16 & 17 Geo. 5. c. xxxix	15 July 1926
An Act to confirm a Provisional Order under the Land Drainage Act 1918 (Note: Land Drainage Act 1918 (8 & 9 Geo. 5. c. 17)) relating to a Drainage District in the administrative county of Westmorland.
	Westmorland Drainage Order 1926 Westmorland Drainage District.	
Provisional Order (Marriages) Confirmation (No. 2) Act 1926 (repealed)	16 & 17 Geo. 5. c. xl	15 July 1926
An Act to confirm a Provisional Order made by one of His Majesty's Principal Secretaries of State under the Marriages Validity (Provisional Orders) Acts 1905 and 1924. (Repealed by Statute Law (Repeals) Act 1977 (c. 18))
	Saint Nicholas Shaldon Order.	
North Berwick Burgh Extension Order Confirmation Act 1926	16 & 17 Geo. 5. c. xli	15 July 1926
An Act to confirm a Provisional Order under the Private Legislation Procedure (Scotland) Act 1899 relating to North Berwick Burgh Extension.
	North Berwick Burgh Extension Order 1926 Provisional Order to extend the boundaries of the burgh of North Berwick and for other purposes.	
Pier and Harbour Order Confirmation Act 1926	16 & 17 Geo. 5. c. xlii	15 July 1926
An Act to confirm a Provisional Order made by the Minister of Transport under the General Pier and Harbour Act 1861 (Note: General Pier and Harbour Act 1861 (24 & 25 Vict. c. 45)) relating to Inverness Harbour.
	Inverness Harbour Order 1926 Provisional Order to increase the maximum dues and rates leviable by the Trustees of the Harbour of Inverness.	
Falmouth Docks Act 1926 (repealed)	16 & 17 Geo. 5. c. xliii	15 July 1926
An Act to authorise the Falmouth Docks and Engineering Company to construct a new dry dock and for other purposes. (Repealed by Falmouth Docks Act 1959 (7 & 8 Eliz. 2. c. xl))
Bermondsey Borough Council (Street Trading) Act 1926 (repealed)	16 & 17 Geo. 5. c. xliv	15 July 1926
An Act to enable the mayor aldermen and councillors of the metropolitan borough of Bermondsey to control the carrying on of trading in the streets of the borough and for other purposes. (Repealed by Local Law (Greater London Council and Inner London Boroughs) Order 1965 (SI 1965/540))
Mid-Nottinghamshire Joint Railways Act 1926	16 & 17 Geo. 5. c. xlv	15 July 1926
An Act to authorise the construction of new railways in the county of Nottingham to constitute a joint committee of the London Midland and Scottish Railway Company and the London and North Eastern Railway Company and for other purposes.
Rhymney Valley Water Act 1926 (repealed)	16 & 17 Geo. 5. c. xlvi	15 July 1926
An Act to confer further powers on the Rhymney Valley Water Board to extend the time for the completion of an aqueduct to amend the Rhymney Valley Water Act 1921 (Note: Rhymney Valley Water Act 1921 (11 & 12 Geo. 5. c. lxxxiii)) and for other purposes. (Repealed by Taf Fechan Water Board Order 1964 (SI 1965/1588))
Shoreham Harbour Act 1926	16 & 17 Geo. 5. c. xlvii	15 July 1926
An Act to re-arrange the finances of and reconstitute and re-incorporate the Shoreham Harbour Trustees to consolidate with amendments the Acts relating to the Trustees to change the name of the harbour and for other purposes.
Bethlem Hospital Act 1926	16 & 17 Geo. 5. c. xlviii	15 July 1926
An Act to provide for the removal of the Bethlem Hospital to the Monks Orchard Estate at Addington in Surrey and Beckenham and West Wickham in Kent and for the disposal of the existing hospital premises and convalescent home and the vesting of the said hospital premises or part thereof in the London County Council as an open space and for other purposes.
Trent Falls Improvement Act 1926	16 & 17 Geo. 5. c. xlix	15 July 1926
An Act to authorise the Undertakers of the Aire and Calder Navigation to construct training walls in the rivers Humber and Trent at Trent Falls to provide for payment by the Humber Conservancy Board of the cost of constructing the said training walls and for other purposes.
Port of London Act 1926 (repealed)	16 & 17 Geo. 5. c. l	15 July 1926
An Act to extend the time for the construction of works authorised by the Port of London Act 1917 to confer further powers on the Port of London Authority and for other purposes. (Repealed by Port of London Act 1967 (c. xxxii))
Pontefract Corporation Act 1926 (repealed)	16 & 17 Geo. 5. c. li	15 July 1926
An Act to amend and partially repeal the Pontefract Borough Extension Act 1875 (Note: Pontefract Borough Extension Act 1875 (38 & 39 Vict. c. lxxxii)) to consolidate and to make further provision in regard to the rates levied in the borough of Pontefract and for other purposes. (Repealed by West Yorkshire Act 1980 (c. xiv))
Post Office (Sites) Act 1926 (repealed)	16 & 17 Geo. 5. c. lii	4 August 1926
An Act to enable His Majesty's Postmaster-General to acquire lands in Blackpool, Swansea and Doncaster for the public service, and for other purposes. (Repealed by Postal Services Act 2000 (Consequential Modifications to Local Enactments) Order 2003 (SI 2003/1542))
Ministry of Health Provisional Orders Confirmation (No. 4) Act 1926	16 & 17 Geo. 5. c. liii	4 August 1926
An Act to confirm certain Provisional Orders of the Minister of Health relating to Brighton East Barnet Valley Keighley Keswick Lichfield and Rotherham.
	Brighton Order 1926 Provisional Order for amending certain.Local Acts.	
	East Barnet Valley Order 1926 Provisional Order to enable the Urban District Council of East Barnet Valley to put in force the Compulsory Clauses of the Lands Clauses Acts.	
	Keighley Order 1926 Provisional Order to enable the Keighley Corporation to put in force the Compulsory Clauses of the Lands Clauses Acts.	
	Keswick Order 1926 Provisional Order for amending the Keswick Urban District Council (Water) Act 1907. (Note: Keswick Urban District Council (Water) Act 1907 (7 Edw. 7. c. xxvii))	
	Lichfield Order 1926 Provisional Order for partially repealing the Local Act 46 Geo. III. Сар. 42 (Note: City of Lichfield Improvement Act 1806 (46 Geo. 3. c. xlii)) relating to the City of Lichfield.	
	Rotherham Order 1926 Provisional Order to enable the Rotherham Corporation to put in force the Compulsory Clauses of the Lands Clauses Acts.	
Ministry of Health Provisional Orders Confirmation (No. 5) Act 1926	16 & 17 Geo. 5. c. liv	4 August 1926
An Act to confirm certain Provisional Orders of the Minister of Health relating to Fylde Preston and Garstang Joint Smallpox Hospital District Newquay Pontefract Stoke-on-Trent Swanage and Watford.
	Fylde, Preston and Garstang Joint Smallpox Hospital Order 1926 Provisional Order for altering a Confirming Act. (Note: Local Government Board's Provisional Orders Confirmation (No. 14) Act 1905 (5 Edw. 7. c. cix))	
	Newquay Order 1926 Provisional Order to enable the Urban District Council of Newquay to put in force the Compulsory Clauses of the Lands Clauses Acts.	
	Pontefract Order 1926 Provisional Order for altering certain Local Acts.	
	Stoke-on-Trent Order 1926 Provisional Order to enable the Stoke-on-Trent Corporation to put in force the Compulsory Clauses of the Lands Clauses Acts.	
	Swanage Order 1926 Provisional Order to enable the Urban District Council of Swanage to put in force the Compulsory Clauses of the Lands Clauses Acts.	
	Watford Order 1926 Provisional Order to enable the Watford Corporation to put in force the Compulsory Clauses of the Lands Clauses Acts.	
Ministry of Health Provisional Orders Confirmation (No. 6) Act 1926	16 & 17 Geo. 5. c. lv	4 August 1926
An Act to confirm certain Provisional Orders of the Minister of Health relating to Hythe King's Lynn Liverpool Middleton Sandown and Shanklin Joint Hospital District and Isle of Wight Joint Hospital District and Sheffield.
	Hythe Order 1926 Provisional Order for altering the Hythe Corporation Act 1905. (Note: Hythe Corporation Act 1905 (5 Edw. 7. c. xcvi))	
	King's Lynn Order 1926 Provisional Order for partially repealing certain Local Acts.	
	Liverpool Order 1926 Provisional Order for altering the Liverpool Corporation Act 1921. (Note: Liverpool Corporation Act 1921 (11 & 12 Geo. 5. c. lxxiv))	
	Middleton Order 1926 Provisional Order to enable the Middleton Corporation to put in force the Compulsory Clauses of the Lands Clauses Acts.	
	Isle of Wight Joint Hospital Order 1926 Provisional Order for repealing and amending certain Confirming Acts.	
	Sheffield Order 1926 Provisional Order for altering the Sheffield Corporation (Consolidation) Act 1918. (Note: Sheffield Corporation (Consolidation) Act 1918 (8 & 9 Geo. 5. c. lxi))	
Ministry of Health Provisional Orders Confirmation (No. 7) Act 1926	16 & 17 Geo. 5. c. lvi	4 August 1926
An Act to confirm certain Provisional Orders of the Minister of Health relating to Cranleigh District Water Southwold Water and West Surrey Water.
	Cranleigh District Water Order 1926 Provisional Order under the Gas and Water Works Facilities Act 1870 (Note: Gas and Water Works Facilities Act 1870 (33 & 34 Vict. c. 70)) and the Gas and Water Works Facilities Act 1870 Amendment Act 1873 (Note: Gas and Water Works Facilities Act 1870 Amendment Act 1873 (36 & 37 Vict. c. 89)) to make provision for the transfer to the Cranleigh Water Company Limited of the undertaking authorised by the Chiddingfold and District Water Order 1912 to extend the limits of supply of the Company to authorise them to raise additional capital and for other purposes.	
	Southwold Water Order 1926 Frovisional Order under the Gas and Water Works Facilities Act 1870 and the Gas and Water Works Facilities Act 1870 Amendment Act 1873 empowering the Southwold Waterworks Company Limited to supply water in bulk outside their statutory limits of supply.	
	West Surrey Water Order 1926 Provisional Order under the Gas and Water Works Facilities Act 1870 and the Gas and Water Works Facilities Act 1870 Amendment Act 1873 for empowering the West Surrey Water Company to increase their capital and for other purposes.	
Ministry of Health Provisional Orders Confirmation (No. 8) Act 1926	16 & 17 Geo. 5. c. lvii	4 August 1926
An Act to confirm certain Provisional Orders of the Minister of Health relating to Dunstable Water Harpenden Water and Heathfield and District Water.
	Dunstable Water Order 1926 Provisional Order under the Gas and Water Works Facilities Act 1870 and the Gas and Water Works Facilities Act 1870 Amendment Act 1873 for empowering the Dunstable Gas and Water Company to raise additional capital and for other purposes.	
	Harpenden Water Order 1926 Provisional Order under the Gas and Water Works Facilities Act 1870 and the Gas and Water Works Facilities Act 1870 Amendment Act 1873 for empowering the Harpenden Water Company Limited to construct further works to extend their area of supply to raise additional capital and for other purposes.	
	Heathfield and District Water Order 1926 Provisional Order under the Gas and Water Works Facilities Act 1870 and the Gas and Water Works Facilities Act 1870 Amendment Act 1873 empowering the Heathfield and District Water Company to maintain and continue waterworks and supply water in bulk to extend the limits of supply of the Company to authorise them to raise additional capital and for other purposes.	
Ministry of Health Provisional Orders Confirmation (No. 9) Act 1926	16 & 17 Geo. 5. c. lviii	4 August 1926
An Act to confirm certain Provisional Orders of the Minister of Health relating to Thorne and District Water Trowbridge Water and Wokingham District Water.
	Thorne and District Water Order 1926 Provisional Order under the Gas and Water Works Facilities Act 1870 and the Gas and Water Works Facilities Act 1870 Amendment Act 1873 empowering the Thorne and District Water Company to construct waterworks to raise additional capital and for other purposes.	
	Trowbridge Water Order 1926 Provisional Order under the Gas and Water Works Trowbridge Facilities Act 1870 and the Gas and Water Works Facilities Act 1870 Amendment Act 1873 to authorise the construction and maintenance of waterworks and for other purposes.	
	Wokingham District Water Order 1926 Provisional Order authorising the Wokingham District Water Company Limited to raise additional capital and to maintain existing waterworks in the Rural Districts of Wokingham and Easthampstead and for other purposes.	
Ministry of Health Provisional Orders Confirmation (No. 10) Act 1926	16 & 17 Geo. 5. c. lix	4 August 1926
An Act to confirm certain Provisional Orders of the Minister of Health relating to Hertford and Middlesex and Watford.
	Counties of Hertford and Middlesex Order 1926 Provisional Order made in pursuance of the Local Government Act 1888 (Note: Local Government Act 1888 (51 & 52 Vict. c. 41)) for altering the boundary between Counties.	
	Watford (Extension) Order 1926 Provisional Order made in pursuance of the Local Government Act 1888 for the extension of a Borough.	
Ministry of Health Provisional Orders Confirmation (No. 11) Act 1926	16 & 17 Geo. 5. c. lx	4 August 1926
An Act to confirm certain Provisional Orders of the Minister of Health relating to Chester Leyton Nantwich Scarborough Spalding and Wimbledon.
	Chester Order 1926 Provisional Order to enable the Chester Corporation to put in force the Compulsory Clauses of the Lands Clauses Acts.	
	Leyton Order 1926 Provisional Order for partially repealing and altering certain Local Acts.	
	Nantwich Order 1926 Provisional Order to enable the Urban District Council of Nantwich to put in force the Compulsory Clauses of the Lands Clauses Acts.	
	Scarborough Order 1926 Provisional Order for altering and amending certain Local Acts.	
	Spalding Order 1926 Provisional Order for altering the Spalding Water Act 1900. (Note: Spalding Water Act 1900 (63 & 64 Vict. c. cvii))	
	Wimbledon Order 1926 Provisional Order to enable the Wimbledon Corporation to put in force the Compulsory Clauses of the Lands Clauses Acts.	
Ministry of Health Provisional Order Confirmation (Ashton-under-Lyne Extension) Act 1926	16 & 17 Geo. 5. c. lxi	4 August 1926
An Act to confirm a Provisional Order of the Minister of Health relating to Ashton-under-Lyne.
	Ashton-under-Lyne (Extension) Order 1926 Provisional Order made in pursuance of the Local Government Act 1888 for the extension of a Borough.	
Ministry of Health Provisional Order Confirmation (Ealing Extension) Act 1926 (repealed)	16 & 17 Geo. 5. c. lxii	4 August 1926
An Act to confirm a Provisional Order of the Minister of Health relating to Ealing. (Repealed by Local Law (North West London Boroughs) Order 1965 (SI 1965/533))
	Ealing (Extension) Order 1926 Provisional Order made in pursuance of the Local Government Act 1888 for the extension of a Borough.	
Tramways Provisional Order Act 1926 (repealed)	16 & 17 Geo. 5. c. lxiii	4 August 1926
An Act to confirm a Provisional Order made by the Minister of Transport under the Tramways Act 1870 (Note: Tramways Act 1870 (33 & 34 Vict. c. 78)) relating to Leicester Corporation Tramways. (Repealed by Leicester Corporation Act 1956 (4 & 5 Eliz. 2. c. xlix))
	Leicester Corporation Tramways Order 1926 Order authorising the Corporation of Leicester to construct additional Tramways in the City of Leicester and for other purposes.	
Land Drainage Provisional Order Confirmation (No. 2) Act 1926	16 & 17 Geo. 5. c. lxiv	4 August 1926
An Act to confirm a Provisional Order under the Land Drainage Acts 1861 (Note: Land Drainage Act 1861 (24 & 25 Vict. c. 133)) and 1918 amending the Land Drainage (Ouse) Provisional Order Confirmation Act 1925. (Note: Land Drainage (Ouse) Provisional Order Confirmation Act 1925 (15 & 16 Geo. 5. c. lxxii))
	Land Drainage (Ouse) Order 1926 Ouse Drainage District.	
Edinburgh Corporation (Streets Buildings and Sewers) Order Confirmation Act 1926 (repealed)	16 & 17 Geo. 5. c. lxv	4 August 1926
An Act to confirm a Provisional Order under the Private Legislation Procedure (Scotland) Act 1899 relating to Edinburgh Corporation (Streets Buildings and Sewers). (Repealed by Edinburgh Order Confirmation Order Confirmation 1967 (c. v))
	Edinburgh Corporation (Streets Buildings and Sewers) Order 1926 Provisional Order to consolidate with amendments the Acts and Orders of or relating to the Corporation of the city and royal burgh of Edinburgh in so far as pertaining to the Dean of Guild Court to the regulation control and administration of streets buildings sewers drains streams watercourses sky signs and advertisements and other cognate matters and to the river or stream known as the Water of Leith; to confer further powers upon the Corporation in respect of these matters and for other purposes.	
Dundee Corporation Order Confirmation Act 1926 (repealed)	16 & 17 Geo. 5. c. lxvi	4 August 1926
An Act to confirm a Provisional Order under the Private Legislation Procedure (Scotland) Act 1899 relating to Dundee Corporation. (Repealed by Dundee Corporation (Water, Transport, Finance, &c.) Order Confirmation Act 1954 (2 & 3 Eliz. 2. c. ix))
	Dundee Corporation Order 1926 Provisional Order to transfer to and vest in the Corporation the undertakings of the Dundee Gas Commissioners and the Dundee Water Commissioners to make provision with respect to the borrowing of money for and the management of the finances of the Corporation and for other purposes.	
Greenock Corporation Order Confirmation Act 1926	16 & 17 Geo. 5. c. lxvii	4 August 1926
An Act to confirn a Provisional Order under the Private Legislation Procedure (Scotland) Act 1899 relating to Greenock Corporation.
	Greenock Corporation Order 1926 Provisional Order to extend the time for the compulsory purchase of lands for the purposes of the Greenock Corporation Order 1923 to confer further financial powers upon the Corporation of Greenock and for other purposes.	
Church of Scotland Ministers' and Scottish University Professors' Widows' Fund (Amendment) Order Confirmation Act 1926 (repealed)	16 & 17 Geo. 5. c. lxviii	4 August 1926
An Act to confirm a Provisional Order under the Private Legislation Procedure (Scotland) Act 1899 relating to the Church of Scotland Ministers' and Scottish University Professors' Widows' Fund (Amendment). (Repealed by Churches and Universities (Scotland) Widows' and Orphans' Fund Order Confirmation Act 1930 (20 & 21 Geo. 5. c. cxxxiv))
	Church of Scotland Ministers' and Scottish University Professors' Widows' Fund (Amendment) Order 1926 Provisional Order to amend the Church of Scotland Ministers' and Scottish University Professors' Widows Fund Order 1923 and for other purposes.	
Kilmarnock Corporation Order Confirmation Act 1926	16 & 17 Geo. 5. c. lxix	4 August 1926
An Act to confirm a Provisional Order under the Private Legislation Procedure (Scotland) Act 1899 relating to Kilmarnock Corporation.
	Kilmarnock Corporation Order 1926 Provisional Order to provide for the Abandonment of the Tramways within the burgh of Kilmarnock and for other purposes.	
Paignton Urban District Council Act 1926	16 & 17 Geo. 5. c. lxx	4 August 1926
An Act to empower the urban district council of Paignton to construct additional waterworks to make further provision with regard to their water undertaking and the supply of water to other local authorities in bulk to extend the Council's water limits to make further and better provision for the health local government and improvement of their district and for other purposes.
Teignmouth and Shaldon Bridge Act 1926	16 & 17 Geo. 5. c. lxxi	4 August 1926
An Act to authorise the improvement of the bridge over the River Teign at Teignmouth in the county of Devon to make further provision in regard to the ferry across the said river at Teignmouth and for other purposes.
Chorley Corporation Act 1926	16 & 17 Geo. 5. c. lxxii	4 August 1926
An Act to confer further powers upon the mayor aldermen and burgesses of the borough of Chorley in connection with their several undertakings to consolidate the rates of the borough and to make better provision for the health local government and finance of the borough and for other purposes.
Kidderminster and Stourport Electric Tramway Act 1926 (repealed)	16 & 17 Geo. 5. c. lxxiii	4 August 1926
An Act to empower the Kidderminster and Stourport Electric Tramway Company to reconstruct a tramway and execute certain other works to confer further borrowing powers upon the Company and for other purposes. (Repealed by Statute Law (Repeals) Act 1998 (c. 43))
Kingston-upon-Hull Corporation Act 1926	16 & 17 Geo. 5. c. lxxiv	4 August 1926
An Act to empower the lord mayor aldermen and citizens of the city and county of Kingston upon Hull to construct bridges across the River Hull and the Hedon Haven tramways and waterworks to extend their limits for the supply of water to make further provision in regard to their water undertaking and for other purposes.
Mynyddislwyn Urban District Council Act 1926	16 & 17 Geo. 5. c. lxxv	4 August 1926
An Act to empower the urban district council of Mynyddislwyn to acquire lands for an arterial road to make further provision in regard to the electricity and gas undertakings of the Council and to the health good government and finances of their district to incorporate the West Monmouthshire Omnibus Board and to empower the Board to provide and run omnibuses and for other purposes.
Mexborough and Swinton Tramways Act 1926 (repealed)	16 & 17 Geo. 5. c. lxxvi	4 August 1926
An Act to authorise the Mexborough and Swinton Tramways Company to provide and work trolley vehicles on additional routes and for other purposes. (Repealed by Post Office Act 1969 (c. 48))
Bolton Corporation Act 1926	16 & 17 Geo. 5. c. lxxvii	4 August 1926
An Act to empower the mayor aldermen and burgesses of the county borough of Bolton to acquire lands for various purposes to confer upon them further powers of running omnibuses to make further provision with reference to the improvement health and good government of the borough and for other purposes.
Scottish Widows' Fund and Life Assurance Society's Act 1926 (repealed)	16 & 17 Geo. 5. c. lxxviii	4 August 1926
An Act to consolidate and amend the constitution Acts and regulations of the Scottish Widows Fund and Life Assurance Society to confer further powers on that Society and for other purposes. (Repealed by Scottish Widows' Fund and Life Assurance Society Act 1980 (c. xxxv))
London County Council (Money) Act 1926 (repealed)	16 & 17 Geo. 5. c. lxxix	4 August 1926
An Act to regulate the expenditure on capital account and lending of money by the London County Council during the financial period from the first day of April one thousand nine hundred and twenty-six to the thirtieth day of September one thousand nine hundred and twenty-seven and for other purposes. (Repealed by London County Council (Loans) Act 1955 (4 & 5 Eliz. 2. c. xxvi))
Colwyn Bay Urban District Council Act 1926 (repealed)	16 & 17 Geo. 5. c. lxxx	4 August 1926
An Act to empower the urban district council of Colwyn Bay to run omnibuses to confer further powers on the Council with regard to the distribution of water the supply of electricity the purchase of lands for various purposes and the health local government and improvement of the district to provide for the consolidation of the parishes in the district and the consolidation of the rates of the district and for other purposes. (Repealed by Clwyd County Council Act 1985 (c. xliv))
Margate Corporation Act 1926	16 & 17 Geo. 5. c. lxxxi	4 August 1926
An Act to empower the mayor aldermen and burgesses of the borough of Margate to construct street improvements sea walls and promenades and a reservoir and to purchase lands for various purposes to make further provision with regard to the health local government and improvement of the borough and for other purposes.
West Hampshire Water Act 1926	16 & 17 Geo. 5. c. lxxxii	4 August 1926
An Act to authorise the West Hampshire Water Company to construct new works and to raise additional capital to confirm the construction of certain existing works to extend the Company's limits of supply and for other purposes.
Manchester Ship Canal Act 1926	16 & 17 Geo. 5. c. lxxxiii	4 August 1926
An Act to empower the Manchester Ship Canal Company to construct railways and divert a footpath to provide for the sub-division of the shares of the Company and for other purposes.
University of Reading Act 1926	16 & 17 Geo. 5. c. lxxxiv	4 August 1926
An Act to dissolve University College Reading and to transfer all the property and liabilities of that College to the University of Reading and for other purposes.
Guildford Corporation Act 1926	16 & 17 Geo. 5. c. lxxxv	4 August 1926
An Act to provide for the transfer to the mayor aldermen and burgesses of the borough of Guildford from the Woking Water and Gas Company of a well and pumping station situate within that borough to authorise the Corporation to maintain and construct waterworks to confer further powers upon the Corporation in regard to their water and electricity undertakings and the health local government and improvement of the borough to provide for the consolidation of the rates of the borough and for other purposes.
Middlesbrough Corporation Act 1926 (repealed)	16 & 17 Geo. 5. c. lxxxvi	4 August 1926
An Act to consolidate the rates and to make further provision with respect to the finances of the borough of Middlesbrough and for other purposes. (Repealed by Middlesbrough Corporation Act 1933 (23 & 24 Geo. 5. c. lxxxiii))
Dover Harbour Act 1926 (repealed)	16 & 17 Geo. 5. c. lxxxvii	4 August 1926
An Act to authorise the construction of certain new works for improving the harbour of Dover the raising of further moneys by the Dover Harbour Board and for other purposes. (Repealed by Dover Harbour Act 1953 (1 & 2 Eliz. 2. c. xxix))
Great Western Railway Act 1926	16 & 17 Geo. 5. c. lxxxviii	4 August 1926
An Act for conferring further powers upon the Great Western Railway Company and for other purposes.
London Electric and Metropolitan District Railway Companies Act 1926	16 & 17 Geo. 5. c. lxxxix	4 August 1926
An Act to empower the London Electric and Metropolitan District Railway Companies to execute works and the London Electric Railway Company to raise additional capital to confer further powers on the said and other companies and for other purposes.
Manchester Ship Canal (Staff Superannuation) Act 1926 (repealed)	16 & 17 Geo. 5. c. xc	4 August 1926
An Act to provide for the establishment of a superannuation scheme for officers and servants of the Manchester Ship Canal Company and for other purposes. (Repealed by Manchester Ship Canal Harbour Revision Order 2009 (SI 2009/2579))
Metropolitan Railway Act 1926	16 & 17 Geo. 5. c. xci	4 August 1926
An Act to empower the Metropolitan Railway Company to construct new railways and other works and to acquire lands to revive and extend the time for the compulsory purchase of certain lands to extend the time for the compulsory purchase of certain other lands and the completion of certain works to raise additional capital to confer further powers on that Company and the London and North Eastern Railway Company and on the Metropolitan and Great Central Joint Committee and for other purposes.
Southern Railway Act 1926	16 & 17 Geo. 5. c. xcii	4 August 1926
An Act to empower the Southern Railway Company to construct works and acquire lands to confirm the construction of certain works to extend the time for the compulsory purchase of certain lands to transfer to the said Company the undertaking of the Newhaven Harbour Company and for other purposes.
Swindon Corporation Act 1926	16 & 17 Geo. 5. c. xciii	4 August 1926
An Act to enable the Corporation of the borough of Swindon to acquire lands to run omnibuses to extend their limits of supply for electricity and for other purposes.
Berwick-upon-Tweed Corporation (Freemen) Act 1926	16 & 17 Geo. 5. c. xciv	4 August 1926
An Act to appoint new Trustees of certain lands tenements and hereditaments vested in the mayor aldermen and burgesses of the borough of Berwick-upon-Tweed to make further provisions with respect to the said lands tenements and hereditaments and for other purposes.
Eastbourne Corporation Act 1926	16 & 17 Geo. 5. c. xcv	4 August 1926
An Act to empower the mayor aldermen and burgesses of the borough of Eastbourne to acquire the Downs and Downland in and near the borough to make further provision with regard to the improvement of the borough and the electricity undertaking of the Corporation to authorise the consolidation of the rates of the borough and for other purposes.
Rhondda Urban District Council Act 1926 (repealed)	16 & 17 Geo. 5. c. xcvi	4 August 1926
An Act to extend the time limited for the construction of certain tramways and street works to confer further powers on the Rhondda Urban District Council with respect to their water undertaking and for other purposes. (Repealed by Rhondda Corporation Act 1973 (c. xxiii))
Worcester Corporation Act 1926 (repealed)	16 & 17 Geo. 5. c. xcvii	4 August 1926
An Act to empower the mayor aldermen and citizens of the city of Worcester to provide and work tramways light railways trolley vehicles and omnibuses to make further provision with regard to the improvement of the city and for other purposes. (Repealed by Worcester City Council Act 1985 (c. xliii))
London County Council (General Powers) Act 1926	16 & 17 Geo. 5. c. xcviii	4 August 1926
An Act to confer further powers upon the London County Council and upon the corporation of the city of London and metropolitan borough councils and for other purposes.
Bristol Corporation Act 1926	16 & 17 Geo. 5. c. xcix	4 August 1926
An Act to empower the lord mayor aldermen and burgesses of the city of Bristol to execute works to confer further powers upon them with reference to their dock and electricity undertakings to extend the boundaries of the city to enact provisions for the health local government and improvement of the city and for other purposes.
Stoke-on-Trent Corporation Act 1926	16 & 17 Geo. 5. c. c	4 August 1926
An Act to confer powers upon the mayor aldermen and citizens of the city of Stoke-on-Trent with respect to a railway level crossing and for other purposes.
Newcastle-upon-Tyne and Gateshead Corporations (Bridge) Act 1926 (repealed)	16 & 17 Geo. 5. c. ci	4 August 1926
An Act to empower the lord mayor aldermen and citizens of the city and county of Newcastle-upon-Tyne and the mayor aldermen and burgesses of the county borough of Gateshead to provide lifts warehouses and other works in connection with the bridge authorised by the Newcastle-upon-Tyne and Gateshead Corporations (Bridge) Act 1924 (Note: Newcastle-upon-Tyne and Gateshead Corporations (Bridge) Act 1924 (14 & 15 Geo. 5. c. xcvii)) and for other purposes. (Repealed by Tyne and Wear Act 1976 (c. xxxvi))
Newcastle-upon-Tyne Corporation Act 1926 (repealed)	16 & 17 Geo. 5. c. cii	4 August 1926
An Act to confer further powers upon the lord mayor aldermen and citizens of the city and county of Newcastle-upon-Tyne to enact provisions for the health local government and improvement of the said city and for other purposes. (Repealed by Newcastle-upon-Tyne Town Moor Act 1988 (c. xxxi))
Shropshire, Worcestershire and Staffordshire Electric Power Act 1926 (repealed)	16 & 17 Geo. 5. c. ciii	4 August 1926
An Act to provide for the merger of the separate undertaking and the general undertaking of the Shropshire Worcestershire and Staffordshire Electric Power Company to confer further powers upon that Company and for other purposes. (Repealed by Shropshire, Worcestershire and Staffordshire Electric Power (Consolidation) Act 1938 (1 & 2 Geo. 6. c. lviii))
Southend-on-Sea Corporation Act 1926	16 & 17 Geo. 5. c. civ	4 August 1926
An Act to confer further powers upon the mayor aldermen and burgesses of the borough of Southend-on-Sea with respect to the disposal of sewage to make further provision with regard to the improvement of the borough and the health and good government thereof and for other purposes.
Gas Light and Coke Company's Act 1926	16 & 17 Geo. 5. c. cv	4 August 1926
An Act to confer additional borrowing powers upon the Gas Light and Coke Company and for other purposes.
Wolverhampton Corporation Act 1926 (repealed)	16 & 17 Geo. 5. c. cvi	4 August 1926
An Act to alter the boundaries of the borough of Wolverhampton to empower the mayor aldermen and burgesses of that borough to acquire lands and for other purposes. (Repealed by Wolverhampton Corporation Act 1969 (c. lx))
Perth Corporation Water Order Confirmation Act 1926	16 & 17 Geo. 5. c. cvii	15 December 1926
An Act to confirm a Provisional Order under the Private Legislation Procedure (Scotland) Act 1899 relating to Perth Corporation Water.
	Perth Corporation Water Order 1926 Provisional Order to authorise the construction of additional waterworks for the city and royal burgh of Perth to confer further borrowing powers for the purposes of the water undertaking of the city and for other purposes.	
Stornoway Harbour Order Confirmation Act 1926	16 & 17 Geo. 5. c. cviii	15 December 1926
An Act to confirm a Provisional Order under the Private Legislation Procedure (Scotland) Act 1899 relating to Stornoway Harbour.
	Stornoway Harbour Order 1926 Provisional Order for the incorporation of the Stornoway Pier and Harbour Commission and for the improvement maintenance and management of the pier and harbour of Stornoway in the Island of Lewis and County of Ross and Cromarty and for other purposes.	
Forth and Clyde Navigation (Castlecary and Kirkintilloch Road Bridges) Order Confirmation Act 1926	16 & 17 Geo. 5. c. cix	15 December 1926
An Act to confirm a Provisional Order under the Private Legislation Procedure (Scotland) Act 1899 relating to Forth and Clyde Navigation (Castlecary and Kirkintilloch Road Bridges).
	Forth and Clyde Navigation (Castlecary and Kirkintilloch Road Bridges) Order 1926 Provisional Order to authorise the. County Council of the county of Stirling and the County Council of the county of Lanark to con'struct and maintain bridges over the Forth and Clyde. Navigation at Castlecary and at Easter Cawder near Kirkintilloch respectively and for other purposes.	
Glasgow Goldsmiths Company Order Confirmation Act 1926 (repealed)	16 & 17 Geo. 5. c. cx	15 December 1926
An Act to confirm a Provisional Order under the Private Legislation Procedure (Scotland) Act 1899 relating to the Glasgow Goldsmiths Company. (Repealed by Hallmarking Act 1973 (c. 43))
	Glasgow Goldsmiths Company Order 1926 Provisional Order to confer further powers on the Glasgow Goldsmiths Company in relation to the application of their funds and otherwise.	
Barnet District Gas and Water Act 1926 (repealed)	16 & 17 Geo. 5. c. cxi	15 December 1926
An Act to confer further powers on the Barnet District Gas and Water Company to extend their limits for the supply of water to consolidate and amalgamate their capital and for other purposes. (Repealed by Lee Valley Water Act 1959 (7 & 8 Eliz. 2. c. li))

== See also ==
- List of acts of the Parliament of the United Kingdom
