= Board of Guardians (Default) Act 1926 =

Act of the Parliament of the United Kingdom

Board of Guardians (Default) Act 1926 (Note: Section 2(1).)
- Act of Parliament
- Parliament of the United Kingdom
- Long title: An Act to provide in the case of default by a board of guardians for the reconstitution of the board; and for matters arising out of the default or consequential on the reconstitution.
- Citation: 16 & 17 Geo. 5. c. 20
- Territorial extent: England and Wales; Scotland; (Note: Section 2(2).)

Dates
- Royal assent: 15 July 1926
- Commencement: 15 July 1926 (Note: The Acts of Parliament (Commencement) Act 1793.)
- Repealed: 1 October 1927
Other legislation
Repealed by	Poor Law Act 1927

Status: Repealed

Text of statute as originally enacted

The Board of Guardians (Default) Act 1926 (16 & 17 Geo. 5. c. 20 ) was an act of the Parliament of the United Kingdom passed on 15 July 1926 which allowed the Minister of Health to reconstitute a board of guardians if he considered that the board of guardians was not properly performing its functions. The act allowed for boards of guardians to be replaced by government officials.

== Provisions ==
=== Short title, commencement and extent ===
Section 2(1) of the act provided that the act may be cited as the Board of Guardians (Default) Act 1926.

Section 2(2) of the act provided that the act would not extend to Ireland.

== Subsequent developments ==
The whole act was repealed by section 245(1) of, and the eleventh schedule to, Poor Law Act 1927 (17 & 18 Geo. 5. c. 14), which came into force on 1 October 1927.
