= Port of Inverness =

Coordinates: 57.4864°N 4.2309°W

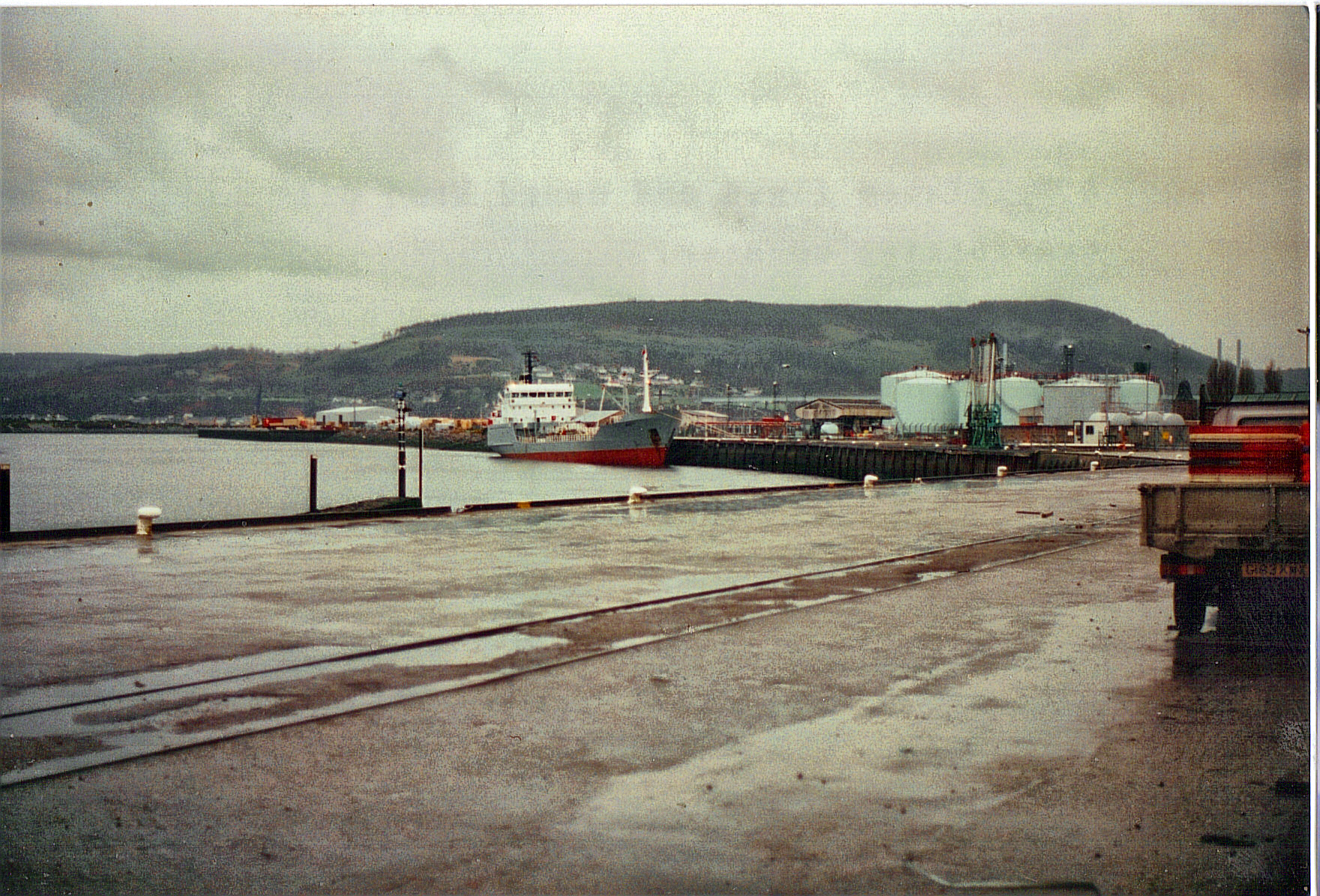
- Inverness Harbour in 1999
- Interactive map of Port of Inverness

Location
- Country: Scotland
- Location: Inverness

Details
- Opened: 1249
- Operated by: Inverness Harbour Trust
- Type of Harbor: Port
- No. of wharfs: 4

Statistics
- Vessel arrivals: 300
- Annual cargo tonnage: 800,000

Inverness Harbour Act 1847
- Act of Parliament
- Parliament of the United Kingdom
- Long title: An Act for deepening, enlarging, improving, and maintaining the Port and Harbour of Inverness, and the Navigation of the River Ness, and the Quays and Piers and other Works connected therewith; for regulating the Anchorage and Shore Dues of the said Port and Harbour; and for other Purposes relating thereto.
- Citation: 10 & 11 Vict. c. ccix

Dates
- Royal assent: 9 July 1847

Text of statute as originally enacted

The Port of Inverness is a port on the east coast of Scotland, at Inverness, Highland council area, at the mouth of the River Ness. It is one of Scotland's most sheltered and deep natural ports. The port is owned and operated by Inverness Harbour Trust, established by the Inverness Harbour Act 1847 (10 & 11 Vict. c. ccix). The port was first recorded in history in 1249.

The port trades with Scandinavia, the EU and the rest of the UK. Goods handled include oil and fuel, turbines for wind energy converters, timber, round logs, board, wood chips, coal, salt, animal feed, frozen fish, fish oil and other goods. Due to recent expansion the port can now handle cargoes of turbine blades of length up to 50 m. There are extensive lay down areas as well as covered storage facilities. The port has easy access to the A9 road and the hinterland of Inverness, the capital of the Scottish Highlands. There is also ready access to the railway system from Inverness station. Recent years have seen cargo close to 800,000 tonnes per annum and over 300 vessels visiting the port.

The port has four main quays: North Longman 150 m in length; Longman 340 m in length; North Citadel 100 m in length and; South Citadel (tanker berth) 150 m in length. Bunkering by road tanker can be provided by prior arrangement. While the Port of Inverness can handle smaller cruise vessels, larger cruise liners tend to go to Invergordon, which is a deep water port about 24 miles from Inverness on the Cromarty Firth and allows docking and disembarkation of passengers without the need of a Ship's tender.

Next to the Port of Inverness is Inverness Marina, which provides berthing for yachts.
