= Kilmarnock Corporation Tramways =

Tramway operator in Scotland

Operation
- Locale: Kilmarnock
- Open: 12 December 1904; 121 years ago
- Close: 3 May 1926; 100 years ago
- Status: Closed

Infrastructure
- Track gauge: 1,435 mm (4 ft 8 1/2 in)
- Propulsion system: Electric
- Depot: Greenholm Street

Statistics
- Route length: 4.24 miles (6.82 km)

Kilmarnock Corporation Tramways operated a tramway service in Kilmarnock between 1904 and 1926.

== History ==
To power the tramway an electric power station was built on the south bank of the River Irvine at Riccarton.

The tram network at its peak went from Ayr Road in Riccarton at its southerly point, to Knockinlaw Road in Beansburn in the north. At Kilmarnock Cross, the line had an easterly spur that stretched along London Road, through Crookedholm and finally terminating at Hurlford.

The depot was located in Greenholm Street (grid reference NS 42645 36604).

Proposed extensions along Portland Road, up John Finnie Street, West Langlands Street and towards Crosshouse were never constructed.

== Closure ==
The trams ceased operation during the UK General Strike of 1926. The council decided not to restart the service and the infrastructure was soon dismantled.
