= Statute Law Revision and Civil Procedure Act 1883 =

Act of the Parliament of the United Kingdom

Statute Law Revision and Civil Procedure Act 1883 (Note: Section 1.)
- Act of Parliament
- Parliament of the United Kingdom
- Long title: An Act for promoting the Revision of the Statute Law by repealing various Enactments relating to Civil Procedure or matters connected therewith, and for amending in some respects the Law relating to Civil Procedure.
- Citation: 46 & 47 Vict. c. 49
- Introduced by: Roundell Palmer, 1st Baron Selborne (Lords)
- Territorial extent: England and Wales (Note: Section 2.)

Dates
- Royal assent: 25 August 1883
- Commencement: 24 October 1883 (Note: Section 2.)
- Repealed: 1 January 1926
Other legislation
Amends	See § Repealed enactments
Repeals/revokes	See § Repealed enactments
Amended by	Statute Law Revision Act 1898
Repealed by	Supreme Court of Judicature (Consolidation) Act 1925
Relates to	Repeal of Obsolete Statutes Act 1856; Statute Law Revision and Civil Procedure Act 1881; See Statute law revision act

Status: Repealed

History of passage through Parliament

Records of Parliamentary debate relating to the statute from Hansard

Text of statute as originally enacted

The Statute Law Revision and Civil Procedure Act 1883 (46 & 47 Vict. c. 49) was an act of the Parliament of the United Kingdom that repealed for England and Wales enactments relating to civil procedure from 1495 to 1867 which had ceased to be in force or had become necessary. The act was intended, in particular, to facilitate the preparation of the revised edition of the statutes, then in progress.

Section 187 of the County Courts Act 1888 (51 & 52 Vict. c. 43) provided that any reference to an inferior court in the act was to be construed as referring to courts under that act as well as to any other inferior court.

Section 209 of the Supreme Court of Judicature (Consolidation) Act 1925 (15 & 16 Geo. 5. c. 49) provided that if and so far as any enactment repealed by this act applied, or might have been applied by Order in Council, to the Court of the County Palatine of Lancaster, or to any inferior court of civil jurisdiction, that enactment was to be construed as if it were contained in a local and personal act specially relating to that court, and was to have effect accordingly.

== Background ==
In the United Kingdom, acts of Parliament remain in force until expressly repealed. Blackstone's Commentaries on the Laws of England, published in the late 18th-century, raised questions about the system and structure of the common law and the poor drafting and disorder of the existing statute book.

In 1806, the Commission on Public Records passed a resolution requesting the production of a report on the best mode of reducing the volume of the statute book. From 1810 to 1825, The Statutes of the Realm was published, providing for the first time the authoritative collection of acts. In 1816, both Houses of Parliament, passed resolutions that an eminent lawyer with 20 clerks be commissioned to make a digest of the statutes, which was declared "very expedient to be done." However, this was never done.

At the start of the parliamentary session in 1853, Lord Cranworth announced his intention to the improvement of the statute law and in March 1853, appointed the Board for the Revision of the Statute Law to repeal expired statutes and continue consolidation, with a wider remit that included civil law. The Board issued three reports, recommending the creation of a permanent body for statute law reform.

In 1854, Lord Cranworth appointed the Royal Commission for Consolidating the Statute Law to consolidate existing statutes and enactments of English law. The Commission made four reports.

An alternative approach, focusing on expunging obsolete laws from the statute book, followed by consolidation, was proposed by Peter Locke King MP, who was heavily critical of the expenditure of the Commission and the lack of results. This approach was taken by the Repeal of Obsolete Statutes Act 1856 (19 & 20 Vict. c. 64), considered to be the first Statute Law Revision Act.

On 17 February 1860, the Attorney General, Sir Richard Bethell told the House of Commons that he had engaged Sir Francis Reilly and A. J. Wood to expurgate the statute book of all acts which, though not expressly repealed, were not in force, working backwards from the present time.

Previous Acts
Year passed	Title	Citation	Effect
1861	Statute Law Revision Act 1861	24 & 25 Vict. c. 101	Repealed or amended over 800 enactments
1863	Statute Law Revision Act 1863	26 & 27 Vict. c. 125	Repealed or amended over 1,600 enactments for England and Wales
1867	Statute Law Revision Act 1867	30 & 31 Vict. c. 59	Repealed or amended over 1,380 enactments
1870	Statute Law Revision Act 1870	33 & 34 Vict. c. 69	Repealed or amended over 250 enactments
1871	Promissory Oaths Act 1871	34 & 35 Vict. c. 48	Repealed or amended almost 200 enactments
1871	Statute Law Revision Act 1871	34 & 35 Vict. c. 116	Repealed or amended over 1,060 enactments
1872	Statute Law Revision Act 1872	35 & 36 Vict. c. 63	Repealed or amended almost 490 enactments
1872	Statute Law (Ireland) Revision Act 1872	35 & 36 Vict. c. 98	Repealed or amended over 1,050 enactments
1872	Statute Law Revision Act 1872 (No. 2)	35 & 36 Vict. c. 97	Repealed or amended almost 260 enactments
1873	Statute Law Revision Act 1873	36 & 37 Vict. c. 91	Repealed or amended 1,225 enactments
1874	Statute Law Revision Act 1874	37 & 38 Vict. c. 35	Repealed or amended over 490 enactments
1874	Statute Law Revision Act 1874 (No. 2)	37 & 38 Vict. c. 96	Repealed or amended almost 470 enactments
1875	Statute Law Revision Act 1875	38 & 39 Vict. c. 66	Repealed or amended over 1,400 enactments
1876	Statute Law Revision (Substituted Enactments) Act 1876	39 & 40 Vict. c. 20	Updated references to repealed acts
1878	Statute Law Revision (Ireland) Act 1878	41 & 42 Vict. c. 57	Repealed or amended over 460 enactments passed by the Parliament of Ireland
1878	Statute Law Revision Act 1878	41 & 42 Vict. c. 79	Repealed or amended over 90 enactments.
1879	Statute Law Revision (Ireland) Act 1879	42 & 43 Vict. c. 24	Repealed or amended over 460 enactments passed by the Parliament of Ireland
1879	Civil Procedure Acts Repeal Act 1879	42 & 43 Vict. c. 59	Repealed or amended over 130 enactments
1881	Statute Law Revision and Civil Procedure Act 1881	44 & 45 Vict. c. 59	Repealed or amended or amended almost 100 enactments relating to civil procedure.
1883	Statute Law Revision Act 1883	46 & 47 Vict. c. 39	Repealed or amended over 475 enactments

== Passage ==
The Statute Law Revision and Civil Procedure Bill had its first reading in the House of Lords on 3 August 1883, introduced by the Lord Chancellor, Roundell Palmer, 1st Baron Selborne. The bill had its second reading in the House of Lords on 7 August 1883 and was committed to a committee of the whole house, which met and reported on 9 August 1883, without amendments. The bill had its third reading in the House of Lords on 13 August 1883 and passed, without amendments.

The bill had its first reading in the House of Commons on 14 August 1883. The bill had its second reading in the House of Commons on 16 August 1883 and was committed to a committee of the whole house, which met and reported on 18 August 1883, with amendments. The amended bill had its third reading in the House of Commons on 18 August 1883and passed, without amendments.

The amended bill was considered and agreed to by the House of Lords on 23 August 1883.

The bill was granted royal assent on 25 August 1883.

== Subsequent developments ==
The repeal of the Court of Chancery (England) Act 1850 (13 & 14 Vict. c. 35) was commented on. While this statute was ostensibly repealed, Order XXXIV, rule 5 of the New Rules specifically preserved its procedural aspects. This created an unusual situation where, despite the formal repeal, the practical effect remained largely unchanged, as the new rule maintained the same procedure for stating special cases as had existed under the original statute.

The repeal of enactments mentioned in part II of the schedule to the Civil Procedure Acts Repeal Act 1879 (42 & 43 Vict. c. 59) by section 4 of the act was criticised for their complexity, specifically where multiple enactments served the same purpose, serving to "incumber the Statute-book". For example, the Supreme Court of Judicature received powers under the Insolvent Debtors Relief (No. 2) Act 1728 (2 Geo. 2. c. 22) and the Set-off Act 1734 (8 Geo. 2. c. 24) that established the right of set-off for mutual debts in legal actions, through the Rules of Court 1875, and the County Court through the County Court Rules in 1876. These acts were affected by the Civil Procedure Repeal Act 1879 (c. 59) and these provisions were further extended to the Court of the County Palatine of Lancaster and other inferior civil courts by section 7 of the act.

There were significant challenges following the passing of the act, leading to several court cases. As to the preamble, see Hanak v Green. As to section 6, see Buckley v Hull Docks. As to the effect of the act on Lord Cairns' Act (21 & 22 Vict. c. 27), see Leeds Industrial Co-operative Society v Slack. In Snelling v. Pulling (Law Times, Jan. 31, 1885), statutes marked as "repealed" remained effectively in force for certain purposes. For example, despite the Civil Procedure Acts Repeal Act 1879 (42 & 43 Vict. c. 59), which was meant to repeal earlier procedural rules, the court determined that some prior legal principles maintained their binding effect. A similar issue arose in Sargant v. Collyer (51 L. T. Rep. N. S. 723), where the Court of Appeal emphasised that despite the formal repeal of Lord Cairns' Act (c. 27) by the act, certain jurisdictional powers were preserved through section 5 of the act. This created confusion particularly regarding the Palatine Court of Lancaster and other local courts.

The preamble, section 2 from "It shall" to the end of the section, section 4, section 5, section 6(a) and section 6(b) and the schedule to the act except the entries as to the Perpetuation of Testimony Act 1842 (5 & 6 Vict. c. 69) and Chancery Amendment Act 1858 (21 & 22 Vict.) c. 27 was repealed by section 1 of, and the schedule to, the Statute Law Revision Act 1898 (61 & 62 Vict. c. 22).

The whole act was repealed by section 226(1) of, and the sixth schedule to the Supreme Court of Judicature (Consolidation) Act 1925 (15 & 16 Geo. 5. c. 49).

== Repealed enactments ==
Section 2 of the act provided that the act did not extend to Scotland or Ireland and would commence on 24 October 1883.

Section 3 of the act repealed 19 enactments, enactments in the schedule to the act, across six categories: (Note: The Note of the bill, unlike the schedule, gives commentary on each act, noting any earlier repeals and the reason for the new repeal.)

- Expired
- Spent
- Repealed in general terms
- Virtually repealed
- Superseded
- Obsolete

Section 4 of the act repealed the enactments mentioned in part II of the schedule to the Civil Procedure Acts Repeal Act 1879 (42 & 43 Vict. c. 59).

Section 5 of the act included several safeguards to ensure that the repeal does not negatively affect existing rights or ongoing legal matters. Specifically, any legal rights, privileges, or remedies already obtained under the repealed laws, as well as any legal proceedings or principles established by them, remain unaffected. Section 5 of the act also ensured that repealed enactments that have been incorporated into other laws would continue to have legal effect in those contexts. This was included to prevent an accidental repeal of a power which ought to be preserved, that Lord Cairn's Act is still in force and that the Court Division can award damages in lieu of injunction.

Section 6 of the act provided that:

- Any repeals would not revive any former rights, offices, or jurisdictions that had already been abolished.
- No enactment repealed by section 33 of the Supreme Court of Judicature Act 1875 (38 & 39 Vict. c. 77) shall be revived by reason of the annulment or alteration by any new Rule of Court of the rules contained in the First Schedule to that Act. This ensured that matters abolished by the Supreme Court of Judicature Act 1875 (38 & 39 Vict. c. 77), including local venues, bills of exception, proceedings in error etc., remained abolished.
- Enactments relating to making of Rules of Court, contained in the Judicature Acts, shall be deemed to extent and apply to the matters contained in and regulated by the enactments repealed by the Act. This ensured that the Rules of Court passed under repealed acts would remain valid and not be ultra vires.

Section 7 of the act provided that repealed enactments shall be construed as if they were contained in a local and personal act relating to the Court of the County Palatine of Lancaster or any inferior court of jurisdiction.

Section 8 of the act provided that the monarch had power by order in council to extend any provisions of the Judicature Acts to inferior courts of civil jurisdiction, in the same manner as provisions under the Common Law Procedure Act 1852 (15 & 16 Vict. c. 76), the Common Law Procedure Act 1854 (17 & 18 Vict. c. 125) and the Common Law Procedure Act 1860 (23 & 24 Vict. c. 126) were extended to any such court.

Citation	Short title	Title	Extent of repeal
11 Hen. 7. c. 12	Suing in Forma Pauperis Act 1495	An Acte to admytt such psons as are poore to sue in forma pauperis.	The whole act. (Note: Repealed for the avoidance of doubt by Statute Law (Repeals) Act 1973 (c. 39). The Chronological Table of the Statutes state "Rep., 46 & 47 Vict. c. 49 s. 3., but see s. 7.")
23 Hen. 8. c. 15	Costs Act 1531	An Acte that the defendant shall recover costs againste the pleyntiff if the pleyntiff be nonsuited, or if the verdict passe againste him.	The whole act.
9 Anne. c. 25	Municipal Offices Act 1710	An Act the title whereof begins with the words "An Act for rendering," and ends with the words "in corporations and boroughs."	In part; section one from the words "For remedy whereof" down to the end of the section. Section two, section three, and section six.
1 Will. 4. c. 21	Prohibition and Mandamus Act 1831	An Act to improve the proceedings in prohibition and on writs of mandamus.	The whole act.
1 Will. 4. c. 22	Evidence on Commission Act 1831	An Act to enable courts of law to order the examination of witnesses upon interrogatories and otherwise.	Section three, section four, section five, section eight, section nine, section ten, section eleven.
1 & 2 Will. 4. c. 58	Interpleader (England) Act 1831	An Act to enable courts of law to give relief against adverse claims made upon persons having no interest in the subject of such claims.	The whole act.
5 & 6 Vict. c. 69	Perpetuation of Testimony Act 1842	An Act for perpetuating testimony in certain cases.	The whole act.
6 & 7 Vict. c. 67	Writs of Mandamus Act 1843	An Act to enable parties to sue out and prosecute writs of error in certain cases upon the proceedings on writs of mandamus.	The whole act.
13 & 14 Vict. c. 35	Court of Chancery (England) Act 1850	An Act to diminish the delay and expense of proceedings in the High Court of Chancery in England.	The whole act.
15 & 16 Vict. c. 76	Common Law Procedure Act 1852	The Common Law Procedure Act, 1852.	The whole Act except sect. 23; sects. 104 to 108; sect. 110; sects. 112 to 115; sect. 126; sect. 127; sect. 132; sects. 208 to 220; sect. 226; sect. 235; and sect. 236.
15 & 16 Vict. c. 80	Master in Chancery Abolition Act 1852	An Act to abolish the office of Master in Ordinary of the High Court of Chancery, and to make provision for the more speedy and efficient despatch of business in the said Court.	Sects. 11 to 15, 26 to 34, 36, 40, 42, 43, 53, 56.
15 & 16 Vict. c. 86	Court of Chancery Procedure Act 1852	An Act to amend the Practice and Course of Proceeding in the High Court of Chancery.	Sects. 3 to 21, sects. 25 to 42, sects. 44 to 47, sects. 49 to 62, sect. 66, and the schedule.
17 & 18 Vict. c. 125	Common Law Procedure Act 1854	The Common Law Procedure Act, 1854.	The whole Act except sects. 3 to 17, sects. 20 to 30, sect. 59, sect. 87, sect. 89, sects. 105, 106, and 107.
18 & 19 Vict. c. 67	Summary Procedure on Bills of Exchange Act 1855	The Summary Procedure on Bills of Exchange Act, 1855.	The whole act.
21 & 22 Vict. c. 27	Chancery Amendment Act 1858	The Chancery Amendment Act, 1858.	The whole act.
23 & 24 Vict. c. 38	Law of Property Amendment Act 1860	An Act to further amend the law of property.	Sect. 14.
23 & 24 Vict. c. 126	Common Law Procedure Act 1860	The Common Law Procedure Act, 1860.	The whole Act, except sect. 1, sect. 17, sect. 22, sects. 45 and 46.
25 & 26 Vict. c. 42	Chancery Regulation Act 1862	The Chancery Regulation Act, 1862.	The whole act.
30 & 31 Vict. c. 64	Court of Appeal in Chancery Act 1867	An Act to make further provision for the despatch of business in the Court of Appeal in Chancery.	The whole act.

== See also ==
- Statute Law Revision Act

== Bibliography ==
- Thomas Snow, Charles Burney and Francis A Stringer. The Annual Practice 1909. Sweet and Maxwell. Stevens and Sons. London. 1909. Volume 1. Pages ccxciii, 7, 52, 159, 198, 459, 463, 469, 515, 520, 526, 528, 540, 617, 642, 647, 650 to 653, 668, 669, 709, 712 and 803. Volume 2. Pages 530, 560, 588, 587 and 1005.
- Powell. Roscoe's Digest of the Law of Evidence. Sixteenth Edition. 1891. Volume 1. Pages 9, 228, 310, 716, 732, 880, 990, 991, 998, 999.
