= Chancery Regulation Act 1862 =

Act of the Parliament of the United Kingdom

Chancery Regulation Act 1862 (Note: Section 6.)
- Act of Parliament
- Parliament of the United Kingdom
- Long title: An Act to regulate the Procedure in the High Court of Chancery and the Court of Chancery of the County Palatine of Lancaster.
- Citation: 25 & 26 Vict. c. 42
- Introduced by: Sir John Rolt, Attorney General (Commons)
- Territorial extent: England and Wales (Note: Preamble.)

Dates
- Royal assent: 17 July 1862
- Commencement: 1 November 1862
- Repealed: 24 October 1883
Other legislation
Amended by	Statute Law Revision and Civil Procedure Act 1881
Repealed by	Statute Law Revision and Civil Procedure Act 1883
Relates to	Judicature Acts

Status: Repealed

Text of statute as originally enacted

The Chancery Regulation Act 1862 (25 & 26 Vict. c. 42), also known as Rolt's Act, was an act of the Parliament of the United Kingdom that was an important step in the fusion of law and equity.

== Background ==
From the 13th century in England and Wales, equity developed as a system of justice in parallel with and complementary to the common law. By the 19th century, with the rise of capitalism in Victorian Britain, equity had become very important. The remedies available to the common law were limited to damages and those disputes demanding an injunction or specific performance of a contract needed to be heard in equity which was administered in Courts of Chancery, separate from the common law courts. Moreover, procedure in equity was better able to handle complex disputes involving the relationship between several parties such as partnerships and trusts.

However, the dual jurisdiction of law and equity caused problems for litigants. In equity, all parties had to be represented at all hearings and if one died or married complex procedures were needed to maintain the action. The rate of progress of the action was in the hands of the parties and would tend to be determined by the slowest. Many uncontroversial administrative actions, such as appointing a new trustee, were dealt with as though they were contentious, adding further delay. There were many inefficiencies in procedure with high costs and a certain amount of corruption. Further, cases that involved questions of both law and equity would be hampered, shuttling between the courts of Chancery and common law courts for years, as in Wood v. Scarth.

The Chancery commission (1824–26) made recommendations on streamlining procedure but the commissioners concluded that the Chancery courts themselves had the powers to improve matters. Over the following decades there was much debate leading to legislation including the Improvement of the Jurisdiction of Equity Act 1852 which allowed Chancery judges to decide questions of fact rather than remitting them to the common law courts. However, by 1862, Chancery judges were still reluctant to make use of these powers so the MP Sir John Rolt introduced a bill to make determination of facts by Chancery judges mandatory.

== Provisions ==
The purpose of the act was to require the Court of Chancery to determine every issue of fact or law necessary for the final resolution of the case, and thus to end the practice of sending particular issues in cases pending in Chancery, to be determined in the common law courts. In the end, the Act was weakened from its initial intentions, allowing matters of fact to referred by a Chancery Judge to be decided by the assizes.

The act applied to the High Court of Chancery of England and Wales and also to the Court of Chancery of the County Palatine of Lancaster which had an independent jurisdiction in equity. A further act, the Chancery Regulation (Ireland) Act 1862 (25 & 26 Vict. c. 46), brought a similar reform to Ireland.

== Subsequent developments ==
The fusion of the administration of law and equity was finally effected in the 1870s by the Judicature Acts.

The whole act was repealed by section 1 of, and the schedule to, the Statute Law Revision and Civil Procedure Act 1883 (46 & 47 Vict. c. 49), which came into force on 24 October 1883.

== Bibliography ==
- Hansard, HC Deb 26 March 1862 vol 166 cc114-22 114
- Lobban, M. (2004a). "Preparing for Fusion: Reforming the Nineteenth-Century Court of Chancery, Part I". Law and History Review. University of Illinois. Archived from the original on 9 July 2008.
- Lobban, M. (2004b). "Preparing for Fusion: Reforming the Nineteenth-Century Court of Chancery, Part II". Law and History Review. University of Illinois. Archived from the original on 19 September 2008.
