= Doctors' Commons =

Society of lawyers practising civil law in London c. 1511–1865

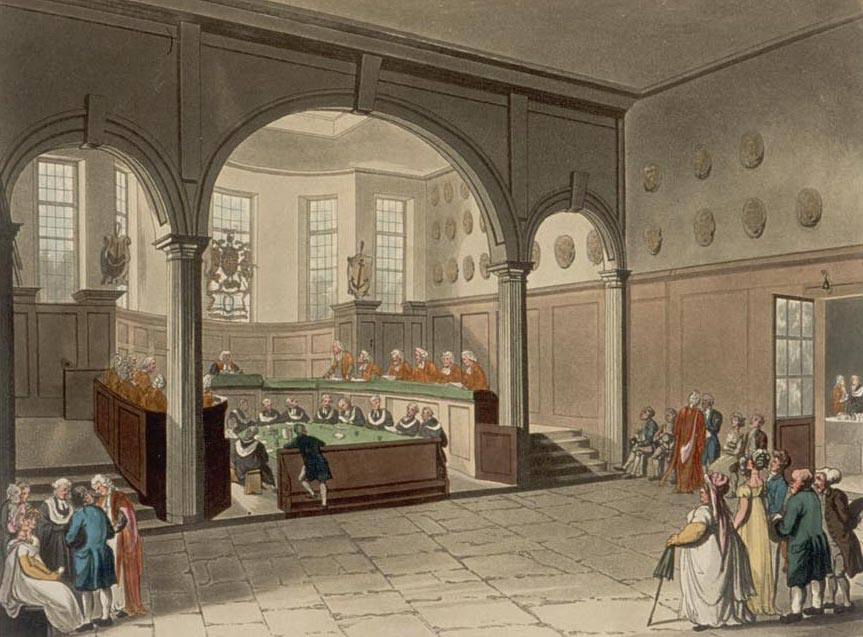
Doctors' Commons in the early 19th century

Doctors' Commons, also called the College of Civilians, was a society of lawyers practising civil (as opposed to common) law in London, namely ecclesiastical and admiralty law. Like the Inns of Court of the common lawyers, the society had buildings with rooms where its members lived and worked, and a large library.

It was also a lower venue for determinations and hearings, short of the society's convening in the Court of the Arches or Admiralty Court, which frequently consisted of judges with other responsibilities and from which further appeal lay. The society used St Benet's, Paul's Wharf as its church.

== The civil law in England ==
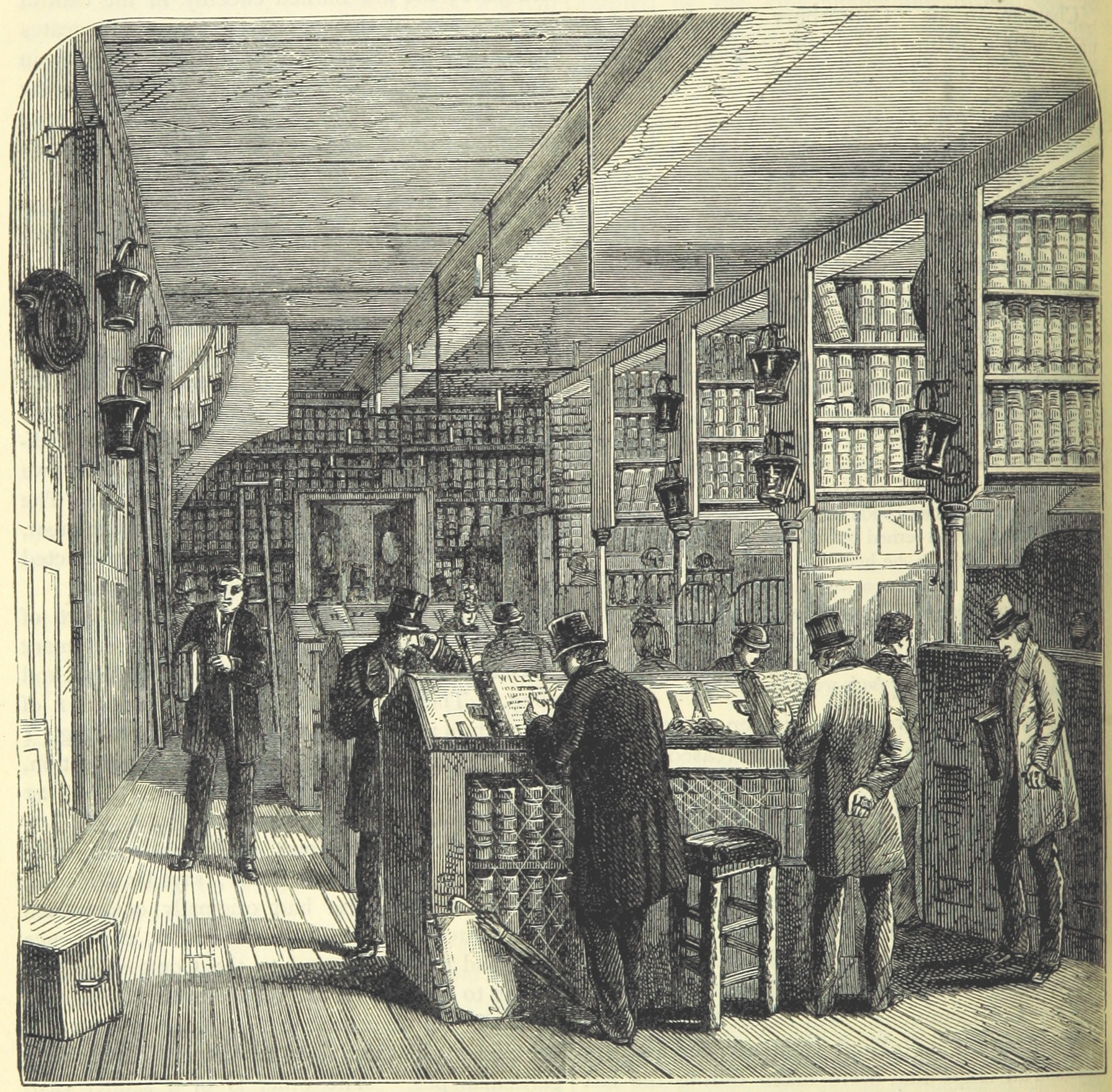
The Prerogative Office, Doctors' Commons, in 1860

While the English common law, unlike the legal systems on the European continent, developed mostly independently from Roman law, some specialised English courts applied the Roman-based civil law. This is true of the ecclesiastical courts, whose practice even after the English Reformation continued to be based on the canon law of the Roman Catholic Church, and also of the admiralty courts. Until reforms in the 19th century, the ecclesiastical courts performed functions equivalent to today's probate courts, subject then to appeals to separate courts (of equity), and family courts (however divorce was much harder to achieve).

The advocates practising in these courts had been trained in canon law (before the Reformation) and in Roman law (after) at the university colleges of Oxford and Cambridge. This profession was split, like its common law counterpart. The advocates (the doctors) were akin to barristers in the common-law courts, while the proctors were akin to attorneys in the common-law courts or to solicitors in the courts of equity.

According to some accounts, the society of Doctors' Commons was formed in 1511 by Richard Blodwell, Dean of the Arches. He served nine years. According to others, it existed in the previous century. The society's buildings, acquired in 1567, were near St. Paul's Cathedral at Paternoster Row, and remained in use for many years; however, in the society's final decades nearby buildings in Knightrider Street were used instead.

In 1768 the society was incorporated. It took official name of the "College of Doctors of Law exercent in the Ecclesiastical and Admiralty Courts". The college still consisted of its president (the Dean of Arches) and of those doctors of law who, having regularly taken that degree in the universities of Oxford or Cambridge, and having been admitted advocates in pursuance of the rescript of the archbishop of Canterbury, were elected "fellows" in the manner prescribed by the charter. There were also attached to the college thirty-four "proctors", whose duties were analogous to those of solicitors.

== Disestablishment ==
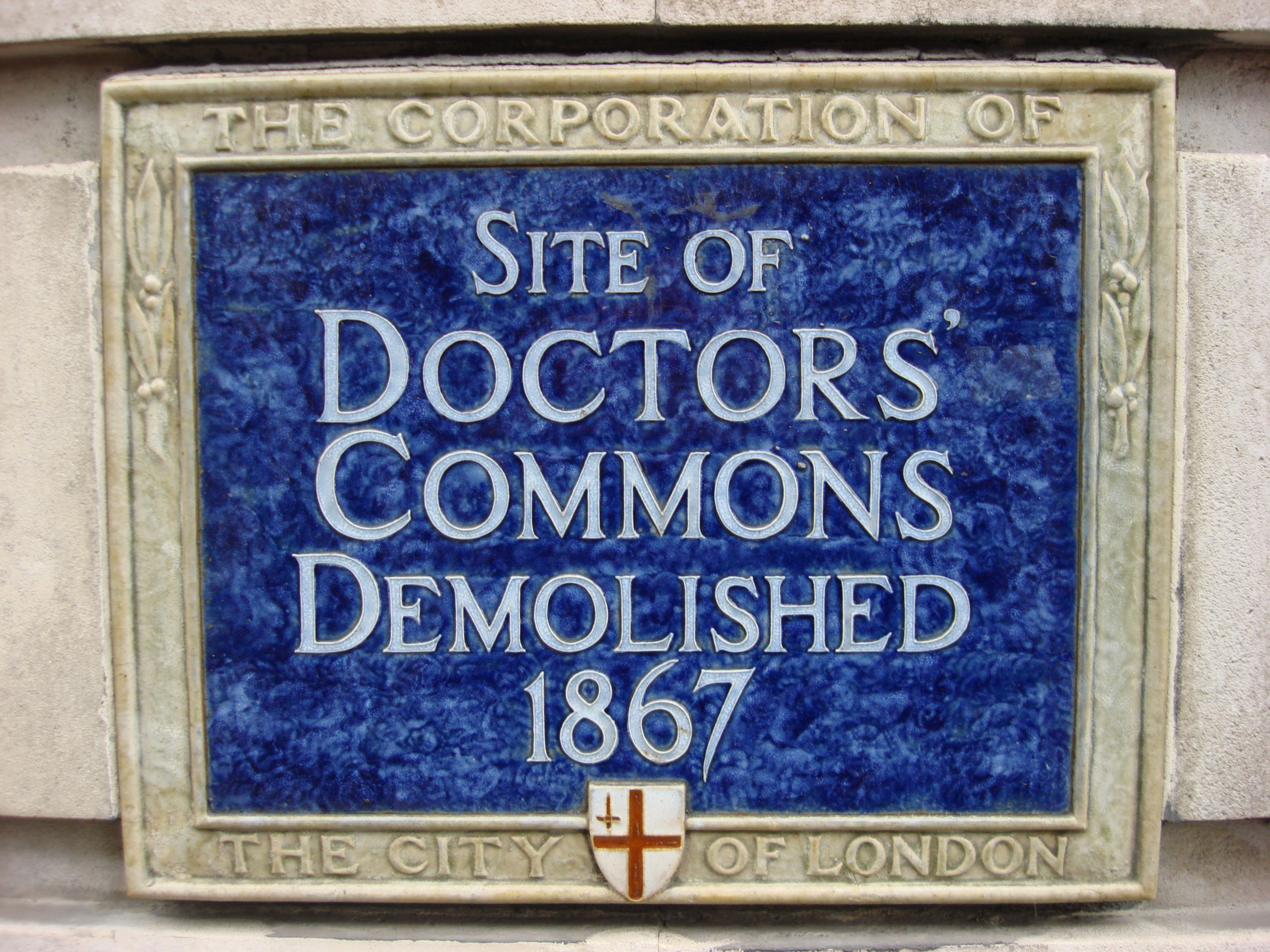
This plaque on the Faraday Building on the north side of Queen Victoria Street marks the site of the now demolished Doctors' Commons.

In the nineteenth century, Doctors' Commons and its members were looked upon as old-fashioned and slightly ridiculous. As anticipation of an impending abolition grew, a reluctance among the members to admit new fellows increased, for this would dilute the proceeds of any winding up of the society's property. Dr Thomas Hutchinson Tristram was the last to be admitted.

The Court of Probate Act 1857 abolished the testamentary jurisdiction of the ecclesiastical courts and gave common lawyers the right to practise in fields which before had been the exclusive domain of civilians (doctors and proctors), while offering in practice scant compensation of the reverse also being permitted. Critically, the Act also made it lawful for the Doctors' Commons, by a vote of the majority of its fellows, to dissolve itself and surrender its Royal Charter, the proceeds of dissolution to be shared among the members.

The Matrimonial Causes Act 1857 created a new divorce court in which regular barristers or doctors of Doctors' Commons could appear.

The High Court of Admiralty Act 1859 liberalised rights of audience in the Admiralty Court. What remained for Doctors' Commons was only the established church's Court of Arches.

A motion to dissolve the society was entered on 13 January 1858, setting the path towards its final meeting: the end of Trinity Term, 10 July 1865. The fellows, rather than surrender their offices and charter, resolved that its property was to be sold and no appointments to any vacant post could be made. The buildings of Doctors' Commons were sold in 1865 and demolished soon after. The site is now largely occupied by the Faraday Building.

The Court of Arches gave right of audience to barristers in 1867.

The society perished with the death of its last fellow, Tristram, in 1912.

== In Victorian literature ==
Satirical descriptions of Doctors' Commons can be found in Charles Dickens's Sketches by Boz and in David Copperfield in which Dickens called it a "cosey, dosey, old-fashioned, time-forgotten, sleepy-headed little family party."

In the same-era novel The Moonstone by Wilkie Collins, the solicitor of Gray's Inn Square Mathew Bruff notes, "I shall perhaps do well if I explain in this place, for the benefit of the few people who don't know it already, that the law allows all wills to be examined at Doctor's Commons by anybody who applies, on payment of a shilling fee."

Doctors' Commons is mentioned anachronistically in the much later short story The Adventure of the Speckled Band by Sir Arthur Conan Doyle, in which Sherlock Holmes apparently obtains some information there about the will of the wife of Dr Grimesby Roylott of Stoke Moran.

== See also ==
- List of demolished buildings and structures in London

== Bibliography ==
- Baker, J.H. (1990). An Introduction to English Legal History. London: Butterworths. ISBN 0-406-53101-3.
- Baker, J.H. (1998). Monuments of Endlesse Labours: English Canonists and Their Work 1300–1900. London: Hambledon Press. ISBN 1-85285-167-8.
- Chisholm, Hugh, ed. (1911). "Doctors' Commons". Encyclopædia Britannica. Vol. 8 (11th ed.). Cambridge University Press. p. 367.
- Collins, Wilkie (1998) [1868]. Kemp, Sandra (ed.). The Moonstone. London: Penguin Books. ISBN 9780140434088.
- Godfrey, Walter H., ed. (1931). London Topographical Record Illustrated. Vol. XV. London: London Topographical Society. p. 4–86.
- Outhwaite, R.B.; Helmholz, R. H. (2007). The Rise and Fall of the English Ecclesiastical Courts, 1500-1860 ((Cambridge Studies in English Legal History) ed.). London: Cambridge University Press. ISBN 978-0-521-86938-6.
- Squibb, G. D. (1977). Doctors' Commons. Oxford: University Press. ISBN 0-19-825339-7.
