= High Court of Admiralty Act 1859 =

Act of the Parliament of the United Kingdom

- Act of Parliament
- Parliament of the United Kingdom
- Long title: An act to enable Serjeants, Barristers-at-law, Attorneys and Solicitors to practice in the High Court of Admiralty.
- Citation: 22 & 23 Vict. c. 6
- Territorial extent: United Kingdom

Dates
- Royal assent: 8 August 1859
- Commencement: 8 August 1859 (Note: Section 1.)
- Repealed: 27 August 1881
Other legislation
Repealed by	Statute Law Revision and Civil Procedure Act 1881

Status: Repealed

Text of statute as originally enacted

The High Court of Admiralty Act 1859 (22 & 23 Vict. c. 6) was an act of the Parliament of the United Kingdom. The act was an important step in moving the ancient Admiralty Court of England and Wales towards its modern constitution. It was also an important step in the abolition of Doctors' Commons.

== Background ==
English Admiralty law is based not on the common law but on civil law, though with some common law and statutory developments. As such, it was historically administered, not by the practitioners in the common law courts but by the practitioners in the ecclesiastical courts, who were organised in the Doctors' Commons and called "advocates" and "proctors," rather than barristers and solicitors. This demarcation was widely held to be restrictive and by the middle of the nineteenth century there was pressure for reform, culminating in the Court of Probate Act 1857 (20 & 21 Vict. c. 77) which started the process of abolition of Doctors' Commons which was completed in 1865.

== Provisions ==
The act received its royal assent on 8 August 1859.

The long title of the act was:

An act to enable Serjeants, Barristers-at-law, Attorneys and Solicitors to practice in the High Court of Admiralty.

By allowing the common lawyers to practise in the Admiralty court, the civil lawyers were deprived of one of their few remaining privileges, thus hastening the demise of their separate constitution.

== Subsequent evelopments ==
The whole act was repealed by section 1 of, and the schedule to, the Statute Law Revision and Civil Procedure Act 1881 (44 & 45 Vict. c. 59), which came into force on 27 August 1881.

== Bibliography ==
- Chisholm, Hugh, ed. (1911). "Admiralty, High Court of" . Encyclopædia Britannica. Vol. 1 (11th ed.). Cambridge University Press. p. 203.
- Squibb, G. D. (1977). Doctors' Commons. Oxford: Oxford University Press. ISBN 0-19-825339-7.
