= Chancery Amendment Act 1858 =

Act of the Parliament of the United Kingdom

Chancery Amendment Act 1858 (Note: Section 1.)
- Act of Parliament
- Parliament of the United Kingdom
- Long title: An Act to amend the course of procedure in the High Court of Chancery, the Court of Chancery in Ireland, and the Court of Chancery of the county palatine of Lancaster.
- Citation: 21 & 22 Vict. c. 27
- Introduced by: Hugh Cairns (Lords)
- Territorial extent: United Kingdom

Dates
- Royal assent: 28 June 1858
- Commencement: 1 October 1858
- Repealed: England and Wales: 24 October 1883; Northern Ireland: 18 April 1979 (Note: The Judicature (Northern Ireland) Act 1978 (Commencement No. 4) Order 1979 (SI 1979/422).); Scotland: 1 January 1982
Other legislation
Amended by	Supreme Court of Judicature (Officers) Act 1879; Statute Law Revision and Civil Procedure Act 1881
Repealed by	England and Wales: Statute Law Revision and Civil Procedure Act 1883; Northern Ireland: Judicature (Northern Ireland) Act 1978; Scotland: Supreme Court Act 1981 (United Kingdom)

Status: Repealed

Text of statute as originally enacted

The Chancery Amendment Act 1858 (21 & 22 Vict. c. 27) also known as Lord Cairns' Act after Sir Hugh Cairns, was an act of the Parliament of the United Kingdom that allowed the English Court of Chancery, the Irish Chancery and the Chancery Court of the County Palatine of Lancaster to award damages, in addition to their previous function of awarding injunctions and specific performance. The act also made several procedural changes to the Chancery courts, most notably allowing them to call a jury, and allowed the Lord Chancellor to amend the practice regulations of the courts. By allowing the Chancery courts to award damages it narrowed the gap between the common law and equity courts and accelerated the passing of the Judicature Act 1873, and for that reason has been described by Ernest Pollock as "prophetic".

After the English Court of Chancery was dissolved by the Supreme Court of Judicature Act 1873 (36 & 37 Vict. c. 66) the act lost relevance, and in England and Wales it was gradually repealed by a succession of acts up to the 1880s. The Supreme Court of Judicature (Ireland) Act 1877, which reorganised the Superior Courts in Ireland to create the High Court of Justice and the Court of Appeal, similarly reduced the relevance of the act in the Republic of Ireland.

== Background ==
During the 19th century the higher courts were divided into two main types—courts of Common Law, such as the Court of Common Pleas, and Courts of Equity such as the Court of Chancery; this reflected the two English court systems which had existed since the Middle Ages. Rules on court jurisdiction meant that common law courts could not grant orders of specific performance or injunctions, only damages, and courts of equity could only grant injunctions and orders of specific performance, not damages. This meant that a winning party in a chancery case who sought to claim damages was forced to open a second claim in a common law court, filling the courts with unnecessary cases and causing additional expense for the parties. The same was true of winners of common law cases who sought specific performance or injunctions. The common law courts were authorised to issue injunctions and orders of specific performance by the Common Law Procedure Act 1854 (17 & 18 Vict. c. 125), but nothing in the act mentioned the Chancery courts.

A Royal Commission "appointed to inquire into the Process, Practice and System of Pleading in the Court of Chancery" had been created in 1850 to investigate possible reforms to the Courts of Chancery, and they recommended (among other things) that the chancery courts be given the power to order damages and use a jury.

The act to implement the Commission's recommendations was introduced in 1857 as "Chancery amendment. A bill to amend the course of procedure in the High Court of Chancery, the Court of Chancery in Ireland, and the Court of Chancery of the county palatine of Lancaster", and after passing through several committees was introduced to the House of Commons on 14 May 1858. The act was piloted through Parliament by Sir Hugh Cairns (later Lord Cairns), the Solicitor General for England and Wales, and for this reason is commonly known as Lord Cairns' Act. It was passed by Parliament and came into force on 1 November 1858.

== Provisions ==
The act is relatively small, containing only 12 sections, including several sections on procedures.

- Section 2 of the act was the most central one, allowing the Courts of Chancery to award damages "in all cases in which [they] have jurisdiction to entertain an application for an injunction.. or specific performance". Although this section was repealed by later Acts, the general principles it set out are still valid law and are found in Section 50 of the Senior Courts Act 1981.
- Section 3 of the act introduced the right of the Chancery judges to call a jury to assess the amount of damages to be awarded and "any question of fact arising in a suit or proceeding". These juries were to consist of the same type of person and be due the same rights as any jury in a common or criminal law case, and the judge was allowed to impose on them any rules permissible in a common or criminal trial. Historically Chancery judges were loath to call juries, but the right existed for them to do so anyway.
- Section 4 gave the Chancery courts the same rights (in awarding damages and calling damages) as any other superior court allowed to do so.
- Section 5 reserved the right of the court to conduct a trial without a jury,
- Section 6 allowed the court to order a jury to assess damages in any other common law court, on assize or in front of a high sheriff.
- Section 7 allowed the court to order any party to provide all evidence to the other party without exception, with any party who refused to do so paying costs to the other side unless the judge said the refusal was reasonable.
- Section 8 extended the act to the Irish Chancery.
- Section 9 allowed the Lord Chancellor to amend the Irish Chancery practice regulations.
- Section 10 extended the act to the Court of Chancery and the Chancery Court of the County Palatine of Lancaster.
- Section 11 allowed the Lord Chancellor to amend practice regulations of these courts.
- Section 12 Stated that these amendments were to be placed before Parliament, and would come into force within 36 days.

== Subsequent developments ==
After the Supreme Court of Judicature Act 1873 dissolved the English Court of Chancery and unified the common and equity courts into the High Court of Justice, the 1858 act became irrelevant since the ability to issue injunctions, order specific performance or award damages was given to all of the senior courts. In the United Kingdom the act was repealed piecemeal by multiple acts, including the Supreme Court of Judicature (Officers) Act 1879 (42 & 43 Vict. c. 78) and the Statute Law Revision and Civil Procedure Act 1881 (44 & 45 Vict. c. 59). The act was formally repealed in its entirety by the Statute Law Revision and Civil Procedure Act 1883 (46 & 47 Vict. c. 49).

Although the act applied to the Irish courts, they were unaffected by any of the repealing legislation. As a result, the provisions of the act are still law in the Republic of Ireland, although they have been transferred several times. The Irish Chancery was merged into the High Court of Ireland by the Supreme Court of Judicature Act (Ireland) 1877 (40 & 41 Vict. c. 57), but the same act also transferred the rights under the 1858 act to the new High Court. The Government of Ireland Act 1920 (10 & 11 Geo. 5. c. 67) transferred these rights to the new Supreme Courts of Northern Ireland and Southern Ireland respectively, and the Judicature (Northern Ireland) Act 1978 finally repealed the act in Northern Ireland. The act is still valid in the Republic of Ireland, however, and the rights continue to be exercised by the High Court of Ireland.

The whole act was repealed for Northern Ireland by section 122(2) of, and part I of schedule 7 to, the Judicature (Northern Ireland) Act 1978, which came into force on 18 April 1979.

The whole act was repealed for the United Kingdom by section 152(4) of, and schedule 7 to, the Senior Courts Act 1981, which came into force on 1 January 1982.

In many British Dominions, local statutes were passed to bring the 1858 Act into local law, and it is still valid in Ontario under the Courts of Justice Act 1984 and British Columbia under the Supreme Court Act 1986.

The act was influential as the first step towards a unified High Court, with equal abilities for both equity and common law branches. Evidence suggests that the changes were easily absorbed by the Court, and there are no cases which suggest it caused problems either in cases or in Parliament.

== Bibliography ==
Primary Sources

- Parliament of the United Kingdom (1858). Chancery Amendment Act 1858.

Secondary Sources

- Jolowicz, J.A. (1975). "Damages in Equity. A Study of Lord Cairns' Act". The Cambridge Law Journal. 34 (2). Cambridge University Press: 224–252. doi:10.1017/S0008197300086104. ISSN 0008-1973. S2CID 146389095.
- McDermott, Peter M. (October 1987). "Survival of jurisdiction under the Chancery Amendment Act 1858 (Lord Cairn's Act)". Civil Justice Quarterly. Sweet & Maxwell. ISSN 0261-9261.
- Ramjohn, Mohamed (1998). Sourcebook On Trusts Law. Routledge. ISBN 1-85941-186-X.
- Sharma, S. (2003). Encyclopaedia of Jurisprudence. Anmol Publications. ISBN 81-261-1474-6.
