= Municipal Offices Act 1710 =

Act of the Parliament of Great Britain

Municipal Offices Act 1710 (Note: The citation of this act by this short title was authorised by section 1 of, and the first schedule to, the Short Titles Act 1896. Due to the repeal of those provisions it is now authorised by section 19(2) of the Interpretation Act 1978.)
- Act of Parliament
- Parliament of Great Britain
- Long title: An Act for rendering the Proceedings upon Writs of Mandamus and Informations in the Nature of a Quo warranto more speedy and effectual, and for the more easy trying and determining the Rights of Offices and Franchises in Corporations and Boroughs.
- Citation: 9 Ann. c. 25 (Note: This is the citation in The Statutes of the Realm); 9 Ann. c. 20 (Note: This is the citation in The Statutes at Large)
- Territorial extent: Great Britain

Dates
- Royal assent: 16 May 1711
- Commencement: Trinity Term 1711 (Note: Section 1.)
- Repealed: 1 January 1940
Other legislation
| Amended by | Parliamentary Elections Act 1840; Statute Law Revision and Civil Procedure Act 1881; Statute Law Revision and Civil Procedure Act 1883; Statute Law Revision Act 1888; Local Government Act 1933; London Government Act 1939 |
| Repealed by | London Government Act 1939 |

Status: Repealed

Text of statute as originally enacted

The Municipal Offices Act 1710 (9 Ann. c. 25) was an act of the Parliament of Great Britain.

== Repeal ==
The act was partly repealed by section 1 of the Parliamentary Elections Act 1840 (3 & 4 Vict. c. 47).

Section 1, from the words "For remedy whereof" down to the end of the section, and sections 2, 3, 6 and 7, of the act were repealed by section 3 of, and the schedule to, the Statute Law Revision and Civil Procedure Act 1883 (46 & 47 Vict. c. 49).

Sections 4 and 5 of the act were repealed by section 84(6) of the Local Government Act 1933 (23 & 24 Geo. 5. c. 51). This repeal did not extend to Scotland, Northern Ireland or London (s. 308(2)).

The whole act, so far as unrepealed, was repealed for England and Wales (except London) by section 307(1)(b) of, and part IV of schedule 11 to, the Local Government Act 1933 (23 & 24 Geo. 5. c. 51).

The whole act, except so far as it related to the City of London, ceased to have effect by virtue of section 205 of, and schedule 7 to, the London Government Act 1939 (2 & 3 Geo. 6. c. 40).

The whole act, except so far as it related to the City of London, was repealed in its application to the administrative county of London by section 207(1) of, and schedule 8 to, the London Government Act 1939 (2 & 3 Geo. 6. c. 40).
