= Court of Chancery =

Court of equity in England and Wales (c. 1350–1875)

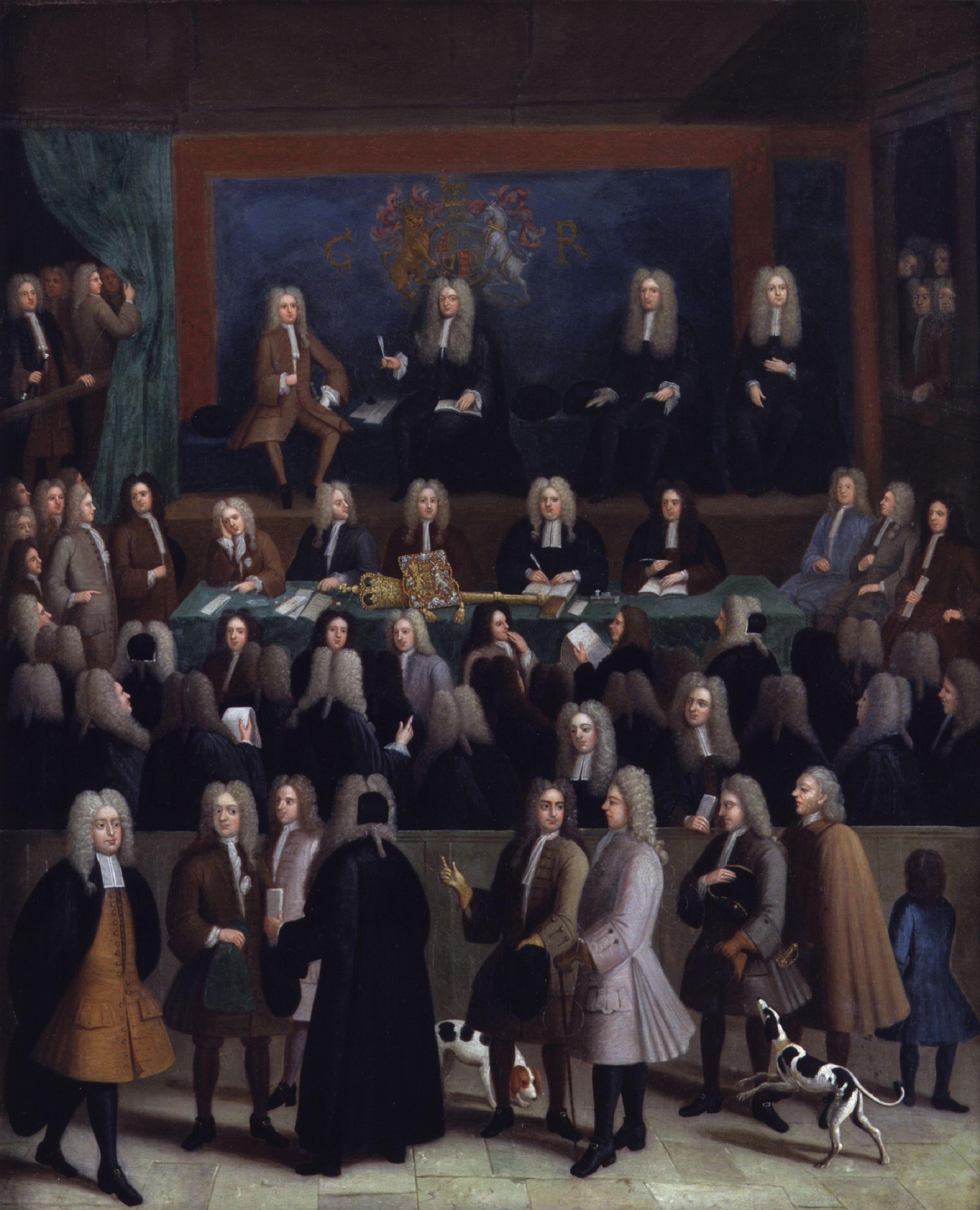
c. 1725 painting of the Court of Chancery

The Court of Chancery was a court of equity in England and Wales that followed a set of loose rules to avoid a slow pace of change and possible harshness (or "inequity") of the common law. The Chancery had jurisdiction over all matters of equity, including trusts, land law, the estates of lunatics and the guardianship of infants. Its initial role differed somewhat: as an extension of the lord chancellor's role as Keeper of the King's Conscience, the court was an administrative body primarily concerned with conscientious law. Thus the Court of Chancery had a far greater remit than the common-law courts (whose decisions it had the jurisdiction to overrule for much of its existence) and was far more flexible.

Until the 19th century, the Court of Chancery could apply a far wider range of remedies than common law courts, such as specific performance and injunctions, and had some power to grant damages in special circumstances. With the shift of the Exchequer of Pleas towards a common law court and loss of its equitable jurisdiction by the Administration of Justice Act 1841, the Chancery became the only national equitable body in the English legal system. Scholars estimate that the Court of Chancery formally split from and became independent of the curia regis in the mid-14th century, at which time it consisted of the lord chancellor and his personal staff, the Chancery.

Initially an administrative body with some judicial duties, the Chancery experienced an explosive growth in its work during the 15th century, particularly under the House of York (r. 1461–1485); academics attribute this to its becoming an almost entirely judicial body. From the time of Queen Elizabeth I (r. 1558–1603) onwards the Court was severely criticised for its slow pace, large backlogs, and high costs. Those problems persisted until its dissolution, despite being mitigated somewhat by reforms, particularly during the 19th century. Attempts at fusing the Chancery with the common law courts began in the 1850s, and finally succeeded with the Supreme Court of Judicature Act 1873 and the Supreme Court of Judicature Act 1875, which dissolved the Chancery and created a new unified High Court of Justice, with the Chancery Division – one of five divisions of the High Court – succeeding the Court of Chancery as an equitable body.

For much of its existence the court was formally led by the lord chancellor, assisted by the judges of the common-law courts. The staff of the court included a large number of clerks, led by the master of the rolls, who regularly heard cases on his own. In 1813 a vice-chancellor was appointed to deal with the Chancery's increasing backlogs, and two more vice-chancellors were appointed in 1841. Lord chancellors sold offices of the Chancery for much of its history, raising large amounts of money. Many of the clerks and other officials held sinecures; the holders, in lieu of wages, charged increasingly exorbitant fees to process cases – one of the main reasons for the high cost of bringing a case to the Court of Chancery. The 19th century saw the abolition of many sinecure offices and the institution of a wage and pension for the lord chancellor to curb the sale of offices; and in 1833 the right to appoint officials was transferred from the chancellor to the Crown.

== History ==
=== Origins ===
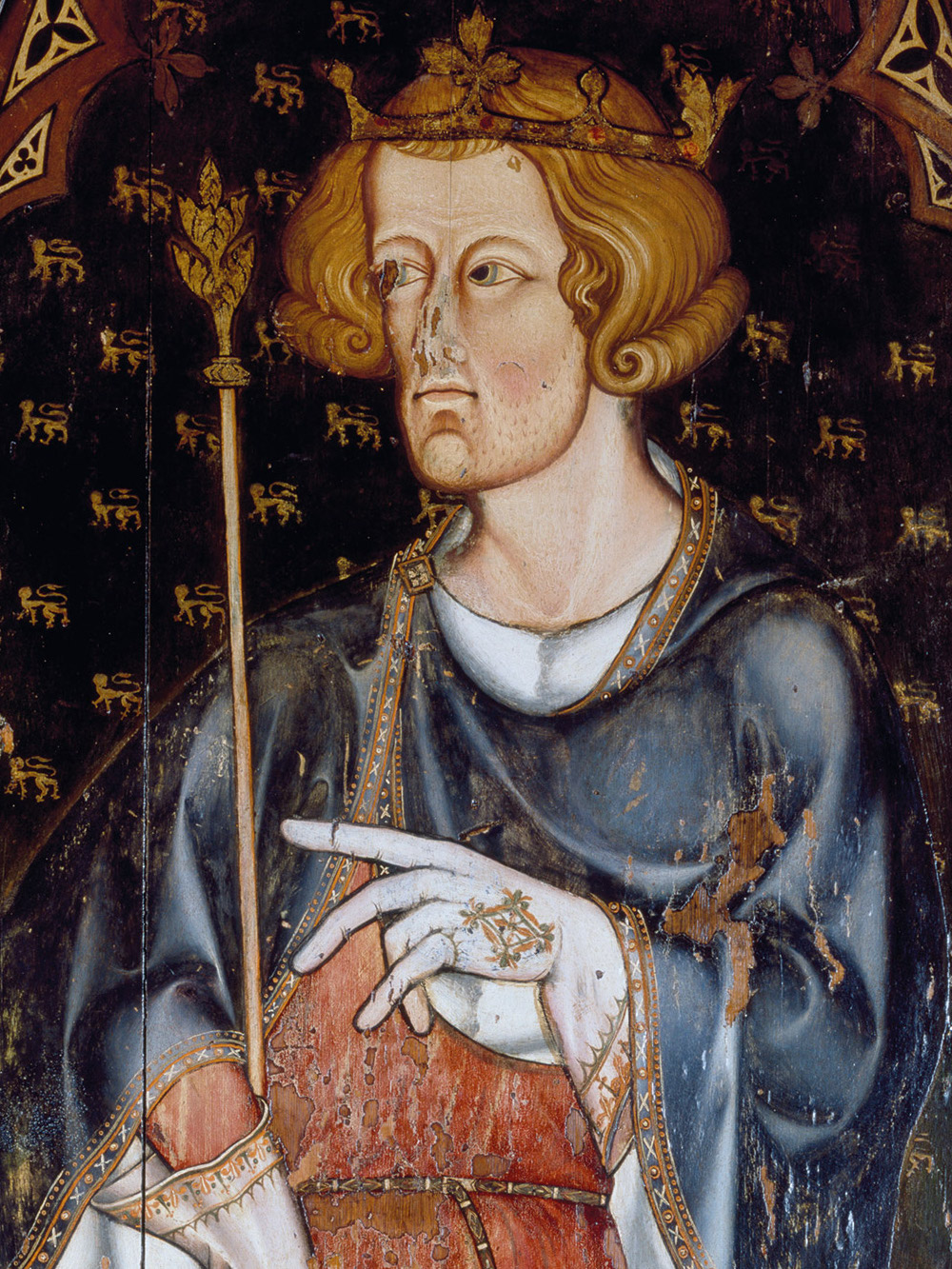
The English king Edward I, during whose reign the chancellor's jurisdiction was established

The Court of Chancery originated, as did the other high courts before 1875, in the Norman curia regis or King's Council, maintained by most early rulers of England after 1066. Under the feudal system, the council was made up of the monarch, the Great Officers of the Crown and anyone else the monarch allowed to attend. Its jurisdiction was virtually unlimited, with executive, judicial and legislative functions. This large body contained lawyers, peers, and members of the church, many of whom lived far from London. It soon became apparent that it was too unwieldy to deal with the nation's day-to-day business. As a result, a smaller curia was formed to deal with the regular business of the country, and this soon split into various courts: first the exchequer of pleas, to deal with finance, and then the Court of Common Pleas, to deal with "common" cases.

The Chancery started as the personal staff of the lord chancellor, described as "a great secretarial bureau, a home office, a foreign office, and a ministry of justice". The earliest reference to legal issues being sent to him is from 1280, when Edward I of England, annoyed with the number of cases coming to him which could have been dealt with by other elements of his administration, passed a statute saying that:

all petitions which touch the Seal shall come first to the chancellor; and those which touch the Exchequer, to the exchequer, and those which touch the justices, or the law of the land, to the justices; and those which touch the Jews, to the justices of the Jews. And if the affairs are so great, or if they are of grace, that the chancellor and the others cannot do it without the king, then they shall bring them with their own hands to the king to know his pleasure; so that no petitions shall come before the king, and his Council, but by the hands of his said chancellor, and the other chief ministers; so that the king and his Council may, without the load of other business, attend to the great business of his realm, and of other foreign countries.

Records show dozens of early cases being sent to the lord chancellor and master of the rolls, but at the time the chancellor had no specific jurisdiction to deal with them; the cases were referred to him only as a matter of convenience. Under Edward II the chancellor dedicated set days to hearing pleas, as documented in the records of the Parliament of Lincoln in 1315, which also show that some cases were heard by his personal staff, the Chancery, and not by the chancellor. By 1320 requests were regularly sent there, and heard by the judges of the common law courts, with the rules used to settle cases being those of "law or reason", sometimes simply "reason", a far more liberal and adjustable approach than the common law.

=== Rise and early years ===
The Chancery came to prominence after the decline of the Exchequer, dealing with the law of equity, something more fluid and adaptable than the common law. The early Court of Chancery dealt with verbal contracts, matters of land law and matters of trusts, and had a very liberal view when setting aside complaints; poverty, for example, was an acceptable reason to cancel a contract or obligation. Complaints were normally brought via a bill or petition, which had to show that the common law did not provide a remedy for the problem. The Chancery writs were in French, and later English, rather than the Latin used for common law bills. In the reign of Edward III, the court found a fixed home at Westminster Hall, where it sat almost continually until its dissolution. Before this, justice was difficult to dispose because the lord chancellor had to travel with the King wherever he went.

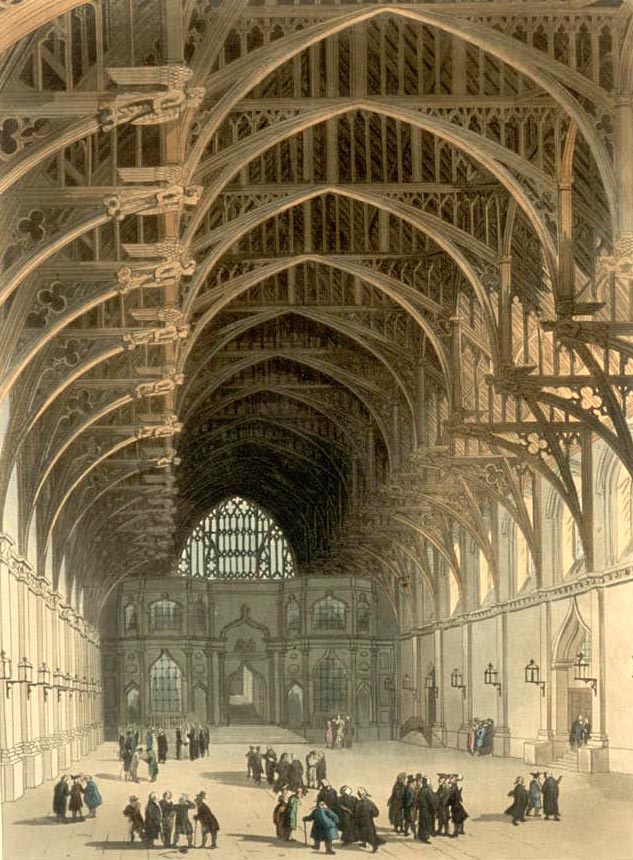
Westminster Hall, where the Court sat almost continuously from the reign of Edward III until its dissolution in 1875

By 1345 the lord chancellor began to be seen as the leader of the Court of Chancery, rather than as a representative of the king, and writs and bills were addressed directly to him. Under Richard II it became practice to consider the Chancery separate from the curia; academic William Carne considers this a key moment in confirming the independence of the Court of Chancery. The chancellor and his clerks often heard the cases directly, rather than having them referred to the council itself; occasionally a committee of lay and church members disposed of them, assisted by the judges of the common law courts. John Baker argues that it was the late 14th century that saw Chancery procedure become fixed, citing the work done by John Waltham as master of the rolls between 1381 and 1386, and notes that this period also saw the first complaints about the Chancery.

The Chancery and its growing powers soon came to be resented by Parliament and the nobility; Carne says that it is possible to trace a general "trend of opposition" during the Plantagenet period, particularly from members of the clergy, who were more used to Roman law than equity. From the reign of Richard II, the House of Commons regularly complained about the work of the court, and in 1390 it petitioned the king to pronounce that the court could not act contrary to the common law, nor annul a judgment without due process. At the same time, it asked that no writ could be issued that would compel a man to appear before the court; if it was, the clerk who issued it would lose his job and the lord chancellor would be fined £100. The king gave evasive answers to the requests, and made no decision. The Commons did succeed in making some changes to the court's procedure, however; in 1394 the King assented to their request that victorious defendants in the court have their costs recompensed from the other side, and in 1341 the king, on their application, allowed the lord chancellor to send cases directly to the common law courts, to avoid the common law judges having to waste time travelling. Kerly suggests that many complaints from the Commons came from lawyers of the common law, aggrieved at the Chancery's extended jurisdiction that overlapped with that of the common law. These complaints from the Commons did not prevent the court from successfully functioning; in 1393, for example, it was considered prominent enough that the House of Lords sent two cases there to be dealt with.

According to many academics, the Court of Chancery really began to expand its caseload during the 15th century; Margaret Avery reports a massive increase in cases during the 1440s, while Nicholas Pronay suggests that the real expansion came during Yorkist rule (1461–85), when the number of cases submitted each year quadrupled. He gives complaints about the perversion of justice in the common law courts, along with growing mercantile and commercial interests, as the main reason for the growth, arguing that this was the period when the Chancery changed from being an administrative body with some judicial functions to "one of the four central courts of the realm ... the growth in the number of [cases] is a primary indicator of the changing position of Chancery". This increasing role was assisted by the changing function of the court: until the late 14th century, private parties could not bring cases to the Chancery as they could to the other courts, while by the 15th century the number of private cases had increased to the point where there were many complaints in Parliament. Marsh writes that another reason for the Chancery's growing influence was the remedies available; through orders of specific performance and injunctions, the court could not only rectify previous wrongs but prevent future wrongs from occurring, while the common law courts were limited to awarding damages.

==== Chancery's role in development of Standard English ====
Chancery English, used in official documents, can be seen as the beginnings of Standard English – a national standard of spelling and grammar. By the 15th century, the City of Westminster had been the seat of government administration for about three centuries. After about 1430, the use of English in administrative documents replaced French which had been used since the Norman conquest. Consequently, the written English that developed at the Court of Chancery eventually became a standard, both in its style of handwriting ('Chancery hand') and in its grammar and vocabulary. By the 1440s and 1450s comparative regularisation of spelling had begun to emerge.

=== Competition with the common law ===
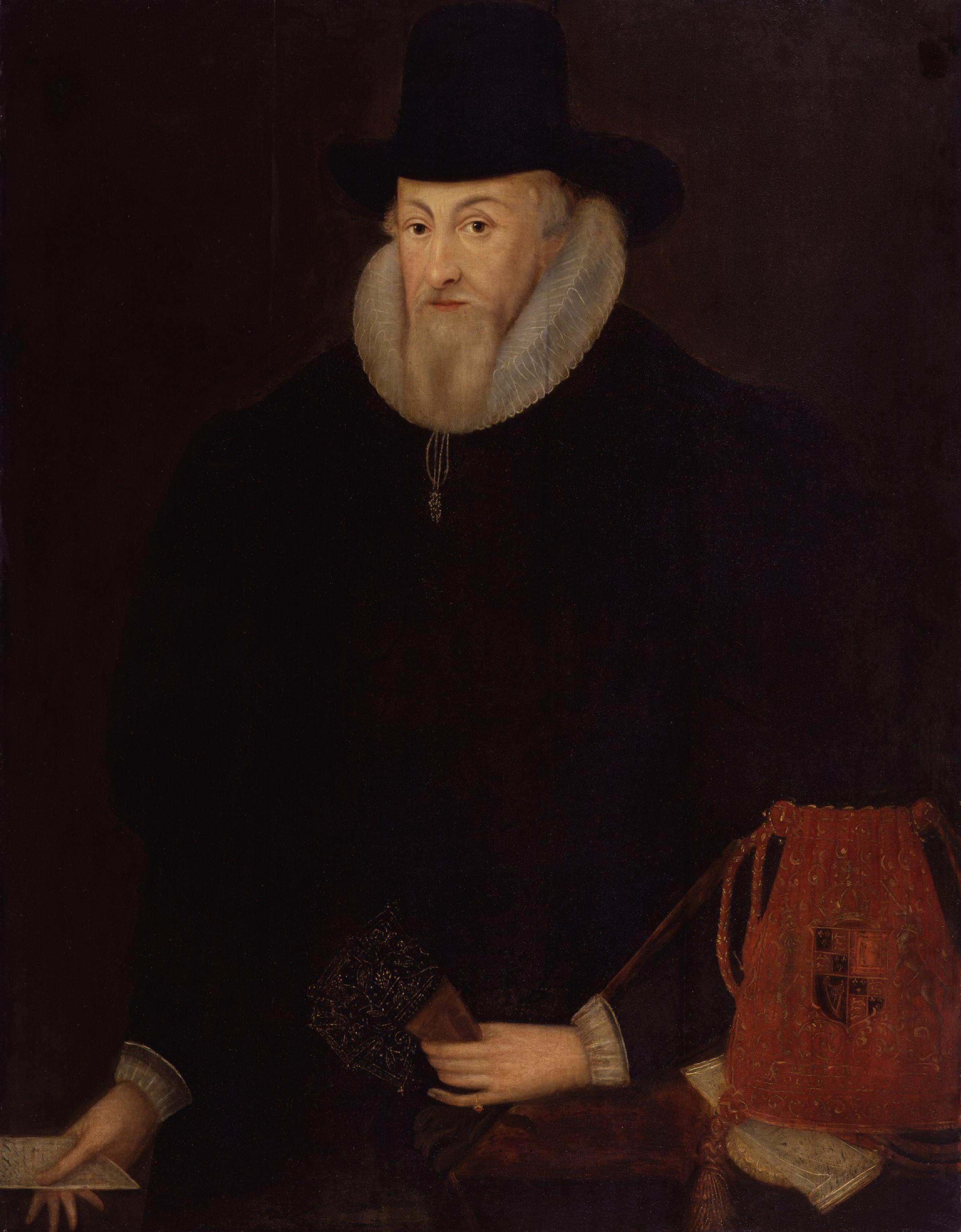
Lord Ellesmere, who worked to maintain the Chancery's ability to override the common law courts as lord chancellor

The early Elizabethan period featured a dispute between the Court of Chancery and common-law courts over who held pre-eminence. It had been the practice under Henry VI that plaintiffs in the common-law courts could not execute judgments given by the common-law judges if the lord chancellor felt their claim was "against conscience". This had been vehemently opposed by the common-law judges, who felt that if the lord chancellor had the power to override their decisions, parties to a case would flock to the Court of Chancery. The dispute over the pre-eminence of the lord chancellor continued into Elizabeth I's reign, with the judges increasing in strength; the lord chancellor was no longer a clergyman whom it was risky to offend, while the judges had grown in stature. Sir Edward Coke cites in his Reports a case at the end of Elizabeth I's reign which seems to indicate that the chancellor's prerogative had been overturned, when the judges (without opposition from the monarch) allowed a claim to proceed despite the lord chancellor's implied jurisdiction. At the same time, the common-law judges ruled that the Chancery had no jurisdiction over matters of freehold.

The lord chancellor of the time, Lord Ellesmere, was not dissuaded, and maintained that he had the jurisdiction to oversee decisions of the common-law courts and matters of freehold. In 1614, he heard the case of Courtney v. Glanvil, dictating that Glanvil should be imprisoned for deceit; this was over-ruled by Sir Edward Coke in the Court of King's Bench, who demanded that Glanvil be released and issued a writ of habeas corpus. Two years later, the Earl of Oxford's Case came before Ellesmere, who issued a judgment that directly contradicted English law based on the "Law of God". Coke and the other judges over-ruled this judgment while Ellesmere was ill, taking the case as an opportunity to completely overthrow the lord chancellor's jurisdiction. Ellesmere appealed to the Monarch, who referred the matter to the attorney general for the prince of Wales and Francis Bacon, the Attorney General for England and Wales. Both recommended a judgment in Ellesmere's favour, which the Monarch made, saying:

as mercy and justice be the true supports of our Royal Throne; and it properly belongeth to our princely office to take care and provide that our subjects have equal and indifferent justice ministered to them; and that when their case deserveth to be relieved in course of equity by suit in our Court of Chancery, they should not be abandoned and exposed to perish under the rigor and extremity of our laws, we ... do approve, ratifie and confirm, as well the practice of our Court of Chancery.

Coke's challenge to the Chancery is seen by academic Duncan Kerly as helping him lose his position as a judge, and until its dissolution the Court of Chancery could overrule judgments issued in the common-law courts. This was not the end of the dispute, however; in his Institutes of the Lawes of England, Coke suggested that the Monarch's decree was unlawful, and his contemporary David Jenkins wrote in Eight Centuries of Reports that "the excess of Jurisdiction in Chancery, in examining Judgments at Common Law" was one of the largest abuses of the law. In the late 17th century Robert Atkyns attempted to renew this controversy in his book An Enquiry into the Jurisdiction of the Chancery in Causes of Equity, but without any tangible result. Even so, future lord chancellors were more cautious; when Francis Bacon succeeded Ellesmere, he made sure to prevent the misuse of injunctions. Horowitz writes that this was not just limited to Bacon, and that "after the dramatic confrontations between Lord Chief Justice Coke and Lord Chancellor Ellesmere, chancellors took care to circumscribe the Court's corrective jurisdiction and to focus more narrowly on territories they had staked out as peculiarly their own".

=== Attempted reform under the Commonwealth of England ===
By the time of the English Civil War, the Court of Chancery was being criticised extensively for its procedure and practice. During the 16th century the Court was vastly overworked; Francis Bacon wrote of 2,000 orders being made a year, while Sir Edward Coke estimated the backlog to be around 16,000 cases. This was partly due to the incompetence of the judges, and partially due to the procedure used; evidence was re-heard up to three times and orders were issued and then over-ruled, only to be issued again: "what was ordered one day was contradicted the next, so as in some cases there had been five hundred orders and faire more as some affirmed". The Court spent a long time on each case, which, combined with the backlog, made the pursuit of a case extremely expensive. This was exacerbated by the appointment to the Court of useless, highly paid officials by the lord chancellor or master of the rolls, many of whom were their friends. The chancellor and master both openly sold these roles, whose exorbitant pay is more surprising considering that their duties were normally such that could be easily performed by solicitor's clerks, and that they were usually performed by underclerks, not by the officials.

In 1649, during the English Civil War, Parliament published a series of orders to reform the Court. Most were from the doctrines set out by Francis Bacon as lord chancellor, but there were some more modern reforms: counsels to the defendants could deliver pleas, rather than defendants in person, thus saving the cost of a Commissioner of Oaths, and cases were to be heard in the order they were accepted by the court. Parliament also fixed the fees that officers could charge, in an attempt to reduce the expense of a case. The following year, Parliament appointed a commission to look at court reform; this made many recommendations, but none that directly affected the Chancery. In August 1653 another debate took place in Parliament, lasting two days, in which a paper titled "Observations concerning the Court of Chancery" was circulated; this concerned the costs, workings, and officers of the Court. A second paper was given out, "for the regulation or taking away of the Court of Chancery, and settling the business of Equity according to the original and primitive constitution of it; and for taking away all unnecessary fees, offices and officers and formalities now used, and for the speedy dispatch of business".

Parliament eventually proposed dissolving the court as it then stood and replacing it with "some of the most able and honest men", who would be tasked with hearing equity cases. Rather than the mass of clerks on the staff, a sufficient number of "godly, able, honest and experienced clerks, which be working attorneys and clerks and not overseeing officers" would be appointed, and the Bar would elect two supervising Chief Clerks to advise on points of practice. A far-reaching and heavily criticised draft, this was eventually replaced by an even more thorough-going bill. The judges would be six Masters, who would sit in groups of three and be appointed by Parliament, assisted by a Chief Clerk. All justices of the peace would be allowed to submit cases to the court, with cases to be heard within 60 days. The party that lost the case was to pay full fees to the other side; the fees would be set ludicrously low. This bill was never put into effect, as Parliament was dissolved. Oliver Cromwell did appoint a Commission to institute similar provisions in 1654, but the Commission refused to perform its duties.

=== Restoration ===
After the English Restoration, those judges and officials sacked under Cromwell were reinstated, with little modern progression; as Kerly puts it, "unjust judges presided again, and rank maladministration invaded the offices". The situation was much improved, nonetheless, because many of the faults were down to the machinery of the court rather than the spirit, which Lord Clarendon soon rectified. Upon appointment as lord chancellor he immediately published a new issue of the Orders for the Regulation of the Practice of the Court of Chancery. This was based on the code set by the Cromwellian Commissioners, and limited the fees charged by the court and the amount of time they could take on a case.

An effect of the Civil War and resulting Commonwealth of England, particularly the "liberal" values and feelings it stirred up, was the continuous modernisation and improvement of the common law courts, something that reduced the interference of the lord chancellor in common law matters, except in areas where they had wildly divergent principles and law. Under Charles II, for the first time, there was a type of common law appeal where the nature of the evidence in the initial trial was taken into account, which reduced the need to go to the Court of Chancery. As a result, the nature of the Court of Chancery changed; rather than being a major corrective system for the common law, it became primarily concerned with the administration and protection of rights, as opposed to the common law courts, which were mainly concerned with the remedy and retribution of problems. This was further enforced by the Statute of Frauds, which confirmed Chancery principles across the board, allowing people to receive the same treatment in the common law courts as they did in the Chancery.

A major reform to the Court happened soon after the restoration, with the introduction of a right of appeal to the House of Lords from the Chancery. Before this there had been no records of appeals to the Lords, and a committee had concluded that there was no precedent to give the Lords jurisdiction over equity matters, except when problems and cases were sent directly to Parliament (as occasionally had been the case). In 1660 the Convention Parliament claimed for itself the right of appellate jurisdiction over equity matters, and also the right of original jurisdiction to hear equity cases at first instance. After disputes which lasted into the next Parliament, this second measure was dropped, but the right to hear equity appeals was confirmed. Horowitz writes that despite these changes, one of the academic certainties is that the problems which had dogged the court for the last two centuries persisted; Observations on the Dilatory and Expensive Proceedings in the Court of Chancery, written in 1701, listed 25 different procedures, areas and situations which contributed to the problems of high fees and slow processes.

=== Further reform ===
Lord Somers, following his dismissal as lord chancellor, introduced the Administration of Justice Act 1705 (4 & 5 Ann. c. 3) in 1706 which "became the most important act of law reform which the 18th century produced". The act significantly amended the existing law and court procedure, and while most of it was aimed at the common-law courts, it did affect the Chancery. For equity, the act provided that a party trying to have his case dismissed could not do so until he had paid the full costs, rather than the nominal costs that were previously required; at the same time, the reforms the act made to common-law procedure (such as allowing claims to be brought against executors of wills) reduced the need for parties to go to equity for a remedy. Legal historian Wilfrid Prest writes that despite these legislative enactments, the tally of which "begins to look quite impressive", the old problems continued, albeit less frequently; one barrister of the time claimed that going to the Court with a case worth anything less than £500 was a waste of time.

Under Lord Hardwicke, Chancery procedure was further reformed with a pair of orders published in 1741 and 1747, which mandated that a claimant who brought his case to court and had it dismissed immediately should pay full costs to the other side, rather than the 40 shillings previously paid, and that parties filing bills of review should pay £50 for the privilege. At the same time, a review of the Court's costs and fees was undertaken by a Parliamentary Committee. The Committee reported that fees and costs had increased significantly since the last review under Charles I, a number of expensive honorary positions had been created, and on many occasions court officers had not known what the correct fees were. At the same time, proceedings had grown to several thousand pages in length, necessitating additional expense. The Committee concluded "that the interest which a great number of officers and clerks have in the proceedings of the Court of Chancery, has been a principal cause of extending bills, answers, pleadings, examinations and other forms and copies of them, to an unnecessary length, to the great delay of justice and the oppression of the subject". They recommended that a list of permissible fees be published and circulated to the court officials.

The recommendations were not immediately acted on, but in 1743 a list of permissible fees was published, and to cut down on paperwork, no party was required to obtain office copies of proceedings. The permissible fees list contained over 1,000 items, which Kerly describes as "an appalling example of the abuses which the unrestrained farming of the Offices of the Court, and the payment of all officials by fees had developed".

=== Victorian era ===
High Court of Chancery Act 1815
- Act of Parliament
- Parliament of the United Kingdom
- Long title: An Act for making further Provision for the Secretary and Usher to the Vice Chancellor of England, and for the Clerks in the Office of the Accountant General of the High Court of Chancery, and for providing additional Clerks for the said Office.
- Citation: 55 Geo. 3. c. lxiv
- Territorial extent: England and Wales

Dates
- Royal assent: 7 June 1815
- Commencement: 7 June 1815 (Note: The Acts of Parliament (Commencement) Act 1793.)
- Repealed: 7 January 1873 (Note: Section 3. The Chancery Funds Rules 1872.)
Other legislation
Repealed by	Court of Chancery (Funds) Act 1872

Status: Repealed

Text of statute as originally enacted

The Court of Chancery in the early 19th century, sitting in Lincoln's Inn Old Hall

Despite these small reforms, the 18th century ended with continuous and unrestrained attacks on the court. Although complaints had been common since the time of Elizabeth I, the problems had become more unrestrained, at the same time as politically neutral law reformers first arose in any great number. Many critics were barristers of the common law, ignorant of the court's workings, but some, such as Sir Samuel Romilly, had trained as a Chancery advocate and were well aware of the Chancery's procedure. The success of the Code Napoleon and the writings of Jeremy Bentham are seen by academic Duncan Kerly to have had much to do with the criticism, and the growing wealth of the country and increasing international trade meant it was crucial that there be a functioning court system for matters of equity. While the upper classes had been struggling with the court for centuries, and regarded it as a necessary evil, the growing middle and merchant classes were more demanding. With increasing court backlogs, it was clear to many law reformers and politicians that serious reform was needed.

The first major reforms were the appointment of a vice-chancellor by the Administration of Justice Act 1813 to hear cases, and the extension of the Master of the Rolls' jurisdiction in 1833 to hear any and all cases. In 1824 a Chancery Commission was appointed to oversee the court, which the political opposition maintained was simply to protect it; the membership included the lord chancellor, the master of the rolls and all senior Chancery judges. Some significant reforms were proposed; in 1829, for example, Lord Lyndhurst proposed unsuccessfully that the equity jurisdiction of the Court of Exchequer be merged with the Chancery, and that a fourth judge be appointed to hear the additional cases. A year later, when the common law courts were each gaining a judge, he repeated his proposal, but the bill was strongly opposed by judges who maintained that the court backlog did not justify the additional expense of a fourth judge. Eventually, two more vice-chancellors were appointed in 1841, and a decade later two lord justices were tasked with hearing appeals from the Court through the Court of Appeal in Chancery. These are described by Lobban as "hasty reactions to mounting arrears" rather than the result of long-term planning.

Court of Chancery Act 1841 (Note: The citation of this act by this short title was authorised by section 1 of, and the first schedule to, the Short Titles Act 1896. Due to the repeal of those provisions it is now authorised by section 19(2) of the Interpretation Act 1978.)
- Act of Parliament
- Parliament of the United Kingdom
- Long title: An Act to make further Provisions for the Administration of Justice.
- Citation: 5 Vict. c. 5

Dates
- Royal assent: 5 October 1841
- Commencement: 15 October 1841 (Note: Section 1.)
- Repealed: 1 October 1966
Other legislation
Amended by	Court of Chancery (Funds) Act 1872; Civil Procedure Acts Repeal Act 1879; Statute Law Revision and Civil Procedure Act 1881; Public Records Act 1958
Repealed by	Rules of the Supreme Court (Revision) 1965 (SI 1965/1776)
Relates to	Public Record Office Act 1838; Court of Chancery Act 1840

Status: Repealed

Text of statute as originally enacted

As a result of the new appointments, the court backlog was significantly reduced – the court processed 1,700 cases in 1846–49 compared to 959 in 1819–24 – but it rose again after the death of Shadwell VC and retirement of Wigram VC. Shadwell, appointed under the Administration of Justice Act 1813 could be replaced, but a principal in the Court of Chancery Act 1841 (5 Vict. c. 5) (under which Wigram had been appointed) meant that it provided for two life appointments to the court, not two open positions; after the retirement or death of the judges, no more could be appointed. Again, the backlog became a problem, particularly since the lord chancellor was distracted with the appellate cases through the Court of Appeal in Chancery and the House of Lords, leaving a maximum of three Chancery judges who were available to hear cases. Further structural reforms were proposed; Richard Bethell suggested three more vice-chancellors and "an Appellate Tribunal in Chancery formed of two of the vice chancellors taken in rotation", but this came to nothing.

Thomas Pemberton attacked the Six Clerks in Parliament and successfully had their positions abolished.

Lord Chancellor's Pension Act 1832
- Act of Parliament
- Parliament of the United Kingdom
- Long title: An Act to abolish certain Sinecure Offices connected with the Court of Chancery, and to make Provision for the Lord High Chancellor on his Retirement from Office.
- Citation: 2 & 3 Will. 4. c. 111
- Territorial extent: United Kingdom

Dates
- Royal assent: 15 August 1832
- Commencement: 20 August 1833 (Note: Section 1.)
- Repealed: 25 April 2013
Other legislation
Amended by	Chancery Regulation Act 1833; Statute Law Revision Act 1874; Statute Law Revision Act 1890; Statute Law (Repeals) Act 1981
Repealed by	Public Service Pensions Act 2013

Status: Repealed

Text of statute as originally enacted

Revised text of statute as amended

Chancery Regulation Act 1833
- Act of Parliament
- Parliament of the United Kingdom
- Long title: An Act for the Regulation of the Proceedings and Practice of certain Offices of the High Court of Chancery in England.
- Citation: 3 & 4 Will. 4. c. 94
- Territorial extent: United Kingdom

Dates
- Royal assent: 28 August 1833
- Commencement: 28 August 1833 (Office of Clerk of the Affidavits); 26 November 1833 (rest of act); (Note: Section 53.)
- Repealed: 24 December 1888
Other legislation
Amends	Lord Chancellor's Pension Act 1832
Amended by	Master in Chancery Abolition Act 1852; Statute Law Revision Act 1874; Civil Procedure Acts Repeal Act 1879
Repealed by	Statute Law Revision (No. 2) Act 1888
Relates to	Public Record Office Act 1838

Status: Repealed

Text of statute as originally enacted

Court of Chancery Act 1842
- Act of Parliament
- Parliament of the United Kingdom
- Long title: An Act for abolishing certain Offices of the High Court of Chancery in England.
- Citation: 5 & 6 Vict. c. 103
- Territorial extent: United Kingdom

Dates
- Royal assent: 10 August 1842
- Commencement: 28 October 1842
- Repealed: 1 January 1926
Other legislation
Amended by	Statute Law Revision Act 1874 (No. 2); Civil Procedure Acts Repeal Act 1879; Commissioners for Oaths Act 1889
Repealed by	Supreme Court of Judicature (Consolidation) Act 1925
Relates to	Middlesex Registry Act 1708; Suitors in Chancery Relief Act 1852

Status: Repealed

Text of statute as originally enacted

The 1830s saw a reduction in the "old corruption" that had long plagued the court, first through the Lord Chancellor's Pension Act 1832 (2 & 3 Will. 4. c. 111) (which abolished a number of sinecure offices within the court and provided a pension and pay rise for the lord chancellor, in the hope that it would reduce the need for the chancellor to make money by selling court offices) and then through the Chancery Regulation Act 1833 (3 & 4 Will. 4. c. 94). (which changed the appointments system so that masters in Chancery would henceforth be appointed by the Crown, not by the lord chancellor, and that they would be paid wages.) Through the abolition of sinecures, taking into account the wages and pension, this saved the court £21,670 a year. The government had initially intended the 1832 bill to go further and abolish the Six Clerks, but the Clerks successfully lobbied to prevent this. This did not save them, however; in 1842 the "nettle" of the Six Clerks Office was grasped by Thomas Pemberton, who attacked them in the House of Commons for doing effectively sinecure work for high fees that massively increased the expense involved in cases. As a result, the Court of Chancery Act 1842 (5 & 6 Vict. c. 103) was passed in the same year that abolished the office of the Six Clerks completely.

Master in Chancery Abolition Act 1852 (Note: The Short Titles Act 1896 (59 & 60 Vict. c. 14) gave the short title "The Court of Chancery Act 1852" to both the act 15 & 16 Vict. c. 80 and the act 15 & 16 Vict. c. 87.)
- Act of Parliament
- Parliament of the United Kingdom
- Long title: An Act to abolish the Office of Master in Ordinary of the High Court of Chancery, and to make Provision for the more speedy and efficient Despatch of Business in the said Court.
- Citation: 15 & 16 Vict. c. 80
- Territorial extent: United Kingdom

Dates
- Royal assent: 30 June 1852
- Commencement: 30 June 1852
- Repealed: 1 January 1926
Other legislation
Amends	Chancery Regulation Act 1833
Amended by	Court of Chancery (Funds) Act 1872; Statute Law Revision Act 1875; Statute Law Revision and Civil Procedure Act 1881; Statute Law Revision and Civil Procedure Act 1883
Repealed by	Supreme Court of Judicature (Consolidation) Act 1925
Relates to	Suitors in Chancery Relief Act 1852

Status: Repealed

Text of statute as originally enacted

Suitors in Chancery Relief Act 1852
- Act of Parliament
- Parliament of the United Kingdom
- Long title: An Act for the Relief of the Suitors of the High Court of Chancery.
- Citation: 15 & 16 Vict. c. 87
- Territorial extent: United Kingdom

Dates
- Royal assent: 1 July 1852
- Commencement: 1 July 1852
- Repealed: 1 November 1960 (Note: The Mental Health Act 1959 (Commencement No. 3) Order 1960.)
Other legislation
Amended by	Lunacy Regulation Act 1853; Court of Chancery (Funds) Act 1872; Statute Law Revision Act 1875; Statute Law Revision and Civil Procedure Act 1881; Supreme Court of Judicature (Consolidation) Act 1925
Repealed by	Mental Health Act 1959
Relates to	Superannuation Act 1834; Court of Chancery Act 1842; Auctioneers Act 1845; Master in Chancery Abolition Act 1852

Status: Repealed

Text of statute as originally enacted

Some further procedural reforms were undertaken in the 1850s. In 1850, a new set of Chancery orders were produced by the lord chancellor, allowing masters to speed up cases in whatever way they chose and allowing plaintiffs to file a claim, rather than the more expensive and long-winded bill of complaint. The Suitors in Chancery Relief Act 1852 (15 & 16 Vict. c. 87) gave all court officials salaries, abolished the need to pay them fees and made it illegal for them to receive gratuities; it also removed more sinecure positions. The Master in Chancery Abolition Act 1852 (15 & 16 Vict. c. 80) abolished the masters in Chancery, allowing all cases to be heard directly by judges instead of bounced back-and-forth between judges and masters. As a result of these reforms the court became far more efficient, and the backlog decreased; in the 1860s an average of 3,207 cases were submitted each year, while the court heard and dismissed 3,833, many of them from the previous backlog. Much of this work was carried out by the growing number of clerks, however, and members of the legal profession became concerned about the "famine" of equity judges. Despite these reforms, it was still possible for Charles Dickens, writing in 1853 in the preface to his novel Bleak House, to bemoan the inefficiencies of the Court of Chancery. His novel revolves around a fictional long-running Chancery case, Jarndyce and Jarndyce. He observed that at the time he was writing there was a case before the Chancery court "which was commenced nearly twenty years ago ... and which is (I am assured) no nearer to its termination now than when it was begun". He concluded that "If I wanted other authorities for Jarndyce and Jarndyce, I could rain them on these pages, to the shame of a parsimonious public".

=== Dissolution ===
The idea of fusing the common-law and equity courts first came to prominence in the 1850s; although the Law Times dismissed it as "suicide" in 1852, the idea gained mainstream credibility, and by the end of the year the Times was writing that there was "almost unanimity" of opinion that the existence of two separate systems was "the parent of most of the defects in the administration of our law". Much of the impetus for fusion came from pressure groups and lawyers' associations. They partially succeeded with the Common Law Procedure Act 1854 and Chancery Amendment Act 1858, which gave both courts access to the full range of remedies. Until then, the common-law courts were limited to granting damages, and the Chancery was limited to granting specific performance or injunctions. The County Courts (Equity Jurisdiction) Act 1865 gave the county courts the authority to use equitable remedies, although it was rarely used. The lord chancellors during this period were more cautious, and despite a request by the lawyers' associations to establish a royal commission to look at fusion, they refused to do so.

After the Chancery Regulation Act 1862 had gone some way toward procedural reform, in February 1867, Roundell Palmer again brought the problem of having two separate court systems to Parliament's attention, and in March 1870 Lord Hatherley introduced a bill to create a single, unified High Court of Justice. The bill was a weak one, not containing any provision addressing which court would deal with the common law and which with equity, and was also silent on the structure of the court, as Hatherley believed the difference between the common law and equity was one of procedure, not substance. As a result, the bill was heavily opposed from two sides: those who opposed fusion, and those who supported fusion but felt the provisions were too weak and vague to be of any use. As a result, the bill was eventually withdrawn.

In 1873, the idea was resurrected – again by Palmer, who was now Lord Selborne and the new lord chancellor – as the Supreme Court of Judicature bill. While still cautious, Selborne's bill was far more structured than Hatherley's, and contained more detail on what was to be done. Rather than fusing the common law and equity, which he saw as impracticable since it would destroy the idea of trusts, he decided to fuse the courts and the procedure. The final draft provided that all of the existing superior courts would be fused into one court consisting of two levels; one of first instance, one appellate. The court of first instance, to be known as the High Court of Justice, would be subdivided into several divisions based on the old superior courts, one of which, the Chancery Division, would deal with equity cases. All jurisdiction of the Court of Chancery was to be transferred to the Chancery Division; Section 25 of the act provided that, where there was conflict between the common law and equity, the latter would prevail. An appeal from each division went to the appellate level, the Court of Appeal of England and Wales. These provisions were brought into effect after amendment with the Supreme Court of Judicature Act 1875, and the Court of Chancery ceased to exist. The Master of the Rolls was transferred to the new Court of Appeal, the lord chancellor retained his other judicial and political roles, and the position of vice-chancellor ceased to exist, replaced by ordinary judges. The Chancery Division remains to this day part of the High Court of Justice of England and Wales. On June 2, 2026, however, the Lady Chief Justice of England and Wales announced plans to replace the Chancery Division with a new Business and Property Division of the High Court. The Business and Property Division came into effect on 1 October 2026.

== Jurisdiction ==
=== Trusts and the administration of estates ===
The idea of a trust originated during the Crusades of the 12th century, when noblemen travelled abroad to fight in the Holy Land. As they would be away for years at a time it was vital that somebody could look after their land with the authority of the original owner. As a result, the idea of joint ownership of land arose. The common law courts did not recognise such trusts, and so it fell to equity and to the Court of Chancery to deal with them, as befitting the common principle that the Chancery's jurisdiction was for matters where the common law courts could neither enforce a right nor administer it. The use of trusts and uses became common during the 16th century, although the Statute of Uses "[dealt] a severe blow to these forms of conveyancing" and made the law in this area far more complex. The court's sole jurisdiction over trusts lasted until its dissolution.

From its foundation, the Court of Chancery could administer estates, due to its jurisdiction over trusts. While the main burden in the 16th century fell on the ecclesiastical courts, their powers over administrators and executors was limited, regularly necessitating the Court of Chancery's involvement. Before the Statute of Wills, many people used feoffees to dispose of their land, something that fell under the jurisdiction of the lord chancellor anyway. In addition, in relation to the discovery and accounting of assets, the process used by the Court of Chancery was far superior to the ecclesiastical one; as a result, the Court of Chancery was regularly used by beneficiaries. The common law courts also had jurisdiction over some estates matters, but their remedies for problems were far more limited.

Initially, the Court of Chancery would not entertain a request to administer an estate as soon as a flaw in the will was discovered, rather leaving it to the ecclesiastical courts, but from 1588 onwards the Court did deal with such requests, in four situations: where it was alleged that there were insufficient assets; where it was appropriate to force a legatee to give a bond to creditors (which could not be done in the ecclesiastical courts); to secure femme covert assets from a husband; and where the deceased's debts had to be paid before the legacies were valid.

=== Insanity and guardianship ===
The Chancery's jurisdiction over "lunatics" came from two sources: first, the king's prerogative to look after them, which was exercised regularly by the lord chancellor, and second, the Lands of Lunaticks Act 1324 (Ruffhead: 17 Edw. 2. c. 10), which gave the King (and therefore the chancellor) custodianship of lunatics and their land; the Lord chancellor exercised the first right directly and the second in his role as head of the Court of Chancery. This jurisdiction applied to any "idiots" or "lunatics", regardless of whether or not they were British, or whether their land was within England and Wales. They were divided into two categories – idiots, "who have no glimmering of reason from their birth and are, therefore, by law, presumed never likely to attain any", and lunatics, "who have had understanding but have lost the use of it". Lunatics and idiots were administered separately by the lord chancellor under his two prerogatives; the appeal under the king's prerogative went directly to the king, and under the Lands of Lunaticks Act 1324 to the House of Lords.

Idiots and lunatics had their land looked after by a court-appointed administrator, and any profits went into a trust fund to support the insane person. Due to the vested interest of the king (who would hold the lands) the actual lunacy or idiocy was determined by a jury, not by an individual judge. Under the Lunacy Act 1845 the lord chancellor had a right to appoint a commission to investigate the insanity of an individual; as part of his role as Keeper of the king's conscience, however, he would only do this when it was beneficial to the lunatic, not simply because somebody had been found insane.

The law courts' jurisdiction over the guardianship of children is said to have come from the king's prerogative of parens patriae. The Chancery had administered this area of law from an early period, since it primarily concerned the holding of land – a form of trust. Since these were mainly dealt with orally there are few early records; the first reference comes from 1582, when a curator was appointed to deal with the property of an infant. While the common law courts regularly appointed guardians, the Chancery had the right to remove them, replace them or create them in the first place. Similarly, while there were actions against guardians which the child could undertake in the common law courts, these were regularly undertaken in the Court of Chancery. This jurisdiction was first regularly recognised from 1696 onwards, and its main focus was the welfare of the child. As such, wards of the court had certain principles: their estates had to be administered under the supervision of the Court, they had to be educated under the same supervision, and any marriage had to be sanctioned by the Court.

=== Charities ===
The lord chancellor had, since the 15th century, been tasked with administering estates where the estate was to be used for charitable purposes. In Bailiff of Burford v Lenthall, Lord Hardwicke suggested that the jurisdiction of the Court over charity matters came from its jurisdiction over trusts, as well as from the Charitable Uses Act 1601. Carne suggests that, as the Court had long been able to deal with such situations, the 1601 act was actually just the declaration of pre-existing custom. This is illustrated by the chancellor's original jurisdiction over feoffments to uses, which came from his original status as a clergyman, as charity had been originally enforced by the Church and the ecclesiastical courts. Essentially, an owner of land could dispose of it by granting the right to use it and collect fees to another, not just by selling it. This was not valid at the common law courts but was in the Court of Chancery; the lord chancellor is reported as having said, in 1492, "where there is no remedy at common law there may be good remedy in conscience, as, for example, by a feoffment upon confidence, the feoffor has no remedy by common law, and yet by conscience he has; and so, if the feoffee transfers to another who knows of this confidence, the feoffor, by means of a subpoena, will have his rights in this Court". After the reign of Edward IV, if the charitable land were to be sold (or land were to be sold to create the charity) the Court of Chancery was the only place this could be done, as ecclesiastical and probate courts did not have a valid jurisdiction.

== Remedies ==
The Court of Chancery could grant three possible remedies – specific performance, injunctions and damages. The remedy of specific performance is, in contractual matters, an order by the court which requires the party in breach of contract to perform his obligations. The validity of the contract as a whole was not normally considered, only whether there was adequate consideration and if expecting the party that breached the contract to carry out his obligations was viable. Injunctions, on the other hand, are remedies which prevent a party from doing something (unlike specific performance, which requires them to do something). Until the Common Law Procedure Act 1854, the Court of Chancery was the only body qualified to grant injunctions and specific performance.

Damages is money claimed in compensation for some failure by the other party to a case. It is commonly believed that the Court of Chancery could not grant damages until the Chancery Amendment Act 1858 (21 & 22 Vict. c. 27), which gave it that right, but in some special cases it had been able to provide damages for over 600 years. The idea of damages was first conceived in English law during the 13th century, when the Statutes of Merton and Gloucester provided for damages in certain circumstances. Despite what is normally assumed by academics, it was not just the common law courts that could grant damages under these statutes; the Exchequer of Pleas and Court of Chancery both had the right to do so. In Cardinal Beaufort's case in 1453, for example, it is stated that "I shall have a subpoena against my feoffee and recover damages for the value of the land". A statute passed during the reign of Richard II specifically gave the Chancery the right to award damages, stating:

For as much as People be compelled to come before the King's Council, or in the Chancery by Writs grounded upon untrue Suggestions; that the Chancellor for the Time being, presently after that such Suggestions be duly found and proved untrue, shall have Power to ordain and award Damages according to his Discretion, to him which is so troubled unduly, as afore is said.

This did not extend to every case, but merely to those which had been dismissed because one party's "suggestions [are] proved untrue", and was normally awarded to pay for the innocent party's costs in responding to the party that had lied. Lord Hardwicke, however, claimed that the Chancery's jurisdiction to award damages was not derived "from any authority, but from conscience", and rather than being statutory was instead due to the lord chancellor's inherent authority. As a result, General Orders were regularly issued awarding the innocent party additional costs, such as the cost of a solicitor on top of the costs of responding to the other party's false statements.

The Court became more cautious about awarding damages during the 16th and 17th centuries; lord chancellors and legal writers considered it a common law remedy, and judges would normally only award damages where no other remedy was appropriate. Damages were sometimes given as an ancillary remedy, such as in Browne v Dom Bridges in 1588, where the defendant had disposed of waste inside the plaintiffs woods. As well as an injunction to prevent the defendant dumping waste in the woods, damages were also awarded to pay for the harm to the woods." This convention (that damages could only be awarded as an ancillary remedy, or where no others were available) remained the cause until the 18th and early 19th centuries, when the attitude of the Court towards awarding damages became more liberal; in Lannoy v Werry, for example, it was held that where there was sufficient evidence of harm, the Court could award damages in addition to specific performance and other remedies. This changed with Todd v Gee in 1810, where Lord Eldon held that "except in very special cases, it was not the course of proceeding in Equity to file a Bill for specific performance of an agreement; praying in the alternative, if it cannot be performed, an issue, or an inquiry before the Master, with a view to damages. The plaintiff must take that remedy, if he chooses it, at Law." This was followed by Hatch v Cobb, in which Chancellor Kent held that "though equity, in very special cases, may possibly sustain a bill for damages, on a breach of contract, it is clearly not the ordinary jurisdiction of the court".

The Court's right to give damages was reiterated in Phelps v Prothero in 1855, where the Court of Appeal in Chancery held that if a plaintiff starts an action in a court of equity for specific performance and damages are also appropriate, the court of equity may choose to award damages. This authorisation was limited to certain circumstances, and was again not regularly used. Eventually, the Chancery Amendment Act 1858 gave the Court full jurisdiction to award damages; the situation before that was so limited that lawyers at the time commented as if the Court had not previously been able to do so.

== Officers ==
=== Lord Chancellor ===
The Lord Chancellor was the official head of the Court of Chancery. For much of its early existence he was closely linked with the curia regis; even after the Court became independent around 1345, petitions were addressed to "the king and others". By the time of Edward IV, however, petitions were issued in the name of the lord chancellor and the Court of Chancery. In the early years, the lord chancellor made most of the decisions himself; he summoned the parties, set a date for hearings, addressed questions from the parties to the case and announced the verdict. He regularly called for assistance from the common law judges, who complained that this prevented them from doing the work of the common law courts, and early records frequently say that the decision was made "with the advice and consent of the justices and servants of our Lord the King in the Chancery".

In one period, particularly under Edward III, the Lord Chancellor also possessed some common law jurisdiction, able to hear cases for petitions of right and the repeal of letters patent, as well as other cases in which the King was a party. He heard cases on recognizances, the execution of acts of Parliament and any case in which an officer of the Court of Chancery was involved. Records show that he enrolled recognizances and contracts, and also issued writs commanding a sheriff to enforce them. Carne considers that this common law jurisdiction was likely down to a failure to separate the common law jurisdiction and the equity jurisdiction possessed by the lord chancellor, a failure that continued into the 16th century; Sir Edward Coke wrote that in the Chancery there was both an ordinary court and an "extraordinary" one.

Most of the early lord chancellors were members of the clergy; the first legally trained lord chancellor was Robert Parning SL, who was appointed in 1341 and held the office for two years. His successors were again clerics until the appointment of Robert Thorpe in 1371, probably due to pressure from Parliament. The precedent of appointing legally trained Lord Chancellors was not followed strongly, although others such as Nicholas Bacon did hold the office; one lord chancellor is said to have been appointed because the Queen was impressed with his skill at dancing. According to William Carne, Thomas Egerton was the first "proper" lord chancellor from the Court of Chancery's point of view, having recorded his decisions and followed the legal doctrine of precedent. Marsh writes that the use of clergymen as lord chancellors had a tremendous influence on the Court's actions, tracing the idea of following natural law in the Court back to the chancellors' Christian roots. Following the dissolution of the Court of Chancery in 1873, the lord chancellor failed to have any role in equity, although his membership of other judicial bodies allowed him some indirect control.

=== Other officers of the Court ===
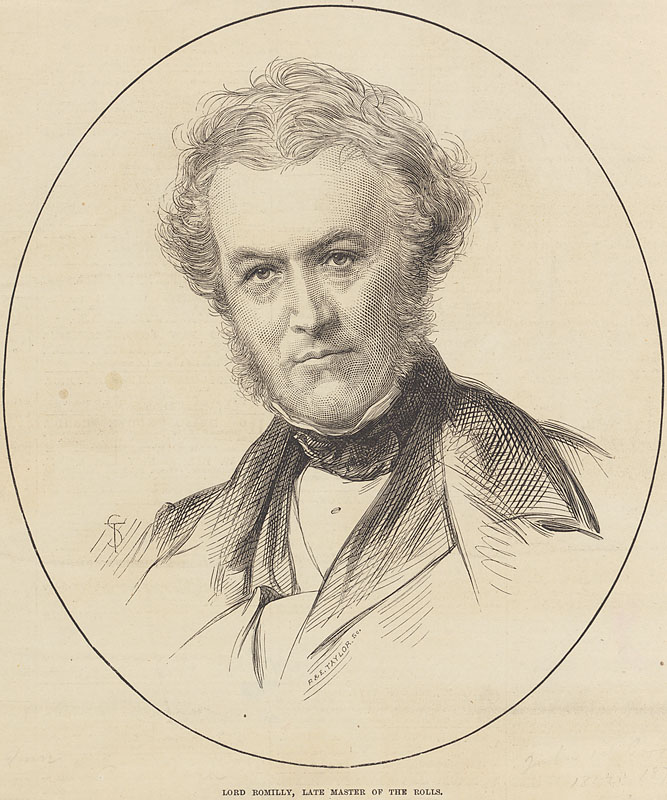
John Romilly, the last Master of the Rolls to sit in the Court of Chancery

When the Court was a part of the curia regis, the officers were fluid; they could include doctors of civil law, members of the curia and "those who ought to be summoned". As the members of the curia ceased to sit as Officers, however, the composition of the court became more solid. From an early period, the lord chancellor was assisted by twelve Clerks in Chancery, known as the Masters in Chancery. It was said that these positions had existed since before the Norman Conquest, sitting as part of the Witenagemot. After the conquest they gradually lost their authority, and became advisers and assistants to the lord chancellor. It was the masters who started court cases, issuing the initial writs without which parties could not begin cases in the common law courts. In addition, they took depositions and acted as secretaries to the lord chancellor, maintaining the plea rolls. In the early years they were almost always members of the clergy, called the "clericos de prima forma"; it was not until the reign of Edward III that they were referred to as Masters in Chancery.

The twelve Masters in Chancery were led by one of their number, known as the master of the rolls. He was almost as powerful as the lord chancellor, and had wielded judicial power since the time of Edward I. He was sometimes known as the "vice-chancellor", and was given the title "The Right Worshipful". The master of the rolls assisted the court's judges in forming judgments, and regularly sat in place of the lord chancellor. The first reference to the Master of the Rolls comes from 1286, although it is believed that the position probably existed before that; the first reference to his having independent judicial authority is from 1520. The master of the rolls had six clerks, who helped keep the records; they were independently accountable for any mistakes. These were initially solicitors for the people suing in the court, and no other counsel was allowed, but by the time of Francis Bacon claimants were allowed their own counsel. The master of the Rolls and his clerks were housed in the Rolls Office, along with the Six Clerks' clerks, who numbered sixty. The Six Clerks were abolished in 1843, the masters in Chancery in 1852, and when the Court of Chancery was abolished, the master of the rolls moved to the newly established Court of Appeal of England and Wales.

From an early period, the Court was also assisted by two registrars, who enrolled decrees of the court and orders; their books documented the legal precedent set by the court. At the same time, two examiners were appointed to assist the master of the rolls in examining witnesses. The positions were regularly and openly sold by the master of the rolls and lord chancellor – masters in Chancery went for £6,000 in 1625. To avoid the sale of offices, and due to the corruption of many court officials, an act was passed that year requiring that fees be paid directly into the Bank of England, and creating an Accountant-General to oversee the financial aspects of the court. In 1813 the first vice-chancellor was appointed to deal with the increasing number of cases submitted to the Court. With the backlog growing larger, two more were appointed in 1841 under the Court of Chancery Act 1841 (5 Vict. c. 5), although this provided for two life appointments, not two new positions; when the new vice-chancellors died, there could be no replacements. With the dissolution of the Court in 1873, the position of vice-chancellor ceased to exist.

== See also ==
- Court of equity
- Chancery Lane
- Court of Chancery (Ireland)
- Court of Chancery of the County Palatine of Durham and Sadberge
- Three Courts of Chancery in the United States of America
  - Delaware Court of Chancery
  - Michigan Court of Chancery
  - New York Court of Chancery
- Subpoena ad testificandum
- Subpoena duces tecum
- Wyoming Chancery Court
- The Court of Chancery of the County Palatine of Lancaster

== Bibliography ==
- Adams, John; Robert Ralston (1855). The doctrine of equity: a commentary on the law as administered by the Court of chancery. T. & J. W. Johnson. OCLC 60727816.
- Baker, J.H. (2002). An Introduction to English Legal History. Butterworths. ISBN 0-406-93053-8.
- Carne, William Lindsay (1927). "A Sketch of the History of the High Court of Chancery from Its Origin to the Chancellorship of Wolsey". Virginia Law Register. 13 (7). Virginia Law Review: 391–421. doi:10.2307/1108431. ISSN 1547-1357. JSTOR 1108431.
- Carne, William Lindsay (1928). "A Sketch of the History of the High Court of Chancery from the Chancellorship of Wolsey to That of Lord Nottingham". Virginia Law Register. 13 (10). Virginia Law Review: 589–619. doi:10.2307/1108266. ISSN 1547-1357. JSTOR 1108266.
- D., T.W. (January 1862). "The Jurisdiction of the Court of Chancery to Enforce Charitable Uses". American Law Register. 10 (3). University of Pennsylvania Law Review.
- D., T.W. (April 1862). "The Jurisdiction of the Court of Chancery to Enforce Charitable Uses (Continued)". American Law Register. 10 (6). University of Pennsylvania Law Review.
- Hanworth, Lord (1935). "Some Notes on the Office of Master of the Rolls". Cambridge Law Journal. 5 (3). Cambridge University Press: 313–331. doi:10.1017/S0008197300124675. ISSN 0008-1973. S2CID 144982031.
- Horowitz, Henry (1996). "Continuity or Change in the Court of Chancery in the Seventeenth and Eighteenth Centuries?". Journal of British Studies. 35 (1). University of Chicago Press: 24–57. doi:10.1086/386095. S2CID 143853191.
- Hudson, Alastair (2009). Equity and Trusts (6th ed.). Routledge-Cavendish. ISBN 978-0-415-49771-8.
- Kerly, Duncan (1890). An historical sketch of the equitable jurisdiction of the Court of Chancery. Cambridge University Press. ISBN 0-8377-2331-0. OCLC 213543694.
- Lobban, Michael (Spring 2004). "Preparing for Fusion: Reforming the Nineteenth-Century Court of Chancery, Part I". Law and History Review. 22 (2). University of Illinois Press. ISSN 0738-2480.
- Lobban, Michael (Autumn 2004). "Preparing for Fusion: Reforming the Nineteenth-Century Court of Chancery, Part II". Law and History Review. 22 (3). University of Illinois Press. ISSN 0738-2480.
- Marsh, Alfred Henry (1890). History of the Court of Chancery and of the rise and development of the doctrines of equity. Carswell & co. ISBN 0-665-09917-7. OCLC 276334548.
- McDermott, Peter M. (1992). "Jurisdiction of the Court of Chancery to award damages". Law Quarterly Review (108). Sweet & Maxwell. ISSN 0023-933X.
- McKendrick, Ewan (2007). Contract Law (7th ed.). Palgrave Macmillan. ISBN 978-0-230-01883-9.
- Parkes, Joseph (1828). A history of the Court of chancery; with practical remarks on the recent commission, report, and evidence, and on the means of improving the administration of justice in the English courts of equity. Longman Rees. OCLC 6248969.
- Ramjohn, Mohamed (1998). Sourcebook on Trusts Law. Routledge. ISBN 1-85941-186-X.
- Sainty, John (1993). The Judges of England 1272–1990: a list of judges of the superior courts. Oxford: Selden Society. ISBN 0-85423-129-3. OCLC 29670782.
- Peel, Edwin (2007). The Law of Contract (12th ed.). Sweet & Maxwell. ISBN 978-0-421-94840-2.
- Tucker, P. (2000). "The Early History of the Court of Chancery: A Comparative Study". English Historical Review. 115 (463). Oxford University Press: 791–811. doi:10.1093/ehr/115.463.791. ISSN 0013-8266.
