= Statute Law Revision and Civil Procedure Act 1881 =

Act of the Parliament of the United Kingdom

Statute Law Revision and Civil Procedure Act 1881 (Note: Section 1.)
- Act of Parliament
- Parliament of the United Kingdom
- Long title: An Act for promoting the revision of the Statute Law by repealing various enactments chiefly relating to Civil Procedure or matters connected therewith, and for amending in some respects the law relating to Civil Procedure
- Citation: 44 & 45 Vict. c. 59
- Introduced by: Roundell Palmer, 1st Baron Selborne (Lords)
- Territorial extent: England and Wales (Note: Section 2.)

Dates
- Royal assent: 27 August 1881
- Commencement: 27 August 1881 (Note: The Acts of Parliament (Commencement) Act 1793.)
- Repealed: 16 November 1989
Other legislation
Amends	See § Repealed enactments
Repeals/revokes	See § Repealed enactments
Amended by	Statute Law Revision Act 1894
Repealed by	Statute Law (Repeals) Act 1989
Relates to	Repeal of Obsolete Statutes Act 1856; See Statute Law Revision Act

Status: Repealed

History of passage through Parliament

Records of Parliamentary debate relating to the statute from Hansard

Text of statute as originally enacted

The Statute Law Revision and Civil Procedure Act 1881 (44 & 45 Vict. c. 59) was an act of the Parliament of the United Kingdom that repealed for England and Wales enactments relating to civil procedure from 1235 to 1880 which had ceased to be in force or had become necessary. The act was intended, in particular, to facilitate the preparation of the revised edition of the statutes, then in progress.

== Background ==
In the United Kingdom, acts of Parliament remain in force until expressly repealed. Blackstone's Commentaries on the Laws of England, published in the late 18th-century, raised questions about the system and structure of the common law and the poor drafting and disorder of the existing statute book.

From 1810 to 1825, The Statutes of the Realm was published, providing the first authoritative collection of acts. The first statute law revision act was not passed until 1856 with the Repeal of Obsolete Statutes Act 1856 (19 & 20 Vict. c. 64). This approach — focusing on removing obsolete laws from the statute book followed by consolidation — was proposed by Peter Locke King MP, who had been highly critical of previous commissions' approaches, expenditures, and lack of results.

Previous statute law revision acts
Year passed	Title	Citation	Effect
1861	Statute Law Revision Act 1861	24 & 25 Vict. c. 101	Repealed or amended over 800 enactments
1863	Statute Law Revision Act 1863	26 & 27 Vict. c. 125	Repealed or amended over 1,600 enactments for England and Wales
1867	Statute Law Revision Act 1867	30 & 31 Vict. c. 59	Repealed or amended over 1,380 enactments
1870	Statute Law Revision Act 1870	33 & 34 Vict. c. 69	Repealed or amended over 250 enactments
1871	Promissory Oaths Act 1871	34 & 35 Vict. c. 48	Repealed or amended almost 200 enactments
1871	Statute Law Revision Act 1871	34 & 35 Vict. c. 116	Repealed or amended over 1,060 enactments
1872	Statute Law Revision Act 1872	35 & 36 Vict. c. 63	Repealed or amended almost 490 enactments
1872	Statute Law (Ireland) Revision Act 1872	35 & 36 Vict. c. 98	Repealed or amended over 1,050 enactments
1872	Statute Law Revision Act 1872 (No. 2)	35 & 36 Vict. c. 97	Repealed or amended almost 260 enactments
1873	Statute Law Revision Act 1873	36 & 37 Vict. c. 91	Repealed or amended 1,225 enactments
1874	Statute Law Revision Act 1874	37 & 38 Vict. c. 35	Repealed or amended over 490 enactments
1874	Statute Law Revision Act 1874 (No. 2)	37 & 38 Vict. c. 96	Repealed or amended almost 470 enactments
1875	Statute Law Revision Act 1875	38 & 39 Vict. c. 66	Repealed or amended over 1,400 enactments
1876	Statute Law Revision (Substituted Enactments) Act 1876	39 & 40 Vict. c. 20	Updated references to repealed acts
1878	Statute Law Revision (Ireland) Act 1878	41 & 42 Vict. c. 57	Repealed or amended over 460 enactments passed by the Parliament of Ireland
1878	Statute Law Revision Act 1878	41 & 42 Vict. c. 79	Repealed or amended over 90 enactments
1879	Statute Law Revision (Ireland) Act 1879	42 & 43 Vict. c. 24	Repealed or amended over 460 enactments passed by the Parliament of Ireland
1879	Civil Procedure Acts Repeal Act 1879	42 & 43 Vict. c. 59	Repealed or amended over 130 enactments

== Passage ==
The Statute Law Revision and Civil Procedure Bill had its first reading in the House of Lords on 1 July 1881, presented by the Lord Chancellor, Roundell Palmer, 1st Baron Selborne. The bill had its second reading in the House of Lords on 7 July 1881, introduced by the Lord Chancellor, Roundell Palmer, 1st Baron Selborne, and was committed to a committee of the whole house, which met and reported on 8 July 1881, without amendments. The bill had its third reading in the House of Lords on 15 July 1881 and passed, without amendments.

The bill had its first reading in the House of Commons on 20 July 1881. The bill had its second reading in the House of Commons on 26 July 1881 and, following a division, was committed to a committee of the whole house, which met and reported on 18 August 1881, without amendments. The bill had its third reading in the House of Commons on 22 August 1881 and passed, without amendments.

The bill was granted royal assent on 27 August 1881.

== Subsequent developments ==
The act was criticised for not including any repeals related to the Common Law Procedure Act 1852 (15 & 16 Vict. c. 76) and for not repealing Keating's Act [the Summary Procedure on Bills of Exchange Act 1855] (18 & 19 Vict. c. 67). The act was also criticised for repealing part of the Statute of Frauds (29 Cha. 2. c. 33) and for reviving the power of surveyors of taxes to make domiciliary visits, a power taken away by the Taxes Management Act 1880 (43 & 44 Vict. c. 19).

The schedule to the act was repealed by section 1 of, and the first schedule to, the Statute Law Revision Act 1894 (57 & 58 Vict. c. 54), which came into force on 25 August 1894.

The Crown Office Rules 1906 were made under the authority conferred by this section. As to this section and those rules, see R v Amendt.

Section 6 of the act was repealed by section 226(1) of, and schedule 6 to, the Supreme Court of Judicature (Consolidation) Act 1925 (15 & 16 Geo. 5. c. 49), which came into force on 1 January 1926.

The whole act was repealed by section 1(1) of, and part XI of schedule 1 to, the Statute Law (Repeals) Act 1989, which came into force on 16 November 1989.

== Repealed enactments ==
Section 2 of the act provided that the act did not extend to Scotland or Ireland.

Section 3 of the act repealed 98 enactments, listed in the schedule to the act, across six categories: (Note: The Note of the bill, unlike the schedule, gives commentary on each act, noting any earlier repeals and the reason for the new repeal.)

- Expired
- Spent
- Repealed in general terms
- Virtually repealed
- Superseded
- Obsolete

Section 4 of the act included several safeguards to ensure that the repeal does not negatively affect existing rights or ongoing legal matters. Specifically, any legal rights, privileges, or remedies already obtained under the repealed laws, as well as any legal proceedings or principles established by them, remain unaffected. Section 1 of the act also ensured that repealed enactments that have been incorporated into other laws would continue to have legal effect in those contexts.

Section 5 of the act provided that any repeals would not revive any former rights, offices, or jurisdictions that had already been abolished.

Section 6 of the act extended the powers in the Judicature Acts, including the Supreme Court of Judicature Act 1875 (38 & 39 Vict. c. 77) to make rules of court.

Citation	Short title	Title	Extent of repeal
20 Hen. 3. c. 1	Damages on Writ Dower Act 1235	The Provisions of Merton. Chapter one. Damages to widows on a writ of dower.	The whole act.
52 Hen. 3. c. 3	Resisting King's officers in replevin, etc.	The Statute of Marlborough. Chapter three. Of resisting the King's officers in replevin. Distresses for services not due.	The whole act.
52 Hen. 3. c. 5	Confirmation of charters	The Statute of Marlborough. Chapter five. Confirmation of the Great Charter. Charter of the Forest.	The whole act.
52 Hen. 3. c. 9	Suits of Court Act 1267	The Statute of Marlborough. Chapter nine. Who shall try suits of Court. Suits of Court by parceners, &c. The tenant's remedy against the lord, distraining for suits not due. The lord's remedy against the tenants, withholding their due suits.	The whole act.
52 Hen. 3. c. 10	Sheriff's tourns	The Statute of Marlborough. Chapter ten. Exemptions from attending the sheriff's turns.	The whole act.
52 Hen. 3. c. 21	Replevin	The Statute of Marlborough. Chapter twenty-one. Sheriff, upon plaint, shall make replevin.	The whole act.
52 Hen. 3. c. 23	Waste Act 1267	The Statute of Marlborough. Chapter twenty-three. Remedy against accountants. Farmers shall do no waste. Remedy thereon.	from "and it is provided" to "make their account."
3 Edw. 1. c. 19	Crown Debts Act 1275	The Statutes of Westminster; the First. Sheriff, &c. receiving the King's debts shall acquit the debtor. Penalty. Taking of summons.	The whole act.
13 Edw. 1. c. 2	Real actions	The Statutes of Westminster; the Second. Chapter two. Mischiefs to lords distraining their tenants by replevin. A recordare to remove the plaint out of the county courts. Pledges to prosecute a replevin. Replevin of distress after judgment for return. Writ of second deliverance. Distress irreplevible.	The whole act.
13 Edw. 1. c. 30	Justices of nisi prius, etc.	The Statutes of Westminster; the Second. Chapter thirty. Assignment of justices of nisi prius. Adjournment of assises. Inquisitions of trespas, &c. may be determined before justices of nisi prius. The writ of nisi prius. Proceedings after verdict. Clerks of nisi prius precluded that there shall be repel'd before another in their own clerks. Double verdicts. None shall be in prius unless summoned.	The whole act.
13 Edw. 1. c. 31	Bills of exceptions	The Statutes of Westminster; the Second. Chapter thirty-one. Proceedings on bills of exceptions.	The whole act.
21 Edw. 1	Justices of Assize Act 1293	Statute of the Justices of Assise.	The whole act. (Note: This act was already repealed for England and Wales by Criminal Statutes Repeal Act 1827 (7 & 8 Geo. 4. c. 27), for Ireland by Criminal Statutes (Ireland) Repeal Act 1828 (9 Geo. 4. c. 53) and for India by Criminal Law (India) Act 1828 ([9 Geo. 4]]. c. 74))
27 Edw. 1	Statutum de Finibus Levatis	The Statute of Fines levied.	The whole act.
28 Edw. 1. c. 16	False returns	Articles upon the Charters. Chapter sixteen. False returns.	The whole act.
9 Edw. 2. stat. 2	Statutum Lincoln' de Vicecomitibȝ	The Statute of Sheriffs.	from "and that the execution of writs" to end of Statute.
12 Edw. 2	Statutum Eborac'	The Statute of York.	The whole act.
Statutes of uncertain date	Les Estatuz del Eschekere	The Statutes of the Exchequer.	from "And the treasurer and barons" to "the King's revenue."
1 Edw. 3. stat. 1. c. 1	Personal	Statute the First.	The whole act.
1 Edw. 3. stat. 1. c. 2	Personal	Statute the First.	The whole act.
1 Edw. 3. stat. 1. c. 3	Civil Procedure, etc. Act 1327	Statute the First.	The whole act.
1 Edw. 3. stat. 1. c. 4	False Judgment	Statute the First.	The whole act.
1 Edw. 3. stat. 1. c. 5	Liberty	Statute the First.	The whole act.
2 Edw. 3. c. 2	Pardons for Felony, Justices of Assize, etc. Act 1328	Statute made at Northampton. Chapter two. Pardons for felony. Justices of assise and gaol delivery. Oyers and terminers.	The whole act.
4 Edw. 3. c. 1	Justices of assise & gaol delivery: justices of the peace	Statute made at Westminster.	Except chapter seven.
4 Edw. 3. c. 9	Hundred: Sheriff	Statute made at Westminster.	Except chapter seven.
4 Edw. 3. c. 11	Justices of assize	Statute made at Westminster.	Except chapter seven.
14 Edw. 3. stat. 1. c. 16	Nisi prius	Statute made at Westminster. Chapter sixteen. Nisi prius may be granted before a justice of Common Pleas in his own county or before justices of assise or before justices of nisi prius appointed by the King in the time appointed by the law; or before justices of assise, and justices of nisi prius may give judgments at nisi prius against darrain presentment.	The whole act.
18 Edw. 3. stat. 3. c. 5	Prohibitions	Statute the Third. Chapter five. Prohibitions.	The whole act.
20 Edw. 3 Ordinance for the Justices c. 1	Civil Procedure Act 1346	Ordinance for the Justice.	The whole act.
20 Edw. 3 Ordinance for the Justices c. 2	Exchequer Court	Ordinance for the Justice.	The whole act.
20 Edw. 3 Ordinance for the Justices c. 3	Maintenance and Champerty	Ordinance for the Justice.	The whole act.
20 Edw. 3 Ordinance for the Justices c. 6	Justices of Assize	Ordinance for the Justice.	The whole act.
8 Ric. 2. c. 1	Confirmation of liberties, etc	Statute made at Westminster in the Eighth Year.	The whole act.
8 Ric. 2. c. 2	Justices of Assize, etc. Act 1384	Statute made at Westminster in the Eighth Year.	The whole act.
8 Ric. 2. c. 3	Administration of justice	Statute made at Westminster in the Eighth Year.	The whole act.
8 Ric. 2. c. 4	False entries of pleas, etc.	Statute made at Westminster in the Eighth Year.	The whole act.
8 Ric. 2. c. 6	Jurisdiction of constable and marshal	Statute made at Westminster in the Eighth Year.	The whole act.
11 Ric. 2. c. 10	N/A	The Statute made at Westminster in the Eleventh year.	The whole act.
12 Ric. 2. c. 10	Justices of the Peace Quarter Sessions Act 1388	Statute made at Cambridge in the Twelfth year. Chapter ten. Six justices of the peace in each county; Quarterly sessions, &c. Wages of justices and their clerk. No steward, &c. shall be assigned. Judges, &c., need not attend the sessions regularly.	from "and that no steward of any lord shall be assigned" to "in any of the said Commissions."
13 Ric. 2. stat. 1. c. 4	Clerk of market of King's house	Statute of the Thirteenth Year.	Except chapter one.
13 Ric. 2. stat. 1. c. 5	Jurisdiction of admiral and deputy	Statute of the Thirteenth Year.	Except chapter one.
13 Ric. 2. stat. 1. c. 7	Justices of the Peace Act 1389	Statute of the Thirteenth Year.	Except chapter one.
7 Hen. 4. c. 3	Fines and Forfeitures	Statute of the Seventh Year. Chapter three. The rolls of estreats of issues, fines, &c., shall contain particular of the order and forfeiture, &c. The Statute 42 Edw. 3. c. 9., touching gathering of Green Wax, confirmed.	The whole act.
34 & 35 Hen. 8. c. 26	Laws in Wales Act 1542	All Acts for certain Ordinances in the King's Dominions and Principality of Wales.	Sections five to twenty-two, twenty-nine to fifty-two, seventy-three to seventy-seven, eighty-nine, eighty-three, eighty-eight, eighty-nine, ninety-six, ninety-nine, one hundred and three, one hundred and thirteen, one hundred and fourteen, and one hundred and fifteen.
23 Eliz. c. 3	Fines and Recoveries Act 1580	An Act for the reformation of errors in fines and recoveries.	The whole act.
17 Chas. 2. c. 7	Distresses and Avowries for Rents Act 1665	An Act for more speedy and effectual proceeding upon distresses and avowryes for rents.	The whole act.
29 Chas. 2. c. 3	Statute of Frauds	An Act for Prevention of Frauds and Perjuries.	Section ten, to "execution shall be sued," and Section seventeen.
12 & 13 Will. 3. c. 2	Act of Settlement	An Act for the further Limitation of the Crown, and better securing the rights and liberties of the Subject.	Section three, from "That after the said limitation shall take effect as aforesaid, judges commissions" to "remove them."
9 Anne. c. 25	Municipal Offices Act 1710	An Act the title whereof begins with the words,—An Act for rendering,—and ends with the words,—in corporations and boroughs.	from "An Act for rendering" to "in corporations and boroughs".
5 Geo. 2. c. 27	Process for Small Debts Act 1731	An Act to explain, amend, and render more effectual an Act, made in the twelfth year of the reign of His late Majesty King George the First [intituled an Act to prevent frivolous and vexatious Arrests].	The whole act.
11 Geo. 2. c. 19	Distress for Rent Act 1737	An Act for the more effectual securing the payment of Rents and preventing Frauds by Tenants.	Section twenty-three.
12 Geo. 2. c. 27	Justices of Assize Act 1738	An Act the title whereof begins with the words,—An Act for explaining and amending,—and ends with the words,—Justice of Assize in his County.	The whole act.
43 Geo. 3. c. 161	House Tax Act 1803	An Act the title whereof begins with the words,—An Act for repealing,—and ends with the words,—on Commission.	Section ten, from "and where any such dwelling-house" to end of section.
52 Geo. 3. c. 101	Charities Procedure Act 1812	An Act to provide a summary remedy in cases of abuses of trusts created for charitable purposes.	Section one, from "and such order shall be final and conclusive unless" to end of section.
1 Will. 4. c. 7	Execution of Judgments Act 1831	An Act the title whereof begins with the words,—An Act for the more speedy judgment,—and ends with the words,—in cases of bankruptcy.	Sections four, eight, and nine.
1 Will. 4. c. 21	Prohibition and Mandamus Act 1831	An Act to improve the proceedings in Prohibition and on Writs of Mandamus.	Section six.
2 & 3 Will. 4. c. 33	Service of Process out of the Jurisdiction (England and Ireland) Act 1832	An Act to effectuate the service of process issuing from the Courts of Chancery and Exchequer in England and Ireland respectively.	Sections nine and eleven, the words "of England," "England or," and "respectively" in Section three.
3 & 4 Will. 4. c. 42	Civil Procedure Act 1833	An Act for the further amendment of the Law and the better advancement of Justice.	Sections twenty-three, twenty-four, and twenty-five, except as far as these sections may be in force as regards any court other than the Supreme Court of Judicature in England.
5 Vict. c. 5	Court of Chancery Act 1841	An Act to make further provisions for the administration of justice.	In section five the words "in the form set out in the first schedule to this Act," section six, and the first schedule.
5 & 6 Vict. c. 54	Tithe Act 1842	An Act the title whereof begins with the words,—An Act to amend,—and ends with the words,—time to be limited.	Section seventeen.
6 & 7 Vict. c. 67	Writs of Mandamus Act 1843	An Act to enable parties to sue out and prosecute Writs of Error in certain cases on the proceedings on Writs of Mandamus.	Section one, from "and it shall be lawful," to end of section, and section two.
12 & 13 Vict. c. 96	Admiralty Offences (Colonial) Act 1849	The Admiralty Offences Colonial Act, 1849.	Section five, from "and the word 'governor'" to end of section.
13 & 14 Vict. c. 35	Court of Chancery (England) Act 1850	An Act to diminish the delay and expense of proceedings in the High Court of Chancery in England.	Except sections nineteen to twenty-five.
15 & 16 Vict. c. 80	Master in Chancery Abolition Act 1852	An Act to abolish the office of Master in Ordinary of the High Court of Chancery, and to make provision for the more speedy and efficient dispatch of business in the said Court.	In section fifteen the words "and enrolled," section twenty-one from "but subject," and sections fifty-three and fifty-six.
15 & 16 Vict. c. 86	Court of Chancery Procedure Act 1852	An Act to amend the practice and course of proceeding in the High Court of Chancery.	Sections one to ten, twelve to twenty-one, twenty-six to thirty, thirty-six, thirty-seven, forty-nine, fifty-one, fifty-two, and fifty-three, fifty-eight to sixty-two, and schedule.
15 & 16 Vict. c. 87	Suitors in Chancery Relief Act 1852	An Act for the relief of the suitors of the High Court of Chancery.	Section four.
17 & 18 Vict. c. 78	Admiralty Court Act 1854	An Act to appoint persons to administer oaths, and to substitute stamps in lieu of fees, and for other purposes, in the High Court of Admiralty of England.	Section five.
17 & 18 Vict. c. 82	Court of Chancery of Lancaster Act 1854	An Act further to improve the administration of justice in the Court of Chancery of the County Palatine of Lancaster.	Sections two to five.
18 & 19 Vict. c. 45	Commissions of Assize in County Palatine of Lancaster Act 1855	An Act for further assimilating the practice in the Court Palatine of Lancaster to that of other counties with respect to the trial of issues from the Court of Chancery.	The whole act.
18 & 19 Vict. c. 90	Crown Suits Act 1855	An Act the title whereof begins with the words, "An Act for the payment of costs," and ends with the words, "Court of Exchequer".	In section three the words "for the Barons of Her Majesty's Court of Exchequer in England, or any three of them," and "and also."
19 & 20 Vict. c. 86	Cursitor Baron of the Exchequer Act 1856	An Act to abolish the office of Cursitor Baron of the Exchequer.	The whole act.
19 & 20 Vict. c. 113	Foreign Tribunals Evidence Act 1856	An Act to provide for taking evidence in Her Majesty's Dominions in relation to civil and commercial matters pending before foreign tribunals.	Section six, from "Provided" to the end of the section.
20 & 21 Vict. c. 77	Court of Probate Act 1857	An Act to amend the law relating to probates and letters of administration in England.	Sections five, six, nine, twelve, twenty-five, forty, forty-one, and forty-five.
21 & 22 Vict. c. 27	Chancery Amendment Act 1858	An Act to amend the course of procedure in the High Court of Chancery, the Court of Chancery in Ireland, and the Court of Chancery of the County Palatine of Lancaster.	Sections three, four, six, and seven.
21 & 22 Vict. c. 95	Court of Probate Act 1858	An Act to amend the Act of the twentieth and twenty-first Victoria, chapter seventy-seven.	Sections one and two, section six from "and from and after," to end of section, section thirty-one, and Schedule.
22 & 23 Vict. c. 6	High Court of Admiralty Act 1859	An Act to enable Serjeants, Barristers-at-Law, Attorneys, and Solicitors to practise in the High Court of Admiralty.	The whole act.
22 & 23 Vict. c. 21	Queen's Remembrancer Act 1859	An Act to regulate the office of Queen's Remembrancer, and to amend the practice and procedure on the Revenue side of the Court of Exchequer.	Sections nine, ten, eleven, eighteen, nineteen, twenty, twenty-two, twenty-six, and twenty-seven.
22 & 23 Vict. c. 59	Railway Companies Arbitration Act 1859	Railway Companies Arbitration Act, 1859.	In section twenty-six, the words, "and where requisite frame" for the purpose.
23 & 24 Vict. c. 34	Petitions of Right Act 1860	The Petitions of Right Act, 1860.	Section fifteen.
23 & 24 Vict. c. 54	Court of Queen's Bench Act Amendment Act	An Act to amend an Act for abolishing certain offices on the Crown side of the Court of Queen's Bench, and for regulating the Crown Office.	The whole act.
23 & 24 Vict. c. 127	Solicitors Act 1860	An Act to amend the laws relating to Attorneys, Solicitors, Proctors, and Certificated Conveyancers.	Section twenty-five.
24 & 25 Vict. c. 10	Admiralty Court Act 1861	The Admiralty Court Act, 1861.	Sections fourteen, fifteen, seventeen, nineteen, twenty, twenty-two, and thirty-two.
25 & 26 Vict. c. 42	Chancery Regulation Act 1862	The Chancery Regulation Act, 1862.	Except as far as it may be in force with respect to the Court of Chancery of the County Palatine of Lancaster.
25 & 26 Vict. c. 67	Declaration of Title Act 1862	The Declaration of Title Act, 1862.	Sections forty and forty-one, section forty-two, from "and every such" to end of section, and the words "all general rules and orders made as aforesaid including" in section forty-three.
25 & 26 Vict. c. 89	Companies Act 1862	The Companies Act, 1862.	In section thirty-five the words "if a court of common law," and the words "on a writ of error or appeal in the manner directed by 'The Common Law Procedure Act, 1854,' shall lie"; Section one hundred and seventy.
26 & 27 Vict. c. 122	Power to Alter the Circuits of Judges Act 1863	An Act to enable Her Majesty in Council to make alterations in the Circuits of the Judges.	Section three.
28 & 29 Vict. c. 104	Crown Suits, &c. Act 1865	The Crown Suits, &c. Act, 1865.	Sections twenty-six, twenty-eight, and thirty, section fifty-eight, from "and such judgment" to end of section, sections sixty and sixty-two, and section sixty-three from "on general rules" to end of section.
30 & 31 Vict. c. 64	Court of Appeal in Chancery Act 1867	An Act to make further provision for the dispatch of Business in the Court of Appeal in Chancery.	The whole act.
30 & 31 Vict. c. 68	Common Law Chambers Act 1867	An Act to provide for the better dispatch of Business in the Chambers of the Judges of the Supreme Court of Common Law.	The whole act.
30 & 31 Vict. c. 87	Court of Chancery (Officers) Act 1867	The Court of Chancery (Officers) Act, 1867.	Sections one and five.
30 & 31 Vict. c. 131	Companies Act 1867	The Companies Act, 1867.	In section twenty, the words "one hundred and seventieth."
31 & 32 Vict. c. 11	Court of Appeal in Chancery Act 1868	An Act to amend an Act to make further provision for the despatch of Business in the Court of Appeal in Chancery.	The whole act.
31 & 32 Vict. c. 40	Partition Act 1868	The Partition Act, 1868.	Section eleven.
31 & 32 Vict. c. 54	Judgments Extension Act 1868	The Judgments Extension Act, 1868.	In section seven, the words "Westminster and," and "England and," and the words "respectively" wherever it occurs.
33 & 34 Vict. c. 6	Judges Jurisdiction Act 1870	An Act to extend the jurisdiction of the Judges of the Superior Courts of Common Law at Westminster.	The whole act.
43 & 44 Vict. c. 19	Taxes Management Act 1880	The Trust Management Act, 1859.	In sub-section (2) (b.), the words "and all such orders shall be final and conclusive"; in sub-section (2) (d.) of the same section, the words "of the High Court" after the word "orders;" subsection (2) (e.) of the same section; and in subsection (3) of the same section the words "therein referred to."

== See also ==
- Statute Law Revision Act
