= Court of Chancery of the County Palatine of Lancaster =

Former English court of equity

The Court of Chancery of the County Palatine of Lancaster was a court of chancery that exercised jurisdiction within the County Palatine of Lancaster until it was merged with the High Court and abolished in 1972.

== Constitution ==
By a charter of Edward III dated the 6 March 1351, there was granted for life to Henry, Duke of Lancaster (inter alia), a court of chancery, a chancellor, and such other jura regalia in the county of Lancaster as pertained to a count palatine. On 28 February 1377, a similar charter was granted for the term of his life to John, King of Castile and Leon, Duke of Lancaster. On 16 February 1390, Richard II by charter granted these jura regalia to the Duke of Lancaster and his heirs male. Henry IV on his accession by a charter of the 14 October 1399, declared that these jura regalia were not to be changed by the King's accession and severed the Duchy from the Crown, the reason being that he had the Duchy by a sure and indefeasible title, but specially because his title to the Crown was not so assured, as the right to the Crown was in the heir of Lionel, Duke of Clarence, second son of Edward III. From that time the county palatine of Lancaster remained in the possession of the Sovereign as an inheritance separate from the Crown.

The county palatine of Lancaster under these charters had a court called the Court of Chancery of Lancaster, which was by 1909 regulated by a number of statutes, and also an Attorney General of the County Palatine and Duchy of Lancaster.

== Jurisdiction and appeals ==
=== Jurisdiction ===
The Court of Chancery of Lancaster had within the county palatine the like powers and jurisdiction as the High Court of Justice in its Chancery Division. The jurisdiction was thus unlimited in amount, although limited in area. The jurisdiction was concurrent with that of the High Court of Justice, and depended upon the existence within the jurisdiction of the persons, though not of the property, in question. If, however, any action was commenced in the palatine court which was not within the ancient chancery jurisdiction of the court, and would not if commenced in the High Court be assigned to the Chancery Division, it could be transferred to the High Court by Chancery Court of Lancaster or the Court of Appeal.

This court also possessed the summary jurisdiction of the Chancery Division, the statutory jurisdiction as to the property of infants and other persons under disability, power to administer assets, as well as jurisdiction under the Conveyancing and Law of Property Act 1881 (44 & 45 Vict. c. 41), the Trustee Act 1893 (56 & 57 Vict. c. 53), and the Judicial Trustee Act 1896 (59 & 60 Vict. c. 35), and as to money paid into court under the Lands Clauses Consolidation Act 1845 (8 & 9 Vict. c. 18).

=== Juries ===
The court had the power to direct that any question of fact arising in a suit or proceeding be tried by a special or common jury before the court itself, or to direct an issue to try any question of fact by a jury at the assizes.

=== Patents ===
The Chancery Court of Lancaster was not a court, nor was the Vice-Chancellor a judge, within the meaning of the Patents and Designs Act 1907 (7 Edw. 7. c. 29); the Vice-Chancellor had not power to grant a certificate that the validity of a patent came into question in an action for infringement so as to entitle the patentee to solicitor and client costs in a subsequent action for infringement unless the court otherwise directs.

=== Appeal ===
An appeal lay from this court to the Court of Appeal, and thence to the House of Lords.

== Judges ==
The Chancellor of the Duchy and County Palatine formerly exercised judicial functions. However, by 1909, the appointment was of a political nature, and carried with it as a rule a seat in the Cabinet. By 1909, the Vice-Chancellor, with the exception of certain interlocutory matters, performed all the judicial functions. He was appointed on the nomination of the Chancellor of the Duchy by letters patent from the Crown, which were expressed to be during pleasure, but in point of fact were quam diu se bene gesserit. Whenever the office of Chancellor of the Duchy and County Palatine of Lancaster became vacant, the Vice-Chancellor continued in office subject to the powers of the succeeding Chancellor.

== Procedure ==
=== Rules ===
The Chancellor of the Duchy and County Palatine had statutory powers to make rules of procedure subject to the approval of the authority for the time being empowered to make rules for the Supreme Court. Under these powers rules of procedure were made which assimilated the procedure of the Palatine Court to that of the High Court of Justice. Rules were also made under the Settled Estates Act 1877 (40 & 41 Vict. c. 18), the Settled Land Act 1882 (45 & 46 Vict. c. 38), and under the Trustee Act 1893 (56 & 57 Vict. c. 53). There were also rules dealing with court fees, solicitors' costs, suitors' fund and fee fund accounts. The Chancellor of the Duchy had power to make rules regulating proceedings under the Conveyancing and Law of Property Act 1881 (44 & 45 Vict. c. 41).

=== Party out of jurisdiction ===
In cases where any of the parties were out of the jurisdiction of the court the Court of Appeal could either direct the cause to be transferred to the High Court or service to be effected out of the jurisdiction. Where a decree or order of the court could not be enforced because the party to be bound thereby was out of the jurisdiction, it could be enforced by making it an order of the High Court.

The Vice-Chancellor had power to hear interlocutory matters out of the jurisdiction, but he could only hear causes out of the jurisdiction by consent.

== Officers ==
There was an Attorney-General of the County Palatine and Duchy of Lancaster. There were three district registrars of the Liverpool, Manchester and Preston districts respectively, with one assistant registrar at Liverpool and two at Manchester. The registrars were appointed by the Chancellor of the Duchy and County Palatine, and held office during his pleasure. The registrars in the Palatine Court performed the duties which the Masters of the Supreme Court (Chancery Division and Taxing Office), the Chancery Registrars, and the Clerks in the Central Office performed in the High Court.

There was also a comptroller, who was appointed by the Chancellor. His duties were to check receipts and payments of suitors' moneys.

The other officers were a seal-keeper and a cursitor.

== Other relevant legislation ==
The court was regulated by the following acts in particular:

Court of Chancery of Lancaster Act 1850 (Note: Section 25 of the Court of Chancery of Lancaster Act 1854 (17 & 18 Vict. c. 82).)
- Act of Parliament
- Parliament of the United Kingdom
- Long title: An Act to amend the Practice and Proceedings of the Court of Chancery of the County Palatine of Lancaster.
- Citation: 13 & 14 Vict. c. 43
- Territorial extent: United Kingdom

Dates
- Royal assent: 29 July 1850
- Commencement: 1 July 1850 (Note: Section 27.)
- Repealed: 1 January 1972

Other legislation
- Amended by: Court of Chancery of Lancaster Act 1854; Statute Law Revision Act 1875; Trustee Act 1893; Land Charges Act 1925
- Repealed by: Courts Act 1971

Status: Repealed

Text of statute as originally enacted

Court of Chancery of Lancaster Act 1854 (Note: Section 25.)
- Act of Parliament
- Parliament of the United Kingdom
- Long title: An Act further to improve the Administration of Justice in the Court of Chancery of the County Palatine of Lancaster.
- Citation: 17 & 18 Vict. c. 82
- Territorial extent: United Kingdom

Dates
- Royal assent: 7 August 1854
- Commencement: 7 August 1854 (Note: The Acts of Parliament (Commencement) Act 1793.)
- Repealed: 1 January 1972

Other legislation
- Amends: Court of Chancery of Lancaster Act 1850
- Amended by: Statute Law Revision and Civil Procedure Act 1881; Statute Law Revision Act 1950
- Repealed by: Courts Act 1971

Status: Repealed

Text of statute as originally enacted

Chancery of Lancaster Act 1890 (Note: Section 1.)
- Act of Parliament
- Parliament of the United Kingdom
- Long title: An Act to further improve the Administration of Justice in the Court of Chancery of the County Palatine of Lancaster.
- Citation: 53 & 54 Vict. c. 23
- Territorial extent: United Kingdom

Dates
- Royal assent: 25 July 1890
- Commencement: 25 July 18904
- Repealed: 1 January 1972

Other legislation
- Amended by: Supreme Court of Judicature (Consolidation) Act 1925
- Repealed by: Courts Act 1971

Status: Repealed

Text of statute as originally enacted

Court of Chancery of Lancaster Act 1952 (Note: Section 5.)
- Act of Parliament
- Parliament of the United Kingdom
- Long title: An Act to permit the transfer of proceedings from the High Court of Justice to the Court of Chancery of the County Palatine of Lancaster.
- Citation: 15 & 16 Geo. 6 & 1 Eliz. 2. c. 49
- Territorial extent: United Kingdom

Dates
- Royal assent: 1 August 1952
- Commencement: 1 August 1952
- Repealed: 1 January 1972

Other legislation
- Amended by: Court of Chancery of Lancaster (Amendment) Act 1961
- Repealed by: Courts Act 1971

Status: Repealed

Text of statute as originally enacted

Court of Chancery of Lancaster (Amendment) Act 1961 (Note: Section 2.)
- Act of Parliament
- Parliament of the United Kingdom
- Long title: An Act to amend the Court of Chancery of Lancaster Act, 1952.
- Citation: 9 & 10 Eliz. 2. c. 38
- Territorial extent: United Kingdom

Dates
- Royal assent: 19 July 1961
- Commencement: 19 July 1961
- Repealed: 1 January 1972

Other legislation
- Amends: Court of Chancery of Lancaster Act 1952
- Repealed by: Courts Act 1971

Status: Repealed

Text of statute as originally enacted

- The Court of Chancery of Lancaster Act 1850 (13 & 14 Vict. c. 43)
- The Court of Chancery of Lancaster Act 1854 (17 & 18 Vict. c. 82)
- The Chancery of Lancaster Act 1890 (53 & 54 Vict. c. 23)
- The Court of Chancery of Lancaster Act 1952 (15 & 16 Geo. 6 & 1 Eliz. 2. c. 49)
- The Court of Chancery of Lancaster (Amendment) Act 1961 (9 & 10 Eliz. 2. c. 38)

All of these acts were repealed by section 56 of, and schedule 11 to, the Courts Act 1971.

=== Funds in court ===
Section 52 of the Administration of Justice Act 1956 provided:

- (1) Any funds for the time being held in the joint names of the Clerk of the Council of the Duchy of Lancaster, the registrar of any district of the Court of Chancery of the County Palatine of Lancaster and the Comptroller of the said court, being funds held in trust for any charity subject to the jurisdiction of the Charity Commissioners or of the Minister of Education, or in trust for any ecclesiastical corporation in the Church of England may, if the Vice-Chancellor, on an application made in that behalf to the registrar, as the case may be, either by the Charity Commissioners or the Church Commissioners, thinks fit so to direct, be transferred to the official trustees of charitable funds or the Church Commissioners respectively in trust for the charity or ecclesiastical corporation upon the trusts upon which the funds were held before the transfer.
- (2) Notwithstanding anything in the enactments relating to the said court or in any rule or order made thereunder, no fees shall be payable under those Acts or any such rule or order in respect of a transfer of funds made under this section.
- (3) In this section—
  - "ecclesiastical corporation" means any ecclesiastical corporation within the meaning of the Episcopal and Capitular Estates Act, 1851, and includes the incumbent of a benefice;
  - "benefice" means a benefice with or without cure of souls, and includes rectories and vicarages, perpetual curacies and endowed public chapels, parochial chapelries and chapelries or districts belonging or reputed to belong, or annexed or reputed to be annexed, to any church or chapel.

=== Evidence of foreign law ===
See sections 4(2) and 4(4)(a) and (b) of the Civil Evidence Act 1972.

=== Reciprocal enforcement of foreign judgments ===
See:

- article 2(1)(a) of the convention set out in the Schedule to the Reciprocal Enforcement of Foreign Judgments (Israel) Order 1971 (SI 1971/1039).
- article 2(1)(a) of the convention set out in the Schedule to the Reciprocal Enforcement of Foreign Judgments (the Netherlands) Order 1969 (SI 1969/1063)
- article 2(1)(a) of the convention set out in the Schedule to the Reciprocal Enforcement of Foreign Judgments (Norway) Order 1962 (SI 1962/636)

=== Power to authorise superior landlord to enter and execute works ===
See section 30(3) of the Housing, Town Planning, &c. Act 1919.

=== Power of court to authorise examination of works on unfit premises or for improvement ===
See section 164(3) of the Housing Act 1957.

=== Land Charges Act 1925 ===
See section 20(2) of the Land Charges Act 1925.

== Merger with the High Court ==
On the appointed day the Court of Chancery of the County Palatine of Lancaster was merged with the High Court. Accordingly, on and after that day no jurisdiction, whether conferred by statute or otherwise, could be exercised, or can now be exercised, by the Court of Chancery of the County Palatine of Lancaster as such. The Court of Chancery of the County Palatine of Lancaster was abolished on merger with the High Court.

=== Transitional provisions ===
Transitional provisions were contained in Part I of Schedule 5 to the Courts Act 1971.

=== Offices ===
Any judicial or other office in the Court of Chancery of the County Palatine of Lancaster, other than the office of Vice-Chancellor of the County Palatine of Lancaster, was abolished by section 44(1)(b) of the Courts Act 1971.

Section 44(2) conferred a power to make regulations to provide for the compensation of persons who suffered loss of employment or loss or diminution of emoluments attributable to the effect of section 44(1)(b) or to the merger of the Court of Chancery of the County Palatine of Lancaster.
