= Supreme Court of Judicature Act =

Stock short title used for legislation

Supreme Court of Judicature Act (with its variations) is a stock short title which was formerly used for legislation in the United Kingdom relating to the Supreme Court of Judicature for England and Wales and the court of the same name for Ireland.

The Bill for an Act with this short title may have been known as a Supreme Court of Judicature Bill, or as a Judicature Bill during its passage through Parliament.

These Acts have since been superseded for Northern Ireland by the Judicature (Northern Ireland) Act 1978 (c. 23) and for England and Wales by the Supreme Court Act 1981 (c. 54) (now renamed as the Senior Courts Act 1981).

== List ==
=== England and Wales ===
- The Supreme Court of Judicature Act 1873 (36 & 37 Vict. c. 66)
- The Supreme Court of Judicature Act 1875 (38 & 39 Vict. c. 77)
- The Supreme Court of Judicature Act 1877 (40 & 41 Vict. c. 9)
- The Supreme Court of Judicature (Officers) Act 1879 (42 & 43 Vict. c. 78)
- The Supreme Court of Judicature Act 1881 (44 & 45 Vict. c. 68)
- The Supreme Court of Judicature Act 1884 (47 & 48 Vict. c. 61)
- The Supreme Court of Judicature Act 1890 (53 & 54 Vict. c. 44)
- The Supreme Court of Judicature (London Clauses) Act 1891 (54 & 55 Vict. c. 14)
- The Supreme Court of Judicature Act 1891 (54 & 55 Vict. c. 53)
- The Supreme Court of Judicature (Procedure) Act 1894 (57 & 58 Vict. c. 16)
- The Supreme Court of Judicature Act 1899 (62 & 63 Vict. c. 6)
- The Supreme Court of Judicature Act 1902 (2 Edw. 7. c. 31)
- The Supreme Court of Judicature Act 1910 (10 Edw. 7 & 1 Geo. 5. c. 12)
- The Supreme Court of Judicature (Consolidation) Act 1925 (15 & 16 Geo. 5. c. 49)
- The Supreme Court of Judicature (Amendment) Act 1935 (25 & 26 Geo. 5. c. 2)
- The Supreme Court of Judicature (Amendment) Act 1937 (1 & 2 Geo. 6. c. 2)
- The Supreme Court of Judicature (Amendment) Act 1938 (1 & 2 Geo. 6. c. 67)
- The Supreme Court of Judicature (Amendment) Act 1944 (7 & 8 Geo. 6. c. 9)
- The Supreme Court of Judicature (Circuit Officers) Act 1946 (9 & 10 Geo. 6. c. 78)
- The Supreme Court of Judicature (Amendment) Act 1948 (11 & 12 Geo. 6. c. 20)
- The Supreme Court of Judicature (Amendment) Act 1959 (7 & 8 Eliz. 2. c. 39)

=== Ireland ===
- The Supreme Court of Judicature Act (Ireland) 1877 (40 & 41 Vict. c. 57)
- The Supreme Court of Judicature Act (Ireland) 1877 Amendment Act 1878 (41 & 42 Vict. c. 27)
- The Supreme Court of Judicature (Ireland) Act 1882 (45 & 46 Vict. c. 70)
- The Supreme Court of Judicature (Ireland) Act 1887 (50 & 51 Vict. c. 6)
- The Supreme Court of Judicature (Ireland) Amendment Act 1888 (51 & 52 Vict. c. 27)
- The Supreme Court of Judicature (Ireland) Act 1897 (60 & 61 Vict. c. 17)
- The Supreme Court of Judicature (Ireland) (No. 2) Act 1897 (60 & 61 Vict. c. 66)
- The Supreme Court of Judicature (Ireland) Act 1907 (7 Edw. 7. c. 44)

== See also ==
- Appellate Jurisdiction Act
- Judicature Act
- List of short titles
