= Court of Appeal judge (England and Wales) =

Ordinary judge of the Court of Appeal of England and Wales

A lord justice of appeal or lady justice of appeal is a judge of the Court of Appeal of England and Wales, the court that hears appeals from the High Court of Justice, the Crown Court and other courts and tribunals. A lord (or lady) justice of appeal is the second highest level of judge in the courts of England and Wales. Despite the title, and unlike the former lords of appeal in ordinary (who were judges of still higher rank), they are not peers.

== Appointment ==
The number of lord justices of appeal was fixed at five by the Supreme Court of Judicature Act, 1881, but has since been increased. Judges of the Court of Appeal of England and Wales are selected from the ranks of senior judges, in practice High Court judges with lengthy experience, appointed by the monarch on the recommendation of the prime minister.

== Jurisdiction ==
Applications for permission to appeal a ruling of an inferior court (usually from the Crown Court in criminal matters and the High Court of Justice in civil matters but in some instances from a County Court) are heard by a single lord or lady justice of appeal. A full appeal is heard by three Court of Appeal judges in the Civil Division. In the Criminal Division, a single judge hears appeals against conviction with two other judges of the Court of Appeal Criminal Division (typically, two High Court judges, or one High Court judge and one senior circuit judge). Appeals against sentence may be heard by a single Court of Appeal judge with another judge, or by two High Court judges.

== Title and form of address ==
In court, a lord justice of appeal is addressed as "My Lord" or "Your Lordship", and a lady justice of appeal is referred to as "My Lady" or "Your Ladyship". The style of "lord justice of appeal" was prescribed by the Supreme Court of Judicature Act 1877, but the term "lady justice" was used in practice by women soon after they were promoted to sit as judges of the Court of Appeal, and the term was included in the Courts Act 2003. When there is already or has until recently been a judge with the same surname as a new appointee, the new judge will often use a first name as part of his or her judicial title. Many judges have done this, such as Lord Justice Lawrence Collins (Sir Lawrence Antony Collins).

When referring to a lord or lady justice of appeal in a legal context, the judge is identified by use of the surname (or first name and surname if appropriate), followed by the letters "LJ". For example, Lord Justice Bloggs or Lady Justice Bloggs would be referred to as "Bloggs LJ". Where several judges are listed the double letters 'LJJ' are used; for example, "Bloggs, Smith and Jones LJJ".

A knighthood is granted to a man upon appointment to the High Court, usually made a Knight Bachelor; by convention, a woman on appointment to the High Court becomes a Dame Commander of the Most Excellent Order of the British Empire (DBE). By convention judges of the Court of Appeal are sworn of the Privy Council, entitling them to the honorific "The Right Honourable".

== Court dress ==
Formerly, in all instances in court, a Court of Appeal judge's apparel consisted of a black silk gown, court coat or waistcoat and a short bench wig. In cases heard by the Court of Appeal Criminal Division, this remains the court dress. In cases heard in the Civil Division, judges wear a one-piece, zip-up robe onto which are stitched vertical, gold, clerical bands and no wig. These bands are red for High Court judges, pink for High Court Masters and Insolvency and Companies Court Judges, and blue for District Judges. On ceremonial occasions more elaborate robes and wigs are worn.

== See also ==
- List of judges of the Court of Appeal of England and Wales
