= Judicature Act =

Stock short title used for UK legislation

Judicature Act is a term which was used in the United Kingdom for legislation which related to the Supreme Court of Judicature.

== List ==
=== United Kingdom ===
- The Supreme Court of Judicature Act 1873 (36 & 37 Vict. c. 66)
- The Supreme Court of Judicature Act 1875 (38 & 39 Vict. c. 77)
- The Appellate Jurisdiction Act 1876 (39 & 40 Vict. c. 59)
- The Supreme Court of Judicature Act 1877 (40 & 41 Vict. c. 9)
- The Supreme Court of Judicature (Officers) Act 1879 (42 & 43 Vict. c. 78)
- The Supreme Court of Judicature Act 1881 (44 & 45 Vict. c. 68)
- The Supreme Court of Judicature Act 1884 (47 & 48 Vict. c. 61)
- The Appellate Jurisdiction Act 1887 (50 & 51 Vict. c. 70)
- The Supreme Court of Judicature Act 1890 (53 & 54 Vict. c. 44)
- The Supreme Court of Judicature (London Clauses) Act 1891 (54 & 55 Vict. c. 14)
- The Supreme Court of Judicature Act 1891 (54 & 55 Vict. c. 53)
- The Supreme Court of Judicature (Procedure) Act 1894 (57 & 58 Vict. c. 16)

=== The Judicature Acts ===
The Judicature Acts 1873 to 1894 means the statutes listed above.

Section 2 of the Supreme Court of Judicature Act 1899 provided that that act could be cited as the Judicature Acts 1873 to 1894.

Section 2 of the Supreme Court of Judicature Act 1902 provided that that act could be cited as the Judicature Acts 1873 to 1894.

Judicature Acts 1873 to 1910 was the collective title of the Judicature Acts 1873 to 1902, the Judicature (Rule Committee) Act 1909 (9 Edw. 7. c. 11) and the Supreme Court of Judicature Act 1910 (10 Edw. 7 & 1 Geo. 5. c. 12).

=== Ireland ===
- The Supreme Court of Judicature Act (Ireland) 1877 (40 & 41 Vict. c. 57)
- The Supreme Court of Judicature Act (Ireland) 1877 Amendment Act 1878 (41 & 42 Vict. c. 27)
- The Supreme Court of Judicature (Ireland) Act 1882 (45 & 46 Vict. c. 70)
- The Supreme Court of Judicature (Ireland) Act 1887 (50 & 51 Vict. c. 6)
- The Supreme Court of Judicature (Ireland) Amendment Act 1888 (51 & 52 Vict. c. 27)

==== The Judicature (Ireland) Acts ====
The Judicature (Ireland) Acts 1877 to 1888 means the statutes listed above.

=== Northern Ireland ===
- The Judicature (Northern Ireland) Act 1978 (c. 23)

== See also ==
- List of short titles
- Appellate Jurisdiction Act
- Supreme Court of Judicature Act
- Judicature Acts
