= Administration of Justice Act 1965 =

Act of the Parliament of the United Kingdom

Administration of Justice Act 1965 (Note: Section 36(1).)
- Act of Parliament
- Parliament of the United Kingdom
- Long title: An Act to enable common investment funds to be established for the investment of moneys in certain courts in England, Wales and Northern Ireland and certain other moneys; to make fresh provision for dealing with funds in the Supreme Court of Judicature in England and to amend the law concerning dealing with funds in county courts in England and Wales or in the Mayor's and City of London Court; to amend the law concerning giving security by way of making a deposit with the Accountant General of the Supreme Court of Judicature in England; to make miscellaneous amendments of the law relating to that court and to inferior courts in England and Wales; to amend section 8 of the Prosecution of Offences Act 1879; to enable benefits under section 10 of the Courts of Justice Concentration (Site) Act 1865 to be commuted into capital sums; to amend the War Pensions (Administrative Provisions) Act 1919; to enlarge the legislative power of the Parliament of Northern Ireland and amend the Criminal Appeal (Northern Ireland) Act 1930; to repeal certain obsolete, spent, unnecessary or superseded enactments; and for purposes connected with the matters aforesaid.
- Citation: 1965 c. 2
- Territorial extent: United Kingdom

Dates
- Royal assent: 23 March 1965
- Commencement: 27 April 1965 (Note: Section 36(2). The Administration of Justice Act 1965 (Commencement No. 1) Order 1965 (SI 1965/706).); 1 October 1965 (Note: Section 36(2). The Administration of Justice Act 1965 (Commencement No. 2) Order 1965 (SI 1965/1466).)
Other legislation
Amends	Defence Act 1842; Light Railways Act 1896; Deeds of Arrangement Act 1914; Mines (Working Facilities and Support) Act 1923; Mines (Working Facilities and Support) Act 1925; Mining Industry Act 1926; See § Repealed enactments
Amended by	Mines (Working Facilities and Support) Act 1966; National Loans Act 1968; Law Reform (Miscellaneous Provisions) Act 1971; Road Traffic Act 1972; Statute Law (Repeals) Act 1974; Statute Law (Repeals) Act 1977; Administration of Justice Act 1977; Judicature (Northern Ireland) Act 1978; Prosecution of Offences Act 1979; Statute Law (Repeals) Act 1981; Judicial Pensions Act 1981; Senior Courts Act 1981; Civil Jurisdiction and Judgments Act 1982; Administration of Justice Act 1982; Mental Health Act 1983; County Courts Act 1984; Statute Law (Repeals) Act 1993; Statute Law (Repeals) Act 2004; Constitutional Reform Act 2005; Deregulation Act 2015; Statute Law (Repeals) Measure 2018

Status: Partially repealed

Text of statute as originally enacted

Revised text of statute as amended

Text of the Administration of Justice Act 1965 as in force today (including any amendments) within the United Kingdom, from legislation.gov.uk.

The Administration of Justice Act 1965 (c. 2) is an act of the Parliament of the United Kingdom that made provision for common investment funds for moneys in court and amended various enactments relating to the administration of justice in England and Wales and Northern Ireland.

== Provisions ==
=== Repealed enactments ===
Section 36(4) of the act repealed 9 enactments, listed in the third schedule to the act.

Citation	Short title	Extent of repeal
42 & 43 Vict. c. 22	Prosecution of Offences Act 1879	In section 8, the words from " The draft" onwards.
15 & 16 Geo. 5. c. 19	Trustee Act 1925	In section 63(1), the words from " and the same shall" onwards.
15 & 16 Geo. 5. c. 49	Supreme Court of Judicature (Consolidation) Act 1925	Section 133(4) to (6).
15 & 16 Geo. 5. c. 49	Supreme Court of Judicature (Consolidation) Act 1925	Section 134.
15 & 16 Geo. 5. c. 49	Supreme Court of Judicature (Consolidation) Act 1925	In section 135, the words " subject to the provisions of this Part of this Act and of the rules " and the words from " so however " to " Supreme Court".
15 & 16 Geo. 5. c. 49	Supreme Court of Judicature (Consolidation) Act 1925	Sections 136 to 147.
15 & 16 Geo. 5. c. 49	Supreme Court of Judicature (Consolidation) Act 1925	Section 149.
15 & 16 Geo. 5. c. 49	Supreme Court of Judicature (Consolidation) Act 1925	In Schedule 1, the entry relating to the Exchequer Court Act 1842, in the entry relating to the Common Law Procedure Act 1852, the words " one hundred and twenty-seven ", in the entry relating to the Summary Jurisdiction Act 1857, the words " two, three" and the words " and eleven ", and, in the entry relating to the Supreme Court of Judicature Act 1873, the word " forty-six ".
18 & 19 Geo. 5. c. 26	Administration of Justice Act 1928	In section 15(1), the words " for and on behalf of the Supreme Court".
18 & 19 Geo. 5. c. 26	Administration of Justice Act 1928	In Schedule 1, in Part I, in the last entry, the words " two, three" and the words " and eleven ".
26 Geo. 5 & 1 Edw. 8. c. 34	Finance Act 1936	Section 32.
12, 13 & 14 Geo. 6. c. 67	Civil Aviation Act 1949	In section 43(3) and (6)(a), the words " for and on behalf of that court".
7 & 8 Eliz. 2. c. 22	County Courts Act 1959	In section 120(3), the words from " and when " onwards.
7 & 8 Eliz. 2. c. 22	County Courts Act 1959	Section 134(1).
7 & 8 Eliz. 2. c. 22	County Courts Act 1959	In section 169, the words " and the Commissioners ".
7 & 8 Eliz. 2. c. 22	County Courts Act 1959	Section 171.
7 & 8 Eliz. 2. c. 22	County Courts Act 1959	Section 174(3).
7 & 8 Eliz. 2. c. 22	County Courts Act 1959	In section 175, the words " Section sixty-three of the Trustee Act 1925 and ".
7 & 8 Eliz. 2. c. 22	County Courts Act 1959	In section 176, the definitions of " money in court " and " securities in court".
7 & 8 Eliz. 2. c. 72	Mental Health Act 1959	In Schedule 7, in Part I, in the entry relating to the Supreme Court of Judicature (Consolidation) Act 1925, the words " In section one hundred and forty-nine, for the words ' the Lord Chancellor and any person exercising the powers of the judge in lunacy' there shall be substituted the words ' the authority having jurisdiction under Part VIII of the Mental Health Act 1959 ' ".
8 & 9 Eliz. 2. c. 16	Road Traffic Act 1960	In section 202(1), the words " for and on behalf of the Supreme Court".
8 & 9 Eliz. 2. c. 16	Road Traffic Act 1960	In section 204(2), the words " for and on behalf of the Supreme Court".

Section 34(1) of the act provided that 70 enactments should cease to have effect, listed in the second schedule to the act.

Citation	Short title	Description	Extent to which enactment is to cease to have effect
31 Eliz. 1. c. 11	Forcible Entry Act 1588	The Forcible Entry Act 1588.	The words " coste and " wherever occurring.
21 Jas. 1. c. 3	Statute of Monopolies	The Statute of Monopolies.	In section 4, the words " and in double coste ".
21 Jas. 1. c. 3	Statute of Monopolies	The Statute of Monopolies.	Section 8.
16 & 17 Car. 2. c. 5	Execution Act 1664	The Execution Act 1664.	The whole act.
2 Will. & Mary. c. 5	Distress for Rent Act 1689	The Distress for Rent Act 1689.	In section 3, the words " and costs of suite ".
2 Will. & Mary. c. 5	Distress for Rent Act 1689	The Distress for Rent Act 1689.	In section 4, the words " together with full costs of suite ".
8 & 9 Will. 3. c. 20	Bank of England Act 1696	The Bank of England Act 1696.	Section 46.
4 & 5 Anne. c. 3	Administration of Justice Act 1705	The Administration of Justice Act 1705.	The whole act.
13 Anne. c. 13	Presentation of Benefices Act 1713	The Presentation of Benefices Act 1713.	In section 4, the words from " Provided that " onwards.
24 Geo. 2. c. 40	Sale of Spirits Act 1750	The Sale of Spirits Act 1750.	The whole act.
25 Geo. 2. c. 36	Disorderly Houses Act 1751	The Disorderly Houses Act 1751.	Sections 5 to 7.
10 Geo. 3. c. 50	Parliamentary Privilege Act 1770	The Parliamentary Privilege Act 1770.	Section 5.
15 Geo. 3. c. 22	Supreme Court Buildings Act 1775	The Act for vesting part of the garden of the society of Lincoln's Inn, in the county of Middlesex, in the accountant general of the court of chancery, and his successors, for ever, for the purpose of erecting thereon offices for the accountant general, and for the register of the said cour.	The whole act.
15 Geo. 3. c. 56	Supreme Court Buildings (No. 2) Act 1775	The act for applying the funds provided for rebuilding the offices of the six clerks of the King's court of chancery, by an act, made in the fourteenth year of the reign of his present Majesty, intituled, An act for rebuilding the office of the six clerks of the King's court of chancery, and for erecting offices for the register and accountant-general of the said court, for the better preserving the records, decrees, orders, and books of account kept in such offices; in building offices for the said six clerks in the garden of Lincoln's Inn, instead of rebuilding the present six clerks office in Chancery Lane; and for other purpose.	The whole act.
19 Geo. 3. c. 70	Inferior Courts Act 1779	The Inferior Courts Act 1779.	The whole act.
41 Geo. 3 (U.K.) c. 63	House of Commons (Clergy Disqualification) Act 1801	The House of Commons (Clergy Disqualification) Act 1801.	In section 2, the words " with full costs of suit".
41 Geo. 3 (U.K.) c. 79	Public Notaries Act 1801	The Public Notaries Act 1801.	In section 16, the words " with full costs of suit".
52 Geo. 3. c. 11	House of Commons (Offices) Act 1812	The House of Commons (Offices) Act 1812.	In section 2, the words " the master of the rolls ".
57 Geo. 3. c. 19	Seditious Meetings Act 1817	The Seditious Meetings Act 1817.	In section 30, the words from " and the plaintiff " to " expences ".
58 Geo. 3. c. 30	Costs Act 1818	The Costs Act 1818.	The whole act.
58 Geo. 3. c. 70	Disorderly Houses Act 1818	The Disorderly Houses Act 1818.	The whole act.
7 & 8 Geo. 4. c. 71	Imprisonment for Debt Act 1827	The Imprisonment for Debt Act 1827.	The whole act.
9 Geo. 4. c. 66	Nautical Almanack Act 1828	The Nautical Almanack Act 1828.	In section 2, the words " with costs of suit ".
11 Geo. 4 & 1 Will. 4. c. 36	Contempt of Court Act 1830	The Contempt of Court Act 1830.	Section 18.
3 & 4 Will. 4. c. 42	Civil Procedure Act 1833	The Civil Procedure Act 1833.	The whole act.
1 & 2 Vict. c. 74	Small Tenements Recovery Act 1838	The Small Tenements Recovery Act 1838.	In section 6, the words " with costs of suit ".
1 & 2 Vict. c. 110	Judgments Act 1838	The Judgments Act 1838.	Section 22.
5 & 6 Vict. c. 32	Fines and Recoveries Act 1842	The Fines and Recoveries Act 1842.	The whole act.
5 & 6 Vict. c. 86	Exchequer Court Act 1842	The Exchequer Court Act 1842.	The whole act.
6 & 7 Vict. c. 86	London Hackney Carriages Act 1843	The London Hackney Carriages Act 1843.	In section 47, the words from " and if a verdict " onwards.
7 & 8 Vict. c. 22	Gold and Silver Wares Act 1844	The Gold and Silver Wares Act 1844.	In section 13, the words from " and if a verdict " onwards.
8 & 9 Vict. c. 18	Lands Clauses Consolidation Act 1845	The Lands Clauses Consolidation Act 1845.	In section 11 the words " with costs of suit by action of debt".
8 & 9 Vict. c. 18	Lands Clauses Consolidation Act 1845	The Lands Clauses Consolidation Act 1845.	In section 66 the words " be enforced by attachment, or " and the words " with costs by action or suit".
8 & 9 Vict. c. 18	Lands Clauses Consolidation Act 1845	The Lands Clauses Consolidation Act 1845.	In section 70 the words " on the petition " so far as they require an application to be made by petition.
8 & 9 Vict. c. 18	Lands Clauses Consolidation Act 1845	The Lands Clauses Consolidation Act 1845.	In section 74 the words " on the petition " so far as they require an application to be made by petition.
8 & 9 Vict. c. 18	Lands Clauses Consolidation Act 1845	The Lands Clauses Consolidation Act 1845.	In section 78 the words " by petition " and the words " in a summary way as to such court shall seem fit".
8 & 9 Vict. c. 18	Lands Clauses Consolidation Act 1845	The Lands Clauses Consolidation Act 1845.	In section 83 the words " upon petition in a summary way" and the words from " or the same " to " other cases of costs ".
8 & 9 Vict. c. 18	Lands Clauses Consolidation Act 1845	The Lands Clauses Consolidation Act 1845.	In section 89 the words " with costs, by action ".
8 & 9 Vict. c. 18	Lands Clauses Consolidation Act 1845	The Lands Clauses Consolidation Act 1845.	In section 107 the words " by an order to be made upon petition ".
8 & 9 Vict. c. 18	Lands Clauses Consolidation Act 1845	The Lands Clauses Consolidation Act 1845.	Section 126.
8 & 9 Vict. c. 18	Lands Clauses Consolidation Act 1845	The Lands Clauses Consolidation Act 1845.	In section 135 the words from " and if no such tender " onwards.
8 & 9 Vict. c. 127	Small Debts Act 1845	The Small Debts Act 1845.	Section 22.
12 & 13 Vict. c. 45	Quarter Sessions Act 1849	The Quarter Sessions Act 1849.	Section 11.
12 & 13 Vict. c. 109	Petty Bag Act 1849	The Petty Bag Act 1849.	Sections 30, 31 and 45.
15 & 16 Vict. c. 76	Common Law Procedure Act 1852	The Common Law Procedure Act 1852.	Sections 127, 213, 217, 219 and 220.
20 & 21 Vict. c. 43	Summary Jurisdiction Act 1857	The Summary Jurisdiction Act 1857.	Section 11.
20 & 21 Vict. c. 60	Irish Bankrupt and Insolvent Act 1857	The Irish Bankrupt and Insolvent Act 1857.	Sections 68, 341 and 342 and Schedule (B).
20 & 21 Vict. c. 77	Court of Probate Act 1857	The Court of Probate Act 1857.	Sections 116 and 117.
20 & 21 Vict. c. 79	Probates and Letters of Administration Act (Ireland) 1857	The Probates and Letters of Administration Act (Ireland) 1857.	In section 32, the words " all persons who at the commencement of this Act shall be acting as surrogates of any ecclesiastical court, and " and the word " other " (where first occurring).
20 & 21 Vict. c. 85	Matrimonial Causes Act 1857	The Matrimonial Causes Act 1857.	The whole act.
22 Vict. c. 25	Convict Prisons Abroad Act 1859	The Convict Prisons Abroad Act 1859.	The whole act.
23 & 24 Vict. c. 127	Solicitors Act 1860	The Solicitors Act 1860.	The whole act.
24 & 25 Vict. c. 10	Admiralty Court Act 1861	The Admiralty Court Act 1861.	Section 16.
25 & 26 Vict. c. 38	Sale of Spirits Act 1862	The Sale of Spirits Act 1862.	The whole act.
27 & 28 Vict. c. 44	Matrimonial Causes Act 1864	The Matrimonial Causes Act 1864.	The whole act.
27 & 28 Vict. c. 114	Improvement of Land Act 1864	The Improvement of Land Act 1864.	Section 22.
27 & 28 Vict. c. 114	Improvement of Land Act 1864	The Improvement of Land Act 1864.	In section 23, the words " and the mode in which such costs shall be settled or taxed", the words " in the discretion of the Court or judge who shall hear such application " and the words " the said costs shall".
28 & 29 Vict. c. 48	Courts of Justice Building Act 1865	The Courts of Justice Building Act 1865.	Section 23.
28 & 29 Vict. c. 49	Courts of Justice Concentration (Site) Act 1865	The Courts of Justice Concentration (Site) Act 1865.	The whole act except section 10.
29 & 30 Vict. c. 37	Hop (Prevention of Frauds) Act 1866	The Hop (Prevention of Frauds) Act 1866.	In section 15, the words from " and any plaintiff " onwards.
30 & 31 Vict. c. 122	Courts of Law (Fees) Act 1867	The Courts of Law (Fees) Act 1867.	The whole act.
34 & 35 Vict. c. 57	Courts of Justice (Additional Site) Act 1871	The Courts of Justice (Additional Site) Act 1871.	The whole act.
35 & 36 Vict. c. 86	Borough and Local Courts of Record Act 1872	The Borough and Local Courts of Record Act 1872.	In the Schedule, paragraph 9.
36 & 37 Vict. c. 66	Supreme Court of Judicature Act 1873	The Supreme Court of Judicature Act 1873.	Section 46.
39 & 40 Vict. c. 28	Court of Admiralty (Ireland) Amendment Act 1876	The Court of Admiralty (Ireland) Amendment Act 1876.	Section 13.
39 & 40 Vict. c. 59	Appellate Jurisdiction Act 1876	The Appellate Jurisdiction Act 1876.	In section 25, the words " or Ireland " and the words from " and the superior" to " Justice ".
42 & 43 Vict. c. 22	Prosecution of Offences Act 1879	The Prosecution of Offences Act 1879.	In section 9, the words from " and Her Majesty's Solicitor-General " onwards.
47 & 48 Vict. c. 54	Yorkshire Registries Act 1884	The Yorkshire Registries Act 1884.	Section 36.
47 & 48 Vict. c. 54	Yorkshire Registries Act 1884	The Yorkshire Registries Act 1884.	In section 37, the words from the beginning to " have effect".
47 & 48 Vict. c. 54	Yorkshire Registries Act 1884	The Yorkshire Registries Act 1884.	In section 38, the words from " or after any agreement " to " into effect".
47 & 48 Vict. c. 54	Yorkshire Registries Act 1884	The Yorkshire Registries Act 1884.	In section 40, the words from the beginning to " under this Act".
47 & 48 Vict. c. 54	Yorkshire Registries Act 1884	The Yorkshire Registries Act 1884.	In section 49, the words from the beginning to " have effect".
50 & 51 Vict. c. 6	Supreme Court of Judicature (Ireland) Act 1887	The Supreme Court of Judicature (Ireland) Act 1887.	Sections 1, 4 and 5.
54 & 55 Vict. c. 10	Middlesex Registry Act 1891	The Middlesex Registry Act 1891.	The whole act.
54 & 55 Vict. c. 64	Land Registry (Middlesex Deeds) Act 1891	The Land Registry (Middlesex Deeds) Act 1891.	Section 4.
55 & 56 Vict. c. 27	Parliamentary Deposits and Bonds Act 1892	The Parliamentary Deposits and Bonds Act 1892.	The whole act, except in so far as it has effect in relation to the Parliament of Northern Ireland.
57 & 58 Vict. c. 23	Commissioners of Works Act 1894	The Commissioners of Works Act 1894.	Section 1(3).
60 & 61 Vict. c. 66	Supreme Court of Judicature (Ireland) (No. 2) Act 1897	The Supreme Court of Judicature (Ireland) (No. 2) Act 1897.	Section 11.
14 & 15 Geo. 5. c. 17	County Courts Act 1924	The County Courts Act 1924.	In section 4(5), the words from " but in the case " onwards.
14 & 15 Geo. 5. c. 17	County Courts Act 1924	The County Courts Act 1924.	Section 5(4).
15 & 16 Geo. 5. c. 21	Land Registration Act 1925	The Land Registration Act 1925.	In section 137(3), the words " and of the Mortgage Debenture Act 1865 ".
15 & 16 Geo. 5. c. 49	Supreme Court of Judicature (Consolidation) Act 1925	The Supreme Court of Judicature (Consolidation) Act 1925.	Section 109A(2) to (4).
15 & 16 Geo. 5. c. 49	Supreme Court of Judicature (Consolidation) Act 1925	The Supreme Court of Judicature (Consolidation) Act 1925.	In section 115(2), the proviso.
15 & 16 Geo. 5. c. 49	Supreme Court of Judicature (Consolidation) Act 1925	The Supreme Court of Judicature (Consolidation) Act 1925.	In section 119(1), the words " if appointed since the commencement of the Supreme Court of Judicature (Officers) Act 1879".
15 & 16 Geo. 5. c. 49	Supreme Court of Judicature (Consolidation) Act 1925	The Supreme Court of Judicature (Consolidation) Act 1925.	Section 123(4).
15 & 16 Geo. 5. c. 49	Supreme Court of Judicature (Consolidation) Act 1925	The Supreme Court of Judicature (Consolidation) Act 1925.	In section 126(1), the proviso.
15 & 16 Geo. 5. c. 49	Supreme Court of Judicature (Consolidation) Act 1925	The Supreme Court of Judicature (Consolidation) Act 1925.	Section 127(2).
15 & 16 Geo. 5. c. 49	Supreme Court of Judicature (Consolidation) Act 1925	The Supreme Court of Judicature (Consolidation) Act 1925.	In section 128, in subsection (1), in proviso (i), the words from " to any person to whom " to " applied or " and proviso (ii), in subsection (2), the words " or Part IV", and subsection (3).
15 & 16 Geo. 5. c. 49	Supreme Court of Judicature (Consolidation) Act 1925	The Supreme Court of Judicature (Consolidation) Act 1925.	In Schedule 3, Part IV.
18 & 19 Geo. 5. c. 26	Administration of Justice Act 1928	The Administration of Justice Act 1928.	Section 2.
18 & 19 Geo. 5. c. 26	Administration of Justice Act 1928	The Administration of Justice Act 1928.	Section 4 from " (2) Where a person ".
18 & 19 Geo. 5. c. 26	Administration of Justice Act 1928	The Administration of Justice Act 1928.	Section 13.
18 & 19 Geo. 5. c. 26	Administration of Justice Act 1928	The Administration of Justice Act 1928.	Section 14(2).
25 & 26 Geo. 5. c. 2	Supreme Court of Judicature (Amendment) Act 1935	The Supreme Court of Judicature (Amendment) Act 1935.	Section 2(3).
4 & 5 Eliz. 2. c. 8	County Courts Act 1955	The County Courts Act 1955.	Section 8.
4 & 5 Eliz. 2. c. 8	County Courts Act 1955	The County Courts Act 1955.	Schedule 1.
4 & 5 Eliz. 2. c. 46	Administration of Justice Act 1956	The Administration of Justice Act 1956.	Section 34(2) and (3).
7 & 8 Eliz. 2. c. 22	County Courts Act 1959	The County Courts Act 1959.	Section 199.

== Subsequent developments ==
Sections 22(4), 34(1) and 36(4) of, and schedules 2 and 3 to, the act, together with parts of schedule 1, were repealed by section 1 of, and part XI of the schedule to, the Statute Law (Repeals) Act 1974, which came into force on 27 June 1974.

Section 28 of the act was repealed by section 1(1) of, and part XVI of schedule 1 to, the Statute Law (Repeals) Act 1977, which came into force on 16 June 1977.

Sections 1 to 16 of the act, which established and governed common investment funds for moneys in court in England and Wales, were repealed by section 75 of, and schedule 8 to, the Administration of Justice Act 1982 (1982 c. 53), which came into force on 13 June 1991.
