= Rules of the Supreme Court =

The Rules of the Supreme Court (RSC) were the rules which governed civil procedure in the Supreme Court of Judicature of England and Wales (since 2009 called the Senior Courts) from its formation in 1883 until 1999.

The RSC applied to all civil cases in the Supreme Court in England and Wales commenced after the merger of the courts of common law and equity in 1883 by the Judicature Acts until they were superseded by the Civil Procedure Rules (CPR) in 1999 on 26 April 1999. Civil proceedings in the county courts during this period were governed by the separate County Court Rules.

The RSC were designed to replace the individual rules of the courts of law and equity which were subsumed into the Supreme Court providing one harmonised set of procedural rules for all civil cases.

== History ==
=== The original 1883 Rules ===
Beginning in 1873 the Judicature Acts merged the previously separate English courts of common law and equity into the new Supreme Court of Judicature made up of the Court of Appeal and High Court of Justice. The rules and procedures of the old courts and systems of law differed greatly. As common law and equity would now be applied in the same courts, the judiciary felt that there should be common procedural rules for both systems of law. The RSC were created in 1883 and were made up of Orders and Acts of Parliament.

Over time the original orders and acts were supplemented by further of the same. By 1951 the RSC were made up of some 144 separate Orders and Rules and nine Acts of Parliament.

=== The revised 1965 rules ===
Rules of the Supreme Court (Revision) 1962
- Statutory Instrument
- Parliament of the United Kingdom
- Citation: SI 1962/2145

Dates
- Made: 28 September 1962
- Laid before Parliament: 12 October 1962
- Commencement: 1 January 1964

Other legislation
- Amends: Rules of the Supreme Court 1883
- Made under: Supreme Court of Judicature (Consolidation) Act 1925
- Revoked by: Rules of the Supreme Court (Revision) 1965

Status: Revoked

Text of statute as originally enacted

Rules of the Supreme Court (Revision) 1965
- Statutory Instrument
- Parliament of the United Kingdom
- Citation: SI 1965/1776

Dates
- Made: 30 September 1965
- Laid before Parliament: 2 November 1965
- Commencement: 1 October 1966

Other legislation
- Repeals/revokes: Rules of the Supreme Court 1883; Rules of the Supreme Court (Revision) 1962
- Made under: Supreme Court of Judicature (Consolidation) Act 1925

Text of statute as originally enacted

In 1951 the Evershed Committee on Supreme Court Practice and Procedure published its Second Interim Report in which it strongly recommended that "a complete revision of the Rules be immediately put in hand".

The process consisted of a Rule Committee of the Supreme Court revising and re-writing the entire body of rules governing civil procedure in the Supreme Court. The process was undertaken in two stages. First, around half of the rules were revised and reintroduced on 1 January 1964 by the Rules of the Supreme Court (Revision) 1962 (SI 1962/2145). Second, the remaining original rules were revised and reintroduced by the Rules of the Supreme Court (Revision) 1965 (SI 1965/1776) which also embodied the 1962 revised rules. This gave the Supreme Court, for the first time, one complete, integral body of procedural rules. The revised RSC came into force on 1 October 1966.

== Format ==
The RSC consisted of Orders which concerned specific topics and paragraphs within each order on the specifics. For example, RSC Order 5 concerned the Mode of Beginning Proceedings in High Court, with paragraphs concerning when proceedings must be issued by writ, originating summons, originating motion or petition.

Appendix A of the RSC contained Form Precedents which were compulsory in cases governed by the Rules. These included, inter alia, writs of summons, writs of subpoena, writs and notices for use in enforcement, judgements.

== Replacement ==
The RSC are being gradually replaced by the CPR following the Woolf Reforms. Most of the procedural rules were replaced on 26 April 1999 when the CPR came into force. Some elements of the RSC, especially concerning enforcement of judgments, were integrated into Schedule 1 of the CPR. These are being slowly replaced by new CPR rules as the law in the areas covered by the RSC Orders is reformed. Only 11 RSC Orders now remain in CPR Schedule 1.

== See also ==
- Civil Jurisdiction and Judgments Act 1982
- Civil Procedure Rules
