= Supreme Court of Judicature Act 1902 =

Act of the Parliament of the United Kingdom

Supreme Court of Judicature Act 1902 (Note: Section 2.)
- Act of Parliament
- Parliament of the United Kingdom
- Long title: An Act to amend the Supreme Court of Judicature Acts.
- Citation: 2 Edw. 7. c. 31
- Territorial extent: United Kingdom

Dates
- Royal assent: 25 November 1902
- Commencement: 25 November 1902 (Note: The Acts of Parliament (Commencement) Act 1793.)
- Repealed: 1 January 1926
Other legislation
Amends	Supreme Court of Judicature Act 1875
Repealed by	Supreme Court of Judicature (Consolidation) Act 1925
Relates to	Supreme Court of Judicature Act 1873

Status: Repealed

Text of statute as originally enacted

The Supreme Court of Judicature Act 1902 (2 Edw. 7. c. 31) was an act of the Parliament of the United Kingdom.

The act was one of the Judicature Acts 1873 to 1902 and the Judicature Acts 1873 to 1910.

== Provisions ==
Section 1 of the act substituted the words "three divisions" for the words "two divisions" in section 12 of the Supreme Court of Judicature Act 1875 (38 & 39 Vict. c. 77).

Section 2 of the act provided that the act may be cited as the "Supreme Court of Judicature Act 1902" and may be cited with the Judicature Acts 1873 to 1894.

== Subsequent developments ==
The whole act was repealed by section 226(1) of, and the sixth schedule to, the Supreme Court of Judicature (Consolidation) Act 1925 (15 & 16 Geo. 5. c. 49), which came into force on 1 January 1926.

== See also ==
- Supreme Court of Judicature Act
