= Supreme Court of Judicature Act 1899 =

Act of the Parliament of the United Kingdom

Supreme Court of Judicature Act 1899 (Note: Section 2.)
- Act of Parliament
- Parliament of the United Kingdom
- Long title: An Act to amend the Law with respect to the hearing of Appeals and Motions by the Court of Appeal.
- Citation: 62 & 63 Vict. c. 6
- Territorial extent: United Kingdom

Dates
- Royal assent: 6 June 1899
- Commencement: 6 June 1899 (Note: The Acts of Parliament (Commencement) Act 1793.)
- Repealed: 1 January 1926
Other legislation
Repealed by	Supreme Court of Judicature (Consolidation) Act 1925

Status: Repealed

Text of statute as originally enacted

The Supreme Court of Judicature Act 1899 (62 & 63 Vict. c. 6) was an act of the Parliament of the United Kingdom.

The act was one of the Judicature Acts 1873 to 1899.

== Subsequent developments ==
The whole act was repealed by section 226(1) of, and the sixth schedule to the Supreme Court of Judicature (Consolidation) Act 1925 (15 & 16 Geo. 5. c. 49), which came into force on 1 January 1926.

== See also ==
- Supreme Court of Judicature Act
