= Non-suit =

Legal procedure

A non-suit (British English) or nonsuit (American English) is a legal procedure. A plaintiff (or other person bringing a civil action, such as a petitioner) drops his or her suit, under certain circumstances that do not prevent another action being brought later on the same facts.

== United States ==
In the United States, a voluntary nonsuit is a motion put forward by the plaintiff to release one or more of the defendants from liability.

An example would be a plaintiff suing a physician and a hospital for damages resulting from surgical complications. If the plaintiff settles with the physician, the plaintiff would nonsuit the physician (removing him/her from the suit) but maintain action against the hospital and the suit would continue. If the plaintiff later settles with the hospital before trial, the resulting nonsuit would end the case as all defendants have been released.

A nonsuit is a right of the plaintiff, but it may be prevented if the defendant has pleaded for affirmative relief.

The law in the United States was established as early as 1828 when the Supreme Court ruled:

A nonsuit may not be ordered by the court upon the application of the defendant, and cannot, as we have had occasion to decide at the present term, be ordered in any case without the consent and acquiescence of the plaintiff.

A compulsory nonsuit is a decision by a court that a case cannot proceed to trial, either on substantive or procedural grounds. Depending on which grounds the nonsuit is entered, the plaintiff may or may not be able to file his case again.

In the U.S. Federal Rules of Civil Procedure, the term does not appear, but a dismissal under Rules 12 and 41 has a similar effect.

Often, the term "nonsuit" will appear in older U.S. cases. The meaning of the term in most of these older cases is the same as described for the United Kingdom (see below). This is because most colonies, upon separation from England, still used English common law (as no U.S. or state-specific laws had yet been passed). In more modern parlance, this type of motion is known as a "motion of dismissal".

A few code pleading states, such as California and Pennsylvania, still use the term "nonsuit" to refer to an involuntary or compulsory nonsuit which is granted at the request of an opponent. In such circumstances it is functionally equivalent to a motion for a directed verdict or judgment as a matter of law. For example, in California, a motion for nonsuit under California Code of Civil Procedure Section 581c "is a procedural device which allows a defendant to challenge the sufficiency of plaintiff's evidence to submit the case to the jury," and it cannot be granted if the plaintiff's evidence would be sufficient to support a jury verdict in the plaintiff's favor.

=== Virginia ===
In Virginia, which does not follow the Federal Rules, a nonsuit is known by that name. A nonsuit is simply an agreement by the plaintiff not to proceed in that suit against that defendant, and is not a bar to bringing a future action against the same defendant. There are restrictions on when a Virginia nonsuit may be taken, and only one nonsuit may be taken against a party on a cause of action as a matter of right. Within the limitations, a plaintiff has an absolute right to one nonsuit. A Virginia plaintiff who takes a nonsuit may bring a new action against the same defendant(s) on the same subject matter within six months, regardless of the operation of the Statute of Limitations. The difference between a Federal Rule 41 dismissal and a Virginia nonsuit is more a matter of form than substance, although the Virginia statute does not require the consent of the defendant and can be taken at later stages in the proceeding.

A nonsuit is often taken by a plaintiff who anticipates a judgment or ruling that "imparts finality" against him, who wants to avoid the adverse judgment and preserve at least the possibility of prevailing on the merits of his case in the future.

== United Kingdom ==
=== England and Wales ===
In the common law courts (e.g. the Court of Common Pleas), a party to a civil action had the right to withdraw their claim/counterclaim by nonsuit up until verdict or judgment without prejudice to the launch of a fresh action. There was an equivalent right in the Court of Chancery to dismiss one's own bill (as actions in that court were known as). When the courts were merged by the Supreme Court of Judicature Act 1875, provision was made for the procedure to governed by rules of court. The 1875 rules provided for non suiting but also made provision for setting aside a judgment of nonsuit. In 1883 the nonsuit provisions were repealed and replaced by discontinuance of an action.

Thereafter it was subsequently ruled that nonsuiting ceased to exist in the High Court of Justice having been wholly displaced by the provisions relating to discontinuance.

In the County Courts, the County Court rules continued to provide for nonsuiting until the Rules of the Supreme Court and the County Court Rules were repealed and replaced by the Civil Procedure Rules 1998, which only provided for discontinuance. This brought nonsuiting to an end in mainstream England and Wales (although one cannot comment for e.g. actions in the High Court of Chivalry).

=== Northern Ireland ===
The present court rules make no provision for nonsuiting and provide instead for discontinuance. One therefore presumes nonsuiting no longer exists in Northern Ireland, applying the same principles as in England and Wales.

=== Scotland ===
The position in Scotland is unknown.
