= Court of Appeal (England and Wales) =

Second most senior court in the English legal system

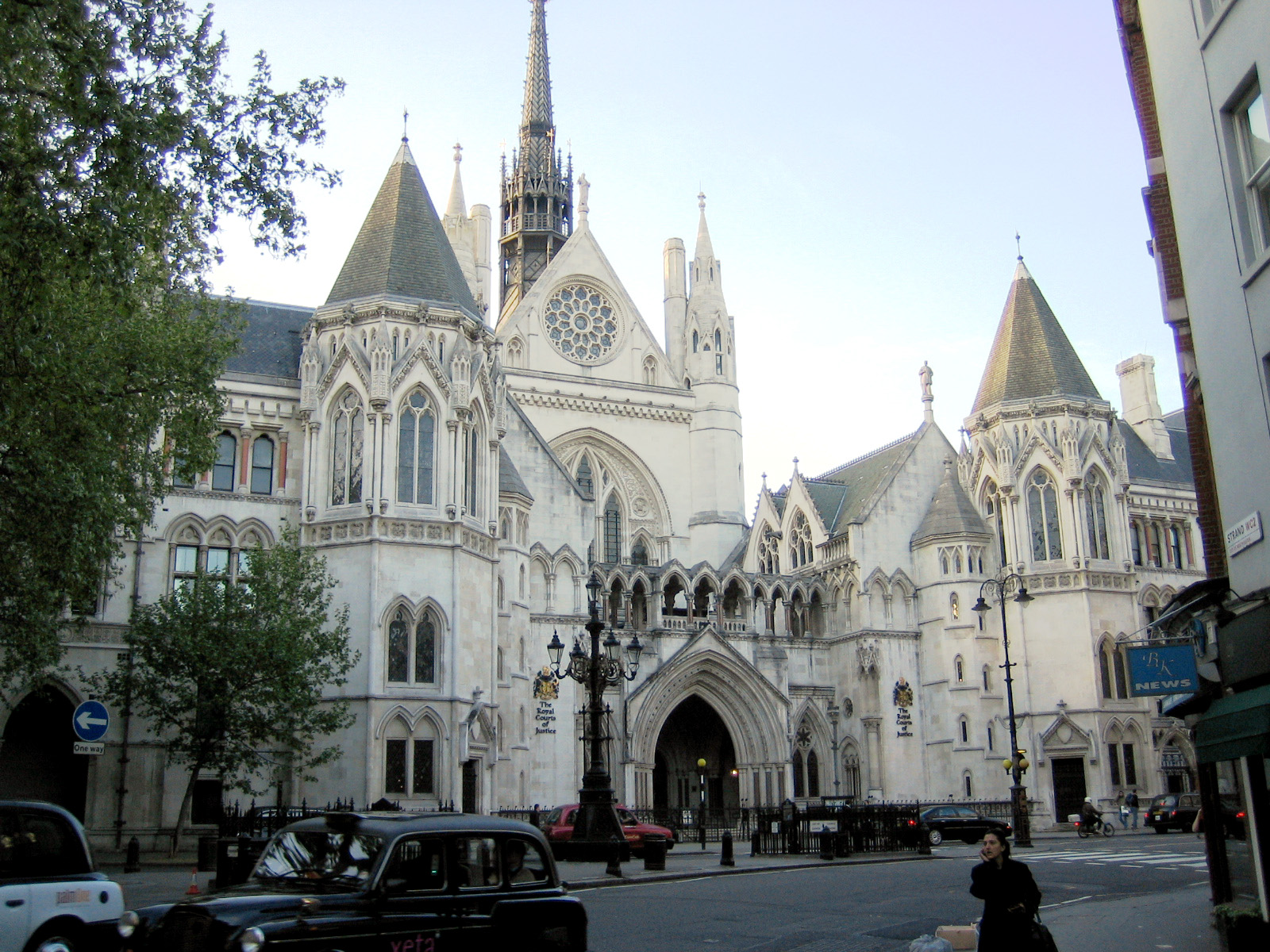
- Royal Courts of Justice, London
- Established: 1 November 1875
- Jurisdiction: England and Wales
- Location: London, WC2
- Composition method: Appointment by the Monarch on recommendation of the Lord Chancellor who receive a recommendation from the Judicial Appointments Commission
- Authorised by: Supreme Court of Judicature Act 1873; Supreme Court of Judicature Act 1875; Supreme Court of Judicature Act 1877 Supreme Court of Judicature Act 1891; Criminal Appeal Act 1907; Supreme Court of Judicature (Consolidation) Act 1925; Supreme Court of Judicature (Amendment) Act 1935; Supreme Court of Judicature (Amendment) Act 1938; Supreme Court of Judicature (Amendment) Act 1944; Supreme Court of Judicature (Amendment) Act 1959; Senior Courts Act 1981 (originally entitled Supreme Court Act 1981); Constitutional Reform Act 2005
- Appeals to: Supreme Court of the United Kingdom
- Appeals from: Crown Court; County Court; High Court of Justice; Family Court
- Judge term length: Mandatory retirement at age 75
- Number of positions: 44
- Website: https://www.judiciary.gov.uk/you-and-the-judiciary/going-to-court/court-of-appeal-home/

Lady Chief Justice of England and Wales
- Currently: The Baroness Carr of Walton-on-the-Hill
- Since: 1 October 2023
- Lead position ends: 1 September 2039
- Jurist term ends: 1 September 2039

Master of the Rolls
- Currently: Sir Geoffrey Vos
- Since: 11 January 2021
- Jurist term ends: 22 April 2030

The Court of Appeal (formally "His Majesty's Court of Appeal in England", commonly cited as "CA", "EWCA" or "CoA") (Note: Welsh: Llys yr Apêl, or Llys Apêl Ei Mawrhydi yng [Nghymru a] Lloegr for "His Majesty's Court of Appeal in England [and Wales].") is the highest court within the Senior Courts of England and Wales, and second in the legal system of England and Wales only to the Supreme Court of the United Kingdom. The Court of Appeal was created in 1875, and today comprises 39 Lord and Lady Justices of Appeal.

The court has two divisions, Criminal and Civil, led by the Lady Chief Justice and the Master of the Rolls respectively. Criminal appeals, from the Crown Court, are heard in the Criminal Division, and civil appeals, from the County Court, High Court of Justice and Family Court, are heard in the Civil Division. Permission to appeal is normally required from either the lower court or the Court of Appeal itself; and with permission, further appeal may lie to the Supreme Court. Its decisions are binding on all courts, including itself, apart from the Supreme Court.

== History ==
=== Formation and early history ===
The appeal system before 1875 was chaotic. The superior courts system consisted of 12 different courts, with appeal on common law matters to the Court of Exchequer Chamber, chancery matters to the Court of Appeal in Chancery and other matters to the Privy Council. The Judicature Commission, which was founded in 1867 to investigate the formation of a "Supreme Court" (a High Court and Court of Appeal), conducted a review of this. The result was published in 1869. The recommendation was that there should be a common system of appeal from all of the High Court divisions, with a limited set of appeals allowed to the House of Lords. This reform was implemented by the Judicature Acts, with the Appellate Jurisdiction Act 1876 giving an almost limitless right of appeal to the Lords.

The new legal structure provided a single Court of Appeal, which heard appeals from all the various divisions of the new unified High Court of Justice. It only heard civil cases: opportunities for appealing in criminal cases remained limited until the 20th century. In its early days, the Court of Appeal divided its sittings between Westminster Hall for appeals from the Common Law divisions, and Lincoln's Inn for Chancery, Probate, Divorce and Admiralty appeals, with five Lords Justices. After the opening of the Royal Courts of Justice in 1882 the Court of Appeal transferred there, where it remains. As well as the Lords Justices, the Lord Chancellor, any previous Lord Chancellors, the Lord Chief Justice, the Lords of Appeal in Ordinary, the Vice-Chancellor of the Chancery Division and the Master of the Rolls could also hear cases, although in practice only the Master of the Rolls did so.

=== Changes in appellate jurisdiction and procedure ===
The absence of limits on appeals to the House of Lords was the cause of much concern: it led to an additional set of expensive and time-consuming appeals from the Court of Appeal, which thus could not take decisions in the knowledge that they were final. The appeals from the county courts were seen similarly, involving an appeal to the High Court of Justice and the bypassing of the Court of Appeal for a second set of appeals to the Lords. The Administration of Justice (Appeals) Act 1934, a short statute, solved both problems neatly by abolishing the appeal of county court decisions to the High Court and instead sending them automatically to the Court of Appeal, and by establishing that appeals to the Lords could only take place with the consent of the Court of Appeal or of the Lords themselves.

A second set of reforms to the appeals system followed the report of the Evershed Committee on High Court Procedure in 1953, which recognised the high cost to the litigants of an additional set of appeals, particularly since the loser in a civil case paid the victor's legal bills. Among the few changes that were made, the practice ceased of counsel reading out the judgment, cross-examinations, documents and evidence given in the lower court; this saved time and costs. The process of "leapfrogging" (appealing from the High Court to the House of Lords without needing to go through the Court of Appeal), which the committee had recommended, was eventually brought into force with the Administration of Justice Act 1969.

A separate Court of Criminal Appeal had been established in 1908. In 1966 this was merged with its older namesake, establishing the present-day structure of a single Court of Appeal with two Divisions: Civil and Criminal.

In the early 1960s there was discussion between judges and academics in the United Kingdom and the United States comparing the processes of appeal used in each nation. Although the British judges found the emphasis on written arguments unattractive, they did like the idea of pre-reading: that the court should read the pleadings of counsel, the case being appealed and the judgment from the lower court before delivering its judgment. But the idea was quietly scrapped, despite a successful tryout in the Court of Appeal. The court over which Lord Denning presided from 1962 to 1982 was under no pressure and had no inclination to modernise, with liaisons and management handled by clerks with little knowledge. This changed in 1981 with the appointment of a Registrar, John Adams, an academic and lawyer, who significantly reformed the internal workings of the Court.

=== The Woolf and Bowman reforms ===
In July 1996, Lord Woolf published Access to Justice, a report on the accessibility of the courts to the public. Woolf identified civil litigation as being characterised by excessive cost, delay and complexity, and succeeded in replacing the diverse rules with a single set of Civil Procedure Rules. Before Woolf had even published his final report, Sir Jeffery Bowman, the recently retired senior partner of PriceWaterhouse, was commissioned to write a report on the Civil Division of the Court of Appeal. Bowman noted a growing workload and delays, with 14 months between setting down and disposing of a case in 70% of cases, the rest taking even longer than that – some had taken five years. He recommended extending the requirement to ask leave to appeal to almost all appeal cases; allowing certain appeals to be heard at a lower level; focusing of procedure; imposition of time limits on oral arguments; and the use of judicial time more towards reading and less towards sitting in court.

Bowman's recommendations were mainly enacted through statutory provisions, such as Part IV of the Access to Justice Act 1999. In Tanfern Ltd v Cameron-MacDonald [2000] 1 WLR 1311, Brooke LJ laid down the procedural methods of the Court of Appeal post-Woolf and Bowman. With a few exceptions, such as cases where "the liberty of the subject" is an issue, permission is required to appeal, and may be granted either by the lower court or by the Court of Appeal. As a general rule, appeals are now limited to a review of the decision of the lower court, only allowing a full appeal where there was a serious procedural irregularity or the decision was wrong through "blatant error".

== Divisions ==
=== Civil Division ===
The Civil Division deals with all non-criminal cases, and has been part of the court since its establishment in 1875. The Civil Division is bound by the Supreme Court of the United Kingdom when making decisions, and is normally bound by its own previous decisions, with four exceptions:

- where the previous decision was given per incuriam (where a statute or a rule having statutory effect which would have affected the decision was not brought to the attention of the earlier court);
- where there are two previous conflicting decisions;
- where there is a conflicting Supreme Court (or House of Lords) decision;
- where a law was assumed to exist in a previous case but did not.

The first three were established by the case of Young v Bristol Aeroplane Co Ltd in 1944, the fourth by R (on the application of Kadhim) v Brent London Borough Housing Benefit Review Board in 2001. The Civil Division is led by the Master of the Rolls, currently Geoffrey Vos (who is entitled to the post-nominal MR), assisted by the Vice-President of the Civil Division, Sir Nicholas Underhill. The division hears cases from the High Court of Justice, the County Court and several tribunals.

Although the Lady Chief Justice is senior to the Master of the Rolls, the Civil Division is much broader in scope than the Criminal Division. With only three judges on the bench (rather than five or more in the Supreme Court), this allows the Master of the Rolls huge opportunity for shaping the common law and, most notably, Lord Denning made the most of this potential.

=== Criminal Division ===
The Criminal Division was established in 1966 with the merger of the Court of Criminal Appeal into the Court of Appeal. It hears all appeals from the Crown Court which are in connection with a trial on indictment (i.e. with a jury) and where the Crown Court has sentenced a defendant committed from the Magistrates' Court. It also exercises the jurisdiction to order the issue of writs of venire de novo. The Criminal Division, while bound by the Supreme Court, is more flexible with binding itself, due to the heightened stakes in a case where a possible penalty is a prison sentence. The Division is led by the Lady Chief Justice, currently The Baroness Carr of Walton-on-the-Hill, assisted by the Vice-President of the Criminal Division, currently Lord Justice Edis.

== Procedure for appeal ==
Sections 54 to 59 of the Access to Justice Act 1999 and Part 52 of the Civil Procedure Rules 1998 came into force on 2 May 2000, and created one universal appeals system; not all of these are to the Court of Appeal, with the principle used that an appeal should go to the next highest court in the hierarchy. Appeals are allowed if the decision in the court below was incorrect, or suffered from a serious procedural error or irregularity.

Almost all appeals require permission, a major innovation from the previous system, where appeals were, on the request of counsel, almost all automatically put through. The application for permission should be made to the lower court, although this is not mandatory; it may be asked of the appellate court itself. In Re T (A Child) [2002] EWCA Civ 1736, the Civil Division strongly advised that counsel apply at the lower courts, since the judge, fully aware of the facts, will take less time to process, there is no harm if the application fails or if it is approved but counsel decides not to proceed with the case and there are no additional costs involved. The only problem here is that judgments may occasionally be reserved, and only given later by post – there may not be an opportunity to ask for permission to appeal at the lower court.

The Court of Appeal, when considering an application for appeal, may decide based on the paper documents or refer the case to an oral hearing, something often done when it is apparent that a refusal of the written case will lead the applicant to send a second, oral application. If a written application is refused, the applicant may ask for an oral hearing to discuss the refusal. Under the Civil Procedure Rules 1998, the appeal must have "a real prospect of success", or there must be "some other compelling reason why the appeal should be heard" for it to be accepted.

Under certain, limited, circumstances, second appeals are allowed. This is when an appeal goes to the High Court or the County Court and a party to the case wishes to appeal it further, to the Court of Appeal. Section 55(1) of the Access to Justice Act 1999 says that, when an appeal is made to the County Court or the High Court and that court makes a decision, no further appeal is allowed to the Court of Appeal unless the Court considers that the case raises "an important point of principle or practice" or "there is some other compelling reason for the Court of Appeal to hear it". In Tanfern Ltd v Cameron-MacDonald [2000] 1 WLR 1311 the Court commented on this limitation of second appeals, pointing out that the Lords Justices of Appeal were a valuable and scarce resource – it was necessary to impose limitations on appeals to prevent the Court and its judges becoming overburdened.

There are two sorts of hearings that the Court of Appeal can hold; reviews, and full rehearings. Section 52.11(1) of the Civil Procedure Rules 1998 establishes that appeals should always be reviews, unless there are individual circumstances that, "in the interest of justice", make a rehearing necessary. In its case law, the Court has emphasised that it is up to the individual panel of judges to decide whether to hold a review or rehearing, with the circumstances of the case playing a large part. In 2004 the Court heard 1,059 appeals, of which 295 were allowed and 413 directly dismissed.

Qualifying cases seeking settlement of contract or personal injury claims up to a value of £100,000, for which permission to appeal has been sought, obtained or adjourned, may be referred to the Court of Appeal Mediation Scheme, a mediation scheme operated by the Centre for Effective Dispute Resolution (CEDR), so that cases can be resolved more speedily without absorbing court time and impacting less significantly on any ongoing relationship between the litigants. Data reported in 2022 stated that the scheme had achieved a 40–50% success rate.

== Judges ==
The Court of Appeal's main judges are the Lord Justices of Appeal and Lady Justices of Appeal. The Senior Courts Act 1981 provides that the Court of Appeal comprises 39 ordinary sitting Lords and Lady Justices and the Lady Chief Justice, Master of the Rolls, President of the Queen's Bench Division, President of the Family Division, and Chancellor of the High Court. Retired Lords and Lady Justices sometimes sit in cases, as have retired Law Lords, and High Court judges are allowed to sit on occasion and there are a number of Senior Circuit Judges authorised to sit as judges of the Criminal Division.

Lords and Lady Justices have, since 1946, been drawn exclusively from the High Court of Justice; prior to this, Lords Justices were sometimes recruited directly from the Bar. Dame Elizabeth Butler-Sloss was the first woman appointed as a Lord Justice of Appeal in 1988; she was known officially as "Lord Justice" until a practice direction was issued in 1994 to refer to her informally as "Lady Justice", and the official title in section 3 of the Senior Courts Act 1981 was amended by the Courts Act 2003. As of early 2026, the number of active Lady Justices is 10 out of 39.

The division of work in the Court of Appeal is demonstrated by the 2005 statistics, in which Lords and Lady Justices sat 66% of the time, High Court Judges 26% of the time and Circuit and Deputy High Court Judges 8 per cent of the time. Lord and Lady Justices are currently paid £188,900, with the Master of the Rolls paid £205,700 and the Lady Chief Justice £230,400.

The Civil Division is led by the Master of the Rolls, currently Sir Geoffrey Vos; the Chancellor of the High Court and President of the Family Division regularly, for a period of weeks, lead the Civil Division. Several Civil Division Lords Justices are seconded to the Criminal Division, which is currently led by the Lady Chief Justice, The Baroness Carr of Walton-on-the-Hill.

== Broadcasting ==
On 31 October 2013 the Court of Appeal allowed cameras in the court for a (70-second broadcast delay) "live" broadcast feed for the first time. Cameras were banned in all courts in 1925 (although they were allowed in the Supreme Court of the United Kingdom from its 2009 inception). Cameras have now been allowed in some courts due to changes made by the Crime and Courts Act 2013. In 2013, only one court could be broadcast per day.

== See also ==
- Judiciary of England and Wales
- Courts of England and Wales

== Bibliography ==
- Drewry, Gavin; Louis Bloom-Cooper; Charles Blake (2007). The Court of Appeal. Suzanne Fullbrook. Oxford and Portland, Oregon: Hart Publishing. ISBN 978-1-84113-387-4.
- Elliott, Catherine; Frances Quinn (2008). English Legal System (9th ed.). Pearson Longman. ISBN 978-1-4058-5941-7.
