= Supreme Court of Judicature Act 1910 =

Act of the Parliament of the United Kingdom

Supreme Court of Judicature Act 1910 (Note: Section 2.)
- Act of Parliament
- Parliament of the United Kingdom
- Long title: An Act to provide for the appointment of two additional Judges of the High Court.
- Citation: 10 Edw. 7. & 1 Geo. 5. c. 12
- Territorial extent: United Kingdom

Dates
- Royal assent: 26 July 1910
- Commencement: 26 July 1910 (Note: The Acts of Parliament (Commencement) Act 1793.)
- Repealed: 1 January 1926
Other legislation
Repealed by	Supreme Court of Judicature (Consolidation) Act 1925

Status: Repealed

Text of statute as originally enacted

The Supreme Court of Judicature Act 1910 (10 Edw. 7. & 1 Geo. 5. c. 12) was an act of the Parliament of the United Kingdom.

The act was one of the Judicature Acts 1873 to 1910.

== Subsequent developments ==
The whole act was repealed by section 226(1) of, and the sixth schedule to the Supreme Court of Judicature (Consolidation) Act 1925 (15 & 16 Geo. 5. c. 49), which came into force on 1 January 1926.

== See also ==
- Supreme Court of Judicature Act
