= Arbitration Act 1889 =

Act of the Parliament of the United Kingdom

Arbitration Act 1889 (Note: Section 30.)
- Act of Parliament
- Parliament of the United Kingdom
- Long title: An Act for amending and consolidating the Enactments relating to Arbitration.
- Citation: 52 & 53 Vict. c. 49
- Introduced by: Hardinge Giffard, 1st Baron Halsbury (Lords)
- Territorial extent: England and Wales (Note: Section 28.)

Dates
- Royal assent: 26 August 1889
- Commencement: 1 January 1890 (Note: Section 29.)
- Repealed: 1 September 1950
Other legislation
Amends	See § Repealed enactments
Repeals/revokes	See § Repealed enactments
Amended by	Supreme Court of Judicature (Consolidation) Act 1925; Administration of Justice (Miscellaneous Provisions) Act 1933; Arbitration Act 1934
Repealed by	Arbitration Act 1950
Relates to	Arbitration Clauses (Protocol) Act 1924; Arbitration (Foreign Awards) Act 1930; Arbitration Act 1996

Status: Repealed

History of passage through Parliament

Records of Parliamentary debate relating to the statute from Hansard

Text of statute as originally enacted

The Arbitration Act 1889 (52 & 53 Vict. c. 49) was an act of the Parliament of the United Kingdom that consolidated enactments relating to the arbitration of disputes in England and Wales.

== Passage ==
The Arbitration Bill had its first reading in the House of Lords on 22 February 1889, presented by the Lord Chancellor, Hardinge Giffard, 1st Baron Halsbury. The bill had its second reading in the House of Lords on 25 March 1889 and was committed to a committee of the whole house on 3 May 1889. The committee was discharged on 6 May 1889 and the bill was committed to the Standing Committee for Bills relating to Law, &c, which reported on 28 May 1889, with amendments. The amended bill was re-committed to a committee of the whole house, which met on 31 May 1889 and reported on 3 June 1889. The amended bill had its third reading in the House of Lords on 3 June 1889 and passed, without amendments.

The bill had its first reading in the House of Commons on 4 June 1889. The bill had its second reading in the House of Commons on 31 July 1889 and was committed to a committee of the whole house, which met and reported on 2 August 1889, with amendments. The amended bill had its third reading in the House of Commons on 14 August 1889 and passed, with amendments.

The amended bill was considered and agreed to by the House of Lords on 16 August 1889.

The bill was granted royal assent on 26 August 1889.

== Provisions ==
Section 25 of the act provided that the act would not affect any arbitrations pending before the commencement of the act, but would affect arbitrations commenced following the commencement of the act under any agreements before or after that commencement.

=== Repealed enactments ===
Section 26 of the act repealed 5 enactments, listed in the second schedule to the act. Section 26 of the act also provided that the repealed would not affect anything done, any rights, duties or liabilities or legal proceedings made under the repealed enactments.

Citation	Short title	Title	Extent of repeal
9 Will. 3. c. 15	Arbitration Act 1697	An Act for determining differences by arbitration.	The whole act.
3 & 4 Will. 4. c. 42	Civil Procedure Act 1833	An Act for the further amendment of the law and the better advancement of Justice.	Sections thirty-nine to forty-one, both inclusive.
17 & 18 Vict. c. 125	Common Law Procedure Act 1854	The Common Law Procedure Act, 1854.	Sections three to seventeen, both inclusive.
36 & 37 Vict. c. 66	Supreme Court of Judicature Act 1873	The Supreme Court of Judicature Act, 1873.	Section fifty-six, from "Subject to any Rules of Court" down to "as a judgment by the Court," both inclusive, and the words "special referee or." Sections fifty-seven to fifty-nine, both inclusive.
47 & 48 Vict. c. 61	Supreme Court of Judicature Act 1884	The Supreme Court of Judicature Act, 1884.	Sections nine to eleven, both inclusive.

== Subsequent developments ==
The act was described as a consolidation act.

The whole act was repealed section 44(3) of the Arbitration Act 1950 (14 Geo. 6. c. 27), which came into force on 1 September 1950.
