= Supreme Court of Judicature (Consolidation) Act 1925 =

Act of the Parliament of the United Kingdom

Supreme Court of Judicature (Consolidation) Act 1925 (Note: Section 227(1).)
- Act of Parliament
- Parliament of the United Kingdom
- Long title: An Act to consolidate the Judicature Acts, 1873 to 1910, and other enactments relating to the Supreme Court of Judicature in England and the administration of Justice therein.
- Citation: 15 & 16 Geo. 5. c. 49
- Territorial extent: United Kingdom

Dates
- Royal assent: 31 July 1925
- Commencement: 1 January 1926 (Note: Section 227(2).)
- Repealed: 1 January 1982
Other legislation
Amends	See § Repealed enactments
Repeals/revokes	See § Repealed enactments
Amended by	Administration of Justice Act 1928; Solicitors Act 1932; Administration of Justice Act 1932; Administration of Justice (Miscellaneous Provisions) Act 1933; County Courts Act 1934; Supreme Court of Judicature (Amendment) Act 1935; Matrimonial Causes Act 1937; Administration of Justice (Miscellaneous Provisions) Act 1938; Supreme Court of Judicature (Amendment) Act 1948; British Nationality Act 1948; Representation of the People Act 1949; Married Women (Restraint upon Anticipation) Act 1949; Matrimonial Causes Act 1950; Administration of Justice Act 1956; Solicitors Act 1957; Public Records Act 1958; Highways Act 1959; Mental Health Act 1959; Statute Law Revision Act 1963; Administration of Justice Act 1965; Family Law Reform Act 1969; Courts Act 1971; Powers of Attorney Act 1971; Administration of Justice Act 1977; Statute Law (Repeals) Act 1978; Judicial Pensions Act 1981
Repealed by	Supreme Court Act 1981
Relates to	Housing Act 1925; Housing (Scotland) Act 1925; Town Planning Act 1925; Town Planning (Scotland) Act 1925; Settled Land Act 1925; Trustee Act 1925; Law of Property Act 1925; Land Registration Act 1925; Land Charges Act 1925; Universities and College Estates Act 1925; Administration of Estates Act 1925; Workmen's Compensation Act 1925

Status: Repealed

Text of statute as originally enacted

The Supreme Court of Judicature (Consolidation) Act 1925 (15 & 16 Geo. 5. c. 49), sometimes referred to as the Supreme Court of Judicature Act 1925, was an act of the Parliament of the United Kingdom.

== Provisions ==
=== Short title, commencement and extent ===
Section 227(1) of the act provided that the act may be cited as the "Supreme Court of Judicature (Consolidation) Act, 1925".

Section 227(2) of the act provided that the act would come into force on 1 January 1926.

=== Repealed enactments ===
Section 226(1) of the act repealed 103 enactments, listed in the sixth schedule to the act.

Citation	Short title	Description	Extent of repeal
31 Edw. 3	Administration of Estates Act 1357	The Statute made at Westminster on the Monday next after the Feast of Easter in the thirty-first year, Statute the first.	Chapter eleven.
14 Hen. 6. c. 1	Judgment in Treason and Felony	Justices of nisi prius may give judgement etc. in treason and felony.	The whole act.
3 Hen. 7. c. 3	Taking of Bail by Justices Act 1487	An Act that Justices of Peace may take Bayle.	The words from “ and ov.” to “ C. S.”
23 Hen. 8. c. 9	Ecclesiastical Jurisdiction Act 1531	An Acte that no psonne shal be cited oute of the Dioc where he or she dwelleth excepte in ctayne cases.	Sections three and five.
27 Hen. 8. c. 24	Jurisdiction in Liberties Act 1535	An Acte for recontynuing off ctayne lbties and franchises heretofore taken frome the Crowne.	In section two the words “of eire justices of assise,” the words "or justices of gaole delyvey,” the words “ justices of eire, justices of assise,” and the words “ and justices of gaole delyvey.”
33 Hen. 8. c. 24	Justices of Assize, etc. Act 1541	An Acte that noe man shal be Justice of Assise in his owne countrie.	The whole act.
1 Edw. 6. c. 7	Justices of the Peace Act 1547	An Acte for the contynuance of Actions after the death of anny King of this Realme.	The whole Act except so far as it relates to justices of the peace.
4 Will. & Mar.	Special Bail Act 1692	An Act for takeing Special Bails in the Countrey upon Actions and Suites depending in the Courts of Kings-Bench Comon Pleas and Exchequer att Westminster.	The whole act.
1 Ann. c. 2 (Note: This is the citation in The Statutes of the Realm.)	Demise of the Crown Act 1702	An Act for explaining a Clause in an Act made at the Parliament begun and holden at Westminster the two and twentieth of November in the seventh year of the reign of our Sovereign Lord King William the Third entitled An Act for the better security of His Majesty’s Royal Person and Government.	Section live, so far as it relates to commissions and writs in England other than commissions of the peace.
24 Geo. 2. c. 48	Michaelmas Term Act 1750	The Michaelmas Term Act, 1750.	The whole act.
25 Geo. 2. c. 30	Calendar Act 1751	The Calendar Act, 1751.	In section four the words from “and the usual ” to the words “October in every year ” and the words from “ And whereas by another” to the words “ninth day of November in every year.”
39 Geo. 3. c. 110	Judges' Pensions Act 1799	The Judges' Pensions Act 1799.	The whole act.
53 Geo. 3. c. 153	Judges' Pensions Act 1813	The Judges’ Pensions Act, 1813.	The whole act.
3 Geo. 4. c. 10	Assize Commission Act 1822	The Assize Commission Act, 1822.	The whole act.
6 Geo. 4. c. 82	Chief Justice's Pension Act 1825	The Chief Justice’s Pension Act, 1825.	The whole act.
11 Geo. 4 & 1 Will. 4. c. 70	Law Terms Act 1830	The Law Terms Act, 1830	Section six.
1 Will. 4. c. 3	Law Terms (Explanation) Act 1830	The Law Terms (Exjdanation) Act, 1830.	The whole act.
3 & 4 Will. 4. c. 71	Assizes Act 1833	The Assizes Act, 1833	The whole act.
6 & 7 Will. 4. c. 87	Liberties Act 1836	The Liberties Act, 1836	Section eight.
7 Will. 4 & 1 Vict. c. 30	Superior Courts (Officers) Act 1837	The Superior Courts (Officers) Act, 1837.	The whole act.
2 & 3 Vict. c. 72	Assizes Act 1839	The Assizes Act, 1839.	The whole act.
3 & 4 Vict. c. 65	Admiralty Court Act 1840	The Admiralty Court Act, 1840.	Sections three, four, six, twenty-two and twenty-three.
5 & 6 Vict. c. 103	Court of Chancery Act 1842	The Court of Chancery Act, 1842.	The whole act.
14 & 15 Vict. c. 41	Chief Justice's Salary Act 1851	The Chief Justice’s Salary Act, 1851.	The whole act.
14 & 15 Vict. c. 83	Court of Chancery Act 1851	The Court of Chancery Act, 1851.	Section eighteen.
15 & 16 Vict. c. 73	Common Law Courts Act 1852	The Common Law Courts Act, 1852.	Section eleven.
15 & 16 Vict. c. 80	Master in Chancery Abolition Act 1852	The Court of Chancery Act, 1852.	The whole act.
15 & 16 Vict. c. 87	Suitors in Chancery Relief Act 1852	The Court of Chancery Act, 1852.	Sections sixteen, twenty-one and forty-two.
17 & 18 Vict. c. 34	Attendance of Witnesses Act 1854	The Attendance of Witnesses Act, 1854.	The whole act so far as it authorises the issue of process by the High Court..
18 & 19 Vict. c. 134	Court of Chancery Act 1855	The Court of Chancery Act, 1855.	The whole act.
20 & 21 Vict. c. 77	Court of Probate Act 1857	The Court of Probate Act, 1857.	Sections four, thirteen, twenty to twenty-three, twenty-nine, thirty, and forty-six to fifty-three, in section fifty-eight the words “ and the decision of the Court of Probate on such appeal shall be final,” sections fifty-nine, sixty-one to sixty-four and sixty-six to sixty-nine, eighty-seven, eighty-nine to ninety-three, one hundred and ten and one hundred and nineteen, and Schedule A.
20 & 21 Vict. c. 79	Probates and Letters of Administration Act (Ireland) 1857	The Probates anil Letters of Administration (Ireland) Act, 1857.	Section ninety-five so far as it relates to grants made in respect of the estates of persons dying on or after the first day of April, nineteen hundred and twenty-three.
20 & 21 Vict. c. 85	Matrimonial Causes Act 1857	The Matrimonial Causes Act, 1857.	Sections two, six, seven, twelve, thirteen, sixteen and seventeen, and so far as it relates to the High Court section twenty-one, sections twenty-two to thirty-one, thirty-three to thirty-five, forty-five, fiftyfive, fifty-seven, fiftyeight, and sixty-six.
21 & 22 Vict. c. 56	Confirmation of Executors (Scotland) Act 1858	The Confirmation of Executors (Scotland) Act, 1858.	Section twelve.
21 & 22 Vict. c. 93	Legitimacy Declaration Act 1858	The Legitimacy Declaration Act, 1858.	The whole act, except section three and except so far as the Act relates to Scotland.
21 & 22 Vict. c. 95	Court of Probate Act 1858	The Court of Probate Act, 1858.	Sections three, eight, ten, twelve, twenty, twenty-four to twenty-seven, section twenty-nine so far as it relates to grants made in respect of the estates of persons dying on or after the first day of April, nineteen hundred and twenty-three, and sections thirty-five and thirty-seven.
21 & 22 Vict. c. 108	Matrimonial Causes Act 1858	The Matrimonial Causes Act, 1858.	Sections four, six to eleven, and fifteen.
22 & 23 Vict. c. 21	Queen's Remembrancer Act 1859	The Queen’s Remembrancer Act, 1859.	Section seventeen.
22 & 23 Vict. c. 61	Matrimonial Causes Act 1859	The Matrimonial Causes Act, 1859.	The whole act.
23 & 24 Vict. c. 91	Oxford University Act 1860	The Oxford University Act, 1860.	Section two.
23 & 24 Vict. c. 126	Common Law Procedure Act 1860	The Common Law Procedure Act, 1860.	Sections one and twenty-two.
23 & 24 Vict. c. 144	Matrimonial Causes Act 1860	The Matrimonial Causes Act, 1860.	The whole act.
24 & 25 Vict. c. 10	Admiralty Court Act 1861	The Admiralty Court Act, 1861.	Sections four, five, seven, eight, ten, eleven, twenty-seven and thirty-five.
27 & 28 Vict.	Matrimonial Causes Act 1864	The Matrimonial Causes Act, 1864.	The whole act so far as it relates to the High Court.
28 & 29 Vict. c. 48	Courts of Justice Building Act 1865	The Courts of Justice Building Act, 1865.	Sections eighteen to twenty-one.
29 & 30 Vict. c. 32	Matrimonial Causes Act 1866	The Matrimonial Causes Act, 1866.	The whole act.
31 & 32 Vict. c. 77	Divorce Amendment Act 1868	The Matrimonial Causes Act, 1868.	The whole act.
32 & 33 Vict. c. 68	Evidence Further Amendment Act 1869	The Evidence Further Amendment Act, 1869.	Section three so far as it relates to the High Court.
32 & 33 Vict. c. 89	Clerks of Assize, &c. Act 1869	The Clerks of Assize, &e. Act, 1869.	The whole act.
32 & 33 Vict. c. 91	Courts of Justice (Salaries and Funds) Act 1869	The Courts of Justice (Salaries and Funds) Act, 1869.	Sections twelve and thirteen, so far as they relate to the officers of the Supreme Court.
35 & 36 Vict. c. 44	Court of Chancery (Funds) Act 1872	The Court of Chancery (Funds) Act, 1872.	The whole act.
35 & 36 Vict. c. 51	Judges Salaries Act 1872	The Judges’ Salaries Act, 1872.	In section four the words "in England and".
36 & 37 Vict. c. 31	Matrimonial Causes Act 1873	The Matrimonial Causes Act, 1873.	The whole act.
36 & 37 Vict. c. 36	Supreme Court of Judicature Act 1873	The Supreme Court of Judicature Act, 1873.	The whole Act except the following provisions thereof, that is to say, paragraph (2) of section twenty-five, sections forty-six, sixty-four and sixty-six.
38 & 39 Vict. c. 41	Intestates Widows and Children (Scotland) Act 1875	The Intestates Widows and Children (Scotland) Act, 1875.	Section three so far as it relates to the resealing of confirmations in England.
38 & 39 Vict. c. 77	Supreme Court of Judicature Act 1875	The Supreme Court of Judicature Act, 1875.	The whole act.
39 & 40 Vict. c. 24	Small Testate Estates (Scotland) Act 1876	The Small Testate Estates (Scotland) Act, 1876.	Section three so far as it relates to the resealing of confirmations in England.
39 & 40 Vict. c. 57	Winter Assizes Act 1876	The Winter Assizes Act, 1876.	The whole act.
39 & 40 Vict. c. 59	Appellate Jurisdiction Act 1876	The Appellate Jurisdiction Act, 1876.	Sections fifteen to twenty.
39 & 40 Vict. c. 70	Sheriff Courts (Scotland) Act 1876	The Sheriff Courts (Scotland) Act, 1876.	Sections forty-two and forty three so far as they relate to the resealing of confirmations or additional confirmations in England.
40 & 41 Vict. c. 9	Supreme Court of Judicature Act 1877	The Supreme Court of Judicature Act, 1877.	The whole act.
40 & 41 Vict. c. 11	Jurisdiction in Rating Act 1877	The Jurisdiction in Rating Act, 1877.	In section three the words from "As to England" to the words "of Justice and".
40 & 41 Vict. c. 46	Winter Assizes Act 1877	The Winter Assizes Act, 1877.	The whole act.
41 & 42 Vict. c. 19	Matrimonial Causes Act 1878	The Matrimonial Causes Act, 1878.	The whole act.
42 & 43 Vict. c. 1	Spring Assizes Act 1879	The Spring Assizes Act, 1879.	Sections two and four.
42 & 43 Vict. c. 78	Supreme Court of Judicature (Officers) Act 1879	The Supreme Court of Judicature (Officers) Act, 1879.	The whole act.
43 Vict. c. 14	Customs and Inland Revenue Act 1880	The Customs and Inland Revenue Act, 1880.	Subsection (2) of section ten.
43 & 44 Vict. c. 10	Great Seal Act 1880	The Great Seal Act, 1880	The whole act.
44 & 45 Vict. c. 41	Conveyancing Act 1881	The Conveyancing Act, 1881.	Section forty-eight.
44 & 45 Vict. c. 59	Statute Law Revision and Civil Procedure Act 1881	The Statute Law Revision and Civil Procedure Act, 1881.	Section six.
44 & 45 Vict. c. 68	Supreme Court of Judicature Act 1881	The Supreme Court of Judicature Act, 1881.	The whole Act except section one, and the third and fourth paragraphs of section nine.
45 & 46 Vict. c. 50	Municipal Corporations Act 1882	The Municipal Corporations Act, 1882.	Subsection (3) of section one hundred and eighty-two.
46 & 47 Vict. c. 29	Supreme Court of Judicature (Funds, &c.) Act 1883	The Supreme Court of Judicature (Funds, &c.) Act, 1883.	The whole act.
46 & 47 Vict. c. 49	Statute Law Revision and Civil Procedure Act 1883	The Statute Law Revision and Civil Procedure Act, 1883.	The whole act.
47 & 48 Vict. c. 61	Supreme Court of Judicature Act 1884	The Supreme Court of Judicature Act, 1884.	The whole act.
47 & 48 Vict. c. 68	Matrimonial Causes Act 1884	The Matrimonial Causes Act, 1884.	The whole act.
51 & 52 Vict. c. 25	Railway and Canal Traffic Act 1888	The Railway and Canal Traffic Act, 1888.	Section six.
51 & 52 Vict. c. 43	County Courts Act 1888	The County Courts Act, 1888.	Sections sixteen, one hundred and twenty-five and one hundred and eighty-seven.
52 & 53 Vict. c. 47	Palatine Court of Durham Act 1889	The Palatinate Court of Durham Act, 1889.	Section eleven to the words "for the time being and."
52 & 53 Vict. c. 49	Arbitration Act 1889	The Arbitration Act, 1889	Sections thirteen to seventeen and, so far as they relate to references under an order of the High Court, sections eighteen, nineteen, twenty and twenty-three.
53 & 54 Vict. c. 23	Chancery of Lancaster Act 1890	The Chancery of Lancaster Act, 1890.	Subsection (1) of section four.
53 & 54 Vict. c. 44	Supreme Court of Judicature Act 1890	The Supreme Court of Judicature Act, 1890.	The whole act.
54 & 55 Vict. c. 53	Supreme Court of Judicature Act 1891	The Supreme Court of Judicature Act, 1891.	Sections one, two, and four.
57 & 58 Vict. c. 16	Supreme Court of Judicature (Procedure) Act 1894	The Supreme Court of Judicature (Procedure) Act, 1894.	The whole act.
57 & 58 Vict. c. 30	Finance Act 1894	The Finance Act, 1894	Subsection (4) of section sixteen so far as it relates to the resealing in England of Irish grants made in respect of the estates of persons dying on or after the first day of April, nineteen hundred and twenty-three.
57 & 58 Vict. c. 60	Merchant Shipping Act 1894	The Merchant Shipping Act, 1894.	Subsections (2) and (3) of section five hundred and forty-seven and section five hundred and sixty-five so far as they relate to the High Court in England.
59 & 60 Vict. c. 51	Vexatious Actions Act 1896	The Vexatious Actions Act, 1896.	The whole act.
62 & 63 Vict. c. 6	Supreme Court of Judicature Act 1899	The Supreme Court of Judicature Act, 1899.	The whole act.
2 Edw. 7. c. 31	Supreme Court of Judicature Act 1902	The Supreme Court of Judicature Act, 1902.	The whole act.
7 Edw. 7. c. 12	Matrimonial Causes Act 1907	The Matrimonial Causes Act, 1907.	The whole act.
8 Edw. 7. c. 41	Assizes and Quarter Sessions Act 1908	The Assizes and Quarter Sessions Act, 1908.	In section one the words "the commission day in the case of assizes and", and the words "assize or" in subsection (1); the words "assizes or" wherever those words occur in subsection (3); subsection (4); the words "assizes or", the words "commission day or", and the words "as the case may be" in subsection (5). In section two the words "assizes or" and the words "court of assize or". In section four the words "as respects assizes the clerk of assize and" and the words from "the expression commission day" to the end of the section.
8 Edw. 7. c. 51	Appellate Jurisdiction Act 1908	The Appellate Jurisdiction Act, 1908.	Section six.
9 Edw. 7. c. 11	Judicature (Rule Committee) Act 1909	The Judicature (Rule Committee) Act, 1909.	The whole act.
10 Edw. 7. & 1 Geo. 5. c. 12	Supreme Court of Judicature Act 1910	The Supreme Court of Judicature Act, 1910.	The whole act.
1 & 2 Geo. 5. c. 57	Maritime Conventions Act 1911	The Maritime Conventions Act, 1911.	Section five so far as it relates to the High Court.
3 & 4 Geo. 5. c. 21	Appellate Jurisdiction Act 1913	The Appellate Jurisdiction Act, 1913.	Section two.
9 & 10 Geo. 5. c. 30	Official Solicitor Act 1919	The Official Solicitor Act, 1919.	The whole act.
10 & 11 Geo. 5. c. 81	Administration of Justice Act 1920	The Administration of Justice Act, 1920.	Sections one, five, six, seven and eight; section fifteen so far as it relates to the High Court; and sections nineteen and twenty.
11 & 12 Geo. 5. c. 24	Deceased Brother's Widow's Marriage Act 1921	The Deceased Brother's Widow's Marriage Act, 1921.	Subsection (2) of section one.
11 & 12 Geo. 5. c. 56	Supreme Court Officers (Retirement, Pensions, &c.) Act 1921	The Supreme Court Officers (Retirement, Pensions, &c.) Act, 1921.	The whole act.
13 & 14 Geo. 5. c. 19	Matrimonial Causes Act 1923	The Matrimonial Causes Act, 1923.	The whole act.
15 & 16 Geo. 5. c. 23	Administration of Estates Act 1925	The Administration of Estates Act, 1925.	Sections four, ten to fourteen, sixteen, and eighteen to twenty.
15 & 16 Geo. 5. c. 28	Administration of Justice Act 1925	The Administration of Justice Act, 1925.	Sections one to eighteen, twenty-one, twenty-four to twenty-six and Schedules one to three.

=== Section 99 ===
Section 99 of the act was replaced by section 84 of the Supreme Court Act 1981. The power conferred by this section was exercised by the Criminal Appeal (Reference of Points of Law) Rules 1973 (SI 1973/1114).

== Subsequent developments ==
The limited territorial extent of the act meant that several enactments were repealed for Ireland by subsequent Statute Law Revision Acts, including:

- The Statute Law Revision Act 1950 (14 Geo. 6. c. 6)

Part IX of the act was repealed by section 32(4) of, and part V of schedule 5 to, the Administration of Justice Act 1977, which came into force on 29 July 1977.

The whole act was repealed by section 152(4) of, and schedule 7 to, the Senior Courts Act 1981, which came into force on 1 January 1982.

== See also ==
- Supreme Court of Judicature Act

== Bibliography ==
- "The Supreme Court of Judicature (Consolidation) Act, 1925". The Complete Statutes of England. (Halsbury's Statutes of England). First Edition. Butterworth & Co Publishers Ltd. London. 1929. Volume 4: . Page 146 et seq.
- Halsbury's Statutes of England. Second Edition. Butterworth & Co Publishers Ltd. London. 1950. Volume 18. Page 472 et seq.
- Burnand, Burnett-Hall, Boland and Watts (eds). "Supreme Court of Judicature (Consolidation) Act, 1925". The Annual Practice 1949. (Sixty-ninth Annual Issue). Sweet & Maxwell. Stevens & Sons. Butterworth & Co Publishers Ltd. London. Volume 2. Pages 3161 to 3311.
- "Supreme Court of Judicature (Consolidation) Act, 1925". The Annual Practice 1938.
- W H Aggs (ed). Chitty's Statutes of Practical Utility. Arranged in alphabetical and chronological order, with notes and indexes. Vol. 24. Containing Statutes of Practical Utility passed in 1925 (other than the Property Acts). Sixth Edition. Sweet & Maxwell Ltd. Stevens & Sons Ltd. 1926.
- Paterson's Practical Statutes 1925
