= Court of Probate Act 1857 =

Act of the Parliament of the United Kingdom

Court of Probate Act 1857 (Note: The citation of this act by this short title was authorised by section 1 of, and the first schedule to, the Short Titles Act 1896. Due to the repeal of those provisions it is now authorised by section 19(2) of the Interpretation Act 1978. This short title was previously conferred on this act by section 3 of the Court of Probate Act 1858 (21 & 22 Vict. c. 95).)
- Act of Parliament
- Parliament of the United Kingdom
- Long title: An Act to amend the Law relating to Probates and Letters of Administration in England.
- Citation: 20 & 21 Vict. c. 77
- Territorial extent: United Kingdom

Dates
- Royal assent: 25 August 1857
- Commencement: 11 January 1858 (Note: Section 1.)
- Repealed: 1 January 1982
Other legislation
Amended by	Court of Probate Act 1858; Promissory Oaths Act 1871; Statute Law Revision Act 1875; Statute Law Revision and Civil Procedure Act 1881; Commissioners for Oaths Act 1889; Forgery Act 1913; Administration of Estates Act 1925; Supreme Court of Judicature (Consolidation) Act 1925; County Courts Act 1934; Administration of Justice Act 1965
Repealed by	Senior Courts Act 1981

Status: Repealed

Text of statute as originally enacted

The Court of Probate Act 1857 (20 & 21 Vict. c. 77) was an act of the Parliament of the United Kingdom that transferred responsibility for the granting of probate, and letters of administration, from the ecclesiastical courts of England and Wales to a new civil Court of Probate. It created a Principal Probate Registry in London (Somerset House) and a number of district probate registries. It was followed by the Court of Probate Act 1858 (21 & 22 Vict. c. 95)

== Subsequent developments ==
Section 7 of the act was repealed by section 1 of, and part II of schedule one to, the Promissory Oaths Act 1871 (34 & 35 Vict. c. 48), which came into force on 13 July 1871.

Sections 70–80 of the act were repealed by section 56 of, and part I of the second schedule to, the Administration of Estates Act 1925 (15 & 16 Geo. 5. c. 23), which came into force on 1 January 1926.

Sections 4, 13, 20–23, 29, 30 and 46–53, the words “ and the decision of the Court of Probate on such appeal shall be final,” in section 58, sections 59, 61–64 and 66–69, 87, 89–93, 110 and 119 of, and schedule A to, the act were repealed by section 226(1) of, and the sixth schedule to the Supreme Court of Judicature (Consolidation) Act 1925 (15 & 16 Geo. 5. c. 49), which came into force on 1 January 1926.

Sections 55–57 of the act were repealed by section 193(4) of, and the fifth schedule to, the County Courts Act 1934 (24 & 25 Geo. 5. c. 53), which came into force on 1 January 1937.

The whole act was repealed by section 152(4) of, and schedule 7 to, the Senior Courts Act 1981, which came into force on 1 January 1982.

== Bibliography ==
- Herber, Mark (2004). Ancestral Trails: The Complete Guide to British Genealogy and Family History, p. 214. Sutton Publishing.
