= National Probate Calendar =

Register of proved wills and administrations in England and Wales since 1858

The National Probate Calendar is a register of proved wills and administrations in England and Wales since 1858.

== History ==
The probate calendar was created by the Probate Registry, which was responsible for proving wills and administrations from 1858 following the enactment of the Court of Probate Act 1857. It replaced a system of ecclesiastical courts. The Principal Probate Registry was established in London in January 1858, along with district probate registries elsewhere in England and Wales.

== Content ==
Information typically included in the calendar is:

- Name of the deceased
- Date and place of death
- Value of the estate
- Names of administrators or executors
- Date of probate
