= Arbitration Act 1697 =

Act of the Parliament of England

Arbitration Act 1697 (Note: The citation of this act by this short title was authorised by section 5 of, and the second schedule to, the Statute Law Revision Act 1948. Due to the repeal of those provisions, it is now authorised by section 19(2) of the Interpretation Act 1978.)
- Act of Parliament
- Parliament of England
- Long title: An Act for determining Differences by Arbitration
- Citation: 9 Will. 3 c. 15 (Note: This is the citation in The Statutes of the Realm.); 9 & 10 Will. 3. c. 15 (Note: This is the citation in The Statutes at Large.)
- Territorial extent: England and Wales

Dates
- Royal assent: 16 May 1698
- Commencement: 11 May 1698 (Note: Section 1.)
- Repealed: 1 January 1890
Other legislation
Amended by	Statute Law Revision Act 1888
Repealed by	Arbitration Act 1889

Status: Repealed

Text of statute as originally enacted

The Arbitration Act 1697 (9 Will. 3. c. 15) was an act of the Parliament of England that first provided the legal basis for arbitration of disputes, although the practice of arbitration had been going on for many years before.

The statute was drafted by John Locke at the request of the Board of Trade.

== Subsequent developments ==
The whole act was repealed by the Arbitration Act 1889 (52 & 53 Vict. c. 49), which came into force on 1 January 1890. The act consolidated enactments relating to the arbitration of disputes in England and Wales.
