= Appellate Jurisdiction Act =

Stock short title used for UK legislation

Appellate Jurisdiction Act is a stock short title used for legislation in the United Kingdom which relates to the jurisdiction of appellate courts.

== List ==
- The Appellate Jurisdiction Act 1876 (39 & 40 Vict. c. 59)
- The Appellate Jurisdiction Act 1887 (50 & 51 Vict. c. 70)
- The Appellate Jurisdiction Act 1908 (8 Edw. 7. c. 51)
- The Appellate Jurisdiction Act 1913 (3 & 4 Geo. 5. c. 21)
- The Appellate Jurisdiction Act 1929 (19 & 20 Geo. 5. c. 8)
- The Appellate Jurisdiction Act 1947 (10 & 11 Geo. 6. c. 11)

== See also ==
- List of short titles
- Judicature Act
- Supreme Court of Judicature Act
