= Judicature Acts =

UK acts merging court systems, 1873–1899

Supreme Court of Judicature Act 1875 (Note: Section 1.)
- Act of Parliament
- Parliament of the United Kingdom
- Long title: An Act to amend and extend the Supreme Court of Judicature Act, 1873.
- Citation: 38 & 39 Vict. c. 77
- Territorial extent: United Kingdom

Dates
- Royal assent: 11 August 1875
- Commencement: 1 November 1875 (Note: Section 2.)
- Repealed: 1 January 1926
Other legislation
Amends	Bankruptcy Act 1869; Bankruptcy Repeal and Insolvent Court Act 1869; Court of Chancery (Funds) Act 1872; Supreme Court of Judicature Act 1873
Amended by	Appellate Jurisdiction Act 1876; Supreme Court of Judicature Act 1877; Supreme Court of Judicature (Officers) Act 1879; Statute Law Revision Act 1883; Bankruptcy Act 1883; Lunacy Act 1890; Supreme Court of Judicature Act 1902; Criminal Appeal Act 1907; Companies (Consolidation) Act 1908; Representation of the People Act 1918; Administration of Estates Act 1925
Repealed by	Supreme Court of Judicature (Consolidation) Act 1925
Relates to	Supreme Court of Judicature Act (Ireland) 1877

Status: Repealed

Text of statute as originally enacted

In the history of the courts of England and Wales, the Judicature Acts were a series of acts of the Parliament of the United Kingdom, beginning in the 1870s, which aimed to fuse the hitherto split system of courts of England and Wales. The first two acts were the Supreme Court of Judicature Act 1873 (36 & 37 Vict. c. 66) and the Supreme Court of Judicature Act 1875 (38 & 39 Vict. c. 77), with a further series of amending acts (12 in all by 1899).

By sections 3 and 4 of the Supreme Court of Judicature Act 1873 (36 & 37 Vict. c. 66), the Court of Chancery, the Court of King's Bench (known as the Queen's Bench when there is a female sovereign), the Court of Common Pleas, the Court of Exchequer, the High Court of Admiralty, the Court of Probate, and the Court of Divorce and Matrimonial Causes were consolidated into the Supreme Court of Judicature, subdivided into two courts: the "High Court of Justice" ("High Court"), with (broadly speaking) original jurisdiction, and the "Court of Appeal". Besides this restructuring, the objects of the act were threefold:

- to combine the historically separate courts of common law and equity;
- to establish for all divisions of the new Supreme Court a uniform system of pleading and procedure; and
- to provide for the enforcement of the same rule of law in those cases where equity and common law recognised different rules.

The enactment was bold and revolutionary. By one section, the King's Bench, the Common Pleas (in which only serjeants formerly had the right of audience), and the Exchequer, and all their jurisdiction, whether criminal, legal, or equitable, were vested in the new court. The fusion of the systems of law and equity was not complete, however, as the Chancery (equity) division retained a distinct existence within the new court from the King's Bench (common law) division, having a certain range of legal questions under its exclusive control, and possessing to a certain extent a peculiar machinery of its own for carrying its decrees into execution. Nevertheless, all actions could now for the first time be initiated in a single High Court, and (subject to such special assignments of business as mentioned) could be tried in any of its divisions.

== Common law and equity ==
The procedure of the common law courts had developed along highly technical and stylised lines. For example, to bring an action in the common law courts a litigant had to file a "writ" chosen from a set of standard forms. The court would only recognise certain "forms of action", and this led to the widespread use of legal fictions, with litigants disguising their claims when they did not fit into a standard recognised "form". The emphasis on rigid adherence to established forms led to substantial injustice.

On the other hand, the Court of Chancery (a court of equity) ran separately and parallel to the common law courts, and emphasised the need to "do justice" on the basis of the Lord Chancellor's conscience, softening the blunt instrument of the common law. However, by the nineteenth century proceedings before the Court of Chancery often dragged on and on, with cases not being decided for years at a time (a problem that was parodied by Charles Dickens in the fictional case of Jarndyce and Jarndyce in Bleak House). Also, the practice of the court departed from the original principle of the Lord Chancellor's conscience, wary of its legal superiority, clarified for once and for all 1615, wherever it conflicted with the common law. The court undertook self-restraint to safeguard its position. It elaborated the maxims of equity, many centuries old, that restrict its jurisdiction to certain fields of law, impose preconditions for suits/applications and curtail its remedies (particularly damages) which equity might award if there were no common law courts or statute.

The existence of these two separate systems in some of the more common areas of law enabled each party to go "forum shopping", selecting whichever of the two systems would most likely give judgment in his or her favour. A wealthy loser in one court would often try a court in the other system, for good measure.

The solution adopted by the Judicature Acts of 1873 and 1875 was to amalgamate the courts into one Supreme Court of Judicature which was directed to administer both law and equity. Pleadings became more relaxed, with the emphasis shifting from the "form" of action to the "cause" (or a set of causes) of action. Writs for action were filled out for a litigant stating facts, without any necessity of pigeonholing them into specific forms. The same court was now able to apply rules of the common law and the rules of equity, depending on what the substantial justice of a case required, and depending on what specific area of law the pleadings involved. The result was that, when the issues arising from the causes of action were decided in favour of one party, that party got relief. In 1978, over 100 years having passed from the passing of the acts, Lord Denning observed that during that time,

the streams of common law and equity have flown together and combined so as to be indistinguishable the one from the other. We have no longer to ask ourselves what would the courts of common law or courts of equity have done before the Judicature Act? We have to ask ourselves: what should we do now so as to ensure fair dealing between the parties?

== Overview ==
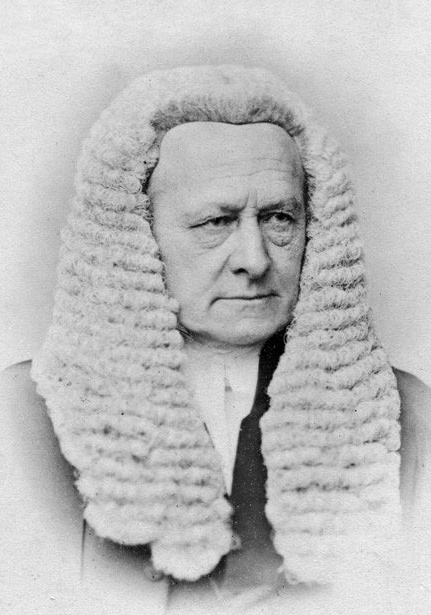
Sir Fitzroy Kelly was the last leading Lord Chief Baron of the Exchequer.

There were originally three common law divisions of the High Court corresponding with the three former courts of common law. However, after the deaths of Lord Chief Baron Kelly (on 17 September 1880), and Lord Chief Justice Cockburn (on 10 November 1880), the Common Pleas and Exchequer divisions were consolidated (by an Order in Council of 10 December 1880) with the Queen's Bench division into a single division, under the presidency of the Lord Chief Justice of England, to whom, by the Judicature Act 1881 s. 25, all the statutory jurisdiction of the Chief Baron and the Chief Justice of the Common Pleas was transferred. The High Court, therefore, came to consist of the Chancery division, the common law division (known as the Queen's Bench division), and the Probate, Divorce and Admiralty division. To the Queen's Bench division was also attached, by an order of the Lord Chancellor dated 1 January 1884, the business of the London Court of Bankruptcy.

The keystone of the structure created by the Judicature Acts was a strong court of appeal. The House of Lords remained the last court of appeal, as before the acts, but its judicial functions were transferred in practice to an appellate committee, consisting of the lord chancellor and other peers who had held high judicial office, and certain Lords of Appeal in Ordinary created by the Appellate Jurisdiction Act 1876.

The High Court and Court of Appeal were formerly referred to as comprising the Supreme Court of Judicature, a concept wholly distinct from the current Supreme Court of the United Kingdom

== Pleading ==
The most important matter dealt with by the rules is the mode of pleading. The authors of the Judicature Act had before them two systems of pleading, both of which were open to criticism. The common law pleadings (it was said) did not state the facts on which the pleader relied, but only the legal aspect of the facts or the inferences from them, while the chancery pleadings were lengthy, tedious and to a large extent irrelevant and useless.

There was some exaggeration in both statements. In pursuing the fusion of law and equity which was the dominant legal idea of law reformers of that period, the framers of the first set of rules devised a system which they thought would meet the defects of both systems, and be appropriate for both the common-law and the chancery divisions. In a normal case, the plaintiff delivered his statement of claim, in which he was to set forth concisely the facts on which he relied, and the relief which he asked. The defendant then delivered his statement of defence, which he was to say whether he admitted or denied the plaintiff's facts (every averment not traversed being taken to be admitted), and any additional facts and legal defences on which he relied. The plaintiff might then reply, and the defendant rejoin, and so on until the pleaders had exhausted themselves. This system of pleading was not a bad one if accompanied by the right of either party to demur to his opponent's pleading, i.e. to say, "admitting all your averments of fact to be true, you still have no cause of action", or "defence" (as the case may be).

It may be, however, that the authors of the new system were too intent on uniformity when they abolished the common-law pleading, which, shorn of its abuses (as it had been by the Common Law Procedure Acts), was an admirable instrument for defining the issue between the parties though unsuited for the more complicated cases which are tried in chancery, and it might possibly have been better to try the new system in the first instance in the chancery division only.

It should be added that the rules contain provisions for actions being tried without pleadings if the defendant does not require a statement of claim, and for the plaintiff in an action of debt obtaining immediate judgment unless the defendant gets leave to defend. In the chancery division there are of course no pleadings in those matters which by the rules can be disposed of by summons in chambers instead of by ordinary suit as formerly.

The judges seem to have been dissatisfied with the effect of their former rules, for in 1883 they issued a fresh set of consolidated rules, which, with subsequent amendments, are those now in force. By these rules a further attempt was made to prune the exuberance of pleading. Concise forms of statement of claim and defence were given in the appendix for adoption by the pleader. It is true that these forms do not display a high standard of excellence in draftsmanship, and it was said that many of them were undoubtedly demurrable, but that was not of much importance.

Demurrers were abolished, and instead it was provided that any point of law raised by the pleadings should be disposed of at or after the trial, provided that by consent or order of the court they might be set down and disposed of before the trial (Order xxv. rules I, 2). This, in the opinion of Lord Davey in 1902, was a disastrous change. The right of either party to challenge his opponent in limine, either where the question between them was purely one of law, or where even the view of the facts taken and alleged by his opponent did not constitute a cause of action or defence, was a most valuable one, and tended to the curtailment of both the delay and the expense of litigation. Any possibility of abuse by frivolous or technical demurrers (as undoubtedly was formerly the case) had been met by powers of amendment and the infliction of costs.

Many of the most important questions of law had been decided on demurrer both in common law and chancery. Lord Davey considered that demurrer was a useful and satisfactory mode of trying questions in chancery (on bill and demurrer), and it was frequently adopted in preference to a special case, which requires the statement of facts to be agreed to by both parties and was consequently more difficult and expensive. It is obvious that a rule which makes the normal time for decision of questions at law the trial or subsequently, and a preliminary decision the exception, and such exception dependent on the consent of both parties or an order of the court, is a poor substitute for a demurrer as of right, and it has proved so in practice. The editors of the Yearly Practice for 1901 (Muir Mackenzie, Lushington and Fox) said (p. 272): "Points of law raised by the pleadings are usually disposed of at the trial or on further consideration after the trial of the issues of fact," that is to say, after the delay, worry and expense of a trial of disputed questions of fact which after all may turn out to be unnecessary.

The abolition of demurrers has also (it is believed) had a prejudicial effect on the standard of legal accuracy and knowledge required in practitioners. Formerly the pleader had the fear of a demurrer before him. Nowadays, he need not stop to think whether his cause of action or defence will hold water or not, and anything which is not obviously frivolous or vexatious will do by way of pleading for the purpose of the trial and for getting the opposite party into the box.

== Juries ==
Another change was made by the rules of 1883, which was regarded by some common law lawyers as revolutionary. Formerly every issue of fact in a common law action, including the amount of damage, had to be decided by the verdict of a jury. "The effect of the rules of 1883," said Lord Lindley, who was a member of the rule committee, "was to make trial without a jury the normal mode of trial, except where trial with a jury is ordered under rules 6 or 7a, or may be had without an order under rule 2". The effect of the rules may be thus summarised:

- In the Chancery division no trial by jury unless ordered by the judge.
- Generally the judge could order trial without a jury of any cause or issue, which before the Judicature Act might have been so tried without consent of parties, or which involves prolonged investigation of documents or accounts, or scientific or local investigation.
- Either party had a right to a jury in actions of slander, libel, false imprisonment, malicious prosecution, seduction or breach of promise of marriage, upon notice without order;
- or in any other action, by order.
- Subject as above, actions were to be tried without a jury unless the judge, of his own motion, otherwise orders.

== Abandonment ==
Among the specific changes to procedure that occurred as a result of enactment of the Judicature Acts was one impacting on the matter of "abandonment of an action". Such an abandonment involves the discontinuance of proceedings commenced in the High Court, typically emerging because a plaintiff is convinced that he will not succeed in a civil action. Prior to the 1875 act, considerable latitude was allowed as to the time when a suitor might abandon his action, and yet preserve his right to bring another action on the same suit (see nonsuit); but since 1875 this right has been considerably curtailed, and a plaintiff who has delivered his reply (see pleading), and afterwards wishes to abandon his action, can generally obtain leave so to do only on condition of bringing no further proceedings in the matter.

== Other changes ==
Further steps have been taken with a view to simplification of procedure. By Order xxx. rule i (as amended in 1897), a summons, called a summons for directions, has to be taken out by a plaintiff immediately after the appearance of the defendant, and upon such summons an order is to be made respecting pleadings, and a number of interlocutory proceedings. To make such an order at that early stage would seem to demand a prescience and intelligent anticipation of future events which can hardly be expected of a master, or even a judge in chambers, except in simple cases, involving a single issue of law or fact which the parties are agreed in presenting to the court. The effect of the rule is that the plaintiff cannot deliver his statement of claim, or take any step in the action without the leave of the judge. In Chancery cases the order usually made is that the plaintiff deliver his statement of claim, and the rest of the summons stand over, and the practical effect is merely to add a few pounds to the costs. It may be doubted whether, as applied to the majority of actions, the rule does not proceed on wrong lines, and whether it would not be better to leave the parties, who know the exigencies of their case better even than a judge in chambers, to proceed in their own way, subject to stringent provisions for immediate payment of the costs occasioned by unnecessary, vexatious, or dilatory proceedings. The order does not apply to admiralty cases or to proceedings under the order next mentioned.

The Supreme Court of Judicature Act (Ireland) 1877 (40 & 41 Vict. c. 57) followed the same lines as the English acts: the pre-existing courts were consolidated into a Supreme Court of Judicature, consisting of a High Court of Justice and a Court of Appeal. The Judicature Acts did not affect the Scottish judicial system, but the Appellate Jurisdiction Act included the Court of Session among the courts from which an appeal would lie to the House of Lords.

== Subsequent developments ==
Section 10 of the act was repealed by section 56 of, and part I of the second schedule to, the Administration of Estates Act 1925 (15 & 16 Geo. 5. c. 23).

The whole act was repealed by section 226(1) of, and the sixth schedule to the Supreme Court of Judicature (Consolidation) Act 1925 (15 & 16 Geo. 5. c. 49).

== See also ==
- For a more detailed account of the composition of the various courts, see Court of Appeal in Chancery, Court of Chancery, King's Bench, Court of Common Pleas (England), Exchequer of Pleas, Court of Probate, Court for Divorce and Matrimonial Causes, and Admiralty court#Admiralty Courts in England and Wales.
- Common law
- Courts of England and Wales
- Equity (law)
  - Earl of Oxford's Case
- Judicature Act
