= Appellate Jurisdiction Act 1876 =

Act of the Parliament of the United Kingdom

Appellate Jurisdiction Act 1876 (Note: Section 1.)
- Act of Parliament
- Parliament of the United Kingdom
- Long title: An Act for amending the Law in respect of the Appellate Jurisdiction of the House of Lords; and for other purposes.
- Citation: 39 & 40 Vict. c. 59
- Territorial extent: United Kingdom; Isle of Man

Dates
- Royal assent: 11 August 1876
- Commencement: 1 November 1876 (except where otherwise expressly provided) (Note: Section 2.)
- Repealed: United Kingdom: 1 October 2009 (Note: The Constitutional Reform Act 2005 (Commencement No. 11) Order 2009 (SI 2009/1604).); Isle of Man: 25 July 1991
Other legislation
Amends	Church Discipline Act 1840; Judicial Committee Act 1871; Supreme Court of Judicature Act 1875
Amended by	Supreme Court of Judicature (Officers) Act 1879; Statute Law Revision Act 1883; Appeal (Formâ Pauperis) Act 1893; Supreme Court of Judicature (Consolidation) Act 1925; Ecclesiastical Jurisdiction Measure 1963; Administration of Justice Act 1965; Justices of the Peace Act 1968; Statute Law (Repeals) Act 1973; Statute Law (Repeals) Act 1989; Justice (Northern Ireland) Act 2002
Repealed by	United Kingdom: Constitutional Reform Act 2005; Isle of Man: Statute Law Revision (Isle of Man) Act 1991
Relates to	Supreme Court of Judicature Act 1873

Status: Repealed

Text of statute as originally enacted

Revised text of statute as amended

The Appellate Jurisdiction Act 1876 (39 & 40 Vict. c. 59) was an act of the Parliament of the United Kingdom that altered the judicial functions of the House of Lords by allowing senior judges to sit in the House of Lords as life peers with the rank of baron, known as Lords of Appeal in Ordinary. The first person to be made a law lord under its terms was Sir Colin Blackburn on 16 October 1876, who became Baron Blackburn.

== Subsequent developments ==
In section 25 of the act, in the definition of "high judicial office" the words "or of paid Judge of the Judicial Committee of the Privy Council" were repealed by section 8(2) of, and part I of schedule 5 to, the Justices of the Peace Act 1968, which came into force on 25 October 1968.

In section 6 of the act, the words from " and shall continue " to " Crown " were repealed by section 1(1) of, and part I of schedule 1 to, the Statute Law (Repeals) Act 1973, which came into force on 18 July 1973.

Section 23 of the act was repealed by section 1(1) of, and part VI of schedule 1 to, the Statute Law (Repeals) Act 1989, which came into force on 16 November 1989.

The whole act was repealed for the Isle of Man by section 1(2) of, and schedule 2 to, the Statute Law Revision (Isle of Man) Act 1991, which came into force on 25 July 1991.

The whole act was repealed for the United Kingdom by sections 145 of, and 146 of, and schedule 17 and paragraph 9 of part 5 of schedule 18 to, the Constitutional Reform Act 2005, which came into effect on 1 October 2009. The act transferred the judicial functions from the House of Lords to the Supreme Court of the United Kingdom.

Following the creation of the Supreme Court of the United Kingdom, the practice of appointing Lords of Appeal in Ordinary was discontinued. The last person to be made a law lord was Sir Brian Kerr on 29 June 2009, who became Baron Kerr of Tonaghmore.

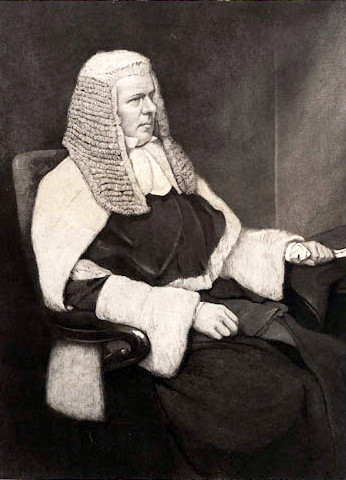
Sir Colin Blackburn (1813–1896), the first law lord appointed under the Appellate Jurisdiction Act 1876

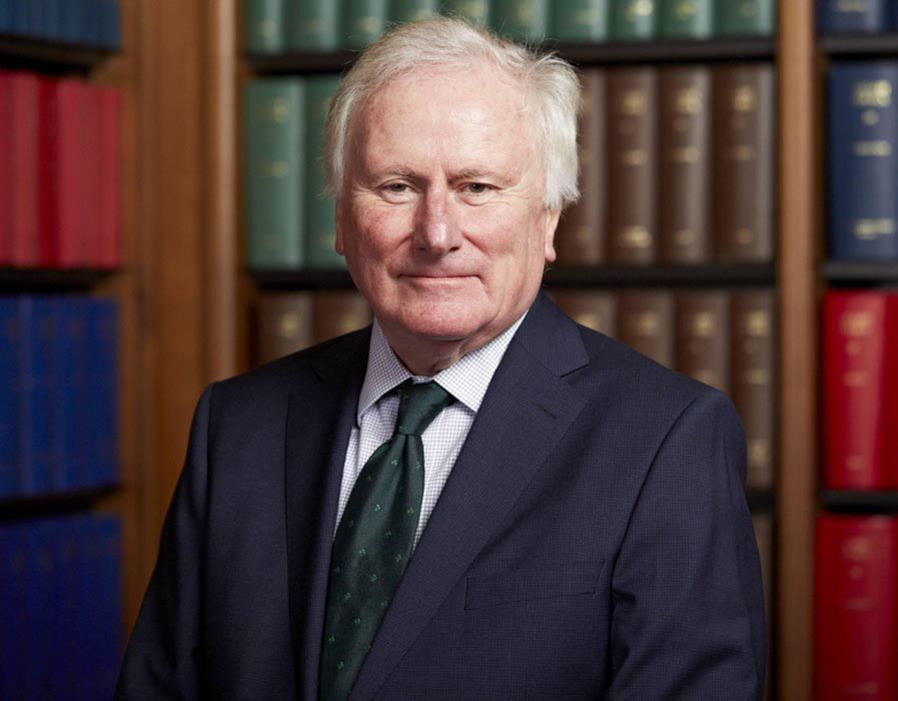
Sir Brian Kerr (1949–2020), the last law lord appointed under the Appellate Jurisdiction Act 1876

== See also ==
- Appellate Jurisdiction Act
- Judicature Act
- List of law life peerages and List of Lords of Appeal in Ordinary
