= Supreme Court of Judicature Act 1873 =

Act of the Parliament of the United Kingdom reorganising the English court system

Supreme Court of Judicature Act 1873 (Note: Section 1.)
- Act of Parliament
- Parliament of the United Kingdom
- Long title: An Act for the constitution of a Supreme Court, and for other purposes relating to the better Administration of Justice in England; and to authorise the transfer to the Appellate Division of such Supreme Court of the Jurisdiction of the Judicial Committee of Her Majesty's Privy Council.
- Citation: 36 & 37 Vict. c. 66
- Introduced by: William Wood, 1st Baron Hatherley (Lords)
- Territorial extent: United Kingdom

Dates
- Royal assent: 5 August 1873
- Commencement: 1 November 1875 (Note: Section 2 originally provided that the act would come into force on 2 November 1874. Section 2 of the act was repealed and replaced by section 2 of the Supreme Court of Judicature (Commencement) Act 1874 (37 & 38 Vict. c. 83). Section 2 of the Supreme Court of Judicature Act 1875 (38 & 39 Vict. c. 77) provided that the act would come into force on 1 November 1875, except any provision of that act declared to take effect before the commencement of the act and except sections 20, 21 and 25, which would come into force on 1 November 1876.)
- Repealed: 1 October 1966
Other legislation
Amended by	Supreme Court of Judicature (Commencement) Act 1874; Supreme Court of Judicature Act 1875; Appellate Jurisdiction Act 1876; Supreme Court of Judicature Act 1877; Supreme Court of Judicature (Officers) Act 1879; Statute Law Revision Act 1883; Supreme Court of Judicature Act 1884; Arbitration Act 1889; Law of Property Act 1925; Supreme Court of Judicature (Consolidation) Act 1925; Limitation Act 1939; Rules of the Supreme Court (Revision) 1962; Administration of Justice Act 1965
Repealed by	Rules of the Supreme Court (Revision) 1965
Relates to	Appellate Jurisdiction Act 1876; Supreme Court of Judicature Act 1877

Status: Repealed

Text of statute as originally enacted

Supreme Court of Judicature (Commencement) Act 1874 (Note: Section 3.)
- Act of Parliament
- Parliament of the United Kingdom
- Long title: An Act for delaying the coming into operation of the Supreme Court of Judicature Act, 1873.
- Citation: 37 & 38 Vict. c. 83
- Territorial extent: United Kingdom

Dates
- Royal assent: 7 August 1874
- Commencement: 7 August 1874 (Note: The Acts of Parliament (Commencement) Act 1793.)
- Repealed: 22 September 1893
Other legislation
Amends	Supreme Court of Judicature Act 1873
Amended by	Statute Law Revision Act 1883
Repealed by	Statute Law Revision (No. 2) Act 1893
Relates to	Supreme Court of Judicature Act 1875

Status: Repealed

Text of statute as originally enacted

The Supreme Court of Judicature Act 1873 (36 & 37 Vict. c. 66) (sometimes known as the Judicature Act 1873) was an act of the Parliament of the United Kingdom in 1873. It reorganised the English court system to establish the High Court and the Court of Appeal, and also originally provided for the abolition of the judicial functions of the House of Lords with respect to England. It would have retained those functions in relation to Scotland and Ireland for the time being. However, the Gladstone Liberal government fell in 1874 before the act entered into force, and the succeeding Disraeli Conservative government suspended the entry into force of the act by means of the Supreme Court of Judicature (Commencement) Act 1874 (37 & 38 Vict. c. 83) and the Supreme Court of Judicature Act 1875 (38 & 39 Vict. c. 77).

== Background ==
The legislation for the act was drafted by the Judicature Commission which was chaired by Lord Chancellor Hatherley. Other members of the commission included judge George Bramwell, lawyers Sir John Hollams, Sir Robert Collier, and John Burgess Karslake, and parliament member George Ward Hunt.

== Liberal view ==
One of the reasons that the Liberal government under Gladstone wanted to abolish the judicial aspect of the House of Lords was that it was concerned for the poor quality of judges at this court. Judges at the House of Lords secured their position by mere virtue of the fact that their fathers were hereditary peers and so individuals would automatically inherit seats in the upper house rather than securing their position through merit. Therefore, some of the best lawyers in the land were prohibited from sitting as judges in the upper house simply because of their parentage.

== Conservative view ==
However, under the Conservative government, the 1874 and 1875 acts retained the judicial aspect of the House of Lords and ensured the quality of judicial appointments to the House of Lords by legislating under the Appellate Jurisdiction Act 1876 (39 & 40 Vict. c. 59), for the mechanism of law lords. The reigning monarch could appoint any individual to be a peer and thus a judge in the House of Lords. These judicial life peers would hold seats only for the duration of their life; their seat would not pass through their inheritance to their son. Thus, Queen Victoria and subsequent monarchs were able to appoint leading lawyers to adjudicate in the House of Lords by making them life peers.

== Provisions ==
=== Short title, commencement and extent ===
Section 1 of the act provided that the act may be cited the "Supreme Court of Judicature Act, 1873".

Section 2 of the act provided that the act would come into force on 2 November 1874. This act was repealed and replaced was repealed and replaced by section 2 of the Supreme Court of Judicature (Commencement) Act 1874 (37 & 38 Vict. c. 83). Section 2 of the Supreme Court of Judicature Act 1875 (38 & 39 Vict. c. 77) provided that the act would come into force on 1 November 1875, except any provision of that act declared to take effect before the commencement of the act and except sections 20, 21 and 25, which would come into force on 1 November 1876.

The preamble to the act provided that the act would extend to England and Wales.

== Appellate Jurisdiction Act 1876 ==
Lord Cairns, Disraeli's Lord Chancellor, sought to remove the House of Lords jurisdiction for Scottish and Irish appeals as well, which would have completely removed its judicial jurisdiction. However, the Lord Chancellor could not muster the necessary support in Parliament for the bill as originally proposed in 1874 or when it was reintroduced in 1875. Finally, when it became clear that the English legal profession was firmly opposed to the reform proposals, the Appellate Jurisdiction Act 1876 (39 & 40 Vict. c. 59) removed the provisions for the abolition of the judicial functions of the House of Lords, although it retained the provisions that established the High Court and the Court of Appeal.

== Subsequent developments ==
The whole act, except sections 25(2), 46, 64 and 66 of the act, was repealed by section 226(1) of, and the sixth schedule to the Supreme Court of Judicature (Consolidation) Act 1925 (15 & 16 Geo. 5. c. 49), 1 January 1926.

Section 25(2) of the act was repealed by section 34(4) of, and the schedule to, the Limitation Act 1939 (2 & 3 Geo. 6. c. 21), which came into force on 1 May 1940.

Section 46 of the act was repealed by section 34(1) of, and schedule 2 to, the Administration of Justice Act 1965, which came into force on 27 April 1965.

Section 64 of the act was repealed by section 5 of, and schedule 5 to, the Rules of the Supreme Court (Revision) 1962 (SI 1962/2145), which came into force on 1 January 1964.

Section 66 of the act, being the only repealed section of the act, was repealed by section 1(2) of, and schedule 2 of the Rules of the Supreme Court (Revision) 1965 (SI 1965/1776), which 1 October 1966.

== See also ==
- Judicature Act
- Judicature Acts (1873 and 1875)
