= Supreme Court of Judicature Act (Ireland) 1877 =

Act of the Parliament of the United Kingdom reforming the Irish court system

Supreme Court of Judicature Act (Ireland) 1877 (Note: Section 1. However, the Act is often cited instead as the "Supreme Court of Judicature (Ireland) Act 1877".)
- Act of Parliament
- Parliament of the United Kingdom
- Long title: An Act for the constitution of a Supreme Court of Judicature, and for other purposes relating to the better Administration of Justice in Ireland.
- Citation: 40 & 41 Vict. c. 57
- Territorial extent: United Kingdom

Dates
- Royal assent: 14 August 1877
- Commencement: 1 January 1878, except where otherwise expressly provided (Note: Section 2.)
- Repealed: United Kingdom: 18 April 1979 (Note: The Judicature (Northern Ireland) Act 1978 (Commencement No. 4) Order 1979 (SI 1979/422).)
Other legislation
Amended by	Supreme Court of Judicature Act (Ireland) 1877 Amendment Act 1878; Supreme Court of Judicature (Ireland) Act 1882; Statute Law Revision Act 1883; Supreme Court of Judicature (Ireland) Act 1887; Supreme Court of Judicature (Ireland) Amendment Act 1888; Companies (Consolidation) Act 1908; Representation of the People Act 1918; Courts of Justice Act 1924; Supreme Court (Northern Ireland) Act 1942; Statute Law Revision Act 1950; Statute Law Revision Act 1953; Statute Law Revision Act 1963
Repealed by	United Kingdom: Judicature (Northern Ireland) Act 1978
Relates to	Supreme Court of Judicature Act 1873; Supreme Court of Judicature Act 1875

Status: Repealed

Status
- Republic of Ireland: Amended

Text of statute as originally enacted

The Supreme Court of Judicature Act (Ireland) 1877 (40 & 41 Vict. c. 57), often cited as the Supreme Court of Judicature (Ireland) Act 1877, was an act of the Parliament of the United Kingdom that brought about a major reorganisation of the superior courts in Ireland. It created a Supreme Court of Judicature, comprising the High Court of Justice in Ireland and the Court of Appeal in Ireland. It mirrored in Ireland the changes which the Supreme Court of Judicature Act 1873 (36 & 37 Vict. c. 66) had made in the courts of England and Wales.

== Provisions ==
The act marked the fusion of the administration of common law and equity in Ireland, although not a merger of the jurisdictions themselves. Prior to the act coming into force a litigant had to sue in equity in the Court of Chancery and at common law in the common law courts of the Common Pleas, the Exchequer, and the Queen's Bench. Mirroring earlier legislation applying to England and Wales, the act merged these four courts to become a single High Court of Justice in Ireland; the old courts continued as divisions of the new court. Amending legislation later abolished all but the King's Bench Division and Chancery Division of the High Court.

The act also created a new Court of Appeal in Ireland.

== Partition and subsequent developments ==
The "Supreme Court of Judicature in Ireland" that was created by the 1877 act was abolished by section 38 of the Government of Ireland Act 1920 (10 & 11 Geo. 5. c. 67). In its place were established a separate Supreme Court of Judicature for each of Northern Ireland and Southern Ireland, together with an overarching "High Court of Appeal for Ireland" with appellate jurisdiction for the whole of Ireland. The two new Supreme Courts of Judicature were constituted on a similar basis to the court they replaced, with both being made up of a High Court of Justice and a Court of Appeal (ss. 39, 40).

=== Irish Free State and the Republic of Ireland ===
The Irish Free State was established on 6 December 1922, comprising the territory which had been designated as Southern Ireland. Article 75 of the Constitution of the Irish Free State carried over the existing court structure for Southern Ireland; this included the courts established under the 1920 act, with the exception of the High Court of Appeal for Ireland, which was abolished by the Irish Free State (Consequential Provisions) Act 1922 (13 Geo. 5 Sess. 2. c. 2), an act of the Parliament of the United Kingdom. Subsequently, the Courts of Justice Act 1924 transferred the jurisdiction of the High Court of Justice to the court of the same name created by that act, and the jurisdiction of the Court of Appeal to the Supreme Court of Justice. Both these jurisdictions have been continued by subsequent legislation.

The act has not been repealed in the Republic of Ireland and thus remains part of its law; the act was expressly preserved by the Statute Law Revision Act 2007.

== Subsequent developments ==
Section 28(9) of the act was repealed by section 1(1) of, and the first schedule to, the Statute Law Revision Act 1950 (14 Geo. 6. c. 6), which came into force on 23 May 1950.

The following provisions were repealed by section 1 of, and the first schedule to, the Statute Law Revision Act 1953 (2 & 3 Eliz. 2. c. 5), which came into force on 18 December 1953.

- In section 6, the words from " The Lord Chancellor shall " to " manner as heretofore "; the words " the Master of the Rolls " " and the Lord Chief Baron ", each where occurring for the second time; the words " other than the Lord Chancellor and the Judges last-mentioned ", and the words from " The Lord Chancellor for the time being " to the end of the section.
- In section 10, the words from the beginning of the section to " Lord Chief Baron of the Exchequer "; the words " ex-officio Judges and "; " Lord Chancellor or of "; " Master of the Rolls,"; " or Chief Baron of the Exchequer "; and the words from " The Lord Chancellor for the time being " to the end of the section.
- In section 13, the words " other than the Lord Chancellor,"; " (other than the Lord Chancellor) " and the words from " The oaths to be taken " to " the same as heretofore ". In section eighteen, the words " and to "; " the Lord Chief Baron of the Exchequer "; the words from " four thousand six hundred " to " appointed under the said Act "; and the words from " Provided always," to " before the passing of this Act ".
- In section 19, the words " other than the Lord Chancellor,".
- In section 34, the words from " consisting of such Judges respectively " to the end of the section.
- In section 41, the words " serjeants-at-law, or " and the words from " nor for more than one Judge " to the end of the section. In section forty-two, the words " or the Chancery Regulation (Ireland) Act, 1862,".
- In section 43, the words " and Exchequer "; the letter " s " at the end of the word " Divisions ".
- In section 46, the words " and in the meantime until such Rules shall be made,"; the words " and Exchequer "; the letter " s " at the end of the word " Divisions "; the word " respectively "; and the words " either the Lord Chancellor or ".
- In section 47, the words " and in the meantime until such rules shall be made,".
- In section 51, the words from " in which case an appeal " to the end of the section.
- In section 60, the words from the beginning of the section to the words " Judges of the same respectively " where occurring for the second time.
- In section 61, the words from " if made before the commencement " to " after the commencement of this Act," where occurring for the second time.
- In section 70, the words " the Lord Chancellor, with the concurrence of ".
- Section 72.
- In section 73, the words from " the Chief Justice " to " Lord Chancellor shall be one ".

In section 75, the words from " The officers connected with the office " to " the officers of the Receiver Master." and from " The duties imposed upon the Land Judges " to the end of the section.

- Section 80.
- In section 81, the words from " or the position salaries " to the end of the section.
- In section 82, the words from the beginning of the section to " if this Act had not passed; and "; and from " but so that no existing " to the end of the section.
- Section 83.
- In section 84, the words from " with the advice and consent " to " or any one of them, and ".

The following provisions were repealed by section 1 of, and the schedule to, the Statute Law Revision Act 1963, which came into force on 31 July 1963.

- In section 20, the words " or the growing produce thereof ".
- In section 73, the words from the beginning to " Supreme Court " (where first occurring), the words " notwithstanding that the patronage thereof may be vested in an existing judge " and the words " Subject to the provisions of this Act preserving their patronage to existing judges ".
- In section 85, the words " or out of the growing produce thereof ".

The whole act was repealed by section 122(2) of, and part I of schedule 7 to, the Judicature (Northern Ireland) Act 1978, which came into force on 18 April 1979.

However, that act established a new Supreme Court of Judicature that is of largely the same shape as that established under the 1920 act, although it also includes a Crown Court in Northern Ireland (which tries indictable offences). Since the establishment of the Supreme Court of the United Kingdom, Northern Ireland's Supreme Court has been known as the Court of Judicature in Northern Ireland.

== Bibliography ==
- Pulling, Alexander (1904). "Supreme Court (Ireland)". The statutory rules and orders revised, being the statutory rules and orders (other than those of a local, personal, or temporary character) in force on December 31, 1903. Vol. 13 (2nd ed.). London: H.M.S.O.
- "Supreme Court of Judicature Act (Ireland) 1877". Irish Statute Book.
