= Supreme Court of Judicature (Ireland) Act 1887 =

Act of the Parliament of the United Kingdom

Supreme Court of Judicature (Ireland) Act 1887 (Note: Section 6.)
- Act of Parliament
- Parliament of the United Kingdom
- Long title: An Act to amend the Supreme Court of Judicature Act (Ireland), 1877.
- Citation: 50 & 51 Vict. c. 6
- Territorial extent: United Kingdom

Dates
- Royal assent: 23 May 1887
- Commencement: 23 May 1887 (Note: The Acts of Parliament (Commencement) Act 1793.)
- Repealed: 18 April 1979 (Note: The Judicature (Northern Ireland) Act 1978 (Commencement No. 4) Order 1979 (SI 1979/422).)
Other legislation
Amends	Supreme Court of Judicature Act (Ireland) 1877
Amended by	Administration of Justice Act 1965
Repealed by	Judicature (Northern Ireland) Act 1978

Status: Repealed

Text of statute as originally enacted

The Supreme Court of Judicature (Ireland) Act 1887 (50 & 51 Vict. c. 6) was an act of the Parliament of the United Kingdom which amended the Supreme Court of Judicature Act (Ireland) 1877 (40 & 41 Vict. c. 57).

Section 1 of the act abolished the distinction between certain judges of the High Court of Justice in Ireland. Section 2 transferred a number of powers from other judges to the Lord Chief Justice of Ireland.

== Subsequent developments ==
The whole act was repealed by section 122(2) of, and part I of schedule 7 to, the Judicature (Northern Ireland) Act 1978, which came into force on 18 April 1979.
