= Lords of Appeal in Ordinary =

1876–2009 British judicial office

Lords of Appeal in Ordinary, (Note: In ordinary is an archaic English term meaning that a position is permanent (as opposed to extraordinary, a temporary appointment).) colloquially known as Law Lords, were judges appointed to the House of Lords of the United Kingdom to carry out the House's judicial functions under the Appellate Jurisdiction Act 1876, which included serving as the final court of appeal for most domestic matters.

On 1 October 2009, the Appellate Jurisdiction Act 1876 was repealed owing to the creation of the Supreme Court of the United Kingdom. The House of Lords thus lost its judicial functions and the power to create law life peers lapsed, although the validity of extant life peerages created under the Appellate Jurisdiction Act 1876 remains intact. Lords of Appeal in Ordinary who were in office on 1 October 2009 automatically became Justices of the Supreme Court of the United Kingdom. At the same time, those Supreme Court justices who already held seats in the House of Lords lost their right to speak and vote there until after retirement as Justices of the Supreme Court.

== Background ==
The House of Lords historically had jurisdiction to hear appeals from the lower courts. Theoretically, the appeals were to the King (or Queen) in Parliament, but the House of Commons did not participate in judicial matters. The House of Lords did not necessarily include judges, but it was formerly attended by several judges who gave their opinions when the Lords desired. They did not, however, have the power to vote in the House.

In January 1856, to permit legally qualified members to exercise the House's appellate functions without allowing their heirs to swell the size of the House, Sir James Parke, a judge, was created a life peer as Baron Wensleydale. As the House of Lords eventually decided that a peerage "for the term of his natural life" did not allow him to sit and vote, Parke also received a hereditary peerage on 23 July 1856.

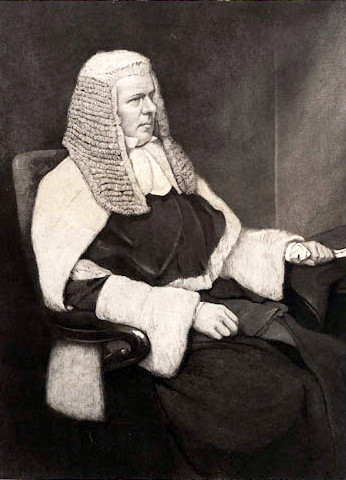
Sir Colin Blackburn, the first law lord appointed under the Appellate Jurisdiction Act 1876.

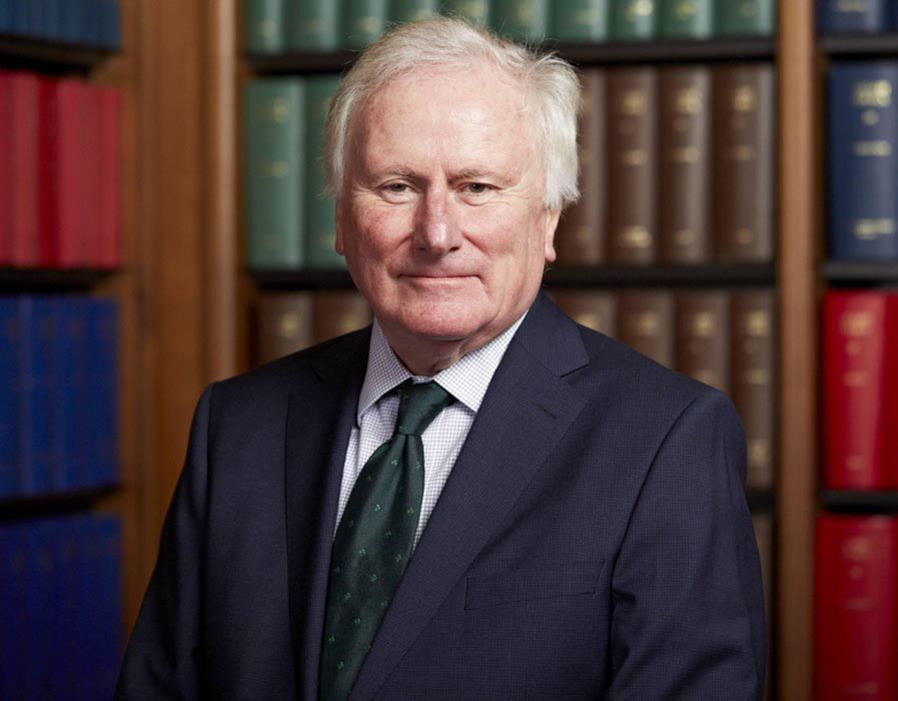
Sir Brian Kerr, the last law lord appointed under the Appellate Jurisdiction Act 1876.

In 1873 William Ewart Gladstone's government passed the Judicature Act 1873, which reorganised the court system and abolished the appellate jurisdiction of the House of Lords in respect of English appeals. In February 1874, before the Act came into force, Gladstone's Liberal Government fell. The Conservative Benjamin Disraeli became prime minister. In 1874 and 1875 Acts were passed delaying the coming into force of the Judicature Act 1873. The Appellate Jurisdiction Act 1876 repealed the provisions rescinding the jurisdiction of the House of Lords. Additionally, the Act provided for the appointment of two persons to be Lords of Appeal in Ordinary, who were to sit in the House of Lords under the dignity of baron. Originally, though they held the rank of baron for life, they served in Parliament only while holding judicial office. In 1889, however, an Act was passed allowing Lords of Appeal to continue to sit and vote in Parliament even after retirement from office.

The last person to be made a law lord under the Appellate Jurisdiction Act 1876 was Sir Brian Kerr on 29 June 2009. On 1 October 2009, the Appellate Jurisdiction Act 1876 was repealed by Schedule 18 to the Constitutional Reform Act 2005 owing to the creation of the Supreme Court of the United Kingdom. As a result, the power to create life peers under the Appellate Jurisdiction Act 1876 lapsed, although the validity of peerages created thereunder remains intact.

== Qualifications and functions ==
=== Qualifications of candidates for appointment ===
To be appointed a Lord of Appeal in Ordinary under the 1876 Act, a person was required to have been a practising barrister for a period of fifteen years or to have held a high judicial office—as Lord Chancellor (before 2005) or judge of the Court of Appeal, High Court or Court of Session—for a period of two years. Lords of Appeal in Ordinary were required to retire from judicial office at 70 or 75 years of age, though as barons they continued to serve as members of the House of Lords in its legislative capacity for life.

=== Letters patent appointing Lords of Appeal in Ordinary ===
While letters patent issued by the Monarch under the terms of the Life Peerages Act 1958 just name the recipient of the life peerage, letters patent issued under the terms of the Appellate Jurisdiction Act 1876 also name the retired Lord of Appeal in Ordinary in whose stead the recipient is appointed. In the final form used in 2009, these read:

Elizabeth the Second by the Grace of God of the United Kingdom of Great Britain and Northern Ireland and Our other Realms and Territories Queen Head of the Commonwealth Defender of the Faith / To whom these Presents shall come Greeting / Whereas Our [name of retired Lord of Appeal in Ordinary] has resigned his Office of a Lord of Appeal in Ordinary and the same is now vacant Now Know Ye that We of Our especial grace have in pursuance of the Appellate Jurisdiction Act 1876 as amended by subsequent enactments nominated and appointed and by these Presents Do nominate and appoint Our [name of the new appointee] to be a Lord of Appeal in Ordinary by the style of [full peerage title of the new appointee] to hold the said Office so long as he shall well behave himself therein subject to the provisions in the said Act mentioned with all wages profits privileges rank and precedence whatsoever to the said Office belonging or in anywise appertaining and to hold the said style of Baron unto him the said [name of the new appointee] during his life / In Witness whereof We have caused these Our Letters to be made Patent / Witness Ourself at Westminster the [day] day of [month] in the [year] Year of Our Reign.

=== Retirement age of Lords of Appeal in Ordinary ===
The statutory retirement age for Lords of Appeal in Ordinary depended on when they were first appointed to judicial office: for those who first became a judge before 31 March 1995, the retirement age was 75 years of age; for those appointed on or after that date, retirement was at 70 years of age (though they were permitted to continue sitting in a part-time capacity as a "Lord of Appeal" until the age of 75 years). There have been recent suggestions that the retirement age for the United Kingdom's most senior judges should revert to 75 years of age.

=== Number of Lords of Appeal in Ordinary ===
The Appellate Jurisdiction Act 1876 originally provided for the appointment of two Lords of Appeal in Ordinary, who would continue to serve while holding judicial office, though in 1887, they were permitted to continue to sit in the House of Lords for life, with the style and dignity of baron. The number of Lords of Appeal in Ordinary was increased incrementally over the years—to three in 1882, to four in 1891, to six in 1913, to seven in 1929, to nine in 1947, to eleven in 1968 and to twelve in 1994. The Administration of Justice Act 1968 allowed the Sovereign to make a statutory instrument, if each House of Parliament passed a resolution approving a draft of the same, increasing the maximum number of Lords of Appeal in Ordinary.

=== Remuneration ===
Of all members of the House of Lords, only Lords of Appeal in Ordinary ever received state salaries by virtue of their position (other Lords have only ever received a daily allowance for attending sittings, plus expenses of attendance). In 2004, the salary for the Senior Lord of Appeal in Ordinary was £185,705, and for other Lords of Appeal in Ordinary it was £179,431.

== Lords of Appeal ==
In exercising the judicial functions of the House of Lords, Lords of Appeal in Ordinary were sometimes joined by other Lords of Appeal. Lords of Appeal included holders or former holders of high judicial office who were members of the House of Lords, but not by virtue of the Appellate Jurisdiction Act (e.g. life peers under the Life Peerages Act 1958). The Lords of Appeal continue to hold the style for life.

=== Senior and Second Senior Law Lord ===
The two most senior Lords of Appeal in Ordinary were designated the Senior and Second Senior Lords of Appeal in Ordinary respectively. The Senior Lord of Appeal in Ordinary historically was the Law Lord who was senior by virtue of having served in the House for the longest period. With the appointment of Lord Bingham of Cornhill in 2000, however, it became an appointed position.

The Second Senior Lord of Appeal in Ordinary became the peer who had served for the longest period. Lord Hope of Craighead succeeded to this position on Lord Hoffmann's retirement on 20 April 2009.

== See also ==
- Judicial functions of the House of Lords
- Judicial Committee of the Privy Council
- List of law life peerages
- Nobles of the Robe

== Sources ==
- Chisholm, Hugh, ed. (1911). "Lords of Appeal in Ordinary" . Encyclopædia Britannica. Vol. 17 (11th ed.). Cambridge University Press. p. 6.
- May, Sir Thomas Erskine (1896). Constitutional History of England since the Accession of George the Third (11th ed.). London: Longmans, Green and Co. Archived from the original on 3 March 2004.
