= List of statutory instruments of the United Kingdom, 1965 =

This is an incomplete list of statutory instruments of the United Kingdom in 1965.

== Statutory instruments ==
=== 1-499 ===
- Guildie Howes Mine (Locomotives and Diesel Vehicles) Special Regulations 1965 (SI 1965/33)
- Muirshiel Barytes Mine (Storage Battery Locomotives) Special Regulations 1965 (SI 1965/120)
- Transfer of Functions (Shipping and Construction of Ships) Order 1965 (SI 1965/145)
- Road Vehicles (Index Marks) (Amendment) Regulations 1965 (SI 1965/237)
- Mid and South East Cheshire Water Board Order 1965 (SI 1965/248)
- Trunk Roads (40 m.p.h. Speed Limit) (No. 6) Order 1965 (SI 1965/305)
- Secretary of State for Wales and Minister of Land and Natural Resources Order 1965 (SI 1965/319)
- Act of Sederunt (Rules of Court) (Consolidation and Amendment) 1965 (SI 1965/321)
- Barnsley (Water Charges) Order 1965 (SI 1965/419)

=== 500-999 ===
- Local Law (London Borough of Newham) Order 1965 (SI 1965/509)
- Local Law (North East London Boroughs) Order 1965 (SI 1965/510)
- Clerks of the Peace and Justices' Clerks (Compensation) Regulations 1965 (SI 1965/517)
- National Health Service (Regional Hospital Areas) Order 1965 (SI 1965/527)
- London Authorities (Miscellaneous Health Provisions) Order 1965 (SI 1965/528)
- Air Corporations (General Staff, Pilots and Officers Pensions) (Amendment) Regulations 1965 (SI 1965/529)
- Local Law (South East London Boroughs) Order 1965 (SI 1965/531)
- Local Law (South West London Boroughs) Order 1965 (SI 1965/532)
- Local Law (North West London Boroughs) Order 1965 (SI 1965/533)
- Water Resources (Licences) Regulations 1965 (SI 1965/534)
- National Insurance (Industrial Injuries) (Colliery Workers Supplementary Scheme) Amendment Order 1965 (SI 1965/535)
- Special Constables Regulations 1965 (SI 1965/536)
- Superannuation (Inner London Magistrates' Courts) Regulations 1965 (SI 1965/537)
- Police Regulations 1965 (SI 1965/538)
- Local Law (Greater London Council and Inner London Boroughs) Order 1965 (SI 1965/540)
- Post Office Register (Trustee Savings Banks) (Amendment) Regulations 1965 (SI 1965/556)
- River Authorities (Precepts) Regulations 1965 (SI 1965/542)
- Police (Discipline) Regulations 1965 (SI 1965/543)
- Police (Discipline) (Deputy Chief Constables, Assistant Chief Constables and Chief Constables) Regulations 1965 (SI 1965/544)
- Wages Regulation (Keg and Drum) (Holidays) Order 1965 (SI 1965/551)
- Central Institutions (Recognition) (Scotland) Amendment Regulations 1965 (SI 1956/552) (S. 24)
- Techers Superannuation Amending Rules 1965 (SI 1965/553)
- London Authorities (Children) Order 1965 (SI 1965/554)
- Town and Country Planning (Control of Advertisements) (Amendment) Regulations 1965 (SI 1965/555)
- London Government Order 1965 (SI 1965/654)
- Merseyside Special Review Area Order 1965 (SI 1965/905)
- South East Lancashire Special Review Area Order (SI 1965/906)

=== 1000-1499 ===
- Industrial Tribunals (England and Wales) Regulations 1965 (SI 1965/1101)
- Diplomatic Privileges (Citizens of the United Kingdom and Colonies) (Amendment) Order 1965 (SI 1965/1124)
- Industrial Tribunals (Scotland) Regulations 1965 (SI 1965/1157)
- East of Christchurch-Tredegar Park Motorway Connecting Roads Special Roads Scheme 1965 (SI 1965/1247)
- Radnorshire and North Breconshire Water Board Order 1965 (SI 1965/1290)
- Dragonby Ironstone Mine (Diesel, Diesel-Electric and Storage Battery Vehicles) (Amendment) Special Regulations 1965 (SI 1965/1299)
- Trunk Roads (50 m.p.h. Speed Limit) (England) Order 1965 (SI 1965/1346)
- North East Lincolnshire Water Order 1965 (SI 1965/1377)
- Common Investment Fund Scheme 1965 (SI 1965/1467)

=== 1500-1999 ===
- County Court Funds Rules 1965 (SI 1965/1500)
- Visiting Forces and International Headquarters (Application of Law) Order 1965 (SI 1965/1536)
- Coal and Other Mines (Mechanics and Electricians) Regulations 1965 (SI 1965/1559)
- Taf Fechan Water Board Order 1964 (SI 1965/1588)
- Redburn Mine (Storage Battery Locomotives) Special Regulations 1965 (SI 1965/1698)
- Barnsley Water Order 1965 (SI 1965/1728)
- Rules of the Supreme Court (Revision) 1965 (SI 1965/1776)
- Act of Adjournal (Criminal Legal Aid Fees Amendment) 1965 (SI 1965/1788)
- British Indian Ocean Territory Order 1965 (SI 1965/1920)
- Redundancy Payments Pensions Regulations 1965 (SI 1965/1932)
- Industrial and Provident Societies Regulations 1965 (SI 1965/1995)

=== 2000-2999 ===
- Mid Calder Water Board Order 1965 (SI 1965/2006)
- County of Ross and Cromarty (River Lael Allt Gleann a' Mhadaidh) Water Order 1965 (SI 1965/2102)
- Town and Country Planning (Scotland) (New Town of East Kilbride) (Special Development) Order 1965 (SI 1965/2118)
- Local Government (West Midlands) Order 1965 (SI 1965/2139)
- North and Mid Cornwall Water Board Order 1965 (SI 1965/2197)

== Sources ==
- Statutory Instruments 1965. Her Majesty's Stationery Office. 1965.

== See also ==
- List of statutory instruments of the United Kingdom
