= Supreme Court of Judicature Act 1877 =

Act of the Parliament of the United Kingdom

Supreme Court of Judicature Act 1877 (Note: Section 1.)
- Act of Parliament
- Parliament of the United Kingdom
- Long title: An Act for amending the Supreme Court of Judicature Acts, 1873 and 1875.
- Citation: 40 & 41 Vict. c. 9
- Territorial extent: England and Wales (Note: Section 2.)

Dates
- Royal assent: 24 April 1877
- Commencement: 24 April 1877 (Note: The Acts of Parliament (Commencement) Act 1793.)
- Repealed: 1 January 1926
Other legislation
Amends	Supreme Court of Judicature Act 1873; Supreme Court of Judicature Act 1875
Amended by	Statute Law Revision Act 1883
Repealed by	Supreme Court of Judicature (Consolidation) Act 1925

Status: Repealed

Text of statute as originally enacted

The Supreme Court of Judicature Act 1877 (40 & 41 Vict. c. 9) was an act of the Parliament of the United Kingdom enacted to provide the structure of the ordinary judges of the Court of Appeal, the appellate division of the High Court of Justice and the Lord Justices of Appeal in England and Ireland.

In England, the act established the number of judges at five (5) and their salaries.

== Subsequent developments ==
The whole act was repealed by section 226(1) of, and the sixth schedule to the Supreme Court of Judicature (Consolidation) Act 1925 (15 & 16 Geo. 5. c. 49), which came into force on 1 January 1926.

== See also ==
- Judicature Act

== Bibliography ==
- Robert William Andrews and Arbuthnot Butler Stoney. "Judicature Act, 1877". The Supreme Court of Judicature Acts, and the Appellate Jurisdiction Act, 1876. Reeves & Turner. Chancery Lane, London. 1880. Page 89. Second Edition. 1883. Page 103.
- Charles Burney, Montague Johnstone Muir Mackenzie and Charles Arnold White. "Supreme Court of Judicature Act, 1877". Wilson's Practice of the Supreme Court of Judicature. Seventh Edition. Stevens and Sons. Chancery Lane, London. 1888. Pages 93 and 94.
- Thomas Snow, Charles Burney and Francis A Stringer. "The Supreme Court of Judicature Act, 1877". The Annual Practice 1905. Sweet and Maxwell. Stevens and Sons. London. 1905. Volume 2. Pages 511 and 512.
- Thomas Snow, Charles Burney and Francis A Stringer. "The Supreme Court of Judicature Act, 1877". The Annual Practice 1909. Sweet and Maxwell. Stevens and Sons. London. 1909. Volume 2. Pages 571 and 572. See also pages 451 to 453, 461, 567, 569, 570, 574, 575, 580, 581, 603. See also volume 1, pages 5, 868 and 1067.
