= Building Societies Act =

Stock short title used for legislation

Building Societies Act is a stock short title used in both Ireland and the United Kingdom for legislation relating to building societies.

== List ==
=== Ireland ===
- The Building Societies (Amendment) Act 2006
- The Building Societies Act 1989
- The Building Societies (Amendment) Act 1986
- The Building Societies (Amendment) Act 1983
- The Building Societies (Amendment) Act 1980
- The Building Societies Act 1976
- The Building Societies Act 1974
- The Building Societies Act 1942

=== United Kingdom ===
- The Dormant Bank and Building Society Accounts Act 2008 (c. 31)
- The Building Societies (Funding) and Mutual Societies (Transfers) Act 2007 (c. 26)
- The Building Societies (Distributions) Act 1997 (c. 41)
- The Building Societies Act 1997 (c. 32)
- The Building Societies (Joint Account Holders) Act 1995 (c. 5)
- The Building Societies Act 1986 (c. 53)
- The Building Societies Act 1962 (10 & 11 Eliz. 2. c. 37)
- The Building Societies Act 1960 (8 & 9 Eliz. 2. c. 64)
- The Building Societies Act (Northern Ireland) 1967 (c. 31) (NI)

The Building Societies Acts 1874 to 1894 was the collective title of the following Acts:

- The Building Societies Act 1874 (37 & 38 Vict. c. 42)
- The Building Societies Act 1875 (38 & 39 Vict. c. 9)
- The Building Societies Act 1877 (40 & 41 Vict. c. 63)
- The Building Societies Act 1884 (47 & 48 Vict. c. 41)
- The Building Societies Act 1894 (57 & 58 Vict. c. 47)

== See also ==
- List of short titles
