= Building Societies (Funding) and Mutual Societies (Transfers) Act 2007 =

Act of the Parliament of the United Kingdom

Building Societies (Funding) and Mutual Societies (Transfers) Act 2007 (Note: Section 6(1).)
- Act of Parliament
- Parliament of the United Kingdom
- Long title: An Act to make provision in relation to funding limits in respect of building societies; to provide consequential rights to building society members; and to make provision in connection with the transfer of the business of certain mutual societies.
- Citation: 2007 c. 26
- Introduced by: Sir John Butterfill MP, 13 December 2006 (Commons)
- Territorial extent: United Kingdom (Note: Section 6(3).)

Dates
- Royal assent: 23 October 2007
- Commencement: Various (Note: Section 6(2).)
Other legislation
Amends	Building Societies Act 1986
Amended by	Companies Act 2006 (Consequential Amendments, Transitional Provisions and Savings) Order 2009; Co-operative and Community Benefit Societies Act 2014; Building Societies Legislation (Amendment) (EU Exit) Regulations 2018

Status: Amended

History of passage through Parliament

Text of statute as originally enacted

Revised text of statute as amended

The Building Societies (Funding) and Mutual Societies (Transfers) Act 2007 (c. 26), sometimes referred to as the Butterfill Act, is an act of the Parliament of the United Kingdom. The act gives building societies greater powers to merge with other companies.

== Passage through Parliament ==
The bill was introduced as a private member's bill by Conservative Member of Parliament Sir John Butterfill, originally titled the Financial Mutuals Arrangements Bill. It was also known as the Butterfill Bill.

== Provisions ==
The act allowed building societies to merge with other financial mutuals. The act changed the minimum threshold for retail markets from 50% to 25%.

== Reception ==
The legislation received cross-party support during its passage in Parliament.

== Mergers under the act ==
There have been several high-profile mergers under the auspices of the act.

In August 2009, Britannia Building Society merged with Co-operative Financial Services (part of The Co-operative Group). Britannia initially continued as a brand, although owned by the Co-op.

In February 2011, Kent Reliance Building Society pooled its assets with American private equity bank J.C. Flowers & Co.. J.C. Flowers & Co. has a 40% interest in the new bank, named OneSavings Bank plc, with the other 60% in the hands of Kent Reliance Provident Society, a mutual organisation owned by former Kent Reliance BS members. The bank trades as Kent Reliance.

== See also ==
- Building Societies Act
