= KRPS =

KRPS may refer to:

- KRPS (FM), a radio station at 89.9 FM broadcasting a public radio format in Pittsburg, Kansas, USA
- Kent Reliance Provident Society, an Industrial and Provident Society in the United Kingdom
