= List of acts of the Parliament of the United Kingdom from 1877 =

This is a complete list of acts of the Parliament of the United Kingdom for the year 1877.

Note that the first parliament of the United Kingdom was held in 1801; parliaments between 1707 and 1800 were either parliaments of Great Britain or of Ireland). For acts passed up until 1707, see the list of acts of the Parliament of England and the list of acts of the Parliament of Scotland. For acts passed from 1707 to 1800, see the list of acts of the Parliament of Great Britain. See also the list of acts of the Parliament of Ireland.

For acts of the devolved parliaments and assemblies in the United Kingdom, see the list of acts of the Scottish Parliament, the list of acts of the Northern Ireland Assembly, and the list of acts and measures of Senedd Cymru; see also the list of acts of the Parliament of Northern Ireland.

The number shown after each act's title is its chapter number. Acts passed before 1963 are cited using this number, preceded by the year(s) of the reign during which the relevant parliamentary session was held; thus the Union with Ireland Act 1800 is cited as "39 & 40 Geo. 3 c. 67", meaning the 67th act passed during the session that started in the 39th year of the reign of George III and which finished in the 40th year of that reign. Note that the modern convention is to use Arabic numerals in citations (thus "41 Geo. 3" rather than "41 Geo. III"). Acts of the last session of the Parliament of Great Britain and the first session of the Parliament of the United Kingdom are both cited as "41 Geo. 3".

Some of these acts have a short title. Some of these acts have never had a short title. Some of these acts have a short title given to them by later acts, such as by the Short Titles Act 1896.

== 40 & 41 Vict. ==
The fourth session of the 21st Parliament of the United Kingdom, which met from 8 February 1877 until 14 August 1877.

=== Public general acts ===
Short title	Citation	Royal assent
Long title
Consolidated Fund Act (350,000l.) or the Supply Act 1877 (repealed)	40 & 41 Vict. c. 1	12 March 1877
An Act to apply the sum of Three hundred and fifty thousand pounds out of the Consolidated Fund to the service of the year ending the thirty-first day of March one thousand eight hundred and seventy-seven. (Repealed by Statute Law Revision Act 1883 (46 & 47 Vict. c. 39))
Treasury Bills Act 1877	40 & 41 Vict. c. 2	16 March 1877
An Act to provide for the preparation, issue, and payment of Treasury Bills, and make further provision respecting Exchequer Bills.
Publicans' Certificates (Scotland) Act (1876) Amendment Act 1877 (repealed)	40 & 41 Vict. c. 3	23 March 1877
An Act to amend the Publicans' Certificates (Scotland) Act, 1876. (Note: Publicans' Certificates (Scotland) Act 1876 (39 & 40 Vict. c. 26)) (Repealed by Licensing (Scotland) Act 1903 (3 Edw. 7. c. 25))
Beer Licences Regulation (Ireland) Act 1877 (repealed)	40 & 41 Vict. c. 4	23 March 1877
An Act to amend the Law relating to the granting of Licences for the sale of Beer, Ale, and Porter in Ireland. (Repealed by Licensing Act (Northern Ireland) 1971 (c. 13 (N.I.)))
Exchequer Bills and Bonds Act 1877 (repealed)	40 & 41 Vict. c. 5	23 March 1877
An Act to raise the sum of Seven hundred thousand pounds by Exchequer Bills or Exchequer Bonds for the service of the year ending on the thirty-first day of March one thousand eight hundred and seventy-seven. (Repealed by Statute Law Revision Act 1883 (46 & 47 Vict. c. 39))
Supply Act 1877 (repealed)	40 & 41 Vict. c. 6	27 March 1877
An Act to apply certain sums out of the Consolidated Fund to the service of the years ending on the thirty-first day of March one thousand eight hundred and seventy-six, one thousand eight hundred and seventy-seven, and one thousand eight hundred and seventy-eight. (Repealed by Statute Law Revision Act 1883 (46 & 47 Vict. c. 39))
Mutiny Act 1877 (repealed)	40 & 41 Vict. c. 7	24 April 1877
An Act for punishing Mutiny and Desertion, and for the better payment of the Army and their Quarters. (Repealed by Statute Law Revision Act 1883 (46 & 47 Vict. c. 39))
Marine Mutiny Act 1877 (repealed)	40 & 41 Vict. c. 8	24 April 1877
An Act for the Regulation of Her Majesty's Royal Marine Forces while on shore. (Repealed by Statute Law Revision Act 1883 (46 & 47 Vict. c. 39))
Supreme Court of Judicature Act 1877 (repealed)	40 & 41 Vict. c. 9	24 April 1877
An Act for amending the Supreme Court of Judicature Acts, 1873 and 1875. (Repealed by Supreme Court of Judicature (Consolidation) Act 1925 (15 & 16 Geo. 5. c. 49))
Customs and Inland Revenue Amendment Act 1877 (repealed)	40 & 41 Vict. c. 10	17 May 1877
An Act to authorise the continuance of the Charge heretofore payable on certain Offices, Annuities, Pensions, and Allowances. (Repealed by Statute Law Revision Act 1958 (6 & 7 Eliz. 2. c. 46))
Jurisdiction in Rating Act 1877	40 & 41 Vict. c. 11	17 May 1877
An Act to make provision with respect to Judicial proceedings in certain cases relating to Rating.
Consolidated Fund (5,900,000l.) Act or the Supply Act 1877 (repealed)	40 & 41 Vict. c. 12	11 June 1877
An Act to apply the sum of five million nine hundred thousand pounds out of the Consolidated Fund to the service of the year ending the thirty-first day of March one thousand eight hundred and seventy-eight. (Repealed by Statute Law Revision Act 1883 (46 & 47 Vict. c. 39))
Customs, Inland Revenue, and Savings Banks Act 1877	40 & 41 Vict. c. 13	11 June 1877
An Act to grant certain Duties of Customs and Inland Revenue, and to amend the Laws relating to Customs, Inland Revenue, and Savings Banks. (Repealed for England and Wales and Northern Ireland by Statute Law (Repeals) Act 2008 (c. 12))
Evidence Act 1877 (repealed)	40 & 41 Vict. c. 14	28 June 1877
An Act for the Amendment of the Law of Evidence in certain cases of Misdemeanor. (Repealed by Statute Law (Repeals) Act 1981 (c. 19))
Public Libraries (Ireland) Amendment Act 1877 (repealed)	40 & 41 Vict. c. 15	28 June 1877
An Act to amend the Public Libraries Act (Ireland), 1855. (Repealed for Northern Ireland by Museums (Northern Ireland) Order 1981 (SI 1981/438) and for the Republic of Ireland by Local Government Act 1994 (No. 8))
Removal of Wrecks Act 1877 (repealed)	40 & 41 Vict. c. 16	28 June 1877
An Act to facilitate the removal of Wrecks obstructing Navigation. (Repealed by Merchant Shipping Act 1894 (57 & 58 Vict. c. 60))
Borough Quarter Sessions Act 1877 (repealed)	40 & 41 Vict. c. 17	28 June 1877
An Act to amend the Law relating to the Division of Courts of Quarter Sessions in Boroughs. (Repealed by Statute Law Revision Act 1898 (61 & 62 Vict. c. 22))
Settled Estates Act 1877	40 & 41 Vict. c. 18	28 June 1877
An Act to consolidate and amend the Law relating to Leases and Sales of Settled Estates. (Repealed for England and Wales by Law of Property (Amendment) Act 1924 (15 & 16 Geo. 5. c. 5) and Settled Land Act 1925 (15 & 16 Geo. 5. c. 18))
Public Works Loans Act 1877 (repealed)	40 & 41 Vict. c. 19	12 July 1877
An Act to grant Money for the purpose of Loans by the Public Works Loan Commissioners, and authorise those Commissioners to compound a loan and interest, and amend the Public Works Loans Act, 1875. (Note: Public Works Loans Act 1875 (38 & 39 Vict. c. 89)) (Repealed by Statute Law Revision Act 1883 (46 & 47 Vict. c. 39))
Constabulary (Ireland) Amendment Act 1877 or the Constabulary (Ireland) Act 1877 (repealed)	40 & 41 Vict. c. 20	12 July 1877
An Act to fix the Salaries of the Members of the Royal Irish Constabulary, and to amend the eleventh section of the Constabulary (Ireland) Amendment Act, 1870. (Note: Constabulary (Ireland) Amendment Act 1870 (33 & 34 Vict. c. 83)) (Repealed for Northern Ireland by Statute Law Revision Act (Northern Ireland) 1954 (c. 35 (N.I.)) and for the Republic of Ireland by Garda Síochána Act 1924 (No. 25))
Prison Act 1877 (repealed)	40 & 41 Vict. c. 21	12 July 1877
An Act to amend the Law relating to Prisons in England. (Repealed by Prison Act 1952 (15 & 16 Geo. 6 & 1 Eliz. 2. c. 52))
General Police and Improvement (Scotland) Act 1862 Amendment Act 1877 (repealed)	40 & 41 Vict. c. 22	12 July 1877
An Act to amend the General Police and Improvement (Scotland) Act, 1862. (Note: General Police and Improvement (Scotland) Act 1862 (25 & 26 Vict. c. 101)) (Repealed by Burgh Police (Scotland) Act 1892 (55 & 56 Vict. c. 55))
Colonial Fortifications Act 1877 (repealed)	40 & 41 Vict. c. 23	23 July 1877
An Act to make better provision respecting fortifications, works, buildings, and land situate in a Colony, and held for the defence of the Colony. (Repealed by Statute Law (Repeals) Act 1976 (c. 16))
Consolidated Fund (20,000,000l.) Act (repealed)	40 & 41 Vict. c. 24	23 July 1877
An Act to apply the sum of twenty million pounds out of the Consolidated Fund to the service of the year ending the thirty-first day of March one thousand eight hundred and seventy-eight. (Repealed by Statute Law Revision Act 1883 (46 & 47 Vict. c. 39))
Solicitors Act 1877 (repealed)	40 & 41 Vict. c. 25	23 July 1877
An Act for regulating the Examination of persons applying to be admitted Solicitors of the Supreme Court of Judicature in England, and for otherwise amending the Law relating to Solicitors. (Repealed by Solicitors Act 1932 (22 & 23 Geo. 5. c. 37))
Companies Act 1877 (repealed)	40 & 41 Vict. c. 26	23 July 1877
An Act to amend the Companies Acts of 1862 and 1867. (Repealed by Companies (Consolidation) Act 1908 (8 Edw. 7. c. 69))
Public Works Loans (Ireland) Act 1877 (repealed)	40 & 41 Vict. c. 27	23 July 1877
An Act to grant Money for the purposes of Loans by the Commissioners of Public Works in Ireland, and to remit certain Loans, and to amend the Law relating to Loans for public purposes by the Commissioners of Public Works in Ireland. (Repealed by Public Works &c Loans Act (Northern Ireland) 1953 (c. 13 (N.I.)))
Game Laws Amendment (Scotland) Act 1877 (repealed)	40 & 41 Vict. c. 28	2 August 1877
An Act to amend the Laws relating to Game in Scotland. (Repealed by Agricultural Holdings Act 1906 (6 Edw. 7. c. 56) and Wildlife and Natural Environment (Scotland) Act 2011 (asp 6))
Married Women's Property (Scotland) Act 1877 (repealed)	40 & 41 Vict. c. 29	2 August 1877
An Act for the protection of the Property of Married Women in Scotland. (Repealed by Law Reform (Husband and Wife) (Scotland) Act 1984 (c. 15))
Telegraphs (Money) Act 1877 (repealed)	40 & 41 Vict. c. 30	2 August 1877
An Act for enabling a further Sum to be raised for the purposes of the Telegraph Acts, 1868 to 1870. (Repealed by Statute Law Revision Act 1894 (57 & 58 Vict. c. 56))
Limited Owners Reservoirs and Water Supply Further Facilities Act 1877 (repealed)	40 & 41 Vict. c. 31	2 August 1877
An Act to give further facilities to Landowners of limited interests in England and Wales and Ireland to charge their estates with the expenses of constructing Reservoirs for the storage of Water, and other similar purposes. (Repealed for England and Wales by Statute Law Revision Act 1963 (c. 30) and for Northern Ireland by Water and Sewerage Services (Northern Ireland) Order 1973 (SI 1973/70 (N.I. 2)))
Public Loans Remission Act 1877 (repealed)	40 & 41 Vict. c. 32	2 August 1877
An Act to remit certain Loans formerly made out of the Consolidated Fund or other Public Revenue of the United Kingdom. (Repealed by Statute Law Revision Act 1898 (61 & 62 Vict. c. 22))
Contingent Remainders Act 1877	40 & 41 Vict. c. 33	2 August 1877
An Act to amend the Law as to Contingent Remainders. (Repealed for England and Wales by Law of Property (Amendment) Act 1924 (15 & 16 Geo. 5. c. 5))
Real Estate Charges Act 1877 (repealed)	40 & 41 Vict. c. 34	2 August 1877
An Act to amend the Acts seventeenth and eighteenth Victoria, chapter one hundred and thirteen, and thirtieth and thirty-first Victoria, chapter sixty. (Repealed for England and Wales by Administration of Estates Act 1925 (15 & 16 Geo. 5. c. 23) and for Northern Ireland by Administration of Estates Act (Northern Ireland) 1955 (c. 24 (N.I.)))
Metropolitan Open Spaces Act 1877 (repealed)	40 & 41 Vict. c. 35	2 August 1877
An Act for affording Facilities for the enjoyment by the Public of Open Spaces in the Metropolis. (Repealed by Open Spaces Act 1906 (6 Edw. 7. c. 25))
Registration of Leases (Scotland) Amendment Act 1877	40 & 41 Vict. c. 36	6 August 1877
An Act to amend "The Registration of Leases (Scotland) Act, 1857." (Note: Registration of Leases (Scotland) Act 1857 (20 & 21 Vict. c. 26))
Trade Marks Registration Extension Act 1877 or the Trade Marks, Registration etc. Act 1877 (repealed)	40 & 41 Vict. c. 37	6 August 1877
An Act for extending the Time for the Registration of Trade Marks, in so far as relates to Trade Marks used in Textile Industries. (Repealed by Patents, Designs, and Trade Marks Act 1883 (46 & 47 Vict. c. 57))
Board of Education (Scotland) Act 1877 or the Board of Education (Scotland) Continuance Act or the Board of Education Continuance Act (repealed)	40 & 41 Vict. c. 38	6 August 1877
An Act to continue for One Year the Board of Education in Scotland. (Repealed by Statute Law Revision Act 1883 (46 & 47 Vict. c. 39))
Factors Act 1877 or the Factors Amendment Act 1877 or the Factors' Acts Amendment Act 1877 (repealed)	40 & 41 Vict. c. 39	10 August 1877
An Act to amend the Factors' Acts. (Repealed for England and Wales and Ireland by Factors Act 1889 (52 & 53 Vict. c. 45) and for Scotland by Factors (Scotland) Act 1890 (53 & 54 Vict. c. 40))
Writs Execution (Scotland) Act 1877	40 & 41 Vict. c. 40	10 August 1877
An Act to amend the Form of Warrant of Execution on certain Extracts of Writs registered in the Books of Council and Session and Sheriff Court Books in Scotland; and to provide for the Authentication of certain Extracts of Writs.
Crown Office Act 1877	40 & 41 Vict. c. 41	10 August 1877
An Act for making Provision with respect to the Preparation and Authentication of Commissions and other Documents issued from the Office of the Clerk of the Crown in Chancery; and for other purposes.
Fisheries (Oyster, Crab, and Lobster) Act 1877 (repealed)	40 & 41 Vict. c. 42	10 August 1877
An Act to amend the Law relating to the Fisheries of Oysters, Crabs, and Lobsters, and other Sea Fisheries. (Repealed for England and Wales and Scotland by Sea Fisheries (Shellfish) Act 1967 (c. 83) and for Northern Ireland by Fisheries Act (Northern Ireland) 1966 (c. 17 (N.I.)))
Justices Clerks Act 1877 (repealed)	40 & 41 Vict. c. 43	10 August 1877
An Act to amend the Law with respect to the Appointment, Payment, and Fees of Clerks of Justices of the Peace and Clerks of Special and Petty Sessions. (Repealed by Statute Law Revision Act 1894 (57 & 58 Vict. c. 56), Criminal Justice Administration Act 1914 (4 & 5 Geo. 5. c. 58), Justices of the Peace Act 1949 (12, 13 & 14 Geo. 6. c. 101), Statute Law (Repeals) Act 1978 (c. 45) and Justices of the Peace Act 1979 (c. 55))
Superannuation (Mercantile Marine Fund Officers) Act 1877 (repealed)	40 & 41 Vict. c. 44	10 August 1877
An Act to make provision respecting the Superannuation Allowance of Officers whose Salaries were formerly payable out of the Mercantile Marine Fund. (Repealed by Merchant Shipping (Expenses) Act 1882 (45 & 46 Vict. c. 55))
Treasury Chest Fund Act 1877 (repealed)	40 & 41 Vict. c. 45	10 August 1877
An Act to limit and regulate the Treasury Chest Fund. (Repealed by Finance Act 1958 (6 & 7 Eliz. 2. c. 56))
Winter Assizes Act 1877 (repealed)	40 & 41 Vict. c. 46	10 August 1877
An Act to extend the provisions of the Winter Assizes Act, 1876. (Note: Winter Assizes Act 1876 (39 & 40 Vict. c. 57)) (Repealed for England and Wales by Supreme Court of Judicature (Consolidation) Act 1925 (15 & 16 Geo. 5. c. 49) and Courts Act 1971 (c. 23) and for Northern Ireland by Administration of Justice (Northern Ireland) Order 1975 (SI 1975/816 (N.I. 7)))
South Africa Act 1877 (repealed)	40 & 41 Vict. c. 47	10 August 1877
An Act for the Union under one Government of such of the South African Colonies and States as may agree thereto, and for the Government of such Union; and for purposes connected therewith. (Repealed by Statute Law (Repeals) Act 1973 (c. 39))
Universities of Oxford and Cambridge Act 1877	40 & 41 Vict. c. 48	10 August 1877
An Act to make further Provision respecting the Universities of Oxford and Cambridge and the Colleges therein.
General Prisons (Ireland) Act 1877 (repealed)	40 & 41 Vict. c. 49	14 August 1877
An Act to amend the Law relating to Prisons in Ireland. (Repealed by Statute Law Revision (Northern Ireland) Act 1980 (c. 59))
Sheriff Courts (Scotland) Act 1877 (repealed)	40 & 41 Vict. c. 50	14 August 1877
An Act to amend the Law in regard to the appointment of Sheriffs Substitute and Procurators Fiscal in Scotland; to extend the jurisdiction of and amend the procedure in the Sheriff Courts of Scotland; and for certain other purposes connected therewith. (Repealed by Sheriff Courts (Scotland) Act 1907 (7 Edw. 7. c. 51))
East India Loan Act 1877 (repealed)	40 & 41 Vict. c. 51	14 August 1877
An Act to enable the Secretary of State in Council of India to raise Money in the United Kingdom for the Service of the Government of India. (Repealed by East India Loans Act 1937 (1 Edw. 8 & 1 Geo. 6. c. 14))
Metropolitan Board of Works (Money) Act 1877 (repealed)	40 & 41 Vict. c. 52	14 August 1877
An Act for further amending the Acts relating to the raising of Money by the Metropolitan Board of Works; and for other purposes relating thereto. (Repealed by London County Council (Finance Consolidation) Act 1912 (2 & 3 Geo. 5. c. cv))
Prisons (Scotland) Act 1877	40 & 41 Vict. c. 53	14 August 1877
An Act to amend the Law relating to Prisons in Scotland.
Public Libraries Amendment Act 1877 (repealed)	40 & 41 Vict. c. 54	14 August 1877
An Act to amend the Public Libraries Acts. (Repealed for Scotland by Public Libraries Consolidation (Scotland) Act 1887 (50 & 51 Vict. c. 42), for England and Wales by Public Libraries Acts Amendment Act 1890 (53 & 54 Vict. c. 68) and for Northern Ireland by Statute Law Revision Act (Northern Ireland) 1954 (c. 35 (N.I.)))
Public Record Office Act 1877 or the Public Records Office Act 1877 (repealed)	40 & 41 Vict. c. 55	14 August 1877
An Act to amend the Public Record Office Act, 1838. (Note: Public Record Office Act 1838 (1 & 2 Vict. c. 94)) (Repealed by Public Records Act 1958 (6 & 7 Eliz. 2. c. 51))
County Officers and Courts (Ireland) Act 1877 (repealed)	40 & 41 Vict. c. 56	14 August 1877
An Act to amend the Laws relating to County Officers and to Courts of Quarter Sessions and Civil Bill Courts in Ireland. (Repealed by Judicature (Northern Ireland) Act 1978 (c. 23))
Supreme Court of Judicature Act (Ireland) 1877 (repealed)	40 & 41 Vict. c. 57	14 August 1877
An Act for the constitution of a Supreme Court of Judicature, and for other purposes relating to the better Administration of Justice, in Ireland. (Repealed by Judicature (Northern Ireland) Act 1978 (c. 23))
Police (Expenses) Continuance Act 1877 (repealed)	40 & 41 Vict. c. 58	14 August 1877
An Act to continue for one year the Police (Expenses) Act, 1875. (Note: Police (Expenses) Act 1875 (38 & 39 Vict. c. 48)) (Repealed by Statute Law Revision Act 1883 (46 & 47 Vict. c. 39))
Colonial Stock Act 1877 (repealed)	40 & 41 Vict. c. 59	14 August 1877
An Act to amend the Law with respect to the Transfer of Stock forming part of the Public Debt of any Colony, and the Stamp Duty on such Transfer. (Repealed by Statute Law (Repeals) Act 1998 (c. 43))
Canal Boats Act 1877 (repealed)	40 & 41 Vict. c. 60	14 August 1877
An Act to provide for the Registration and Regulation of Canal Boats used as Dwellings. (Repealed by Statute Law (Repeals) Act 1989 (c. 43))
Appropriation Act 1877 (repealed)	40 & 41 Vict. c. 61	14 August 1877
An Act to apply a sum out of the Consolidated Fund to the service of the year ending the thirty-first day of March one thousand eight hundred and seventy-eight, and to appropriate the Supplies granted in this Session of Parliament. (Repealed by Statute Law Revision Act 1883 (46 & 47 Vict. c. 39))
Legal Practitioners Act 1877 (repealed)	40 & 41 Vict. c. 62	14 August 1877
An Act to amend the Law relating to Legal Practitioners. (Repealed by Solicitors Act 1932 (22 & 23 Geo. 5. c. 37))
Building Societies Act 1877 (repealed)	40 & 41 Vict. c. 63	14 August 1877
An Act to amend the Building Societies Act, 1874. (Note: Building Societies Act 1874 (37 & 38 Vict. c. 42)) (Repealed for England and Wales and Scotland by Building Societies Act 1962 (10 & 11 Eliz. 2. c. 37) and for Northern Ireland by Building Societies Act (Northern Ireland) 1967 (c. 31 (N.I.)))
Annual Turnpike Acts Continuance Act 1877 (repealed)	40 & 41 Vict. c. 64	14 August 1877
An Act to continue certain Turnpike Acts in Great Britain, and to repeal certain other Turnpike Acts; and for other purposes connected therewith. (Repealed by Statute Law Revision Act 1898 (61 & 62 Vict. c. 22))
Fisheries (Dynamite) Act 1877 (repealed)	40 & 41 Vict. c. 65	14 August 1877
An Act to prohibit the use of Dynamite or other Explosives for the purpose of catching or destroying Fish in Public Fisheries. (Repealed for England and Wales by Salmon and Freshwater Fisheries Act 1923 (13 & 14 Geo. 5. c. 16), for Scotland by Salmon and Freshwater Fisheries (Protection) (Scotland) Act 1951 (14 & 15 Geo. 6. c. 26) and for Northern Ireland by Fisheries Act (Northern Ireland) 1966 (c. 17 (N.I.)))
Local Taxation Returns Act 1877 (repealed)	40 & 41 Vict. c. 66	14 August 1877
An Act to amend the Law with respect to the Annual Returns of Local Taxation in England, and for other purposes relating to such Taxation. (Repealed by Local Government Act 1933 (23 & 24 Geo. 5. c. 51))
Expiring Laws Continuance Act 1877 (repealed)	40 & 41 Vict. c. 67	14 August 1877
An Act to continue various expiring Laws. (Repealed by Statute Law Revision Act 1883 (46 & 47 Vict. c. 39))
Destructive Insects Act 1877 (repealed)	40 & 41 Vict. c. 68	14 August 1877
An Act for preventing the introduction and spreading of Insects destructive to Crops. (Repealed for England and Wales and Scotland by Plant Health Act 1967 (c. 8) and for Northern Ireland by Plant Health Act (Northern Ireland) 1967 (c. 28 (N.I.)))
Municipal Corporations (New Charters) Act 1877 (repealed)	40 & 41 Vict. c. 69	14 August 1877
An Act to amend the Law with respect to the Grant of Municipal Charters. (Repealed by Municipal Corporations Act 1882 (45 & 46 Vict. c. 50))

=== Local acts ===
Short title	Citation	Royal assent
Long title
Bromley Local Board (Great Page Heath Field) Act 1877	40 & 41 Vict. c. i	24 April 1877
An Act for giving effect to an Arrangement between the Local Board of Bromley in the county of Kent and the Owners of a Gravel Pit in the Great Page Heath Field at Bromley; and for other purposes.
Mersey Docks Act 1877 (repealed)	40 & 41 Vict. c. ii	24 April 1877
An Act for confirming, so far as the same may be necessary, certain Awards made with reference to the provisions of the Mersey Dock (Liverpool Dock Extension) Act, 1873, (Note: Mersey Dock (Liverpool Dock Extension) Act 1873 (36 & 37 Vict. c. cxliii)) and an Agreement made between the Mersey Docks and Harbour Board, the Birkenhead Improvement Commissioners, and the Great Western Railway Company; and for other purposes. (Repealed by the Mersey Docks and Harbour Board Act 1950 (14 Geo. 6. c. xxi), s 32 & fifth schedule.)
Vicar's Rate in Halifax Act 1877	40 & 41 Vict. c. iii	24 April 1877
An Act for amending the Law relating to the Vicar's Rate in Halifax in Yorkshire.
Highland Railway (Steam Vessels) Act 1877	40 & 41 Vict. c. iv	24 April 1877
An Act for empowering the Highland Railway Company to provide and use Steam and other Vessels; and for other purposes.
Falmouth Waterworks Act 1877	40 & 41 Vict. c. v	24 April 1877
An Act for granting further Powers to the Falmouth Waterworks Company.
General Steam Navigation Company Act 1877	40 & 41 Vict. c. vi	24 April 1877
An Act to enable the General Steam Navigation Company to raise further Capital.
City of London (Various Powers) Act 1877	40 & 41 Vict. c. vii	24 April 1877
An Act to amend the Metage on Grain (Port of London) Act, 1872, (Note: Metage on Grain (Port of London) Act 1872 (35 & 36 Vict. c. c)) and the Gaslight and Coke Company Act, 1876; (Note: Gaslight and Coke Company Act 1876 (39 & 40 Vict. c. ccxxv)) and for other purposes.
Metropolitan Board of Works Act 1877 (repealed)	40 & 41 Vict. c. viii	24 April 1877
An Act to enlarge the Powers of the Metropolitan Board of Works with respect to the making of certain Byelaws, to authorise them to contribute towards the Cost of a public Recreation Ground for the districts of Sydenham and Forest Hill, and to confer Powers upon the Board of Works for the Lewisham District with reference to such Recreation Ground. (Repealed by the Local Law (Greater London Council and Inner London Boroughs) Order 1965 (SI 1965/540), art 5 & Sch 3.)
Drainage and Improvement of Lands Supplemental Act (Ireland) 1877	40 & 41 Vict. c. ix	17 May 1877
An Act to confirm three Provisional Orders under "The Drainage and Improvement of Lands (Ireland) Act, 1863," and the Acts amending the same.
Louth and East Coast Railway Act 1877	40 & 41 Vict. c. x	17 May 1877
An Act to confer further powers upon the Louth and East Coast Railway Company; and for other purposes.
Leeds, Roundhay Park, and Osmondthorpe Junction Railway (Abandonment) Act 1877 (repealed)	40 & 41 Vict. c. xi	17 May 1877
An Act for the Abandonment of the Railways authorised by the Leeds, Roundhay Park, and Osmondthorpe Junction Railway Act, 1874; (Note: Leeds, Roundhay Park and Osmondthorpe Junction Railway Act 1874 (37 & 38 Vict. c. xv)) and for other purposes. (Repealed by Statute Law (Repeals) Act 2013 (c. 2))
Anderson's College Glasgow Act 1877	40 & 41 Vict. c. xii	17 May 1877
An Act for incorporating the Trustees of the Educational Institution in Glasgow founded under the Will of Professor John Anderson; for altering the Name of that Institution, and the Powers and Duties of the Trustees and Managers thereof; and for other purposes.
Girvan and Portpatrick Junction Railway Act 1877	40 & 41 Vict. c. xiii	17 May 1877
An Act to empower the Girvan and Portpatrick Junction Railway Company to acquire certain Lands in the Counties of Wigtown and Ayr; to borrow further Money; and for other purposes.
Glasgow Markets and Slaughter-houses Act 1877 (repealed)	40 & 41 Vict. c. xiv	17 May 1877
An Act to authorise the Commissioners for executing and carrying into effect "The Glasgow Market and Slaughterhouses Act, 1865," to enlarge the Markets and Slaughterhouses; to raise a further sum of Money; and for other purposes. (Repealed by the Glasgow Corporation Consolidation (Water, Transport and Markets) Order 1964, art 142 & Sch 8, a provisional order confirmed by the Glasgow Corporation Consolidation (Water, Transport and Markets) Order Confirmation Act 1964 (c. xliii), s 1. This repeal was subject to the provisions of the Glasgow Corporation Consolidation (Water, Transport and Markets) Order 1964.)
Van Diemen's Land Company's Act 1877	40 & 41 Vict. c. xv	17 May 1877
An Act to provide for the Application of Moneys arising from the Sale of Land of the Van Diemen's Land Company, and for other purposes, relating to that Company.
Weaver Navigation Act 1877	40 & 41 Vict. c. xvi	17 May 1877
An Act to authorise the Trustees of the River Weaver Navigation to raise a further Sum of Money for the Improvement of their Navigation, and to extend the Period for the Repayment of the Debt; and for other purposes relating to the said Navigation.
Kelvin Valley Railway Act 1877	40 & 41 Vict. c. xvii	17 May 1877
An Act to vest in the Kelvin Valley Railway Company the Undertaking of the Kilsyth Railway Company; and for other purposes.
Shotts Iron Company's Act 1877 (repealed)	40 & 41 Vict. c. xviii	17 May 1877
An Act for conferring further Powers on the Shotts Iron Company. (Repealed by the Statute Law (Repeals) Act 2004 (c. 14), s 1(1) & Sch 1, Pt 15.)
Harper's Patent Act 1877	40 & 41 Vict. c. xix	17 May 1877
An Act for rendering valid certain Letters Patent granted to William Harper for Improvements in Machinery or Apparatus for suspending Fabrics in Drying Stoves.
Law Life Assurance Society's Act 1877	40 & 41 Vict. c. xx	17 May 1877
An Act for making further provision with respect to the Investment of the Moneys of the Law Life Assurance Society.
North British Railway, No. 2 (Station Enlargement and Railways) Act 1877	40 & 41 Vict. c. xxi	17 May 1877
An Act to authorise the North British Railway Company to enlarge their Queen Street Station in Glasgow; to make certain railways in the counties of Lanark and Stirling; to divert the road leading to Kilbowie from the Glasgow and Dumbarton Turnpike Road; to acquire additional lands; to stop up certain streets in Glasgow and part of the said road; to subscribe to the Kelvin Valley Railway Company; and for other purposes.
Local Government Board's Provisional Orders Confirmation (Horbury, &c.) Act 1877	40 & 41 Vict. c. xxii	17 May 1877
An Act to confirm certain Provisional Orders of the Local Government Board relating to the Local Government Districts of Horbury, Hyde, Luton, and Skipton.
	Horbury Order 1877	
	Hyde Order 1877	
	Luton Order 1877	
	Skipton Order 1877	
North British, Arbroath, and Montrose Railway Act 1877	40 & 41 Vict. c. xxiii	17 May 1877
An Act to extend the Time for the Purchase of Lands for, and for the Construction of, the North British, Arbroath, and Montrose Railway.
Rotherham Corporation Act 1877 (repealed)	40 & 41 Vict. c. xxiv	17 May 1877
An Act to extend the Time for completing the Dalton Reservoir and Works in connexion therewith; to authorise the Corporation of Rotherham to purchase certain Premises in Rotherham; to amend the Acts relating to the said Corporation; and for other purposes. (Repealed by Statute Law (Repeals) Act 1989 (c. 43))
Hull Docks Act 1877	40 & 41 Vict. c. xxv	17 May 1877
An Act to enable the Dock Company at Kingston-upon-Hull to extend their Works, and to raise additional Capital; and for other purposes.
Edinburgh and District Waterworks Act 1877 (repealed)	40 & 41 Vict. c. xxvi	11 June 1877
An Act to enable the Edinburgh and District Water Trustees to abandon their authorised Alnwick Hill Service Reservoir, and to construct the same on another site, with relative works, and to divert certain conduits; and for other purposes. (Repealed by Edinburgh Corporation Order Confirmation Act 1958 (7 & 8 Eliz. 2. c. v))
Cork and Macroom Direct Railway Act 1877	40 & 41 Vict. c. xxvii	11 June 1877
An Act to authorise the Cork and Macroom (Direct) Railway Company to extend their Railway into the City of Cork; to raise further Capital; and for other purposes.
London, Brighton, and South Coast Railway Act 1877	40 & 41 Vict. c. xxviii	11 June 1877
An Act to confer further Powers on the London, Brighton, and South Coast Railway Company.
Longton Corporation Gas Act 1877 (repealed)	40 & 41 Vict. c. xxix	11 June 1877
An Act to authorise the transfer of the Undertaking of the Longton Gas Company to the Corporation of Longton. (Repealed by Stoke-on-Trent (Gas Consolidation) Act 1922 (12 & 13 Geo. 5. c. xxii))
Middlesbrough Improvement Act 1877 (repealed)	40 & 41 Vict. c. xxx	11 June 1877
An Act for extending the Powers of the Corporation of the Municipal Borough of Middlesbrough in the North Riding of the County of York with respect to Works for the storage of Gas, Markets and Ferries, and the Local Government and Improvement of the said Borough; and for other purposes. (Repealed by Middlesbrough Corporation Act 1933 (23 & 24 Geo. 5. c. lxxxiii))
Nottingham Borough Extension Act 1877	40 & 41 Vict. c. xxxi	11 June 1877
An Act for extending the Boundaries of the Borough and County of the Town of Nottingham, and for providing for the execution of the Nottingham and Leen District Sewerage Act, 1872, (Note: Nottingham and Leen District Sewerage Act 1872 (35 & 36 Vict. c. cv)) by the Corporation; and for other purposes.
Sittingbourne District Gas Act 1877	40 & 41 Vict. c. xxxii	11 June 1877
An Act for incorporating the Sittingbourne District Gas Company, and authorising them to supply with Gas the Town of Sittingbourne and certain neighbouring Parishes and Places in the County of Kent; and for other purposes.
Warrington Corporation Gas Act 1877	40 & 41 Vict. c. xxxiii	11 June 1877
An Act for enabling the Mayor, Aldermen, and Burgesses of the borough of Warrington in the counties of Lancaster and Chester to purchase the Undertaking of the Warrington Gaslight and Coke Company; to consolidate their Mortgage Debt; and for other purposes.
Stamford Water Act 1877 (repealed)	40 & 41 Vict. c. xxxiv	11 June 1877
An Act to provide for a constant supply of Water within the Town and Borough of Stamford; and for other purposes. (Repealed by South Lincolnshire Water Board Order 1962 (SI 1962/840))
Sligo Harbour Act 1877	40 & 41 Vict. c. xxxv	11 June 1877
An Act to amend and consolidate in one Act certain Provisions of Local Acts relating to the Port and Harbour of Sligo.
Somersetshire Drainage Act 1877	40 & 41 Vict. c. xxxvi	11 June 1877
An Act for the more effectual Drainage of Lands in the County of Somerset, and for other purposes.
Alliance and Dublin Gas (Bray Supply) Act 1877	40 & 41 Vict. c. xxxvii	11 June 1877
An Act to enable the Alliance and Dublin Consumers Gas Company to acquire additional Lands at Bray, and for other purposes connected therewith.
Maryport District and Harbour (Gas) Act 1877	40 & 41 Vict. c. xxxviii	11 June 1877
An Act to give effect to the Purchase by the Trustees of the District and Harbour of Maryport, in the county of Cumberland, of the Undertaking of the Maryport Town and Harbour Gas Company; to enable the said Trustees to borrow Money and to levy Rates; and for other purposes.
Newport (Monmouthshire) Gas Act 1877	40 & 41 Vict. c. xxxix	28 June 1877
An Act to authorise the Newport (Monmouthshire) Gas Company to construct further Works; and for other purposes.
Wear Navigation and Sunderland Dock Act 1877 (repealed)	40 & 41 Vict. c. xl	28 June 1877
An Act to extend and enlarge the Powers of the River Wear Commissioners; to amend the Acts relating to the said Commissioners; and for other purposes. (Repealed by Wear Navigation and Sunderland Dock (Consolidation and Amendment) Act 1922 (12 & 13 Geo. 5. c. lxxxiv))
Fareham Railway Abandonment Act 1877 (repealed)	40 & 41 Vict. c. xli	28 June 1877
An Act for the Abandonment of the Fareham Railway. (Repealed by Statute Law (Repeals) Act 2013 (c. 2))
Sheffield and Midland Railway Companies Committee Abandonment Act 1877 (repealed)	40 & 41 Vict. c. xlii	28 June 1877
An Act for the Abandonment of the Railways authorised to be made by the Sheffield and Midland Railway Companies Committee Act, 1873. (Repealed by Statute Law (Repeals) Act 2013 (c. 2))
Dundee Gas (Additional Powers) Act 1877 (repealed)	40 & 41 Vict. c. xliii	28 June 1877
An Act to authorise the Dundee Gas Commissioners to construct further Works and to borrow additional Money; and for other purposes. (Repealed by Dundee Corporation (Consolidated Powers) Order Confirmation Act 1957 (6 & 7 Eliz. 2. c. iv))
London and North-western Railway (New Lines) Act 1877	40 & 41 Vict. c. xliv	28 June 1877
An Act for empowering the London and North-western Railway Company to construct Railways in the counties of Warwick, Worcester, Stafford, Chester, and Lancaster; and for other purposes.
London and North-western Railway (New Works and Additional Lands) Act 1877	40 & 41 Vict. c. xlv	28 June 1877
An Act for empowering the London and North-western Railway Company to make new Roads and other Works, and to acquire additional Lands; and for other purposes.
Manchester, Sheffield, and Lincolnshire Railway Act 1877	40 & 41 Vict. c. xlvi	28 June 1877
An Act to enable the Manchester, Sheffield, and Lincolnshire Railway Company to execute certain works and acquire additional lands, and for conferring upon them further powers in relation to their undertaking.
London and North-western Railway (Whitehaven, Cleator, and Egremont Railway Vesting) Act 1877	40 & 41 Vict. c. xlvii	28 June 1877
An Act for vesting in the London and North-western Railway Company the undertaking of the Whitehaven, Cleator, and Egremont Railway Company; and for other purposes.
Cleator and Workington Junction Railway Act 1877	40 & 41 Vict. c. xlviii	28 June 1877
An Act to authorise the working of the Cleator and Work-, ington Junction Railway by the Furness Railway Company.
Clergy Mutual Assurance Society Act 1877 (repealed)	40 & 41 Vict. c. xlix	28 June 1877
An Act for enabling the Clergy Mutual Assurance Society to sue and be sued in the name of a Public Officer, and for more effectually vesting in their Trustees for the time being the Property and Securities of the Society; and for other purposes. (Repealed by Clergy Mutual Assurance Society Act 1914 (4 & 5 Geo. 5. c. clxx))
Coleford Railway Act 1877	40 & 41 Vict. c. l	28 June 1877
An Act for extending the time for the completion of the Coleford Railway; and for other purposes.
Wigtownshire Railway Act 1877	40 & 41 Vict. c. li	28 June 1877
An Act to authorise the construction by the Wigtownshire Railway Company of a Branch Railway to the Harbour of Garliestown, and the abandonment of their authorised Tramway to the said Harbour; and for other purposes.
Midland Railway (New Works, &c.) Act 1877	40 & 41 Vict. c. lii	28 June 1877
An Act for enabling the Midland Railway Company to construct a new Railway, an Aqueduct, and other Works, to acquire additional Lands and two Branch Railways, and to raise additional Capital; and for conferring additional powers upon them with relation to their own Undertaking, and upon them and the London and North-western Railway Company with relation to their Ashby and Nuneaton Joint Line; and for other purposes.
Athenry and Tuam Railway (Claremorris Abandonment) Act 1877 (repealed)	40 & 41 Vict. c. liii	28 June 1877
An Act to authorise the Abandonment of the Claremorris Extension of the Athenry and Tuam Railway Company; and for other purposes. (Repealed by Statute Law (Repeals) Act 2013 (c. 2))
Fal Valley Railway (Transfer and Abandonment) Act 1877	40 & 41 Vict. c. liv	28 June 1877
An Act for vesting in the Cornwall Minerals Railway Company the powers conferred by "The Fal Valley Railway Act, 1874," (Note: Fal Valley Railway Act 1874 (37 & 38 Vict. c. clxxix)) with respect to a portion of the Fal Valley Railway, and for the abandonment of the remainder of that Railway; and for other purposes.
Temple Mineral Railway (Abandonment) Act 1877 (repealed)	40 & 41 Vict. c. lv	28 June 1877
An Act for the abandonment of the Railway authorised by "The Temple Mineral Railway Act, 1874;" (Note: Temple Mineral Railway Act 1874 (37 & 38 Vict. c. clxxxix)) and for other purposes. (Repealed by Statute Law (Repeals) Act 2013 (c. 2))
Cheshire Lines Act 1877	40 & 41 Vict. c. lvi	28 June 1877
An Act for conferring further powers upon the Cheshire Lines Committee, and upon the three Companies represented upon that Committee; and for other purposes.
Lancashire Union Railways Act 1877	40 & 41 Vict. c. lvii	28 June 1877
An Act for empowering the Lancashire Union Railways Company to connect their Railway with the North Union Railway, and to raise additional Capital; and for other purposes.
North British Railway (Additional Works and Powers) Act 1877	40 & 41 Vict. c. lviii	28 June 1877
An Act to authorise the North British Railway Company to make certain Railways in connexion with their Stirling and Dunfermline Railway and North Leith Branch; to divert a Road at Galashiels; to acquire additional Lands for station purposes; to abandon part of the Capeldrae Deviation; to make provision with respect to the construction of the Tay Bridge Railway, in the town of Dundee, and a New Street in lieu of Physic Gardens Street, in Edinburgh, and the Harbour at Inverkeithing, and a further Loan to the Magistrates and Town Council of Burntisland; to authorise the Company to subscribe to the Arbroath and Newport Railway Companies; and to establish Savings Banks; and for other purposes.
Lancashire and Yorkshire Railway Act 1877	40 & 41 Vict. c. lix	28 June 1877
An Act for conferring further Powers on the Lancashire and Yorkshire Railway Company with relation to their undertaking; and for other purposes.
Portpatrick Railway Act 1877	40 & 41 Vict. c. lx	28 June 1877
An Act to authorise the Portpatrick Railway Company to acquire the East Pier at the Harbour of Stranraer; and for other purposes.
North British Railway (Amalgamations) Act 1877	40 & 41 Vict. c. lxi	28 June 1877
An Act to amalgamate the Saint Andrews Railway Company, the Leven and East of Fife Railway Company, the Edinburgh, Loanhead, and Roslin Railway Company, and the Dunfermline and Queensferry Railway Company with the North British Railway Company; and for other purposes.
Glasgow Juvenile Delinquency Repression Acts Amendment Act 1877 (repealed)	40 & 41 Vict. c. lxii	28 June 1877
An Act to amend the Glasgow Juvenile Delinquency Repression Acts Amendment Act, 1870. (Note: Glasgow Juvenile Delinquency Repression Acts Amendment Act 1870 (33 & 34 Vict. c. xlii)) (Repealed by Glasgow Juvenile Delinquency Prevention and Repression Act 1878 (41 & 42 Vict. c. cxxi))
London and Blackwall Railway Act 1877	40 & 41 Vict. c. lxiii	28 June 1877
An Act to authorise the London and Blackwall Railway Company to extend their Railway in the parish of Saint Anne Limehouse; and for other purposes.
Greenwich and Millwall Subway Act 1877	40 & 41 Vict. c. lxiv	28 June 1877
An Act to incorporate a Company for making a Subway under the River Thames between Millwall and Greenwich.
Bristol Port and Channel Dock Act 1877	40 & 41 Vict. c. lxv	28 June 1877
An Act for authorising the Bristol Port and Channel Dock Company to construct a Graving Dock and other Works, and to raise further Money; and for other purposes.
Ayr Bridge Act 1877 (repealed)	40 & 41 Vict. c. lxvi	28 June 1877
An Act for the rebuilding of the Bridge of Ayr, with approaches thereto, in the county of Ayr; and for other purposes. (Repealed by Ayr Bridge Act 1884 (47 & 48 Vict. c. xxxv))
Great North of Scotland Railway Act 1877	40 & 41 Vict. c. lxvii	28 June 1877
An Act for conferring further Powers on the Great North of Scotland Railway Company with relation to their Undertaking.
West Kent Main Sewerage (Amendment) Act 1877	40 & 41 Vict. c. lxviii	28 June 1877
An Act for authorising the West Kent Main Sewerage Board to construct a new Sewer, and for amending the West Kent Main Sewerage Act, 1875; (Note: West Kent Main Sewerage Act 1875 (38 & 39 Vict. c. clxiii)) and for other purposes.
Pontypridd Markets, Fairs, and Town Hall Act 1877	40 & 41 Vict. c. lxix	28 June 1877
An Act to incorporate a Company for establishing and holding Markets and Fairs and building a Town Hall in the town of Pontypridd and parish of Llanwonno in the county of Glamorgan; and for other purposes.
Great Northern Railway (Ireland) Act 1877	40 & 41 Vict. c. lxx	28 June 1877
An Act to confirm the amalgamation of the Dublin and Drogheda, Dublin and Belfast Junction, Irish North-western, and Ulster Railway Companies into one Company under the name of "Great Northern Railway Company (Ireland)," and to define and extend the powers of that Company; and for other purposes.
Great Northern Railway (Ireland) Transfer Act 1877	40 & 41 Vict. c. lxxi	28 June 1877
An Act to transfer to the "Great Northern Railway Company (Ireland)" the Banbridge Junction Railway, the Banbridge, Lisburn, and Belfast Railway, the Banbridge Extension Railway, and the powers of the Dungannon and Cookstown Railway Company, and to grant further powers with respect to the two last-named undertakings; and for other purposes.
Marriages Legalization, Saint Peter's, Almondsbury, Act 1877 (repealed)	40 & 41 Vict. c. lxxii	28 June 1877
An Act to render valid Marriages heretofore solemnized in the Chapel of Ease called Saint Peter's Church, in the Parish of Almondsbury, in the County of Gloucester. (Repealed by Statute Law (Repeals) Act 1977 (c. 18))
Local Government Board's (Gas) Provisional Orders Confirmation (Penrith, &c.) Act 1877	40 & 41 Vict. c. lxxiii	28 June 1877
An Act to confirm certain Provisional Orders of the Local Government Board under the Provisions of the Gas and Water Works Facilities Act, 1870, (Note: Gas and Water Works Facilities Act 1870 (33 & 34 Vict. c. 70)) and the Public Health Act, 1875, (Note: Public Health Act 1875 (38 & 39 Vict. c. 55)) relating to the Local Government Districts of Penrith, Silsden, and Ynyscynhaiarn.
	Penrith Gas Order 1877	
	Silsden Gas Order 1877	
	Ynyscynhaiarn Gas Order 1877	
Pier and Harbour Orders Confirmation Act 1877 (No. 3)	40 & 41 Vict. c. lxxiv	28 June 1877
An Act to confirm certain Provisional Order made by the Board of Trade under the General Pier and Harbour Act, 1861, (Note: General Pier and Harbour Act 1861 (24 & 25 Vict. c. 45)) relating to Carnarvon.
	Carnarvon Harbour Order 1877	
Education Department Provisional Orders Confirmation (Cardiff, &c.) Act 1877	40 & 41 Vict. c. lxxv	28 June 1877
An Act to confirm certain Provisional Orders made by the Education Department under "The Elementary Education Act, 1870," (Note: Elementary Education Act 1870 (33 & 34 Vict. c. 75)) to enable the School Boards for Cardiff, the United District of East and West Teignmouth, Holywell (Extra-Municipal), Hornsey, Merthyr Tydfil, and Ystradgunlais Lower, to put in force "The Lands Clauses Consolidation Act, 1845," (Note: Lands Clauses Consolidation Act 1845 (8 & 9 Vict. c. 18)) and the Acts amending the same.
	Cardiff Order (1) 1877	
	Cardiff Order (2) 1877	
	East and West Teignmouth Order 1877	
	Holywell Order 1877	
	Hornsey Order 1877	
	Merthyr Tydfil Order 1877	
	Ystradgunlais Order 1877	
Gas and Water Orders Confirmation (Brotton, &c.) Act 1877	40 & 41 Vict. c. lxxvi	28 June 1877
An Act for confirming certain Provisional Orders made by the Board of Trade under the Gas and Water Works Facilities Act, 1870, relating to Brotton Gas, Guisbrough Gas, Bridport Water, Burgess Hill Water, Ruthin Water, and Pickering Gas and Water.
	Brotton Gas Order 1877	
	Guisborough Gas Order 1877	
	Bridport Water Order 1877	
	Burgess Hill and St. John's Common Water Order 1877	
	Ruthin Water Order 1877	
	Pickering Gas and Water Order 1877	
Local Government Board's Provisional Orders Confirmation (Altrincham, &c.) Act 1877	40 & 41 Vict. c. lxxvii	28 June 1877
An Act to confirm certain Provisional Orders of the Local Government Board relating to the Rural Sanitary District of the Altrincham Union, the Local Government Districts of Blaydon and Brandon and Byshottles, the Boroughs of Nottingham and Stoke-upon-Trent, the Local Government Districts of Tong Street and Torquay, and the City of Winchester.
	Altrincham Order 1877	
	Blaydon Order 1877	
	Brandon and Byshottles Order 1877	
	Nottingham Order 1877	
	Stoke-upon-Trent Order 1877	
	Tong Street Order 1877	
	Torquay Order 1877	
	Winchester Order 1877	
Melton Mowbray Navigation (Abandonment) Act 1877	40 & 41 Vict. c. lxxviii	12 July 1877
An Act to provide for the closing of the undertaking of the Company of Proprietors of the Navigation from the Leicester Navigation to Melton Mowbray, in the county of Leicester, and for the dissolution of the said Company, and the winding up of the affairs thereof; and for other purposes.
Bristol and Portishead Pier and Railway Company's Act 1877	40 & 41 Vict. c. lxxix	12 July 1877
An Act to confer further Powers on the Bristol and Portishead Pier and Railway Company; and for other purposes.
Great Northern Railway Act 1877	40 & 41 Vict. c. lxxx	12 July 1877
An Act for conferring further Powers on the Great Northern Railway Company with relation to their Undertaking; and for other purposes.
Southampton Harbour Act 1877 (repealed)	40 & 41 Vict. c. lxxxi	12 July 1877
An Act for enlarging the powers of the Southampton Harbour and Pier Board with reference to the borrowing of Money; and for other purposes. (Repealed by SI 1968/941)
Rathmines and Pembroke Main Drainage and Improvement Act 1877	40 & 41 Vict. c. lxxxii	12 July 1877
An Act to authorise the construction by a Board specially constituted of Outfall and other Sewers for the township of Rathmines and Rathgar and the Pembroke Township, in the county of Dublin; to release those townships from the provisions of "The Dublin Main Drainage and Purification of Liffey Act, 1871," (Note: Dublin Main Drainage and Purification of Liffey Act 1871 (34 & 35 Vict. c. cxxviii)) and of "The Sanitary Law (Dublin) Amendment Acts, 1870 to 1875;" to confer certain additional powers upon the Township Commissioners within their respective townships; to alter the Date of Election of Commissioners in the Rathmines and Rathgar Township; and for other purposes.
Great Eastern Railway Act 1877	40 & 41 Vict. c. lxxxiii	12 July 1877
An Act for authorising the Great Eastern Railway Company to make a Railway and other Works, and for conferring on them further Powers in relation to their Undertaking, and to vest in them the Undertaking of the Saffron Walden Railway Company; and for other purposes.
Bristol United Gaslight Company's (Additional Lands) Act 1877	40 & 41 Vict. c. lxxxiv	12 July 1877
An Act to authorise the Bristol United Gaslight Company to purchase additional lands for the purposes of their undertaking.
Metropolitan Railway Act 1877	40 & 41 Vict. c. lxxxv	12 July 1877
An Act t6 authorise the Metropolitan Railway Company to acquire land in the neighbourhood of their Aldgate Station, and to make a tunnel under Aldgate High Street; to dissolve the joint committee for the purchase of land for the Metropolitan and District Railways, and to confer upon the Metropolitan Railway Company various powers in connexion with their share and loan capital and the Saint John's Wood Railway; and to revive and extend the time for purchasing land and completing certain authorised Railways and works of the Saint John's Wood Railway Company and the Kingsbury and Harrow Railway Company; and for other purposes.
Midland Railway (Further Powers) Act 1877	40 & 41 Vict. c. lxxxvi	12 July 1877
An Act for conferring on the Midland Railway Company further Powers in relation to their own Undertaking and the Undertakings of other Companies; and for other purposes.
Newcastle and Gateshead Waterworks Act 1877	40 & 41 Vict. c. lxxxvii	12 July 1877
An Act to authorise the Newcastle and Gateshead Water Company to abandon the Construction of the Upper Swinburn Reservoir and other Works, and to construct a New Reservoir and Works in lieu thereof; and for other purposes.
Ryde and Newport Railway Act 1877	40 & 41 Vict. c. lxxxviii	12 July 1877
An Act for confirming an agreement between the Ryde and Newport and the Cowes and Newport Railway Companies, for the enlargement of the Cowes Station and the extension of the Cowes and Newport Railway at Cowes, for improving the Approaches to the Joint Station at Newport, for making a Railway or Siding in the parish of Northwood, with a Landing-stage on the River Medina; and for other purposes relating to the Ryde and Newport and Cowes and Newport Railway Companies and their respective Undertakings.
Midland and Eastern and Norwich and Spalding Railway Companies Amalgamation Act 1877	40 & 41 Vict. c. lxxxix	12 July 1877
An Act for the Amalgamation of the Midland and Eastern and Norwich and Spalding Railway Companies; and for other purposes.
Alexandra Palace Act 1877	40 & 41 Vict. c. xc	12 July 1877
An Act to authorise a Sale of part of the Alexandra Palace Grounds discharged from certain conditions of "The Muswell Hill Estate and Railways Act, 1866;" (Note: Muswell Hill Estate and Railways Act 1866 (29 & 30 Vict. c. ccxc)) and to make provision for keeping open the said Palace and Grounds; and for other purposes.
London and North-western Railway (Joint and Various Powers) Act 1877	40 & 41 Vict. c. xci	12 July 1877
An Act for conferring further powers on the London and North-western Railway Company and other Companies in relation to their Joint Undertakings, and for granting to the London and North-western Railway Company various other powers in relation to their own Undertaking and the Undertakings of other Companies.
Tasmanian Main Line Railway Act 1877	40 & 41 Vict. c. xcii	12 July 1877
An Act for enabling the Tasmanian Main Line Railway Company, Limited, to attach a First Preference to a further amount of Debenture Bonds; and for other purposes.
Tyne Improvement Act 1877	40 & 41 Vict. c. xciii	12 July 1877
An Act for altering and consolidating certain Dues levied by the Tyne Improvement Commissioners; and for other purposes.
Waterford and Central Ireland Railway (Transfer) Act 1877	40 & 41 Vict. c. xciv	12 July 1877
An Act to transfer to the Waterford and Central Ireland. Railway Company the authorised Joint Undertaking of that Company and of the Kilkenny Junction Railway Company; to confer additional Powers with respect thereto; and for other purposes.
New Zealand and Australian Land Company, Limited, Act 1877	40 & 41 Vict. c. xcv	12 July 1877
An Act for the Amalgamation of the Canterbury and Otago Association, Limited, with the New Zealand and Australian Land Company, Limited and Reduced; and for other purposes.
Plymouth, Devonport, and Stonehouse Carriages and Boats Act 1877 (repealed)	40 & 41 Vict. c. xcvi	12 July 1877
An Act to repeal an Act for regulating Hackney Coaches and other Carriages, Boats, and Wherries within the several parishes of Saint Andrew and Charles, in the borough of Plymouth, the parish of East Stonehouse and the parish of Stoke Damerel, in the borough of Devonport, and for amending two several Acts for repairing certain Roads leading from the borough of Plymouth aforesaid to Stonehouse Bridge and Plymouth Dock, all in the county of Devon, and to make better provisions in lien thereof; and for other purposes. (Repealed by Plymouth Corporation Act 1915 (5 & 6 Geo. 5. c. lxix))
Pier and Harbour Orders Confirmation Act 1877 (No. 1)	40 & 41 Vict. c. xcvii	12 July 1877
An Act to confirm certain Provisional Orders made by the Board of Trade under The General Pier and Harbour Act, 1861, relating to Barremman (Gareloch), Brixham, Hornsea (North), Hornsea (South), Lynmouth, Rosslare, Ryde, and Towyn.
	Barremman (Gare Loch) Pier Order 1877	
	Brixham Harbour Order 1877	
	Hornsea (North) Pier Order 1877	
	Hornsea (South) Pier Order 1877	
	Lynmouth Pier and Harbour Order 1877	
	Rosslare Harbour Order 1877	
	Ryde Pier Order 1877	
	Towyn Pier Order 1877	
Norfolk and Suffolk Fisheries Act 1877	40 & 41 Vict. c. xcviii	12 July 1877
An Act to preserve the Fisheries in the Navigable Rivers and Broads of the counties of Norfolk and Suffolk and the county of the city of Norwich.
Metropolis Toll Bridges Act 1877	40 & 41 Vict. c. xcix	12 July 1877
An Act to provide for throwing open for the free use of the Public certain Toll Bridges within the Metropolis.
City of London (Golden Lane and Petticoat Square, &c.) Improvement Provisional Order Confirmation Act 1877	40 & 41 Vict. c. c	12 July 1877
An Act to confirm a Provisional Order of one of Her Majesty's Principal Secretaries of State for the Improvement of certain Unhealthy Areas in the City of London.
	Golden Lane, Petticoat Square, &c. Order 1877	
General Police and Improvement (Scotland) Act 1862 Order Confirmation (Dumbarton) Act 1877	40 & 41 Vict. c. ci	12 July 1877
An Act to confirm a Provisional Order under "The General Police and Improvement (Scotland) Act, 1862," relating to the Burgh of Dumbarton.
	Dumbarton Order 1877	
Greenock Improvement Provisional Order Confirmation Act 1877	40 & 41 Vict. c. cii	12 July 1877
An Act to confirm a Provisional Order of one of Her Majesty's Principal Secretaries of State for the Improvement of Unhealthy Areas in the Parliamentary Burgh of Greenock.
	Greenock Order 1877	
Metropolis (Goulston Street, Flower and Dean Street, Whitechapel, &c.) Improvement Provisional Orders Confirmation Act 1877	40 & 41 Vict. c. ciii	12 July 1877
An Act to confirm certain Provisional Orders of one of Her Majesty's Principal Secretaries of State for the Improvement of certain Areas within the Metropolis.
	Goulston Street and Flower and Dean Street, Whitechapel Order 1877	
	St. George the Martyr, Southwark Order 1877	
	Bedfordbury, St. Martin-in-the-Fields and Strand Order 1877	
Education Department Provisional Order Confirmation (London) Act 1877	40 & 41 Vict. c. civ	12 July 1877
An Act to confirm a Provisional Order made by the Education Department under "The Elementary Education Act, 1870," to enable the School Board for London to put in force "The Lands Clauses Consolidation Act,-1845," and the Acts amending the same.
	London Order 1877	
Freshwater, Yarmouth, and Newport Railway (Abandonment) Act 1877 (repealed)	40 & 41 Vict. c. cv	23 July 1877
An Act for the Abandonment of the Railways and Road authorised by the Freshwater, Yarmouth, and Newport Railway Act, 1873. (Note: Freshwater, Yarmouth, and Newport Railway Act 1873 (36 & 37 Vict. c. cxxxvi)) (Repealed by Statute Law (Repeals) Act 2013 (c. 2))
West Surrey Water Act 1877	40 & 41 Vict. c. cvi	23 July 1877
An Act to authorise the West Surrey Water Company to raise additional Capital; and for other purposes.
South-western and Brighton Railway Companies (Isle of Wight and Ryde Pier Railway) Act 1877	40 & 41 Vict. c. cvii	23 July 1877
An Act to authorise the Construction of a Railway and Railway Pier at Ryde, in the Isle of Wight; and for other purposes.
South-western Railway (Various Powers) Act 1877	40 & 41 Vict. c. cviii	23 July 1877
An Act to confer further powers upon the London and South-western Railway Company in respect of their Undertaking, and to enable them and certain other Railway Companies jointly or severally to acquire additional Lands; and for other purposes.
Banbury and Cheltenham Direct Railway Act 1877	40 & 41 Vict. c. cix	23 July 1877
An Act to empower the Banbury and Cheltenham Direct Railway Company to make a Deviation of their authorised Railway, and to make a New Railway, and to execute other works and exercise other powers, and to raise further Money, and to extend the Time limited for the Construction of their authorised Railway; and for other purposes.
Great Western Railway Act 1877	40 & 41 Vict. c. cx	23 July 1877
An Act for empowering the Great Western Railway Company to make new roads and other works; for vesting in the Great Western Railway Company the undertaking of the Bala and Dolgelly Railway Company; for conferring further powers upon the Great Western Railway Company and other Companies in relation to their respective undertakings; for conferring powers upon the Great Western Railway Company and the Corporation of Bristol in relation to Princes Street Bridge; and for other purposes.
North Metropolitan Tramways (New Works) Act 1877	40 & 41 Vict. c. cxi	23 July 1877
An Act to confer further powers on the North Metropolitan Tramways Company with reference to the construction of works and the raising of money; and for other purposes.
Derry Central Railway Act 1877	40 & 41 Vict. c. cxii	23 July 1877
An Act for conferring further powers upon the Derry Central Railway Company, and for authorising the Belfast and Northern Counties Railway Company to raise additional capital and to subscribe towards the undertaking of the Derry Central Railway Company; and for other purposes.
Dover Corporation (Sea Defences) Act 1877 (repealed)	40 & 41 Vict. c. cxiii	23 July 1877
An Act for empowering the Corporation of Dover to construct certain Sea Defences in and near the parishes of East Cliffe and Guston, and to charge the expenses thereof on the owners of property benefited thereby; and for other purposes. (Repealed by County of Kent Act 1981 (c. xviii))
Worcester and Aberystwith Junction Railway (Deviation) Act 1877 (repealed)	40 & 41 Vict. c. cxiv	23 July 1877
An Act for authorising the Worcester and Aberystwith Junction Railway Company to abandon the construction of the railway authorised by the Worcester and Aberystwith Junction Railway Act, 1874, and to construct another railway in lieu thereof; and for other purposes. (Repealed by Worcester and Aberystwyth Junction Railway (Abandonment) Act 1880 (43 & 44 Vict. c. xii))
Blackburn Borough Gas, Water, and Extension Act 1877	40 & 41 Vict. c. cxv	23 July 1877
An Act to extend the Borough of Blackburn; to enable the Mayor, Aldermen, and Burgesses thereof to abandon the construction of certain Waterworks, and to make and maintain other Waterworks; to acquire the undertaking of the Blackburn Gaslight Company; and for other purposes.
King's Lynn Dock Act 1877	40 & 41 Vict. c. cxvi	23 July 1877
An Act to confer further Powers upon the King's Lynn Dock Company; and for other purposes.
Crystal Palace Company's Act 1877 (repealed)	40 & 41 Vict. c. cxvii	23 July 1877
An Act to grant further powers to the Crystal Palace Company with respect to their Capital and Undertaking. (Repealed by London County Council (Crystal Palace) Act 1951 (14 & 15 Geo. 6. c. xxviii))
Derby Corporation Act 1877	40 & 41 Vict. c. cxviii	23 July 1877
An Act for extending the Boundaries of the Borough of Derby, in the County of Derby; and for other purposes.
Ramsgate Local Board Act 1877 (repealed)	40 & 41 Vict. c. cxix	23 July 1877
An Act authorising the Local Board for the district of Ramsgate, in the county of Kent, to purchase the Undertaking of the Company of Proprietors of the Ramsgate Waterworks, and part of the Undertaking of the Isle of Thanet Gaslight and CokeCompany; to supply Water and to make and supply Gas; and for other purposes. (Repealed by County of Kent Act 1981 (c. xviii))
Severn and Wye Railway and Canal Act 1877	40 & 41 Vict. c. cxx	23 July 1877
An Act to enable the Severn and Wye Railway and Canal Company to raise further Money; and for other purposes.
New Forest Act 1877	40 & 41 Vict. c. cxxi	23 July 1877
An Act to amend the Administration of the Law relating to the New Forest in the County of Southampton; and for other purposes.
Local Government Board (Ireland) Provisional Orders (Artizans and Labourers Dwellings) Confirmation Act 1877	40 & 41 Vict. c. cxxii	23 July 1877
An Act for confirming certain Provisional Orders of the Local Government Board for Ireland relating to the Borough of Belfast and the City of Dublin.
	Belfast Order 1877	
	Dublin Order 1877	
Local Government Board (Ireland) Provisional Orders (Ennis, &c.) Confirmation Act 1877	40 & 41 Vict. c. cxxiii	23 July 1877
An Act for confirming certain Provisional Orders of the Local Government Board for Ireland relating to Waterworks in the Towns of Ennis, Limavady, and Strabane.
	Ennis Waterworks Provisional Order 1877	
	Limavady Waterworks Provisional Order 1877	
	Strabane Waterworks Provisional Order 1877	
Tramways Orders Confirmation Act 1877	40 & 41 Vict. c. cxxiv	23 July 1877
An Act for confirming certain Provisional Orders made by the Board of Trade under the Tramways Act, 1870, (Note: Tramways Act 1870 (33 & 34 Vict. c. 78)) relating to Barton, Eccles, Winton, and Monton Local Board Tramways, Bristol Tramways (Extensions), Hull Street Tramways (Extension), Manchester Suburban Tramways, Nottingham and District Tramways, Portsea Street Tramways, Rusholme Local Board of Health Tramways, and Wolverhampton Tramways.
	Barton, Eccles, Winton and Monton Local Board Tramways Order 1877	
	Bristol Tramways (Extension) Order 1877	
	Hull Street Tramways (Extension) Order 1877	
	Manchester Suburban Tramways Order 1877	
	Nottingham and District Tramways Order 1877	
	Portsea Street Tramways Order 1877	
	Rusholme Local Board of Health Tramways Order 1877	
	Wolverhampton Tramways Order 1877	
Local Government Board's Provisional Orders Confirmation (Bridlington, &c.) Act 1877	40 & 41 Vict. c. cxxv	23 July 1877
An Act to confirm certain Provisional Orders of the Local Government Board relating to the Local Government Districts of Bridlington, Dinas, and Grange, the Borough of Hastings, and the Local Government Districts of Pudsey, Tunbridge Wells, and Whittington.
	Bridlington Order 1877	
	Dinas Order 1877	
	Grange Order 1877	
	Hastings Order 1877	
	Pudsey Order 1877	
	Tunbridge Wells Order 1877	
	Whittington Order 1877	
Oyster and Mussel Fisheries Order Confirmation Act 1877	40 & 41 Vict. c. cxxvi	23 July 1877
An Act to confirm an Order made by the Board of Trade under The Sea Fisheries Act, 1868, (Note: Sea Fisheries Act 1868 (31 & 32 Vict. c. 45)) relating to Falmouth.
	Falmouth Fishery Order 1877	
Commissioners of Public Works in Ireland Provisional Order (Dungannon Water and Sewerage Works) Confirmation Act 1877	40 & 41 Vict. c. cxxvii	23 July 1877
An Act to confirm a Provisional Order under The Local Government Act, 1858, (Note: Local Government Act 1858 (21 & 22 Vict. c. 98)) and The Sewage Utilization Act, 1865, (Note: Sewage Utilization Act 1865 (28 & 29 Vict. c. 75)) relating to Dungannon.
	Dungannon Water and Sewerage Works Order 1877	
General Police and Improvement (Scotland) Act 1862 Order Confirmation (Glasgow) Act 1877 (repealed)	40 & 41 Vict. c. cxxviii	23 July 1877
An Act to confirm a Provisional Order under "The General Police and Improvement (Scotland) Act, 1862," relating to the Royal Burgh of Glasgow. (Repealed by Statute Law (Repeals) Act 1995 (c. 44))
Local Government Board (Ireland) Provisional Orders (Holywood, &c.) Confirmation Act 1877	40 & 41 Vict. c. cxxix	23 July 1877
An Act for confirming certain Provisional Orders of the Local Government Board for Ireland relating to Waterworks in the Towns of Holywood and Greystones.
	Holywood Waterworks Provisional Order 1877	
	Greystones Waterworks Provisional Order 1877	
Education Department Provisional Orders Confirmation (Felmingham, &c.) Act 1877	40 & 41 Vict. c. cxxx	23 July 1877
An Act to confirm certain Provisional Orders made by the Education Department under "The Elementary Education Act, 1870," to enable the School Boards for the United District of Felmingham and Kelvedon Hatch to put in force "The Lands Clauses Consolidation Act, 1845," and the Acts amending the same.
	Felmingham Order 1877	
	Kelvedon Order 1877	
Gas and Water Orders Confirmation (Abingdon, &c.) Act 1877	40 & 41 Vict. c. cxxxi	23 July 1877
An Act for confirming certain Provisional Orders made by the Board of Trade under the Gas and Water Works Facilities Act, 1870, relating to Abingdon Gas, Cranleigh Gas, Horsham Gas, Mansfield Gas, Newcastle-under-Lyme Gas, North Camp and Farnborough District Gas, and Southbank and Normanby Gas.
	Abingdon Gas Order 1877	
	Cranleigh Gas Order 1877	
	Horsham Gas Order 1877	
	Mansfield Gas Order 1877	
	Newcastle-under-Lyme Gas Order 1877	
	North Camp and Farnborough District Gas Order 1877	
	Southbank and Normanby Gas Order 1877	
Local Government Board's Provisional Orders Confirmation (Belper Union, &c.) Act 1877	40 & 41 Vict. c. cxxxii	23 July 1877
An Act to confirm certain Provisional Orders of the Local Government Board relating to the Rural Sanitary District of the Belper Union, the Borough of Chipping Norton, the Local Government District of Clay Lane, the City of Exeter, the Borough of Droitwich, the Improvement Act District of Haverfordwest, the Rural Sanitary District of the Hendon Union, the Local Government District of Hexham, the Boroughs of Kingston-upon-Hull, Portsmouth, and Saint Helens, the Local Government District of Southend, the Borough of Sunderland, the Local Government District of Sutton-in-Ashfield, and the City of York.
	Belper Union Order 1877	
	Chipping Norton Order 1877	
	Clay Lane Order 1877	
	Exeter Order 1877	
	Droitwich Order 1877	
	Haverfordwest Order 1877	
	Hendon Union Order 1877	
	Hexham Order 1877	
	Kingston-upon-Hull Order 1877	
	Portsmouth Order 1877	
	St. Helens Order 1877	
	Southend Order 1877	
	Sunderland Order 1877	
	Sutton-in-Ashfield Order 1877	
	York Order 1877	
Metropolis (Great Wild Street, &c.) Improvement Provisional Orders Confirmation Act 1877	40 & 41 Vict. c. cxxxiii	23 July 1877
An Act to confirm certain Provisional Orders of one of Her Majesty's Principal Secretaries of State for the Improvement of certain Unhealthy Areas within the Metropolis.
	Great Wild Street, St. Giles-in-the-Fields Order 1877	
	Pear Tree Court, Clerkenwell Order 1877	
	Whitecross Street, St. Luke Order 1877	
	High Street, Islington Order 1877	
	Old Pye Street, Westminster Order 1877	
Saint Stephen's Green (Dublin) Act 1877	40 & 41 Vict. c. cxxxiv	23 July 1877
An Act to vest Saint Stephen's Green, Dublin, in the Commissioners of Public Works in Ireland; for maintaining and regulating the same as a Public Park; and for other purposes.
Londonderry Gas Act 1877	40 & 41 Vict. c. cxxxv	2 August 1877
An Act for dissolving and re-incorporating the Londonderry Gaslight Company, and granting Powers for supplying with Gas the City of Londonderry and the Liberties thereof.
Kettering, Thrapston, and Huntingdon Railway Act 1877	40 & 41 Vict. c. cxxxvi	2 August 1877
An Act to enable the Kettering, Thrapston, and Huntingdon, Railway Company to make further provisions in relation to their Capital.
Llantrissant and Taff Vale Junction Railway (Extension of Time) Act 1877	40 & 41 Vict. c. cxxxvii	2 August 1877
An Act for further extending the time for the completion of Railway No. 1 authorised by the Llantrissant and Taff Vale Junction Railway Act, 1866. (Note: Llantrissant and Taff Vale Junction Railway Act 1866 (29 & 30 Vict. c. ccxlviii))
Maidstone Bridge Act 1877 (repealed)	40 & 41 Vict. c. cxxxviii	2 August 1877
An Act for authorising the construction of a Bridge over the River Medway at Maidstone; and for other purposes. (Repealed by County of Kent Act 1981 (c. xviii))
Midland Great Western Railway of Ireland Act 1877 (repealed)	40 & 41 Vict. c. cxxxix	2 August 1877
An Act to confer further powers on the Midland Great Western Railway of Ireland Company. (Repealed by Statute Law (Repeals) Act 2013 (c. 2))
Coatbridge Gas Act 1877	40 & 41 Vict. c. cxl	2 August 1877
An Act for dissolving the Coatbridge Gaslight Company, and incorporating the Proprietors therein, with others, and conferring Powers on the Company so to be incorporated; and for other purposes.
City of Exeter Extension Act 1877 (repealed)	40 & 41 Vict. c. cxli	2 August 1877
An Act for extending the Boundaries of the Municipal Borough and City and County of the City of Exeter so as to include the Parish of Saint Leonard in the County of Devon, and for extending the operation of certain Local Acts; and for other purposes. (Repealed by Exeter City Council Act 1987 (c. xi))
Gateshead Improvement Act 1877 (repealed)	40 & 41 Vict. c. cxlii	2 August 1877
An Act for increasing the number and altering the Boundaries of the Wards of the Borough of Gateshead; and for increasing the number of Aldermen and Councillors for the said borough; and for authorising the Mayor, Aldermen, and Burgesses of the borough to raise further Moneys; and for the further improvement of the borough; and for other purposes. (Repealed by Tyne and Wear Act 1980 (c. xliii))
Wakefield Gas Act 1877	40 & 41 Vict. c. cxliii	2 August 1877
An Act to authorise the Wakefield Gaslight Company to purchase land, construct Gasworks, and raise additional Capital; and for other purposes.
Usk and Towy Railway Act 1877 (repealed)	40 & 41 Vict. c. cxliv	2 August 1877
An Act to authorise an Extension of Time to the Usk and Towy Railway Company for purchasing Land and completing their Railway. (Repealed by Statute Law (Repeals) Act 2013 (c. 2))
Woolwich, Plumstead, and Charlton Consumers Gas Act 1877	40 & 41 Vict. c. cxlv	2 August 1877
An Act to enable the Woolwich, Plumstead, and Charlton Consumers Gas Company to raise a further sum of money.
Christchurch Gas Act 1877	40 & 41 Vict. c. cxlvi	2 August 1877
An Act for dissolving the Christchurch Gas Company (Limited), for re-incorporating the Proprietors' therein with others, and for conferring powers on the Company so to be incorporated; and for other purposes.
Lowestoft Water, Gas, and Market Act 1877	40 & 41 Vict. c. cxlvii	2 August 1877
An Act to authorise the Lowestoft Water, Gas, and Market Company to make New Service Reservoirs and other Works, and to raise more Money; and for other purposes.
Severn Bridge Railway Act 1877	40 & 41 Vict. c. cxlviii	2 August 1877
An Act for conferring additional powers on the Severn Bridge Railway Company; and for other purposes.
Paisley Improvement Act 1877	40 & 41 Vict. c. cxlix	2 August 1877
An Act for improving the burgh of Paisley, in the county of Renfrew, by the construction, widening, and alteration of Streets and Bridges; for vesting in the Town Council, as road trustees of the burgh, the management of all the streets and bridges therein; for the acquisition of lands for municipal buildings; and for other purposes.
Leicester Gas Act 1877	40 & 41 Vict. c. cl	2 August 1877
An Act for granting further Powers to the Leicester Gas Company.
Newcastle-upon-Tyne Tramways and Improvement Act 1877 (repealed)	40 & 41 Vict. c. cli	2 August 1877
An Act to authorise the Mayor, Aldermen, and Burgesses of the Borough of Newcastle-upon-Tyne to make certain Street Improvements; to construct Street Tramways; to increase the accommodation of the Public Quays and Wharves; and for other purposes. (Repealed by Tyne and Wear Act 1980 (c. xliii))
Heywood Waterworks Act 1877	40 & 41 Vict. c. clii	2 August 1877
An Act to enable the Heywood Waterworks Company to construct additional Works; and for other purposes.
North Cheshire Water Act 1877	40 & 41 Vict. c. cliii	2 August 1877
An Act for conferring further powers on the North Cheshire Water Company for the raising of Money and otherwise in relation to their Undertaking.
Southend Gas Act 1877	40 & 41 Vict. c. cliv	2 August 1877
An Act for incorporating the Southend Gas Company, and for conferring Powers on them with reference to the construction and maintenance of Works, the supply of Gas, and otherwise; and for other purposes.
Carnforth District Waterworks Act 1877	40 & 41 Vict. c. clv	2 August 1877
An Act for incorporating and conferring powers on the Carnforth District Waterworks Company.
East London Railway Act 1877	40 & 41 Vict. c. clvi	2 August 1877
An Act to enable the East London Railway Company to raise further Capital, and to make further provision with respect to their authorised Junction with the Main Line of the Great Eastern Railway; and for other purposes.
Bury and Tottington District Railway Act 1877	40 & 41 Vict. c. clvii	2 August 1877
An Act for making a Railway from Bury to Tottington, with branches, in the county palatine of Lancaster.
Cork Harbour Act 1877	40 & 41 Vict. c. clviii	2 August 1877
An Act to enable the Cork Harbour Commissioners to make further Improvements in the Harbour of Cork; to levy certain additional Rates for the use of the Harbour; and for other purposes.
Colne Gas Act 1877	40 & 41 Vict. c. clix	2 August 1877
An Act for effecting the Sale and Transfer to the Colne and Marsden Local Board of the Undertaking of the Colne Gas Company; and for other purposes.
Cranbrook and Paddock Wood Railway Act 1877	40 & 41 Vict. c. clx	2 August 1877
An Act for making a Railway from Cranbrook to Paddock Wood, in the County of Kent.
Perth Water Act 1877	40 & 41 Vict. c. clxi	2 August 1877
An Act for authorising the construction of additional Waterworks, and for providing an increased Supply of Water to the City and Royal Burgh of Perth and places adjacent; and for other purposes.
Sunningdale District Water Act 1877	40 & 41 Vict. c. clxii	2 August 1877
An Act for incorporating the Sunningdale District Water Company; and for other purposes.
Thanet Gas Act 1877	40 & 41 Vict. c. clxiii	2 August 1877
An Act to confer further powers upon the Isle of Thanet Gaslight and Coke Company; and for other purposes.
East Worcestershire Water Act 1877	40 & 41 Vict. c. clxiv	2 August 1877
An Act for incorporating the East Worcestershire Waterworks Company; and for other purposes.
Glasgow Corporation Waterworks Amendment Act 1877	40 & 41 Vict. c. clxv	2 August 1877
An Act to authorise the Commissioners of the Glasgow Corporation Waterworks to raise a further sum of money to construct additional works and acquire additional lands; and for other purposes.
Clacton-on-Sea Railway Act 1877	40 & 41 Vict. c. clxvi	2 August 1877
An Act for making a Railway from Clacton-on-Sea to the Tendring Hundred Railway, in the County of Essex; and for other purposes.
Glasgow Police Act 1877 (repealed)	40 & 41 Vict. c. clxvii	2 August 1877
An Act to enable the Board of Police of Glasgow to effect certain Street and other Improvements in the City of Glasgow; to raise further Moneys; to acquire additional Lands; and for other purposes. (Repealed by Statute Law (Repeals) Act 1995 (c. 44))
Hove Commissioners Act 1877 (repealed)	40 & 41 Vict. c. clxviii	2 August 1877
An Act for conferring further Powers on the Hove Commissioners; and for other purposes. (Repealed by East Sussex Act 1981 (c. xxv))
Leeds Tramways Act 1877 (repealed)	40 & 41 Vict. c. clxix	2 August 1877
An Act for enabling the Leeds Tramways Company to make additional Tramways; and for other purposes. (Repealed by Leeds Corporation (Consolidation) Act 1905 (5 Edw. 7. c. i))
Leicester Tramways Act 1877 (repealed)	40 & 41 Vict. c. clxx	2 August 1877
An Act for incorporating and conferring powers on the Leicester Tramways Company. (Repealed by Leicestershire Act 1985 (c. xvii))
Ashton-under-Lyne Improvement Act 1877	40 & 41 Vict. c. clxxi	2 August 1877
An Act for authorising the Mayor, Aldermen, and Burgesses of the Borough of Ashton-under-Lyne, in the county of Lancaster, to extend the Town Hall, Markets, and Public Offices of the Borough, and to borrow further Moneys; and for making further provision for the Improvement and Local Government of the Borough; and for other purposes.
Newcastle-under-Lyme Corporation Act 1877	40 & 41 Vict. c. clxxii	2 August 1877
An Act for extending the Boundaries of the Borough of Newcastle-under-Lyme, in the County of Stafford; for empowering the Corporation to acquire the Undertaking of the Newcastle-under-Lyme Gaslight Company; and for other purposes.
Bridgwater (Corporation) Water Act 1877	40 & 41 Vict. c. clxxiii	2 August 1877
An Act for empowering the Mayor, Aldermen, and Burgesses of the Borough of Bridgwater to make Waterworks, and to supply the Borough and Neighbourhood with Water; and for other purposes.
Bromley Direct Railway Act 1877	40 & 41 Vict. c. clxxiv	2 August 1877
An Act to amend the Acts relating to "The Bromley Direct Railway Company;" to raise additional Capital; and for other purposes.
Carshalton Gas Act 1877	40 & 41 Vict. c. clxxv	2 August 1877
An Act for dissolving the Carshalton Gas and Coke Company (Limited); for re-incorporating the Proprietors therein with others, and for conferring Powers on the Company so to be incorporated; and for other purposes.
Croydon Gas Act 1877	40 & 41 Vict. c. clxxvi	2 August 1877
An Act to authorise the Croydon Commercial Gas and Coke Company to acquire further Lands by Agreement; to extend their Works; to raise additional Capital; and for other purposes.
Golden Valley Railway (Extension to Hay) Act 1877	40 & 41 Vict. c. clxxvii	2 August 1877
An Act to authorise the Golden Valley Railway Company to extend their Railway to Hay; and for other purposes.
Leeds Improvement Act 1877	40 & 41 Vict. c. clxxviii	2 August 1877
An Act to enable the Mayor, Aldermen, and Burgesses of the Borough of Leeds to increase and improve their Gasworks and Waterworks, and to make further provision for the Local Government and Improvement of the said Borough; and for other purposes.
Limerick and Kerry Railway Act 1877	40 & 41 Vict. c. clxxix	2 August 1877
An Act to confer further Powers on the Limerick and Kerry Railway Company.
Loose Valley Railway Act 1877	40 & 41 Vict. c. clxxx	2 August 1877
An Act for making Railways in the County of Kent, to be called "The Loose Valley Railway"; and for other purposes.
South-eastern Railway Act 1877	40 & 41 Vict. c. clxxxi	2 August 1877
An Act for extending the Time for completion of Works at Bermondsey, and for the purchase of Lands for and completion of the Rye and Denge-ness Railway and Pier; and for other purposes.
Stretford Gas Act 1877	40 & 41 Vict. c. clxxxii	2 August 1877
An Act to empower the Stretford Gas Company to enlarge their existing Works; to raise further Capital; and for other purposes.
Taff Vale Railway Act 1877	40 & 41 Vict. c. clxxxiii	2 August 1877
An Act to empower the Taff Vale Railway Company to raise additional Capital; and for other purposes.
City of Waterford Gas Act 1877	40 & 41 Vict. c. clxxxiv	2 August 1877
An Act to authorise the City of Waterford Gas Company to raise additional Capital; and for other purposes.
Whitland and Taf Vale (Cardigan Extension) Railway Act 1877	40 & 41 Vict. c. clxxxv	2 August 1877
An Act to authorise the Whitland and Taf Vale Railway Company to extend their Railway to Cardigan; and for other purposes.
Ashton Gas Act 1877	40 & 41 Vict. c. clxxxvi	2 August 1877
An Act to authorise the Ashton Gas Company to acquire further Lands; to extend their Works; to raise additional Capital; and for other purposes.
Birkenhead Tramways Act 1877 (repealed)	40 & 41 Vict. c. clxxxvii	2 August 1877
An Act for dissolving and re-incorporating the Birkenhead Street Railway Company, Limited, and for empowering them to lay down further Tramways; and for other purposes. (Repealed by County of Merseyside Act 1980 (c. x))
Bolton Improvement Act 1877	40 & 41 Vict. c. clxxxviii	2 August 1877
An Act to extend the Borough of Bolton, and to enable the Mayor, Aldermen, and Burgesses thereof to make New Streets and Street Improvements, to extend the Limits of Gas Supply, and to make further provision for the Improvement and Government of the Borough; and for other purposes.
Brighton and Dyke Railway Act 1877	40 & 41 Vict. c. clxxxix	2 August 1877
An Act for making a Railway between Brighton and the Dyke, in the County of Sussex; and for other purposes.
Dukinfield and Denton Local Boards (Gas) Act 1877	40 & 41 Vict. c. cxc	2 August 1877
An Act for empowering the Local Boards for the Districts of Dukinfield in the County of Chester, and Denton in the County of Lancaster, to make and supply Gas, and for carrying into effect an Agreement between them and the Dukinfield Gas Company for the Joint Purchase by them of that Company's Undertaking; and for other purposes.
Epsom and Ewell Gas Act 1877 (repealed)	40 & 41 Vict. c. cxci	2 August 1877
An Act for dissolving the Epsom and Ewell Gas Company, Limited; for re-incorporating the Proprietors therein with others, and for conferring Powers on the Company so to be incorporated; and for other purposes. (Repealed by Wandsworth, Wimbledon and Epsom District Gas Act 1912 (2 & 3 Geo. 5. c. xlvii))
Glasgow and Ibrox Tramway Act 1877	40 & 41 Vict. c. cxcii	2 August 1877
An Act to authorise the construction of Tramways from Glasgow to Ibrox; and for other purposes.
Greenock Police Act 1877 (repealed)	40 & 41 Vict. c. cxciii	2 August 1877
An Act to consolidate and amend the provisions relating to the Police of the Town of Greenock, and to authorise certain Improvements in the said Town; and for various other purposes. (Repealed by Greenock Corporation Act 1909 (9 Edw. 7. c. cxxix))
Lerwick Harbour Improvements Act 1877	40 & 41 Vict. c. cxciv	2 August 1877
An Act to constitute a body of Harbour Trustees for the management, maintenance, and regulation of the Port and Harbour of Lerwick; to authorise the construction of a new Pier and other works at Lerwick for the improvement of the said Harbour; and for other purposes.
Limehouse Subway Act 1877	40 & 41 Vict. c. cxcv	2 August 1877
An Act to incorporate a Company for making a Subway under the River Thames from Limehouse to Rotherhithe.
Londonderry Bridge Act 1877	40 & 41 Vict. c. cxcvi	2 August 1877
An Act for authorising the Discharge of the Debt of the Londonderry Bridge Commissioners by Loans secured on Rates in the City and County of Londonderry and the County of Tyrone; and for other purposes.
Penarth, Sully, and Barry Railway Act 1877	40 & 41 Vict. c. cxcvii	2 August 1877
An Act to incorporate a Company for the Construction of the Penarth, Sully, and Barry Railway; and for other purposes.
Wakefield Improvement Act 1877 (repealed)	40 & 41 Vict. c. cxcviii	2 August 1877
An Act to make provision for empowering the Corporation of the Borough of Wakefield, in the West Riding of the County of York, to acquire the Undertaking of the Wakefield Waterworks Company, to make new Streets, to erect a Town Hall and Municipal Buildings, and for extending the powers of the Corporation with respect to the Local Government and Improvement of the Borough, and the raising of moneys; and for other purposes. (Repealed by West Yorkshire Act 1980 (c. xiv))
Whitland, Cronware, and Pendine Railway Act 1877 (repealed)	40 & 41 Vict. c. cxcix	2 August 1877
An Act for making a Railway from the Great Western (South Wales) Railway at Whitland, in the County of Carmarthen, to Cronware and Pendine, in the same County; and for other purposes. (Repealed by Whitland, Cronware and Pendine Railway (Abandonment) Act 1892 (55 & 56 Vict. c. cxxvi))
General Police and Improvement (Scotland) Act 1862 Order Confirmation (Leith) Act 1877 (repealed)	40 & 41 Vict. c. cc	2 August 1877
An Act to confirm a Provisional Order under "The General Police and Improvement (Scotland) Act, 1862," relating to the Burgh of Leith. (Repealed by Edinburgh Boundaries Extension and Tramways Act 1920 (10 & 11 Geo. 5. c. lxxxvii))
Metropolitan Commons Supplemental Act 1877	40 & 41 Vict. c. cci	2 August 1877
An Act to confirm Schemes under the Metropolitan Commons Act, 1866, (Note: Metropolitan Commons Act 1866 (29 & 30 Vict. c. 122)) and the Metropolitan Commons Amendment Act, 1869, (Note: Metropolitan Commons Amendment Act 1869 (32 & 33 Vict. c. 107)) relating respectively to Ealing Commons, Clapham Common, and Bostall Heath Common.
Pier and Harbour Orders Confirmation Act 1877 (No. 2)	40 & 41 Vict. c. ccii	2 August 1877
An Act to confirm certain Provisional Orders made by the Board of Trade under The General Pier and Harbour Act, 1861, relating to Aberbrothwick and Skerries.
	Aberbrothwick Harbour Order 1877	
	Skerries Harbour Order 1877	
Norfolk Estuary Act 1877	40 & 41 Vict. c. cciii	6 August 1877
An Act to repeal "The Norfolk Estuary Act, 1857," (Note: Norfolk Estuary Act 1857 (20 & 21 Vict. c. cxlvi)) and to re-enact certain of the provisions thereof, with amendments.
Bignores (Dartford) Estate Act 1877	40 & 41 Vict. c. cciv	6 August 1877
An Act to make provision with respect to certain lands known as the Brent, at or near Dartford, in the county of Kent.
Regent's Canal and Dock (Abandonment) Act 1877 (repealed)	40 & 41 Vict. c. ccv	6 August 1877
An Act for the Abandonment of the Undertaking of the Regent's Canal and Dock Company; and for the Dissolution of that Company and the winding up of their affairs. (Repealed by Grand Union Canal Act 1943 (6 & 7 Geo. 6. c. v))
Bishop Auckland District Gas Act 1877	40 & 41 Vict. c. ccvi	6 August 1877
An Act for dissolving and re-incorporating the Bishop Auckland Gas Company, Limited, and granting powers for supplying with Gas the Parishes of Saint Andrew Auckland and Saint Helen Auckland and certain neighbouring Places in the county of Durham.
Margate Extension and Improvement Act 1877 (repealed)	40 & 41 Vict. c. ccvii	6 August 1877
An Act to extend the Borough of Margate in the Isle of Thanet and County of Kent, and to enable the Mayor, Aldermen, and Burgesses thereof to build a Sea Wall, to improve Streets, and to construct a New Road and other Works within the Borough, and to make further provisions for the improvement and good government thereof; and for other purposes. (Repealed by County of Kent Act 1981 (c. xviii))
Burslem Local Board Gas Act 1877 (repealed)	40 & 41 Vict. c. ccviii	6 August 1877
An Act to enable the Local Board of Health for the district of Burslem, in the county of Stafford, to acquire the undertaking of the Burslem and Tunstall Gas Company; and for other purposes. (Repealed by Stoke-on-Trent (Gas Consolidation) Act 1922 (12 & 13 Geo. 5. c. xxii))
Louth Gas Act 1877	40 & 41 Vict. c. ccix	6 August 1877
An Act for regulating and increasing the Capital of the Louth Gaslight Company; and for other purposes.
Dublin, Wicklow, and Wexford Railway Act 1877	40 & 41 Vict. c. ccx	6 August 1877
An Act to enable the Dublin, Wicklow, and Wexford Railway Company to construct a railway from their Ballywilliam branch to the town of New Ross, and other works; and conferring further powers on the Company with reference to their undertaking.
Abbotsbury Railway Act 1877	40 & 41 Vict. c. ccxi	6 August 1877
An Act for incorporating the Abbotsbury Railway Company; and for other purposes.
Whitehaven, Cleator, and Egremont Railway Act 1877	40 & 41 Vict. c. ccxii	6 August 1877
An Act to authorise the Whitehaven, Cleator, and Egremont Railway Company to make new Railways and other Works in the county of Cumberland; to raise further Capital; and for other purposes.
Birmingham and Lichfield Junction Railway Act 1877 (repealed)	40 & 41 Vict. c. ccxiii	10 August 1877
An Act to extend the Time limited for the compulsory purchase of Lands and completion of the Railways and Works authorised by "The Birmingham and Lichfield Junction Railway Act, 1872," (Note: Birmingham and Lichfield Junction Railway Act 1872 (35 & 36 Vict. c. clxxii)) "The Birmingham and Lichfield Junction Railway Act, 1874," and "The Birmingham and Lichfield Junction Railway Act, 1875;" (Note: Birmingham and Lichfield Junction Railway Act 1875 (38 & 39 Vict. c. lii)) and for other purposes. (Repealed by Statute Law (Repeals) Act 2013 (c. 2))
Burry Port and Gwendreath Valley Railway Act 1877	40 & 41 Vict. c. ccxiv	10 August 1877
An Act to extend the time granted to the Burry Port and Gwendreath Valley Railway Company for the completion of certain Railways and Works; and for other purposes.
Glencairn Railway (Revival of Powers) Act 1877 (repealed)	40 & 41 Vict. c. ccxv	10 August 1877
An Act to revive the powers and extend the periods for the compulsory purchase of Lands, and for the construction of the Railway authorised by the Glencairn Railway Act, 1872; (Note: Glencairn Railway Act 1872 (35 & 36 Vict. c. clxxvi)) and for other purposes. (Repealed by Glencairn Railway (Abandonment) Act 1881 (44 & 45 Vict. c. lxxix))
Ipswich Dock Act 1877	40 & 41 Vict. c. ccxvi	10 August 1877
An Act to confer further powers on the Ipswich Dock Commissioners.
Kent Waterworks Act 1877	40 & 41 Vict. c. ccxvii	10 August 1877
An Act for extending the limits of supply of the Kent Waterworks Company, and for authorising the Company to construct further Works and to raise further Money; and for other purposes.
Lewes and East Grinstead Railway Act 1877	40 & 41 Vict. c. ccxviii	10 August 1877
An Act for incorporating the Lewes and East Grinstead Railway Company; and for other purposes.
London Street Tramways (Caledonian Road Extension) Act 1877	40 & 41 Vict. c. ccxix	10 August 1877
An Act to authorise the London Street Tramways Company to construct additional tramways for connecting their tramway in Pentonville Road with the North Metropolitan Tramway in Holloway Road; and for other purposes.
Mersey Railway Act 1877	40 & 41 Vict. c. ccxx	10 August 1877
An Act to authorise an Extension of Time to the Mersey Railway Company for completing their Undertaking.
Southampton Street Tramways Act 1877	40 & 41 Vict. c. ccxxi	10 August 1877
An Act to authorise the construction of Tramways in and near Southampton; and for other purposes.
Tudhoe and Sunderland Bridge Gas Act 1877	40 & 41 Vict. c. ccxxii	10 August 1877
An Act for incorporating the Tudhoe and Sunderland Bridge Gas Company; and for other purposes.
Cornwall Minerals Railway Act 1877	40 & 41 Vict. c. ccxxiii	10 August 1877
An Act for conferring further powers on the Cornwall Minerals Railway Company in relation to their undertaking, and for authorising arrangements between them and the Great Western Railway Company; and for other purposes.
Brighton and London Sea Water Supply (Extension of Time) Act 1877	40 & 41 Vict. c. ccxxiv	10 August 1877
An Act to extend the time for the completion of the Works authorised by the Brighton and London Sea Water Supply Act, 1872. (Note: Brighton and London Sea Water Supply Act 1872 (35 & 36 Vict. c. clix))
Welshpool and Llanfair Railway Act 1877 (repealed)	40 & 41 Vict. c. ccxxv	10 August 1877
An Act to authorise the construction of a railway in the county of Montgomery from Welshpool to Llanfair; and for other purposes connected with the said railway. (Repealed by Welshpool and Llanfair Railway (Abandonment) Act 1882 (45 & 46 Vict. c. xli))
Belfast Central Railway (Extensions) Act 1877	40 & 41 Vict. c. ccxxvi	10 August 1877
An Act to authorise the Belfast Central Railway Company to construct a railway in the town of Belfast for connecting their railway with the railway or tramway of the Belfast Harbour Commissioners on Donegal Quay; and for other purposes.
Local Government Board's Provisional Orders Confirmation (Caistor Union, &c.) Act 1877	40 & 41 Vict. c. ccxxvii	10 August 1877
An Act to confirm certain Provisional Orders of the Local Government Board relating to the Rural Sanitary District of the Caistor Union, the Borough of Chesterfield, the Local Government Districts of Cleckheaton and Ebbw Vale, the Boroughs of Honiton and King's Lynn (two), the Rural Sanitary District of the Maldon Union, the Local Government Districts of New Sleaford, Redcar, and Sandown, the Town of Southampton (Poor Law), the Local Government Districts of Wallasey (two), Wallingfen, Wellingborough, and Ystradyfodwg.
	Caistor Union Order 1877	
	Chesterfield Order 1877	
	Cleckheaton Order 1877	
	Ebbw Vale Order 1877	
	Honiton Order 1877	
	King's Lynn Order (1) 1877	
	King's Lynn Order (2) 1877	
	Maldon Union Order 1877	
	New Sleaford Order 1877	
	Redcar Order 1877	
	Sandown Order 1877	
	Southampton Order 1877	
	Wallasey Order (1) 1877	
	Wallasey Order (2) 1877	
	Wallingfen Order 1877	
	Wellingborough Order 1877	
	Ystradyfodwg Order 1877	
St. Catherine's Harbour Transfer Act 1877	40 & 41 Vict. c. ccxxviii	10 August 1877
An Act to provide for transferring to the States of the Island of Jersey St. Catherine's Harbour Jersey, and certain land near it.
Local Government Board's Provisional Orders Confirmation (Joint Boards) Act 1877	40 & 41 Vict. c. ccxxix	10 August 1877
An Act to confirm certain Provisional Orders of the Local Government Board forming the Birmingham, Tame, and Rea Main Sewerage District, and the Lower Thames Valley Main Sewerage District, and constituting the Weymouth Port Sanitary Authority.
	Birmingham Tame and Rea Main Sewerage District Order 1877	
	Lower Thames Valley Main Sewerage District Order 1877	
	Port of Weymouth Order 1877	
Local Government Board's Provisional Orders Confirmation (Hyde, &c.) Act 1877	40 & 41 Vict. c. ccxxx	10 August 1877
An Act to confirm certain Provisional Orders of the Local Government Board relating to the Local Government District of Hyde and the Boroughs of Plymouth and Ryde.
	Hyde Order 1877	
	Plymouth Order 1877	
	Ryde Order 1877	
Dover and Deal Railway Act 1877	40 & 41 Vict. c. ccxxxi	14 August 1877
An Act to extend the periods respectively limited by "The Dover and Deal Railway Act, 1874," (Note: Dover and Deal Railway Act 1874 (37 & 38 Vict. c. lii)) for the compulsory purchase of Lands, and for the completion of the Works by that Act authorised.
Harrow and Rickmansworth Railway (Abandonment) Act 1877 (repealed)	40 & 41 Vict. c. ccxxxii	14 August 1877
An Act for the Abandonment of the Railway authorised by "The Harrow and Rickmansworth Railway Act, 1874;" (Note: Harrow and Rickmansworth Railway Act 1874 (37 & 38 Vict. c. clxxxvii)) and for other purposes. (Repealed by Statute Law (Repeals) Act 2013 (c. 2))
Metropolitan District Railway Act 1877	40 & 41 Vict. c. ccxxxiii	14 August 1877
An Act for conferring further powers on the Metropolitan District Railway Company; and for other purposes.
Dublin Science and Art Museum Act 1877	40 & 41 Vict. c. ccxxxiv	14 August 1877
An Act to authorise the Commissioners of Public Works in Ireland to acquire from the Royal Dublin Society and others Lands for the Erection of a Science and Art Museum in Dublin, and to establish a National Library in Dublin; and for other purposes.
Metropolitan Street Improvements Act 1877 (repealed)	40 & 41 Vict. c. ccxxxv	14 August 1877
An Act for enabling the Metropolitan Board of Works to make certain New Streets and Street Improvements within the Metropolis. (Repealed by Local Law (Greater London Council and Inner London Boroughs) Order 1965 (SI 1965/540))
Limerick Gas Act 1877	40 & 41 Vict. c. ccxxxvi	14 August 1877
An Act to dissolve the United General Gaslight Company, and to re-incorporate the members thereof with further powers for the supply of gas at Limerick.
Galway and Salthill Tramways Act 1877	40 & 41 Vict. c. ccxxxvii	14 August 1877
An Act to authorise the construction of Tramways in and near the county of the town of Galway; and for other purposes.
Cambrian Railways Act 1877	40 & 41 Vict. c. ccxxxviii	14 August 1877
An Act to authorise the Cambrian Railways Company to raise more money; and for other purposes.
London, Essex, and Kent Coast Junction Railway (Abandonment) Act 1877 (repealed)	40 & 41 Vict. c. ccxxxix	14 August 1877
An Act for the Abandonment of the London, Essex, and Kent Coast Junction Railway. (Repealed by Statute Law (Repeals) Act 2013 (c. 2))
Solway Salmon Fisheries Commissioners (Scotland) Act 1877 (repealed)	40 & 41 Vict. c. ccxl	14 August 1877
An Act to make certain provisions in regard to the Salmon Fisheries in the Solway Firth and its affluents. (Repealed by Salmon and Freshwater Fisheries (Consolidation) (Scotland) Act 2003 (asp 15))
Local Government Board's Provisional Orders Confirmation (Artizans and Labourers Dwellings) Act 1877	40 & 41 Vict. c. ccxli	14 August 1877
An Act to confirm certain Provisional Orders of the Local Government Board relating to the City of Norwich and the Boroughs of Walsall and Wolverhampton.
	Norwich Order 1877	
	Walsall Order 1877	
	Wolverhampton Order 1877	
Local Government Board's Provisional Orders Confirmation (Atherton, &c.) Act 1877	40 & 41 Vict. c. ccxlii	14 August 1877
An Act to confirm certain Provisional Orders of the Local Government Board relating to the Local Government Districts of Atherton, Barnard Castle, Belgrave, Brigg, Brownhills, Cwmdu, and Dawlish, the Borough of Evesham, the Improvement Act District of High and Low Harrogate, the Borough of Ipswich, the Local Government District of Newbold and Dunston, the Rural Sanitary District of the Settle Union, the Local Government Districts of Slough and Southborough, the Borough of Swansea, and the Rural Sanitary District of the Ulverstone Union.
	Atherton Order 1877	
	Barnard Castle Order 1877	
	Belgrave Order 1877	
	Brigg Order 1877	
	Brownhills Order 1877	
	Cwmdu Order 1877	
	Dawlish Order 1877	
	Evesham Order 1877	
	High and Low Harrogate Order 1877	
	Ipswich Order 1877	
	Newbold and Dunston Order 1877	
	Settle Union Order 1877	
	Slough Order 1877	
	Southborough Order 1877	
	Swansea Order 1877	
	Ulverstone Union Order 1877	

=== Private acts ===
Short title	Citation	Royal assent
Long title
Gregory Heirlooms Act 1877	40 & 41 Vict. c. 1 Pr.	12 July 1877
An Act to authorise the Sale of the Furniture, Tapestry, Plate, and other Chattels bequeathed by the Will of the late Gregory Gregory, Esquire, deceased, as Heirlooms, and to declare the Trusts of the Proceeds of such Sale; and for other purposes.
Walton-on-the-Hill Rectory Amendment Act 1877	40 & 41 Vict. c. 2 Pr.	23 July 1877
An Act to amend the Walton-on-the-Hill Rectory Act, 1843. (Note: Walton-on-the-Hill Rectory Act 1843 (6 & 7 Vict. c. 16 Pr.))
Brunskill Estate Act 1877	40 & 41 Vict. c. 3 Pr.	2 August 1877
An Act to provide for the management and repairs of the Estates devised by the Will of Stephen Brunskill; and for other purposes.
Earl of Carysfort's Estate Act 1877	40 & 41 Vict. c. 4 Pr.	2 August 1877
An Act for amending the Powers of Leasing contained in the Will of the Right Honourable Granville Leveson, Earl of Carysfort, deceased; and for other purposes.
Starkie Estate Act 1877	40 & 41 Vict. c. 5 Pr.	2 August 1877
An Act to extend the Powers of the Trustees of the Settled Estates of Le Gendre Nicholas Starkie for Purposes of Purchase, Sale, and Exchange; to appoint new Trustees with Power to raise Money for the Rebuilding of the Mansion, the making of Roads; and for other purposes.
Scarisbrick Estate Act 1877	40 & 41 Vict. c. 6 Pr.	2 August 1877
An Act to confer upon the Trustees of the Will and Codicil of the late Charles Scarisbrick, deceased, further powers of Leasing and powers of Partition and Sale and Exchange, and other powers for the Management and Improvement of the Estates subject to such Will and Codicil; and for other purposes.
Earl of Winchilsea and Nottingham's Estate Act 1877	40 & 41 Vict. c. 7 Pr.	6 August 1877
An Act for confirming and extending certain powers contained in the Resettlement, dated the twenty-fourth day of July one thousand eight hundred and seventy-four, of the Earl of Winchilsea's Estates, and for other purposes in relation thereto.
Walker Trust Act 1877	40 & 41 Vict. c. 8 Pr.	6 August 1877
An Act to incorporate the Trustees of the deceased Barbara Walker and Mary Walker, of Coates in the county of Midlothian, and to enable them to raise Money, and otherwise better to carry into effect the objects of the Trust.
Fleming's Estate Act 1877	40 & 41 Vict. c. 9 Pr.	10 August 1877
An Act to amend Fleming's Estate Act, 1852, (Note: Fleming's Estate Act 1852 (15 & 16 Vict. c. 19 Pr.)) and the Acts amending the same.
Chesterfield Estate (Nottingham Sewage) Act 1877	40 & 41 Vict. c. 10 Pr.	10 August 1877
An Act to authorise a Lease of Lands in the Parishes of Gedling and Burton Joyce, in the county of Nottingham, part of the Settled Estates of the Earl of Carnarvon, and of Lands in the same Parishes, part of the Glebe Land of the Rectory of Gedling aforesaid, to the Corporation of Nottingham.
Marquess of Anglesey's Estate Act 1877	40 & 41 Vict. c. 11 Pr.	14 August 1877
An Act to amend and extend "Marquess of Anglesey's Estate Act, 1867." (Note: Marquess of Anglesey's Estate Act 1867 (30 & 31 Vict. c. 4 Pr.))
Mackay's Naturalization Act 1877 (Note: This act was not printed by the Queen's Printer.)	40 & 41 Vict. c. 12 Pr.	17 May 1877
An Act to naturalize Donald James Mackay (styled in the Kingdom of the Netherlands Baron Mackay), and to grant to and confer upon him all the rights, privileges, and capacities of a natural-born Subject of Her Majesty the Queen.
De Virte's Naturalization Act 1877	40 & 41 Vict. c. 13 Pr.	11 June 1877
An Act to naturalize Jean Thomas Antoine Leopold de Virte (in the Kingdom of Italy styled Baron Jean Thomas Antoine Leopold de Virte de Rathsamhausen (Ehenweyer)), Margaret de Virte his wife, and Emma Maria Louisa Isabella de Virte their daughter, and to grant and confer on them all the rights, privileges, and capacities of natural-born Subjects of Her Majesty the Queen.
Robey and Chantrell's Patent Act 1877	40 & 41 Vict. c. 14 Pr.	2 August 1877
An Act for rendering valid certain Letters Patent granted to James Robey and George Frederick Chantrell for "A New or Improved Filtering and Deodorising Medium."
Beamish's Divorce Act 1877	40 & 41 Vict. c. 15 Pr.	14 August 1877
An Act to dissolve the Marriage of James Caulfield Beamish, Captain in Her Majesty's Royal Cork City Regiment of Militia Artillery, with Elizabeth Ivers Beamish his now Wife, and to enable him to marry again; and for other purposes.

=== Sources ===
- Chronological Table of the Statutes. 2009. Part 1. Pages 500 to 503.
- Chronological Table and Index of the Statutes, 13th Ed, 1896, vol 1, pp 486 to 490.
- Paterson (ed). The Practical Statutes of the Session 1877. Printed by Horace Cox. 1877. Google
- The Law Reports: The Public General Statutes, passed in . . . 1877. Printed for William Clowes and Sons, printers to the Incorporated Council of Law Reporting for England and Wales. 1877. Volume 12:
- The Public General Statutes. 1877.
- The Public General Acts of the United Kingdom of Great Britain and Ireland: passed in the Fortieth and Forty-First Years of . . . Victoria. Edward Bret Ince for the proprietors of the Law Journal Reports. 1877.
- The Public General Acts passed in the Fortieth and Forty-First Years of . . . Victoria. 1877.
- The Local Acts passed in the Fortieth and Forty-First Years of . . . Victoria. 1877. Google: . Front matter and chapters i to lxxv: Google.
- The Public General Statutes affecting Scotland, passed in the Fortieth and Forty-First Years of . . . Victoria. Printed by authority of William Blackwood and Sons. Edinburgh. 1877.
- "Reading of New Statutes" in "Magistrates' Law" (1877) 63 The Law Times 395, 406 and 424; (1877) 64 The Law Times 9
- (1877) 65 The Law Times 77, 181, 182, 333 and 411
- "Legislation and Jurisprudence" (1877) 63 The Law Times 13, 24, 42, 77, 95, 118, 153, 190, 208, 225, 243 and 262
- "Acts of the Session" in "Legal News" (1877) 63 The Law Times 107
- "Legislation" in "Legal News" (1877) 63 The Law Times 235
- The Law Times. Statutes of the United Kingdom. 40 & 41 Vict, A D 1877.
- "Statutes of the Last Session" (1877) 12 The Law Journal 662
- "New Statutes" (1877) 12 The Law Journal 523 and 607
- "The Fortieth Year of the Queen" (1877) 12 The Law Journal 89
- "Law in Parliament" (1877) 12 The Law Journal 105, 134, 163, 176, 224, 354 and 390
- "Work for Next Session" (1877) 12 The Law Journal 1
- (1877) 12 The Law Journal 114, 125, 168, 257, 268, 500 and 565
- "Private Bill Legislation" (1876) 11 The Law Journal 700
- "Legislation of the Year" (1877) 21 The Solicitors' Journal 883, 899, 911, 927 and 939
- "Legislation of the Week" (1877) 21 The Solicitors' Journal 286, 300, 325, 346, 363, 386, 405, 426, 461, 485, 504, 521, 544, 561, 580, 616, 636, 655, 676, 696, 738, 756 and 797
- "Private Bills in Parliament" (1877) 21 The Solicitors' Journal 95
- The Solicitors Journal. The Public General Statutes: 40 & 41 Victoriae, 1877.
- "Statutes of the past Session" (1877) 41 The Justice of the Peace 545 and 561
- "Statutes 40 Vict" (1877) 41 The Justice of the Peace 329, 361, 377 and 457
- "Statutes 40 & 41 Vict" (1877) 41 The Justice of the Peace 489, 523, 537, 552, 569, 601, 632, 648, 664, 713, 729 and 744
- "Legislative Intelligence" (1877) 41 The Justice of the Peace 94, 105, 111, 122, 127, 136, 143, 153, 159, 169, 175, 186, 191, 201, 223, 232, 239, 248, 255, 265, 271, 281, 287, 297, 303, 312, 319, 351, 360, 367, 376, 383, 393, 399, 408, 415, 425, 431, 441, 447, 456, 463, 473, 479, 488, 495, 504, 511 and 522
- (1877) 41 The Justice of the Peace 625 and 674
- "Statutes affecting Scotland, 1877" (1877) 21 The Journal of Jurisprudence 610 to 614
- "Statutes affecting Scotland". Oliver & Boyd's New Edinburgh Almanac and National Repository for the Year 1878. Pages 159 to 182.
- (1877) 11 Irish Law Times and Solicitors' Journal 301 and 362
- (1877) 11 Irish Law Times and Solicitors' Journal 74, 83, 85, 97, 104, 105, 123, 160, 168, 216, 263, 291, 477 and 624
- The Irish Law Times and Solicitors' Journal. Public General Statutes, 40° & 41° Victoriae (1877).
- John F Haynes. The Students' Statutes for 1877. Printed by Horace Cox. London. 1877.
- "Important Acts of Parliament: passed in . . . 1877". Cassell's Illustrated Almanack for 1878. p 34.
- "Private Bills in Parliament" (1877) 2 Medical Examiner 102 (8 February 1877)
- "Private Bills in Parliament" (1877) 17 The Architect 105 (17 February 1877)
- 32 The Building News 186
- "General List of Private Bills, Session, 1877" (1877) 43 The Engineer 97; and "Private Bills - Session 1877" at p 151.
- "Railway Bills in Parliament" (1877) 28 The Railway News 15, 34, 65, 111 and 130
- "Railway Bills" (1877) 39 Herapath's Railway (and Commercial) Journal (Quarto Series) 44, 100, 122, 183, 215, 247, 299, 348, 395, 418, 446, 531, 578, 603, 626, 650, 674 and 699.

== See also ==
- List of acts of the Parliament of the United Kingdom
