= Building Societies Act 1986 =

Act of the Parliament of the United Kingdom

Building Societies Act 1986 (Note: Section 125(1).)
- Act of Parliament
- Parliament of the United Kingdom
- Long title: An Act to make fresh provision with respect to building societies and further provision with respect to conveyancing services.
- Citation: 1986 c. 53
- Territorial extent: United Kingdom

Dates
- Royal assent: 25 July 1986
- Commencement: 25 September 1986: Part I (Note: Section 126(1).); Various (Note: The Building Societies Act 1986 (Commencement No. 1) Order 1986 (SI 1986/1560).)
Other legislation
Amends	See § Repealed enactments; Banking and Financial Dealings Act 1971
Repeals/revokes	See § Repealed enactments
Amended by	Banking Act 1987; Housing (Scotland) Act 1987; Building Societies (Limited Credit Facilities) Order 1987; Income and Corporation Taxes Act 1988; Building Societies (Commercial Assets and Services) Order 1988; Tribunals and Inquiries Act 1992; Deregulation and Contracting Out Act 1994; Deregulation (Building Societies) Order 1995; Building Societies Act 1997; Bank of England Act 1998; Financial Services and Markets Act 2000 (Mutual Societies) Order 2001; Land Registration Act 2002; Statute Law (Repeals) Act 2004; Mental Capacity Act 2005; Building Societies (Funding) and Mutual Societies (Transfers) Act 2007; Financial Services (Banking Reform) Act 2013; Financial Services Act 2012 (Mutual Societies) Order 2013; Co-operative and Community Benefit Societies Act 2014; Corporate Insolvency and Governance Act 2020; Building Societies Act 1986 (Amendment) Act 2024

Status: Amended

Text of statute as originally enacted

Revised text of statute as amended

Text of the Building Societies Act 1986 as in force today (including any amendments) within the United Kingdom, from legislation.gov.uk.

The Building Societies Act 1986 (c. 53) is an act of the Parliament of the United Kingdom governing building societies (mutually-owned mortgage-lending institutions). It removed certain restrictions on the range of services they could offer, so that they could compete with banks on a level basis: they could now make unsecured loans, offer cheque accounts, exchange currencies, provide stockbroking services, manage personal equity plans (tax-privileged investment accounts) and portfolios of unit trusts, arrange and advise on insurance, etc. A new regulatory agency, the Building Societies Commission, was set up to supervise the activities of the societies, which were allowed to de-mutualise and become public limited companies subject to the agreement of their depositors.

This act and the Big Bang stock market reform, also in the UK, also in 1986, were the two central planks of the move to financial deregulation in the United Kingdom in the 1980s. The Financial Services Act 1986 was also part of that movement.

== Provisions ==
=== Repealed enactments ===
Section 120(2) of the act repealed 22 enactments, listed in part I of schedule 19 to the act, revoked 1 instrument, listed in part II of schedule 19, and repealed and revoked 15 further enactments and instruments extending only to Northern Ireland, listed in part III of schedule 19 to the act.

Part I — Repeals: General
Citation	Short title	Extent of repeal
37 & 38 Vict. c. 42	Building Societies Act 1874	Section 1.
37 & 38 Vict. c. 42	Building Societies Act 1874	Section 4.
37 & 38 Vict. c. 42	Building Societies Act 1874	Section 32.
57 & 58 Vict. c. 47	Building Societies Act 1894	Section 8(1).
57 & 58 Vict. c. 47	Building Societies Act 1894	Section 29.
8 & 9 Eliz. 2. c. 64	Building Societies Act 1960	Section 72.
8 & 9 Eliz. 2. c. 64	Building Societies Act 1960	Section 73(1).
8 & 9 Eliz. 2. c. 64	Building Societies Act 1960	Section 77.
8 & 9 Eliz. 2. c. 64	Building Societies Act 1960	In Schedule 5, the entry relating to paragraph 4 of section 32 of the Building Societies Act 1874.
9 & 10 Eliz. 2. c. 62	Trustee Investments Act 1961	In Part IV of Schedule 1, paragraphs 3A and 7.
10 & 11 Eliz. 2. c. 37	Building Societies Act 1962	The whole act.
1965 c. 32	Administration of Estates (Small Payments) Act 1965	In Schedules 1 and 3, the entries relating to the Building Societies Act 1962.
1969 c. 46	Family Law Reform Act 1969	In Schedule 1, the entry relating to the Building Societies Act 1962.
1970 c. 10	Income and Corporation Taxes Act 1970	In section 343(5), the words " union or ".
1974 c. 39	Consumer Credit Act 1974	In section 16, in subsection (1) the words " or building society," and, in subsections (1)(e) and (3)(c), the word " or".
1974 c. 46	Friendly Societies Act 1974	In Schedule 10, paragraph 9.
1974 c. 47	Solicitors Act 1974	In section 32, in subsections (1) and (2), the word " banks' ".
1974 c. 49	Insurance Companies Act 1974	In Schedule 1, the entries relating to the Building Societies Act 1962.
1978 c. 27	Home Purchase Assistance and Housing Corporation Guarantee Act 1978	In section 3, subsections (2) to (4).
1979 c. 37	Banking Act 1979	In paragraph 6 of Schedule 1, the words from " within " to the end.
1979 c. 37	Banking Act 1979	In Schedule 6, paragraphs 6, 7, 16, and 17.
1982 c. 50	Insurance Companies Act 1982	In Schedule 5, paragraphs 3 and 5.
1984 c. 28	County Courts Act 1984	In Schedule 2, paragraph 26.
1985 c. 9	Companies Consolidation (Consequential Provisions) Act 1985	In Schedule 2, the entries relating to the Building Societies Act 1962.
1985 c. 58	Trustee Savings Banks Act 1985	In Schedule 1, paragraph 11(2)(a) and so much of that sub-paragraph as relates to the section 59 specified therein.
1985 c. 61	Administration of Justice Act 1985	Section 66.
1985 c. 68	Housing Act 1985	In section 458, the definition of "designated building society".
1985 c. 68	Housing Act 1985	In section 459, the entry relating to "designated building society".
1985 c. 69	Housing Associations Act 1985	Sections 63 to 66.
1985 c. 69	Housing Associations Act 1985	In section 72, the definitions of " building society ", " Chief Registrar " and " officer ".
1985 c. 69	Housing Associations Act 1985	In section 73, the entries relating to " building society ", " Chief Registrar " and " officer ".
1985 c. 71	Housing (Consequential Provisions) Act 1985	In Schedule 2, paragraphs 5 and 6.

Part II — Revocation Extending to Great Britain
Citation	Title	Extent of revocation
SI 1981/1488	Building Societies (Authorisation) Regulations 1981	The whole Regulations.

Part III — Repeals and Revocations Extending Only to Northern Ireland
Citation	Short title	Extent of repeal or revocation
1967 c. 5 (N.I.)	Administration of Estates (Small Payments) Act (Northern Ireland) 1967	In Schedule 1, the entry relating to the Building Societies Act 1874.
1967 c. 31 (N.I.)	Building Societies Act (Northern Ireland) 1967	The whole act.
1969 c. 24 (N.I.)	Industrial and Provident Societies Act (Northern Ireland) 1969	In section 101(1), the definition of " Building Societies Acts ".
1969 c. 28 (N.I.)	Age of Majority Act (Northern Ireland) 1969	In Schedule 1, the entry relating to the Building Societies Act (Northern Ireland) 1967.
1969 c. 31 (N.I.)	Age of Majority Act (Northern Ireland) 1969	In Part I of Schedule 1, the entry relating to the Building Societies Act (Northern Ireland) 1967.
1970 c. 18 (N.I.)	Land Registration Act (Northern Ireland) 1970	In Schedule 12 the entry relating to the Building Societies Act (Northern Ireland) 1967.
1978 c. 23	Judicature (Northern Ireland) Act 1978	In Schedule 5, in Part II the entry relating to the Building Societies Act (Northern Ireland) 1967.
SI 1979/1573 (N.I. 12)	Statutory Rules (Northern Ireland) Order 1979	In Schedule 4 the entry relating to the Building Societies Act (Northern Ireland) 1967.
1980 c. 25	Insurance Companies Act 1980	In Schedule 3, paragraph 3.
SI 1981/156 (N.I. 3)	Housing (Northern Ireland) Order 1981	Article 156(6).
SI 1981/156 (N.I. 3)	Housing (Northern Ireland) Order 1981	In Part II of Schedule 2, the entry relating to the Building Societies Act (Northern Ireland) 1967.
S.R. 1982/155 (N.I.)	Building Societies (Authorisation) Regulations (Northern Ireland) 1982	The whole Regulations.
SI 1983/776 (N.I. 9)	Property (Discharge of Mortgage by Receipt) (Northern Ireland) Order 1983	In Article 3(10), in the definition of " mortgage " the words " section 37 of the Building Societies Act (Northern Ireland) 1967 ".
SI 1983/1118 (N.I. 15)	Housing (Northern Ireland) Order 1983	In Schedule 10, the entry relating to the Building Societies Act (Northern Ireland) 1967.
1985 c. 71	Housing (Consequential Provisions) Act 1985	In Schedule 2, paragraphs 13, 51(2) and 51(5)(a).
SI 1986/1035 (N.I. 9)	Companies Consolidation (Consequential Provisions) (Northern Ireland) Order 1986	In Part I of Schedule 1, the entry relating to the Building Societies Act (Northern Ireland) 1967.

== Amendments ==
=== Building Societies Act 1986 (Amendment) Act 2024 ===
Building Societies Act 1986 (Amendment) Act 2024 (Note: Section 4(4).)
- Act of Parliament
- Parliament of the United Kingdom
- Long title: An Act to make provision about the funding of building societies and the assimilation of the law relating to companies and the law relating to building societies.
- Citation: 2024 c. 18
- Introduced by: Julie Elliott MP (Commons); Lord Kennedy of Southwark (Lords)
- Territorial extent: England and Wales; Scotland; Northern Ireland; (Note: Section 4(1).)

Dates
- Royal assent: 24 May 2024
- Commencement: 24 July 2024 (Note: Section 4(2).)
Other legislation
Amends	Building Societies Act 1986

Status: Current legislation

History of passage through Parliament

Text of statute as originally enacted

Revised text of statute as amended

Under the Building Societies Act 1986, building societies would have had to raise at least 50% of funds, with some qualifications, from customer savings. The Building Societies Act 1986 (Amendment) Act 2024 (c. 18) would amend this to exclude some types of funding held for liquidity purposes or accessed in stress scenarios, from this calculation. The Building Societies Act 1986 (Amendment) Act 2024 also amends the act to allow for meetings to be held through electronic means.

== See also ==
- Building Societies Act
