= Charter Court Financial Services =

British financial services company

Charter Court Financial Services Group plc
- Type: Public
- Industry: Finance
- Founded: 2008
- Headquarters: Wolverhampton, England
- Key people: David Weymouth (Chairman); Andy Golding (CEO); April Talintyre (CFO)
- Products: Financial services
- Revenue: £224.9 million (2018)
- Operating income: £158.2 million (2018)
- Net income: £120.8 million (2018)
- Website: www.osb.co.uk

Charter Court Financial Services Group plc (Charter Court) is a financial services company operating in the United Kingdom, which provides retail savings products, specialist mortgage products, mortgage administration services and credit analysis. Charter Court operates via three separate specialist brands: Charter Savings Bank for retail savings, Precise Mortgages for specialist mortgages and Exact Mortgage Experts for credit analysis and servicing of existing mortgage portfolios.

Charter Court is authorised by the Prudential Regulation Authority (PRA) and regulated by the PRA and the Financial Conduct Authority in the United Kingdom. It was listed on the London Stock Exchange and was a constituent of the FTSE 250 Index until it was acquired by OneSavings Bank in October 2019.

== History ==
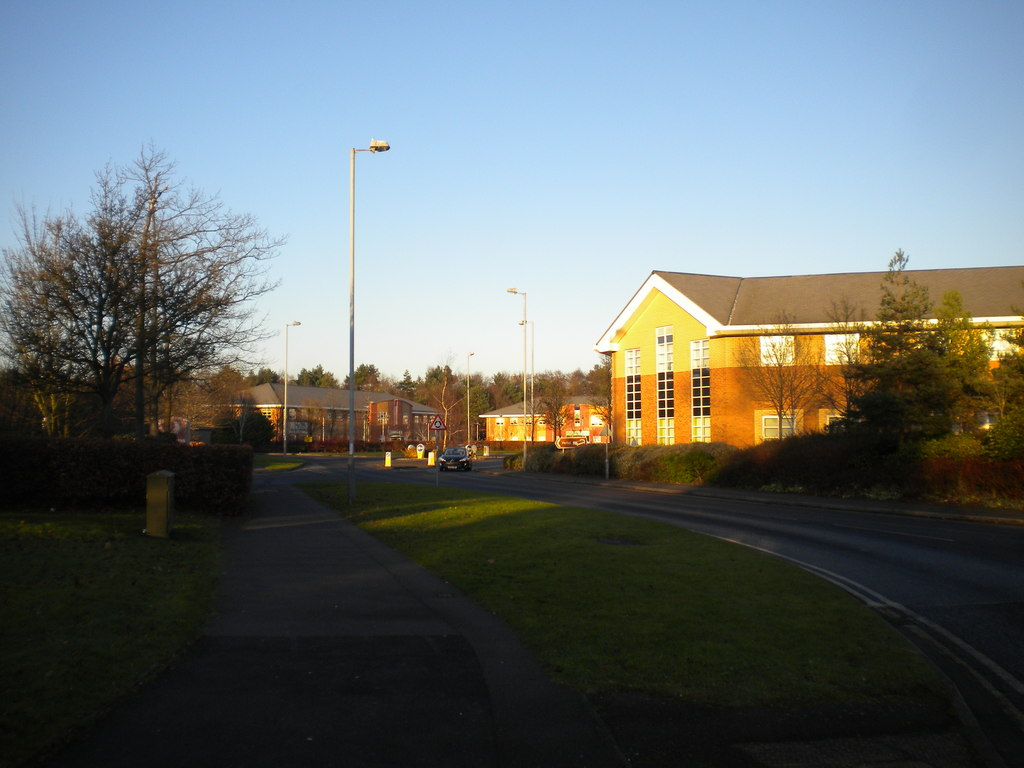
Charter Court in Wolverhampton (on the left)

The company was established with long term investment provided by Elliott Associates LP and Elliott International LP, to provide credit consultancy and mortgage administration services for pools of mortgage loans owned by third parties in 2008.

In 2009, after working for nearly a year on building and testing its mortgage origination and servicing platforms, Charter Court obtained permission from the Financial Services Authority (now Financial Conduct Authority) to act as an authorised mortgage administrator. Charter Court was granted permission by the Financial Services Authority (now Financial Conduct Authority) to act as an authorised mortgage lender in October 2010.

In January 2015, Charter Court obtained its banking licence from the Prudential Regulatory Authority, putting it among the first new banks in the UK to be granted a licence since the 2008 financial crisis. This was followed in March 2015 by the launch of Charter Savings Bank as an online retail savings bank.

In September 2017 Charter Court successfully conducted an initial public offering and on 4 October 2017 obtained a premium listing on the Main Market of the London Stock Exchange.

In March 2019 it was announced that Charter Court and OneSavings Bank would merge. The transaction was completed in October 2019.

== Operations ==
=== Charter Savings Bank ===
Charter Savings Bank is an online retail bank which provides savings products to UK customers. The Bank does not operate any branches. All applications can be submitted online (24/7) and customers are supported by a UK based call centre 7 days a week. The Bank launched in 2015 and provides fixed rate bonds, notice accounts, easy access accounts and cash ISAs. Eligible deposits with the Bank are protected by the Financial Services Compensation Scheme, the United Kingdom's deposit protection scheme, for savings up to the value of £85,000.

=== Precise Mortgages ===
Precise Mortgages offers residential and buy to let mortgages, along with bridging and second charge loans through a nationwide intermediary network. Precise Mortgages operates via a technology driven underwriting and credit risk management system, which is available 24/7.

=== Exact Mortgage Experts ===
Exact Mortgage Experts is a Fitch-rated mortgage servicer, administering mortgages originated by Precise Mortgages and selected third parties. It offers portfolio trading pricing, specialist analytics and credit consultancy to institutional clients. In April 2015 Fitch upgraded Exact's Special Servicer Rating to RSS2, while in September 2016 Exact's Primary Servicer rating was upgraded to RPS2.

== Authorisations and licences ==
Notable authorisations and licences since launch include:

- 2009: Charter Court was authorised for administering regulated mortgage contracts.
- 2010: The Group launched its specialist lender Precise Mortgages, initially for Buy-to-Let lending in May and was subsequently authorised for lending in relation to regulated mortgage contracts.
- 2013: Fitch Ratings assigned Charter Court a UK Primary Servicer Ratings of RPS3+ and upgraded the existing UK Special Servicer Rating to RSS2-.
- 2015: The PRA approved its application to vary its permissions to accept retail deposits through its consumer-facing retail brand Charter Savings Bank. Charter Court's special servicer rating of RSS2 was maintained by Fitch, while its Primary Servicer rating was upgraded to RPS2-.
- 2016: Fitch upgraded the Primary Servicer rating to RPS2.
