= Building Societies Act 1962 =

Act of the Parliament of the United Kingdom

Building Societies Act 1962 (Note: Section 135(1).)
- Act of Parliament
- Parliament of the United Kingdom
- Long title: An Act to consolidate (with corrections and improvements made under the Consolidation of Enactments (Procedure) Act, 1949) the Building Societies Acts, 1874 to 1960, and certain related enactments, except certain provisions of those Acts relating to the winding up of building societies and provisions relating to unincorporated societies.
- Citation: 10 & 11 Eliz. 2. c. 37
- Territorial extent: England and Wales; Scotland; (Note: Section 134(1).)

Dates
- Royal assent: 19 July 1962
- Commencement: 1 October 1962 (Note: Section 135(2).)
- Repealed: 1 January 1987
Other legislation
| Amends | See § Repealed enactments |
| Repeals/revokes | See § Repealed enactments |
| Amended by | Family Law Reform Act 1969; Statute Law (Repeals) Act 1969; Statute Law (Repeals) Act 1974; Law Reform (Miscellaneous Provisions) (Scotland) Act 1985 |
| Repealed by | Building Societies Act 1986 |

Status: Repealed

Text of statute as originally enacted

The Building Societies Act 1962 (10 & 11 Eliz. 2. c. 37) was an act of the Parliament of the United Kingdom that consolidated enactments related to building societies in Great Britain.

== Provisions ==
=== Repealed enactments ===
Section 131 of the Act repealed 10 enactments and revoked 2 orders, listed in parts I and II respectively of the tenth schedule to the act.

Part I - enactments repealed
| Citation | Short title | Extent of repeal |
|---|---|---|
| 37 & 38 Vict. c. 42 | Building Societies Act 1874 | The whole act except sections one, four and seven, and, in section thirty-two, the words "A society under this Act may terminate or be dissolved" and paragraph 4. |
| 38 & 39 Vict. c. 9 | Building Societies Act 1875 | The whole act. |
| 40 & 41 Vict. c. 63 | Building Societies Act 1877 | The whole act. |
| 47 & 48 Vict. c. 41 | Building Societies Act 1884 | The whole act. |
| 57 & 58 Vict. c. 47 | Building Societies Act 1894 | The whole act except sections eight and twenty-nine. |
| 59 & 60 Vict. c. 25 | Friendly Societies Act 1896 | In section two, paragraph (6) of subsection (1). In section four, paragraph (6) of subsection (1). |
| 2 & 3 Geo. 6. c. 55 | Building Societies Act 1939 | The whole act. |
| 3 & 4 Geo. 6. c. 19 | Societies (Miscellaneous Provisions) Act 1940 | Section five. |
| 8 & 9 Eliz. 2. c. 64 | Building Societies Act 1960 | The whole act except sections sixty-three, seventy-two and seventy-five, the definition of "member" in subsection (1) of section seventy-three, section seventy-seven, and, in the Fifth Schedule, the entries relating to the Friendly Societies Act, 1829, and to section thirty-two of the Building Societies Act, 1874. |
| 9 & 10 Eliz. 2. c. 62 | Trustee Investments Act 1961 | Paragraph 2 of the Fourth Schedule. |

Part II - Orders revoked
| Citation | Short title | Extent of repeal |
|---|---|---|
| SI 1961/1183 | Building Societies (Additional Security) Order 1961 | The whole order. |
| SI 1961/2245 | Building Societies (Additional Security) (No. 2) Order 1961 | The whole order. |

== Subsequent developments ==
Section 131 of, and schedule 10 to, the act were repealed by section 1 of, and part XI of the schedule to, the Statute Law (Repeals) Act 1974, which came into force on 27 June 1974.

Most of the act was repealed by section 120(2) of, and schedule 19 to, the Building Societies Act 1986, which came into force on 1 January 1987. The remainder of the act, including Part VII (dissolution and winding up of building societies), was repealed on 1 January 1988.
