= Kent Reliance =

Banking services provider

OneSavings Bank plc trading as Kent Reliance
- Traded as: LSE: OSB; FTSE 250 component
- Industry: Banking and financial services
- Founded: 1898 (as Chatham & District Reliance Building Society); 1986 (as Kent Reliance Building Society); 2011 (trading as OneSavings Bank plc)
- Headquarters: Chatham, Kent, United Kingdom
- Key people: David Weymouth (Chairman); Enrique Alvarez Labiano (CEO)
- Products: Buy to let mortgages, commercial mortgages, residential mortgages development finance, secured loans, retail savings
- Revenue: ▲£679.4 million (2025)
- Operating income: ▼£382.5 million (2025)
- Net income: ▼£285.7 million (2025)
- Parent: Kent Reliance Provident Society (59.9% share)
- Website: www.kentreliance.co.uk

OneSavings Bank plc (trading as Kent Reliance) is a British banking services provider based in Kent, England. It was founded in 1898 as the Chatham & District Reliance Building Society, changing its name to the Kent Reliance Building Society in 1986 following the merger with the Herne Bay Building Society.

On 1 February 2011, Kent Reliance Building Society transferred its business to a new bank, OneSavings Bank plc, following the purchase of a stake in its business by private equity firm JC Flowers.

OneSavings Bank plc's parent undertaking, OSB Group plc, is listed on the London Stock Exchange and is a constituent of the FTSE 250 Index. It is a specialist lending and retail savings group authorised by the Prudential Regulation Authority, part of the Bank of England, and regulated by the Financial Conduct Authority and Prudential Regulation Authority. It operates through specialist brokers and independent financial advisors in sub-sectors of the lending market. These sub-sectors include Residential Mortgages (comprising first charge, second charge and shared ownership), Buy to let/SME and Personal Loans. The bank is predominantly funded by retail savings originating from the Kent Reliance franchise.

== History ==
=== Chatham & District Building Society ===
The Chatham & District Reliance was formed in 1898 by “12 prosperous local businessmen”, led by Booth Hearn, a solicitor. Despite the absence of the word in its name, it was created as a terminating society and it was not until 1913 that it converted to a permanent society under the name of Chatham & District Reliance Permanent. It remained small and localized and did not have its first dedicated office until 1926. Its name was shortened to Chatham Reliance in 1953.

In the 1920s, the Society's policy was to expand through the use of agencies rather than branches and by 1928 it had agencies in 12 towns, mainly in north Kent but up as far as Lewisham and Penge in south London. By 1933, when it opened its first purpose-built office, assets exceeded £1/2m from more than 3,000 investors. By the early 1960s, assets had reached £3m, still very small given inflation and the growth of owner occupation. Branches were opened within Chatham in 1963 and in neighbouring Gillingham the following year. There was even an opportunistic branch in Spalding, Lincolnshire but there is no evidence of that lasting long. The fifth branch, at Rainham, was opened in 1971. In 1977, the Society acquired the much smaller Dover District Building Society adding a little over £1m to assets.

There was increasing concern over larger societies “inducing” the Society's agents to move and there was an attempt to find mergers with other local building societies. This proved unsuccessful and the Chatham continued to grow organically until by 1980 its assets exceeded £50m from 35,000 investors; it claimed to be the 67th largest society out of 273. In 1984 it acquired the small Kent & Canterbury adding £2m assets to a group total that had then reached £75m. Two years later came the more substantial merger with the Herne Bay Building Society. Comparative figures were not given in the Firth history; Chatham was described as much larger but the inclusion of Herne Bay took the total assets to £120m with 12 branches. In recognition of the importance of Herne Bay, the enlarged Society was renamed the Kent Reliance Building Society. (There is no connection between this Kent Reliance, which was formed by amalgamation in 1986 and the original Kent Reliance, which transferred engagements to the Alliance Building Society in 1948.) By the end of the 1980s property boom, assets had reached £200m and investors totalled 50,000. The ensuing recession led the Society to re-emphasise its agencies strategy and by the mid-1990s there were 20 agencies complementing its 12 branches. By 1998, the Society's centenary year, and the end of the official history, assets had reached £250m and Kent Reliance ranked 38 out of 79 building societies.

KRBS was the fastest growing building society in the UK between 2003 and 2008 and was a member of the Building Societies Association. The dramatic growth of KRBS was driven in part by the establishment in 2002 of a wholly owned subsidiary, Jersey Home Loans Limited, to buy the Jersey mortgage business of Standard Chartered Grindlays Bank Ltd. By September 2008, this subsidiary had mortgages on its books of over £700 million.

=== Transfer to OneSavings ===
Logo of OneSavings Bank

In July 2010, JC Flowers announced its intention to purchase a stake of Kent Reliance, forming OneSavings plc. The transfer of the business of the society to OneSavings was approved by a majority of members in November 2010. Kent Reliance Building Society converted into a provident society, Kent Reliance Provident Society, which owns a 59.9% stake in OneSavings Bank, with JC Flowers owning the remaining 40.1%. The transfer became effective on 1 February 2011 and OneSavings plc was renamed OneSavings Bank plc.

=== Recent years ===
In August 2012, the company acquired InterBay Commercial, a specialist commercial and buy to let mortgage lender, established in 2006. In September 2012, the company acquired Prestige Finance, a specialist provider of secured loans.

In April 2014, the company established Heritable Development Finance, a joint venture with Heritable Capital, formed to provide financing predominantly for residential property developments for experienced property developers.

OneSavings Bank was the subject of an initial public offering in May 2014.

In December 2015, the company established Rochester Mortgages to acquire the mortgage book of a subsidiary of Deutsche Bank.

In March 2019, it was announced that the company would merge with Charter Court Financial Services. The £1.6bn deal was set to close in October 2019.

In March 2021, the company announced that it had identified potential fraudulent activity by one of its borrowers with the maximum potential loss from the incident estimated at £28.6 million. It stated that its results announcement would have to be delayed while an investigation was carried out by Smith & Williamson.

In November 2023, OneSavings Bank entered into a strategic partnership with nCino to create a single cloud platform that optimizes traditional banking processes (underwriting, mortgage, loan origination).

== Operations ==
KRBS was notable as the only member of the UK building society sector to have offshored administrative work to India, via its wholly owned subsidiaries, Easiprocess and EasiOption (now known as OSBI). The KRBS Group employed significantly more staff in India than it did in the UK.

Its operations include "Kent Reliance for Intermediaries" which offers loans for residential properties and "Precise Mortgages" which offers loans for new new build customers.

OneSavings Bank is made up of a number of specialist financial services businesses, each serving a distinct audience and need:

- Kent Reliance (KRBS, Kent Reliance Banking Services)
- Kent Reliance for Intermediaries
- Precise Mortgages
- InterBay Commercial
- Prestige Finance
- Heritable Development Finance
- InterBay Asset Finance
- Charter Mortgages
- Charter Savings Bank
- OSBIndia
- Exact Mortgage Experts

== Sponsorship ==
OneSavings Bank charity partners include Great Ormond Street Hospital, and the KM Charity Team. OneSavings Bank is a sponsor of the Kent County Football Association.
