= Building Societies Act 1874 =

Act of the Parliament of the United Kingdom

Building Societies Act 1874 (Note: Section 1.)
- Act of Parliament
- Parliament of the United Kingdom
- Long title: An Act to consolidate and amend the Laws relating to Building Societies.
- Citation: 37 & 38 Vict. c. 42
- Introduced by: Sir Charles Russell, 3rd Baronet MP (Commons)
- Territorial extent: United Kingdom

Dates
- Royal assent: 30 July 1874
- Commencement: 2 November 1874 (Note: Section 2.)
Other legislation
Amends	See § Repealed enactments
Repeals/revokes	See § Repealed enactments
Amended by	Building Societies Act 1875; Building Societies Act 1894; Statute Law Revision Act 1950; Building Societies Act 1962; Statute Law (Repeals) Act 1969; Building Societies Act 1986
Relates to	Building Societies Act 1894

Status: Partially repealed

History of passage through Parliament

Records of Parliamentary debate relating to the statute from Hansard

Text of statute as originally enacted

The Building Societies Act 1874 (37 & 38 Vict. c. 42) is an act of the Parliament of the United Kingdom that consolidated and amended statutes relating to building societies.

== Passage ==
Leave to bring in the Building Societies Bill to the House of Commons was granted to William McCullagh Torrens MP, Spencer Horatio Walpole MP, Edward Temperley Gourley MP, Sir Gabriel Goldney, Joseph Dodds MP and Sir Charles Russell, 3rd Baronet MP on 30 March 1874. The bill had its first reading in the House of Commons on X, presented by MP. The bill had its second reading in the House of Commons on 28 March 1874 and was committed to a select committee, which reported on 15 May 1874, with amendments. The amended bill was re-committed to a committee of the whole house, which met and reported on 4 June 1874, with amendments. The amended bill was re-committed to a committee of the whole house, which met on 10 June 1874 and 11 June 1874 and reported on 16 June 1874, with amendments. The amended bill had its third reading in the House of Commons on 20 June 1874 and passed, without amendments.

The bill had its first reading in the House of Lords on 22 June 1874. The bill had its second reading in the House of Lords on 6 July 1874 and was committed to a committee of the whole house, which met on 9 July and 16 July 1874 and reported on 16 July 1874, with amendments. The amended bill had its third reading in the House of Lords on 17 July 1874 and passed, with amendments.

The amended bill was considered and agreed to by the House of Commons on 22 July 1874.

The bill was granted royal assent on 30 July 1874.

== Provisions ==
Section 7 of the act repealed the Benefit Building Societies Act 1836 (6 & 7 Will. 3. c. 32), but provided that this would not affect any societies incorporated or acts done under that act before repeal.

Section 8 of the act provided that every society incorporated under the Benefit Building Societies Act 1836 (6 & 7 Will. 3. c. 32) may be able to obtain a certificate of incorporation under the act, unless otherwise provided.

== Subsequent developments ==
The act was described as a Consolidation Act.

Paragraphs 2 and 4 of section 16 and parts of section 43 of the act were repealed by the Building Societies Act 1894 (57 & 58 Vict. c. 47), which came into force on 1 January 1895.

Section 2 of the act was repealed by section 1(1) of, and the first schedule to, the Statute Law Revision Act 1950 (14 Geo. 6. c. 6), which came into force on 23 May 1950.

The whole act except sections 1, 4 and 7, and, in section 32, the words "A society under this Act may terminate or be dissolved" and paragraph 4, was repealed by section 131 of, and the tenth schedule to, the Building Societies Act 1962 (10 & 11 Eliz. 2. c. 37).

Section 7 of the act was repealed by section 1 of, and part VII of the schedule to, the Statute Law (Repeals) Act 1969, which came into force on 1 January 1970.
