= Kent Reliance Provident Society =

2011–2022 UK industrial and provident society

- Company type: Mutual
- Industry: Financial services
- Founded: 2011
- Headquarters: Chatham, Kent, United Kingdom
- Key people: Malcom McCaig
- Subsidiaries: OneSavings Bank plc (59.9% share)
- Website: www.krps.com

Kent Reliance Provident Society (KRPS) was an industrial and provident society in the United Kingdom, formed as part of the transfer in 2011 of Kent Reliance Building Society's business to OneSavings Bank plc (OSB).

The membership of the former building society was transferred to KRPS while OSB, trading as Kent Reliance, krbs and Kent Reliance Banking Services, continued the banking activities.

OSB subsequently combined with Charter Court Financial Services in 2020 to form OSB Group.

Due to the fact that the Society had evolved significantly from its original conception, at the Annual General Meeting on 26 July 2022 the members agreed a proposal to wind up the Society. Its assets to be transferred into a new charity, the ‘Kent Reliance Community Foundation Limited’.

As a result of this decision it is no longer possible to apply to become a member of KRPS.
