= Commons Act =

Stock short title used for UK legislation

Commons Act is a stock short title used in the United Kingdom for legislation relating to commons.

== List ==
Acts of the Parliament of England

- The Commons Act 1236 (20 Hen. 3. c. 4)
- The Commons Act 1285 (13 Edw. 1. c. 46)

Acts of the Parliament of the United Kingdom

- The Commons Act 1876 (39 & 40 Vict. c. 56)
- The Commons (Expenses) Act 1878 (41 & 42 Vict. c. 56)
- The Commons Act 1879 (42 & 43 Vict. c. 47)
- The Law of Commons Amendment Act 1893 (56 & 57 Vict. c. 57)
- The Commons Act 1899 (62 & 63 Vict. c. 30)
- The Commons Act 1908 (8 Edw. 7. c. 44)
- The Commons Registration Act 1965 (c. 64)
- The Commons Act 2006 (c. 26)

The Metropolitan Commons Acts 1866 to 1878 is the collective title of the following acts:

- The Metropolitan Commons Act 1866 (29 & 30 Vict. c. 122)
- The Metropolitan Commons Amendment Act 1869 (32 & 33 Vict. c. 107)
- The Metropolitan Commons Act 1878 (41 & 42 Vict. c. 71)

== See also ==
- List of short titles
