= Metropolitan Commons Act 1866 =

Act of the Parliament of the United Kingdom

Metropolitan Commons Act 1866 (Note: Section 1.)
- Act of Parliament
- Parliament of the United Kingdom
- Long title: An Act to make Provision for the Improvement, Protection, and Management of Commons near the Metropolis.
- Citation: 29 & 30 Vict. c. 122
- Introduced by: Henry Cowper
- Territorial extent: United Kingdom

Dates
- Royal assent: 10 August 1866
- Commencement: 10 August 1866 (Note: The Acts of Parliament (Commencement) Act 1793.)
Other legislation
Amended by	Metropolitan Commons Amendment Act 1869; London Government Act 1939; Charities Act 1960; Commons Act 2006

Status: Amended

Text of statute as originally enacted

Revised text of statute as amended

Text of the Metropolitan Commons Act 1866 as in force today (including any amendments) within the United Kingdom, from legislation.gov.uk.

The Metropolitan Commons Act 1866 (29 & 30 Vict. c. 122) is an act of the Parliament of the United Kingdom that allowed local authorities within the area of the Metropolitan Police District around London, England to use income from rates to protect and maintain common lands in their areas.

It is one of the Metropolitan Commons Acts 1866 to 1878.

== Subsequent developments ==
Metropolitan Commons Amendment Act 1869
- Act of Parliament
- Parliament of the United Kingdom
- Long title: An Act to amend the Metropolitan Commons Act, 1866.
- Citation: 32 & 33 Vict. c. 107
- Territorial extent: United Kingdom

Dates
- Royal assent: 11 August 1869
- Commencement: 11 August 1869
Other legislation
Amends	Metropolitan Commons Act 1866
Amended by	Metropolitan Commons Act 1878

Status: Current legislation

Text of statute as originally enacted

Revised text of statute as amended

Text of the Metropolitan Commons Amendment Act 1869 as in force today (including any amendments) within the United Kingdom, from legislation.gov.uk.

The act was amended by the Metropolitan Commons Amendment Act 1869 (32 & 33 Vict. c. 107).

== Bibliography ==
- Halsbury's Statutes of England. (The Complete Statutes of England). Butterworth & Co (Publishers) Ltd. London. 1929. Volume 2. Page 567. Google Books.
- The Statutes of Practical Utility. Arranged in Alphabetical and Chronological Order with Notes and Indexes. Being the Fifth Edition of "Chitty's Statutes". Sweet and Maxwell. Stevens and Sons. London. 1894. Volume 5. Pages 206 to 212.
- Paterson (ed). The Practical Statutes of the Session 1866. Horace Cox. London. 1866. Pages 317 to 328.
- Chambers, George F. A Digest of the Law Relating to Commons, and Open Spaces, Including Public Parks, and Recreation Grounds. Stevens and Sons. Shaw and Sons. London. 1877. Pages 34 to 39 and 59.
- Mews, John. "Metropolitan Commons". A Digest of the Reported Decisions of the Courts of Common Law, Bankruptcy, Probate, Admiralty, and Divorce: Together with a Selection from Those of the Court of Chancery and Irish Courts, from 1756 to 1883 Inclusive. H Sweet. Stevens and Sons. W Maxwell and Son. London. 1884. Volume 2. 297 and 298
