= Statute of Westminster 1285 =

Act of the Parliament of England

- Act of Parliament
- Parliament of England
- Long title: Statutes of King Edward made at Westminster, in his Parliament at Easter, in the Thirteenth Year of his Reign.
- Citation: 13 Edw. 1. St. 1
- Territorial extent: England and Wales; Ireland

Dates
- Royal assent: 1285
- Commencement: 1 April 1285 (Note: Start of session.)

Other legislation
- Amended by: Hue and Cry Act 1734; Criminal Statutes Repeal Act 1827; Statute Law Revision Act 1863; Bankruptcy Repeal and Insolvent Court Act 1869; Statute Law Revision Act 1883; Sheriffs Act 1887; Administration of Estates Act 1925; Statute Law Revision Act 1948; Statute Law (Repeals) Act 1969; Commons Act 2006
- Relates to: Statute of Northampton; Statute Law Revision Act 1950

Status: Partially repealed

Text of statute as originally enacted

Revised text of statute as amended

Text of the The Statute of Westminster the Second (De Donis Conditionalibus) 1285 as in force today (including any amendments) within the United Kingdom, from legislation.gov.uk.

The Statute of Westminster of 1285 (13 Edw. 1. St. 1), also known as the Statute of Westminster II or the Statute of Westminster the Second, like the Statute of Westminster 1275 (3 Edw. 1), is a code in itself, and contains the famous clause De donis conditionalibus, one of the fundamental institutes of the medieval land law of England.

William Stubbs says of it:

The law of dower, of advowson, of appeal for felonies, is largely amended; the institution of justices of assize is remodelled, and the abuses of manorial jurisdiction repressed; the statute De religiosis, the statutes of Merton and Gloucester, are amended and re-enacted. Every clause has a bearing on the growth of the later law. The whole, like the first statute of Westminster, is a code in itself…

Most of the statute was repealed in the Republic of Ireland in 1983 and the rest in 2009.

== Chapters ==
The Statute of Westminster II is composed of 50 chapters. The de donis conditionalibus clause is chapter 1, and is still in force. Chapter 46 became known as the Commons Act 1285 (13 Edw. 1. c. 46) and was repealed in England in 2006, and in Wales in 2007.

Chapter	Short title	Title	Notes
1	De donis conditionalibus	In Gifts in Tail the Donor's Will shall be observed. The Form of a Formedon.	Still in force in England and Wales.
2	Replevin Act 1285	A Recordare to remove a Plaint. Pledges to prosecute a Suit. Second Deliverance.	Repealed by Statute Law Revision and Civil Procedure Act 1881 (44 & 45 Vict. c. 59)
3	Real actions	A Cui in vita for the Wife. Where a Wife, or he in Reversion, shall be received.	Repealed for England and Wales by Statute Law Revision Act 1863 (26 & 27 Vict. c. 125) and for Ireland by Statute Law (Ireland) Revision Act 1872 (35 & 36 Vict. c. 98)
4	Real actions	Where the Wife shall be endowable of Lands recovered against her Husband. Where the Heir may avoid a Dower recovered. A remedy for particular Tenants losing by default.	Repealed for England and Wales by Statute Law Revision Act 1863 (26 & 27 Vict. c. 125) and for Ireland by Statute Law (Ireland) Revision Act 1872 (35 & 36 Vict. c. 98)
5	Recovery of Advowsons Act 1285	Remedies to redress Usurpations of Advowsons of Churches, &c.	Repealed by Statute Law (Repeals) Act 1969 (c. 52)
6	Real actions	The Penalty if a Tenant impleaded voucheth, and the Vouchee denieth his Warranty.	Repealed for England and Wales by Statute Law Revision Act 1863 (26 & 27 Vict. c. 125) and for Ireland by Statute Law (Ireland) Revision Act 1872 (35 & 36 Vict. c. 98)
7	Real actions	Admeasurement of Dower for the Guardian and the Heir, and the Process therein.	Repealed for England and Wales by Statute Law Revision Act 1863 (26 & 27 Vict. c. 125) and for Ireland by Statute Law (Ireland) Revision Act 1872 (35 & 36 Vict. c. 98)
8	Real actions	In what Case a Secunda superoneratione Pasturæ shall be awarded.	Repealed for England and Wales by Statute Law Revision Act 1863 (26 & 27 Vict. c. 125) and for Ireland by Statute Law (Ireland) Revision Act 1872 (35 & 36 Vict. c. 98)
9	Real actions	In what Case the Writ of Mesne is to be pursued.	Repealed for England and Wales by Statute Law Revision Act 1863 (26 & 27 Vict. c. 125) and for Ireland by Statute Law (Ireland) Revision Act 1872 (35 & 36 Vict. c. 98)
10	Suits Before Justices in Eyre Act 1285	At what Time Writs shall be delivered for Suits depending before Justices in Eyre. Any Person may make a general Attorney.	Repealed by Civil Procedure Acts Repeal Act 1879 (42 & 43 Vict. c. 59)
11	Accountants Act 1285	The Masters Remedy against their Servants, and other Accomptants.	Repealed by Bankruptcy Repeal and Insolvent Court Act 1869 (32 & 33 Vict. c. 83).
12	Appeal of Felony Act 1285	The Appellant being acquitted, the Appellor and Abettors shall be punished. There shall be no Essoin for the Appellor.	Repealed for England and Wales by Statute Law Revision Act 1863 (26 & 27 Vict. c. 125) and for Ireland by Statute Law (Ireland) Revision Act 1872 (35 & 36 Vict. c. 98)
13	Sheriff's Tourn, etc. Act 1285	The Order of the Indictments taken in the Sheriffs Turn.	Repealed by Sheriffs Act 1887 (50 & 51 Vict. c. 55).
14	Actions of Waste Act 1285	The Process in an Action of Waste. A Writ to enquire of Waste.	Repealed by Civil Procedure Acts Repeal Act 1879 (42 & 43 Vict. c. 59)
15	Suit of Infant by Next Friend Act 1285	An Enfant eloined may sue by Prochein Amy.	Repealed for England and Wales by Statute Law Revision and Civil Procedure Act 1881 (44 & 45 Vict. c. 59) and for Northern Ireland by Statute Law Revision (Northern Ireland) Act 1973 (c. 55) Still in force in the Republic of Ireland.
16	Wardship Act 1285	Priority of Feoffment giveth Title of Wardship.	Repealed for England and Wales by Statute Law Revision Act 1863 (26 & 27 Vict. c. 125) and for Ireland by Statute Law (Ireland) Revision Act 1872 (35 & 36 Vict. c. 98)
17	Essoin Act 1285	In what Case Essoin De malo lecti doth lie, and where not.	Repealed for England and Wales by Statute Law Revision Act 1863 (26 & 27 Vict. c. 125) and for Ireland by Statute Law (Ireland) Revision Act 1872 (35 & 36 Vict. c. 98)
18	Execution of Damages Act 1285	He that recovereth Debt may sue Execution by Fieri facias or Elegit.	Repealed by Bankruptcy Act 1883 (46 & 47 Vict. c. 52) and Statute Law Revision Act 1948 (11 & 12 Geo. 6. c. 62)
19	Administration of Estates Act 1285	The Ordinary chargeable to pay Debts as Executors.	Repealed by Administration of Estates Act 1925 (15 & 16 Geo. 5. c. 23).
20	Real actions	The Tenants Answer in a Writ of Cosinage, Aiel, and Besaiel.	Repealed for England and Wales by Statute Law Revision Act 1863 (26 & 27 Vict. c. 125) and for Ireland by Statute Law (Ireland) Revision Act 1872 (35 & 36 Vict. c. 98)
21	Real actions	A Cessavit by the chief Lord against his Freehold Tenant.	Repealed for England and Wales by Statute Law Revision Act 1863 (26 & 27 Vict. c. 125) and for Ireland by Statute Law (Ireland) Revision Act 1872 (35 & 36 Vict. c. 98)
22	Actions of waste	Waste maintainable by one Tenant in common against another.	Repealed by Civil Procedure Acts Repeal Act 1879 (42 & 43 Vict. c. 59)
23	Executors; writ of accompt	Executors may have a Writ of Accompt.	Repealed by Administration of Estates Act 1925 (15 & 16 Geo. 5. c. 23).
24	Real actions	A Writ of Nuisance of a House, &c. levied and aliened to another. A Quod permittat and Juris utrum for a Parson of a Church. In like Cases like Writs be grantable.	Repealed for England and Wales by Statute Law Revision Act 1863 (26 & 27 Vict. c. 125) and for Ireland by Statute Law (Ireland) Revision Act 1872 (35 & 36 Vict. c. 98)
25	Real actions	Of what Things an Assise shall lie. Certificate of Assise. Attachment in an Assise.	Repealed for England and Wales by Statute Law Revision Act 1863 (26 & 27 Vict. c. 125) and for Ireland by Statute Law (Ireland) Revision Act 1872 (35 & 36 Vict. c. 98)
26	Real actions	Who may bring a Writ of Redisseisin, and the Punishment of the Offender therein.	Repealed for England and Wales by Statute Law Revision Act 1863 (26 & 27 Vict. c. 125) and for Ireland by Statute Law (Ireland) Revision Act 1872 (35 & 36 Vict. c. 98)
27	Essoins	Essoin after inquest, but none after Day given Prece partium.	Repealed for England and Wales by Statute Law Revision Act 1863 (26 & 27 Vict. c. 125) and for Ireland by Statute Law (Ireland) Revision Act 1872 (35 & 36 Vict. c. 98)
28	Real actions	In certain Actions, after Appearance there shall be no Essoin.	Repealed for England and Wales by Statute Law Revision Act 1863 (26 & 27 Vict. c. 125) and for Ireland by Statute Law (Ireland) Revision Act 1872 (35 & 36 Vict. c. 98)
29	Writs of trespass, etc.	To whom only the Writ of Trespass of Oyer and Terminer shall be granted. In what Case the Writ of Odio & Atia is granted.	Repealed by Civil Procedure Acts Repeal Act 1879 (42 & 43 Vict. c. 59)
30	Justices of nisi prius, etc.	The Authority of Justices of Nisi prius. Adjournment of Suits. Certain Writs that be determinable in their proper Counties. A Jury may give their Verdict at large. None but which were summoned shall be put in Assises or Juries.	Repealed for England and Wales by Statute Law Revision and Civil Procedure Act 1881 (44 & 45 Vict. c. 59) and for Scotland and Northern Ireland by Statute Law Revision Act 1950 (14 Geo. 6. c. 6)
31	Bills of exceptions	An Exception to a Plea shall be sealed by the Justices.	Repealed for England and Wales by Statute Law Revision and Civil Procedure Act 1881 (44 & 45 Vict. c. 59) and for Scotland and Northern Ireland by Statute Law Revision Act 1950 (14 Geo. 6. c. 6)
32	Mortmain	Mortmain by Recovery of Land by Default.	Repealed by Mortmain and Charitable Uses Act 1888 (51 & 52 Vict. c. 42)
33	Forfeiture of lands	Lands where Crosses be set, shall be forfeited as Lands aliened in Mortmain.	Repealed by Repeal of Obsolete Statutes Act 1856 (19 & 20 Vict. c. 64)
34	Forfeiture of Dower, etc. Act 1285	It is Felony to commit Rape. A married Woman elopeth with Advouterer. The Penalty for carrying a Nun from her House.	Repealed for England and Wales by Offences Against the Person Act 1828 (9 Geo. 4. c. 31), for India by Criminal Law (India) Act 1828 (9 Geo. 4. c. 74), for Ireland by Offences Against the Person (Ireland) Act 1829 (10 Geo. 4. c. 34), for England and Wales by Administration of Estates Act 1925 (15 & 16 Geo. 5. c. 23), for England and Wales and Scotland by Statute Law Revision Act 1948 (11 & 12 Geo. 6. c. 62) (Note: Section 5(3) of the Statute Law Revision Act 1950 (14 Geo. 6. c. 6) provided the repeal of this chapter by the Statute Law Revision Act 1948 (11 & 12 Geo. 6. c. 62) was to be deemed not to have extended to Northern Ireland.) and for Northern Ireland Property (Northern Ireland) Order 1978 (SI 1978/459).
35	Punishment of him that taketh away a ward	In what Cases do lie a Writ of Ravishment of Ward, Communi Custodia, Ejectione, &c.	Repealed for England and Wales by Statute Law Revision and Civil Procedure Act 1881 (44 & 45 Vict. c. 59) and for Scotland and Northern Ireland by Statute Law Revision Act 1948 (11 & 12 Geo. 6. c. 62)
36	Procurement of Suits Act 1285	A Distress taken upon a Suit commenced by others.	Repealed by Civil Procedure Acts Repeal Act 1879 (42 & 43 Vict. c. 59)
37	Distress Act 1285	No Distress shall be taken but by Baliffs known and sworn.	Repealed by Statute Law (Repeals) Act 1969 (c. 52)
38	Juries Act 1285	How many shall be returned in Juries and petit Assises, and what Age they shall be.	Repealed for England and Wales by Statute Law Revision Act 1863 (26 & 27 Vict. c. 125) and for Ireland by Statute Law (Ireland) Revision Act 1872 (35 & 36 Vict. c. 98)
39	Execution of Process Act 1285	The Manner to deliver Writs to the Sheriff to be executed. The Sheriff returneth a Liberty where none is. Returning of Issues. Resistance of Execution of Process.	Confirmed by the Statute of Northampton (2 Edw. 3. c. 5). Repealed by Sheriffs Act 1887 (50 & 51 Vict. c. 55).
40	Real actions	A Woman's Suit shall not be deferred by the Minority of the Heir.	Repealed for England and Wales by Statute Law Revision Act 1863 (26 & 27 Vict. c. 125) and for Ireland by Statute Law (Ireland) Revision Act 1872 (35 & 36 Vict. c. 98)
41	Alienation by religious houses, etc.	A Conira formam Collationis; and a Cessavit to recover Lands given in Alms.	Repealed by Repeal of Obsolete Statutes Act 1856 (19 & 20 Vict. c. 64)
42	Fees of King's Marshall	The several Fees of Marshals, Chamberlains, Porters of Justices in Eyre, &c.	Repealed by Statute Law (Repeals) Act 1969 (c. 52)
43	Hospitallers and Templars	Hospitallers and Templars shall draw no Man into Suit, &c.	Repealed for England and Wales by Statute Law Revision Act 1863 (26 & 27 Vict. c. 125) and for Ireland by Statute Law (Ireland) Revision Act 1872 (35 & 36 Vict. c. 98)
44	Fees of officers on circuit	The Fees of Porters bearing Verges before the Justices; and of Cirographers, Clerks, &c.	Repealed for England and Wales by Statute Law Revision Act 1863 (26 & 27 Vict. c. 125) and for Ireland by Statute Law (Ireland) Revision Act 1872 (35 & 36 Vict. c. 98)
45	Execution Act 1285	The Process of Execution of Things recorded within the Year, or after.	Repealed by Statute Law Revision Act 1948 (11 & 12 Geo. 6. c. 62)
46	Commons Act 1285	Lords may approve against their Neighbours. Usurpation of Commons during the Estate of particular Tenants.	Repealed for Ireland by Statute Law (Ireland) Revision Act 1872 (35 & 36 Vict. c. 98) and for England and Wales by Commons Act 2006.
47	Salmon Preservation Act 1285	A Penalty for taking of Salmons at certain Times of the Year.	Repealed for England and Wales by Salmon Fishery Act 1861 (24 & 25 Vict. c. 109) and for Ireland Statute Law (Ireland) Revision Act 1872 (35 & 36 Vict. c. 98)
48	Real actions	In what Cases the View of Land is grantable, and what not.	Repealed for England and Wales by Statute Law Revision Act 1863 (26 & 27 Vict. c. 125) and for Ireland by Statute Law (Ireland) Revision Act 1872 (35 & 36 Vict. c. 98)
49	Maintenance and champerty	The Penalty for buying the Title of Land depending in Suit. A Remedy for Suits where the Law faileth.	Repealed by Statute Law Revision Act 1948 (11 & 12 Geo. 6. c. 62)
50	Commencement of statutes	No Man shall depart from the King's Court without Remedy.	Repealed by Civil Procedure Acts Repeal Act 1879 (42 & 43 Vict. c. 59)

== See also ==
- Casu consimili
- Statute of Winchester of 1285 (13 Edw. I, St. 2)
