= The common land and commoners of Ashdown Forest =

The common land of Ashdown Forest in East Sussex, England, a former royal hunting forest created soon after the Norman conquest of England, covers some 6,400 acres (9.5 square miles (2,500 ha)). The map of the common land today largely dates back to 1693, when more than half the medieval Forest was taken into private hands, with the remainder being set aside as common land. The latter is today administered by a Board of Conservators. It is entirely open for public access (subject to various byelaws) and it is the largest area of its kind in South East England.

== The Forest's common land ==
The common land of Ashdown Forest consists of specific areas of Forest, registered under the Commons Registration Act 1965, which only those who possess particular rights of common — commoners — are entitled to use and exploit in certain specified ways. The common land is owned by the Lord of the Manor of Duddleswell (which, since 1988, has been the Ashdown Forest Trust, an agent of East Sussex County Council). Since 1885, the common land has been regulated and protected by a statutory Board of Conservators.

The distribution of common land around Ashdown Forest is very fragmented. This reflect directly the division of the Forest that was made in the late 17th century by Duchy of Lancaster commissioners who had been appointed to settle a long-standing dispute over rights of common on the Forest, which had culminated in a lawsuit against 133 commoners. In 1693 the commissioners allotted more than half the 13,991 acres of ancient forest exclusively for 'inclosure and improvement' by private interests, but reserved the remainder, 6,400 acres, as common land. Much of the latter was spread in fragments around the periphery of the Forest close to existing settlements. Although the Lord of the Manor still held the freehold of the common land, his rights to exploit it were very restricted; for example, only the commoners now had the right to graze livestock there.

Today, Ashdown Forest's common land, to which the public have been given open access (subject to bye-laws administered by the Conservators), mainly consists of the land that was set aside in 1693. To it have been added some tracts of land more recently acquired by the Conservators. In addition, there have been small-scale changes in the geographical distribution of the common land, for example, after small compensating exchanges of land have taken place as a result of military requisitions. Reference to detailed large-scale maps held by the Board of Conservators is often required to determine whether a particular piece of land forms part of Ashdown Forest's common land or not.

== The Forest's rights of common ==
A right of common may be defined as:

"...a right, which one or more persons may have, to take or use some portion of that which another man's soil naturally produces..."

The rights of common on Ashdown Forest have varied over time. Those that remain today, which are subject to local byelaws and are under the control of the Conservators, are:

- pasturage (or grazing rights): the right to graze sheep, cattle, goats, geese or mill horses (horses that provide power for the mill) on the Forest. The entitlement depends on the numbers and type originally registered for the commonable land holding in 1965 under the Commons Registration Act. Sheep did not become commonable until the 1870s. Unfortunately, owing to dangers caused by traffic and economic pressures, no grazing rights have been exercised on the open, unenclosed Forest since the removal of sheep in 1985.
- estovers: today, understood to be the right to cut birch, willow or alder for use in the "ancestral hearth", which may only be exercised at certain times and in certain areas designated by the Conservators. Previously, estovers consisted of four different elements:
  - house-bote: wood for repairs to the house.
  - fire-bote: fuel for the commoner's house.
  - plough-bote: wood for repairing instruments of husbandry.
  - hay-bote: wood for repairing fences around the commoner's land.
- brakes and litter: the right to cut brake (bracken) and heather and to collect litter for the principal purpose of bedding down livestock in winter on the land-holding.

Today, every commoner has some or all of these commonable rights to a varying degree. The rights of common may be claimed by landowner or tenant, but, as already noted, they are attached to the properties they hold, not to them as individuals. The extent to which rights of common could be exercised, for example the number of animals that could be grazed on the Forest, or the amount of wood that could be cut, depended, and still depends, on the size of the land-holding concerned. Most properties with common rights have identical rights, but in some cases certain rights of common may be absent.

There are also a number of rights of common often found in some form in forests elsewhere in England that do not apply on Ashdown Forest. These are:

- Pannage: the right pasture pigs on the Forest. It was customary to drive swine onto the Forest so that they could feed on acorns and beech mast. This used to be very significant: according to a 1297 record the Forest was also being grazed by almost 2,700 swine. But the right of pannage seems to have died out by around 1500, possibly due to the loss of the previously extensive beech and oak woodlands from the Forest, which may in turn be linked to the rapid expansion of the local iron-industry from the late 15th century onwards with its huge demand for charcoal.
- Turbary: the right to cut turf or peat for fuel. This right of common was outlawed in 1885, when the first Ashdown Forest Act was passed into law, because of the damage it had been causing to the forest floor during the 19th century.
- Piscary: the right to fish the lakes, ponds or streams of the Forest.
- Marling: the right to take soil or stone for use on the commonable holding.

== The Forest commoners ==
An Ashdown Forest commoner today is a person who enjoys a specific right of common over the registered common land of the Forest. These rights of common are attached to land registered under the Commons Registration Act 1965. The rights are not attached to people or houses. To become a commoner a person must acquire commonable land; conversely, a person selling a commonable property ceases to be a commoner. Where a commonable property is sold off in smaller portions, the commonable rights are apportioned in accordance with the acreage of each portion. Following the 1885 Act of Parliament that set up the current system of Forest regulation, all commoners are obliged to pay a Forest Rate (based on the acreage of commonable land held) to contribute towards the administration of the Forest by the Board of Conservators, and they are entitled to elect five commoners' representatives to the Board.

The subdivision of commonable properties from the end of the 19th century onwards increased significantly the numbers of Forest commoners. However, this increase was accompanied by a sharp decline in commoners' exploitation of their rights of common on the Forest, which became most marked after World War II. Those commoners who operated smallholdings around the Forest found that they were increasingly unable to compete with cheaper agricultural produce from elsewhere. Many decided to give up their onerous work and moved to jobs in nearby towns and cities or else retired, in some cases selling up to commuters looking for an attractive country retreat. In 1965, more than half the 1,300 Forest commoners, perhaps deterred by the bureaucratic process involved or apathetic, failed to register under the Commons Registration Act, losing forever the rights of common that were attached to their land. Today, about 730 properties in and around Ashdown Forest retain commonable rights, but very few owners exercise the rights of common attached to them. While most commoners live on or close to the Forest, in villages and hamlets or on smallholdings and isolated properties, some reside much further away.

It should be highlighted that the commoners, historically, were not necessarily "common" people; they were simply people whose landholdings had rights of common on the Forest attached to them. In practice they ranged from lowly tenants or landowners running small, subsistence farm-holdings scraping a living off the forest to major local landowners of high social standing. So, for example, in the 19th century the main protagonist on behalf of the commoners in the celebrated legal dispute between the commoners and the Lord of the Manor, the seventh Earl de la Warr, about their rights of common on the Forest was Bernard Hale, a barrister and Deputy Lieutenant of Sussex, while the other commoners backing him included Sir Percy Maryon-Wilson Bart., the Duke of Norfolk, the 3rd Earl of Sheffield, Lady Shelley and the 3rd Baron Colchester of Kidbrooke Park.

== The historical development of rights of common on the Forest ==
The rights of common on Ashdown Forest have evolved from the long-standing customary practices of the local people who used and exploited the Forest over many centuries, and they quite possibly date back to the Anglo-Saxon period. So, while the names of common rights mentioned above are Norman-French in origin and would have been introduced following the Norman Conquest of 1066, particularly in conjunction with the imposition of Forest Law, the practices they refer to may be much older. For example, the exploitation of the extensive and often dense woodlands of the Weald to pasture swine or cattle, or to collect firewood or fell timber, etc., developed in Anglo-Saxon times as the coastal Saxon and Jutish populations (of Sussex and Kent respectively) began to exploit and in due course colonize the Weald, within which Ashdown is centrally located. The seasonal movement into the Weald of livestock such as (especially) pigs, sometimes being driven over great distances, to feed in the woods and clearings, along with the emergence of elongated manors that extended far into the Wealden interior woodland and heathland wastes, were characteristic features of this colonisation. These practices may in due course have evolved into the 'rights of common' that existed over wastes like Ashdown Forest.

In the later medieval period the commoners were able to access and exploit the Forest even though it had become subject to forest law and was being used for the hunting of deer and other game, provided they acted within limits dictated by the need to protect the Forest's vert and venison. In 1268 the Crown declared 14,000 acres of this part of the High Weald as a royal hunting forest. Yet it is known from a survey of Ashdown in 1273 that there were at that time 208 customary tenants living on the edge of the Forest who were allowed to take windfall wood (but not if the wind had torn a tree up by its roots, in which case it still belonged to the King), brushwood, furze and broom for fuel and to graze as much stock as they could winter on their own holdings. The survey also allowed that "if it be necessary for the improvement of their common pasture, they may burn all the aforesaid". The same survey shows that in 1273 what must have been thick beech forest was being grazed by a large swine population, consisting of 2,133 hogs (swine for pork) and 557 pigs (young boars and sows). Besides pigs, at the end of the 13th century the commoners were also turning out 2,000-3,000 cattle, alongside the 1,000-2,000 deer that were also present on the Forest.

The rights of common enabled local smallholders to practise a simple pastoral system that still operated until quite recently. During the summer they would turn out their livestock onto the forest to graze; this would allow them to use the fields close to their smallholdings (the in-bye land) to produce hay for winter fodder or to grow cereals. In the winter, they would bring their animals indoors and bed them down on litter, traditionally bracken and other vegetation that commoners would cut in the Forest using scythes. When spring came the smallholder would take the manure-laden litter and cover the in-bye land with it to improve its fertility.

== The influence of commoning on the Forest's landscape and ecology ==
The predominantly heathland character of Ashdown Forest owes much to the activities of its commoners over many centuries. Their exploitation and management of the Forest through such activities as the grazing of livestock, the cutting of trees for firewood, the scything of bracken and other vegetation for the bedding of livestock, the periodic burning of vegetation, and so on, played a vital role in inhibiting the growth of scrub and woodland and maintaining open heathland. In addition, the resistance of the commoners to the enclosure of Ashdown Forest in the 17th century resulted in almost half the original Forest remaining as common land, while their resistance in the 19th century to attempts to limit their rights of common on the Forest ultimately led to the formation of the Board of Conservators, which today manages the Forest for the public good. It is thus largely owing to the commoners that the Forest remains today a large expanse of beautiful, predominantly open and uncultivated heathland, the largest public access space in south-east England.

Unfortunately, the rapid decline in commoning after the end of World War II had a major negative impact on the Forest's landscape and ecology as, without human intervention, heath becomes old and woody, bracken spreads and scrubby birch and other trees invade. A rapid loss of the Forest's open heathland to scrub and trees took place from the late 1940s onwards, threatening the many specialised and rare plants and animals that depend on the heathland and jeopardising the Forests's famous open landscape with its magnificent vistas, so well captured in Shepherd's Winnie-the-Pooh illustrations. The Board of Conservators has therefore been forced in recent years to move beyond its original administrative and regulatory functions to play a much more active, interventionist role in combating the invasion of scrub and trees and returning the heathland to favourable condition.

== Bibliography ==
- Glyn, Philip; Prendergast, Hew (1995). Ashdown Forest, An Illustrated Guide. Essedon Press. ISBN 0-9525549-0-9.
- Penn, Roger (1984). Portrait of Ashdown Forest. London: Robert Hale. ISBN 0-7090-1219-5.
- Straker, Ernest (1940). Ashdown Forest and Its Inclosures. Sussex Archaeological Society, 121-135.
