= Court of equity =

Court authorized to apply principles of equity to cases

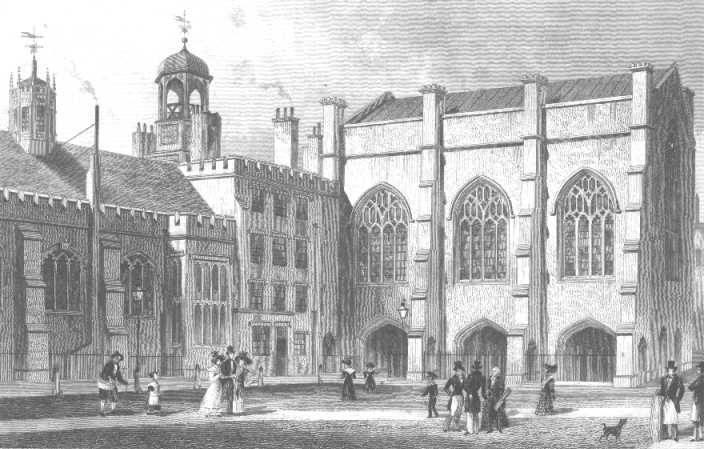
Lincoln's Inn (old) hall, chapel and chancery court, 1830

A court of equity, also known as an equity court or chancery court, is a court authorized to apply principles of equity rather than principles of law to cases brought before it. These courts originated from petitions to the Lord Chancellor of England and primarily heard claims for relief other than damages, such as specific performance and extraordinary writs. Over time, most equity courts merged with courts of law, and the adoption of various Acts granted courts combined jurisdiction to administer common law and equity concurrently. Courts of equity are now recognized for complementing the common law by addressing its shortcomings and promoting justice.

In the early years of the United States, some states followed the English tradition of maintaining separate courts for law and equity. Others combined both types of jurisdiction in their courts, as the U.S. Congress did for federal courts. United States bankruptcy courts serve as an example of a federal court that operates as a court of equity. A few common law jurisdictions, such as the U.S. states of Delaware, Mississippi, New Jersey, South Carolina, and Tennessee, continue to preserve the distinctions between law and equity as well as between courts of law and courts of equity. In New Jersey, this distinction is upheld between the civil and general equity divisions of the New Jersey Superior Court.

== History ==
The unique nature of courts of equity is a result of their historical evolution. This history has been crucial in shaping their application in case law, reflecting the values that have developed the equitable jurisdiction. The transformation of these courts demonstrates the evolution of equity's doctrines and remedies, changes in its dominant nature and traits, and the influence of social and political environments on its operation and underlying issues in jurisprudence.

=== Equity as a body of law ===
Equity is currently recognized as a distinct body of law, administered by various modern courts. The evolution of procedures within courts of equity has guided the application of equitable principles. Originating from the diverse rules of the early Courts of Chancery, today's courts can exercise equitable jurisdiction while maintaining their inherent discretionary abilities to address new forms of injustice. Equity is not an independent body of law; rather, it is synonymous with corrective justice and complements common law to counterbalance its inflexible rules.

=== Origin of the equity jurisdiction ===
The historical emergence of equity occurred during three significant periods: the medieval period (13th–15th centuries), the formative period (16th–17th centuries), and the period of systematization (17th–19th centuries). Throughout these periods, equity developed progressively from the Chancellor providing equitable relief based on personal conscience to an established and organized body of law governed by courts.

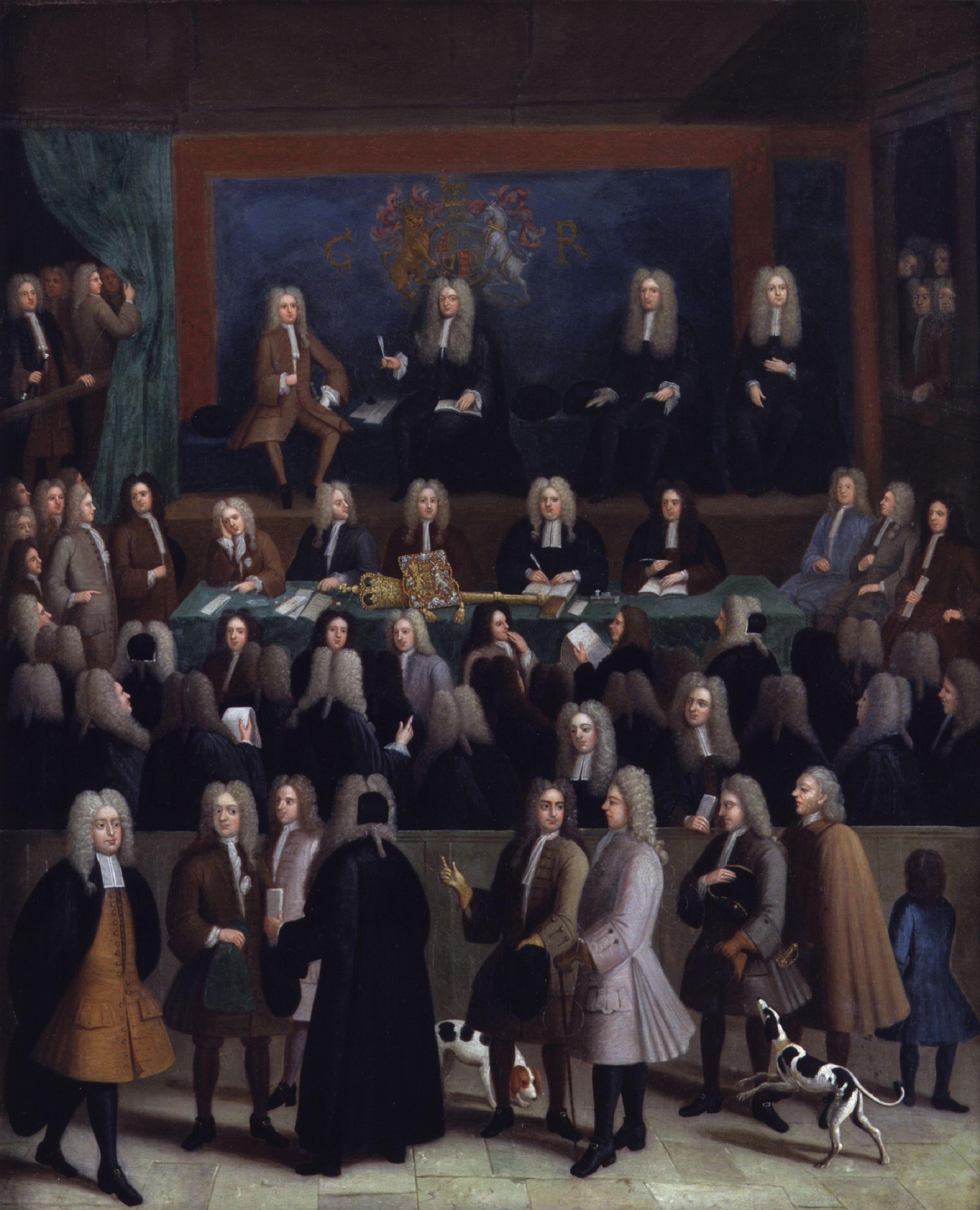
The Court of Chancery in the reign of King George I

==== Medieval period ====
The Chancery Division was established in the 13th century by the King after the separation of the Supreme Court of Judicature. Under the Chancellor's authority, the "King's law" prevailed in local courts. The division did not handle actual cases but performed functions associated with the King's secretarial department. Although the Chancery Division did not function as a court, judicial activity was still present. Limited discretionary power was provided, determining the validity of writs issued in courts and permitting only those in consimili casu. These were enforced temporarily and could be overridden by the courts of law if deemed to conflict with the actual law of the land. As the administrative operations of the division expanded through its implicit control of the King's residual influence, the Chancellor became responsible for addressing "prayers" and "petitions", including letters of remedy, relief, and grants on behalf of the King. During the 14th and 15th centuries, the Chancery developed into an independent and extensive bureaucracy. Its formalized role involved issuing writs regarding inheritance or property transfers, which served as the justice's authorization for initiating claims in the King's courts.

==== Formative period ====
In the 16th century, the modern system of equity and the Chancellor evolved into a body with recognized judicial features. Consequently, the jurisdiction within the courts experienced greater autonomy. This involved the Court of Chancery issuing decrees independently of the King's Council, the Chancellors becoming proficient in law, and a more systematized role in resolving petitions. As it developed into a substantive judicial court with increased power, other common law courts became wary and defensive towards their jurisdiction. The court was one of specific jurisdiction with distinct procedures compared to common law courts, such as the Court of Chancery issuing a common injunction rather than common law injunctive relief.

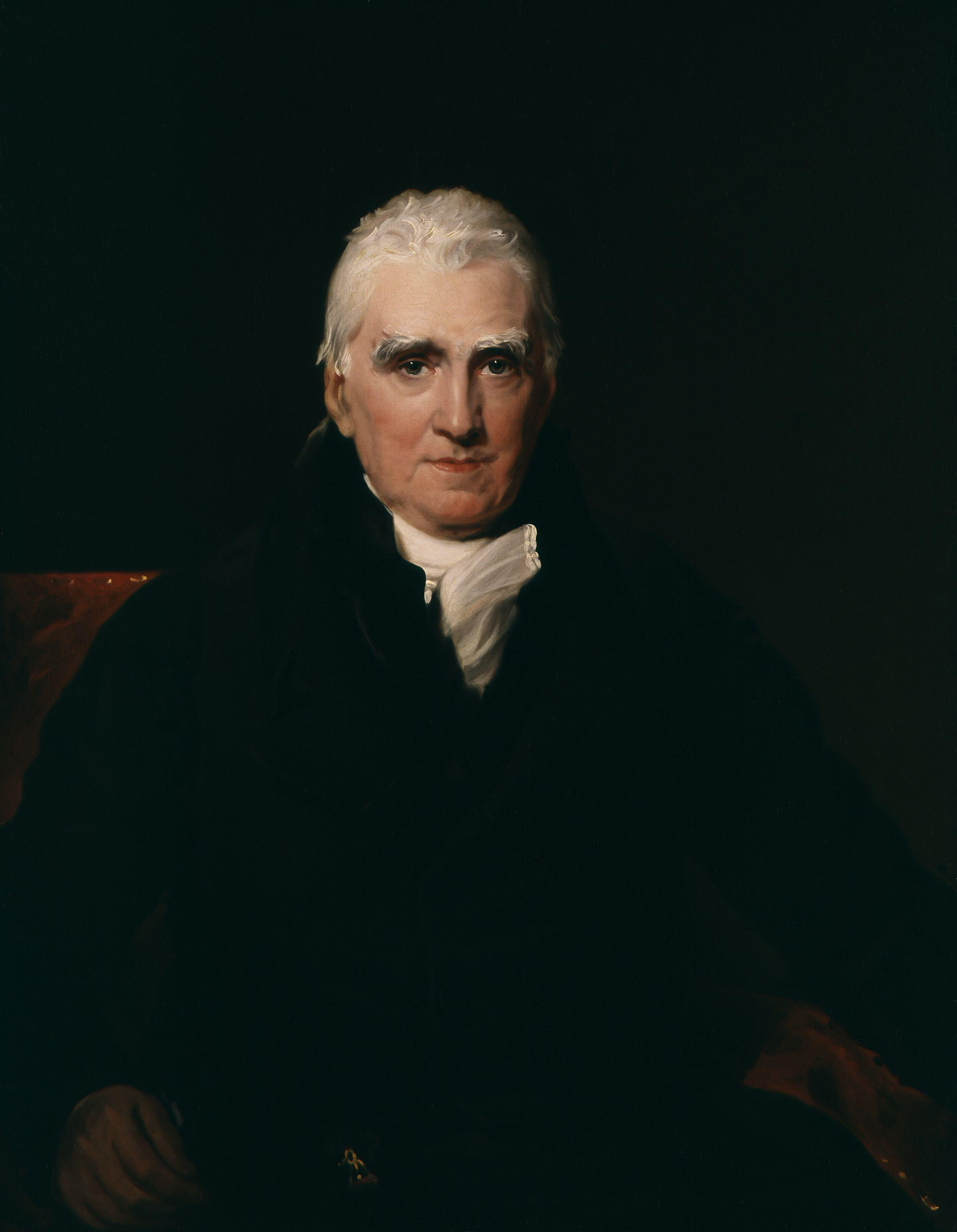
John Scott, 1st Earl of Eldon, Lord High Chancellor of Great Britain

==== Period of systemisation ====
The systemisation of equity is often credited to Lord Eldon and the introduction of the Judicature Acts in 1873. He rationalized the rules and principles found in modern equity today, to provide enhanced consistency and certainty. As a result, equity existed in conjunction with the common law. Prior to this, the Courts of Chancery experienced shortcomings and a "period of decline and stagnation" during the early 18th century. Such defects included jurisdictional delays, administrative complications, costly proceedings and burdensome processes.

=== The High Court of Chancery ===
By the early 1500s, a vast proportion of the court's workload was attributed to cases concerning equity. W.S. Holdsworth believed that the principles of equity were developed by and through the Chancery, and recognised three factors that influenced the evolution of such jurisdiction:

antagonism to the rigidity of the common law; ideas about the function of conscience in determining equitable rules; and a procedure, distinct from that of common law, that allowed the chancellor to decide the most equitable course to take in each individual case.

== Equity and Common Law ==
=== A merged administration ===
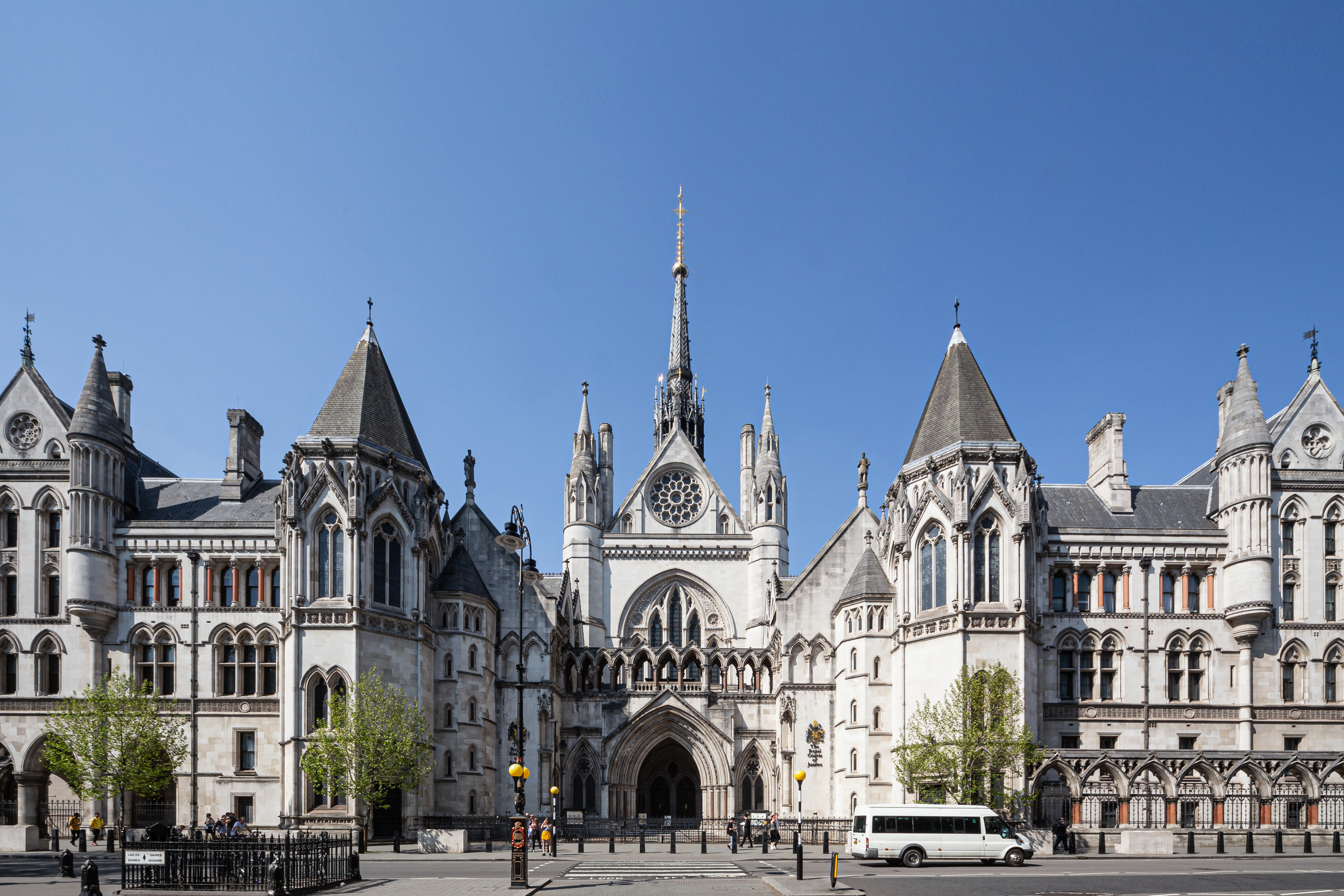
Royal Courts of Justice in the City of Westminster, where the High Court of Justice is based

The passing of the English Judicature Act 1873 established the new High Court of Justice and Court of Appeal division to substitute the old Chancery, Common Pleas, Queen's Bench and Exchequer Courts. Subsequently, changes in the court's administration included the ability for separate divisions to obtain coexisting jurisdiction in relation to common law and equitable principles. As Lord Watson stated, the main purpose of this Act was to provide parties to a litigation "all remedies to which they are entitled". This prevents the need to recourse to another court and reduces the unnecessary profusion of legal proceedings.

=== Relationship between common law and equity ===
Prior to the enactments of the Judicature Acts, equity courts occupied a discrete jurisdiction to the common law. It was prohibited to transfer an action, and if proceedings were initiated in the incorrect court, the entire case must be brought again from the beginning. The administrative inefficiency created by the operation of separate courts became excessively onerous, that it demanded a comprehensive overhaul of the system.

As a result of the post-judicature systems and Earl of Oxford's case (1615) allowing an overlapping of claims brought before the merged modern courts, equity would prevail over the common law (common injunctions will be upheld) in situations of conflict or discrepancy between the opposing principles.

==== Exclusive jurisdiction ====
Prior to the introduction of the Judicature systems, the enforcement of equitable claims could only occur in a Court of Chancery who held the power to grant relief, and not by the common law. Equating to new rights, exclusive jurisdiction provided relief against breaches of legal privileges which were not preserved by equity within the concurrent jurisdiction. Such intervention was sanctioned as it ensured irreversible injury was effectively compensated by damages, and it prevented the multiplicity of claims regarding the same issue. The body of law/court acts without right where it interferes with the other who has exclusive jurisdiction; allowing for the relevant sovereign to be curtailed. The nature of the exclusive jurisdiction was defined by Ashburner as:

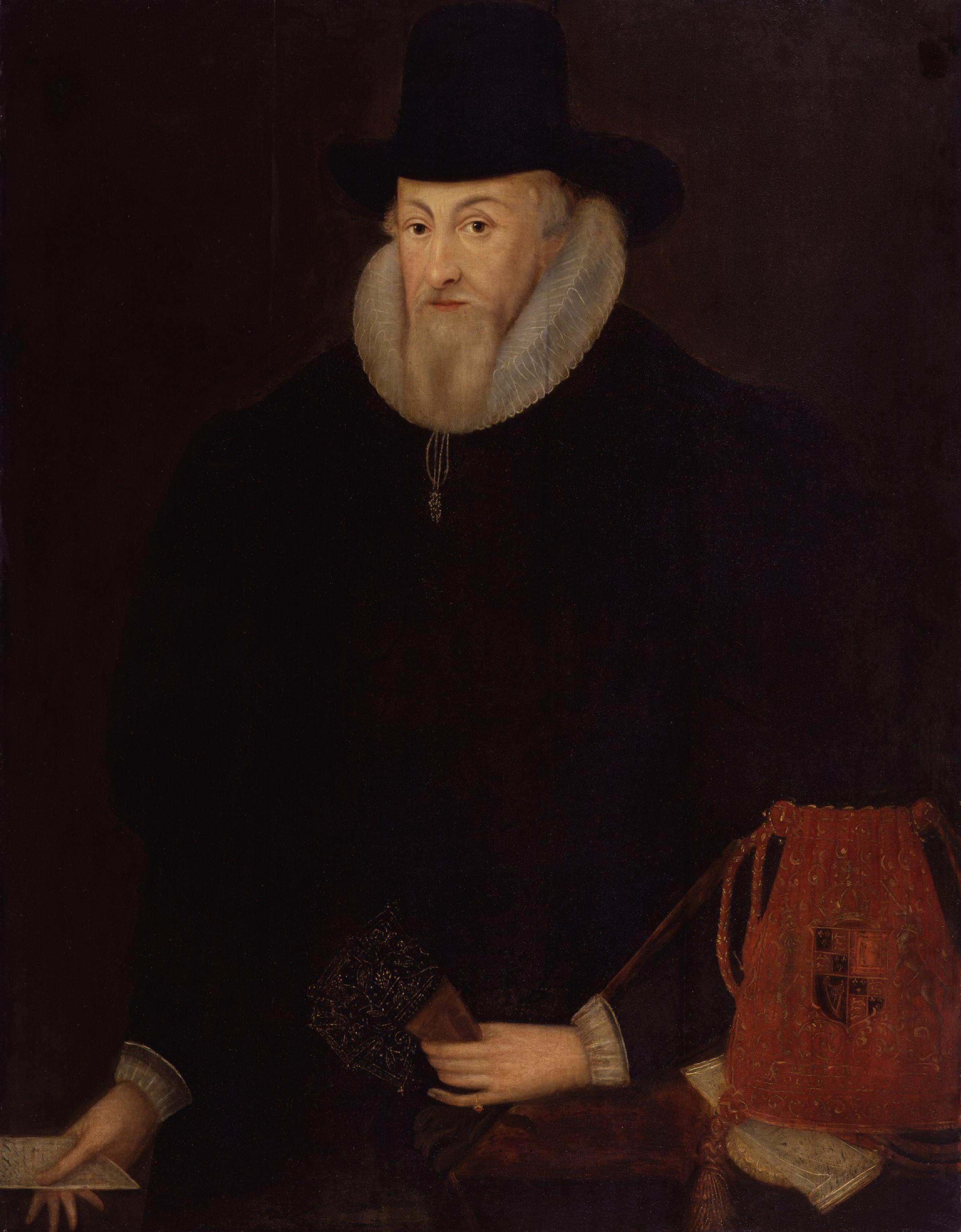
Thomas Egerton, 1st Viscount Brackley, was the Lord Chancellor who gave judgment in the Earl of Oxford's case; which held that equity takes precedence over the common law.

The claim of the plaintiff was one which before the Judicature Act would have given him no right whatever against the defendant in any court but the Court of Chancery, and the court of Chancery, in granting relief was said to exercise its exclusive jurisdiction.

==== Concurrent jurisdiction ====
Concurrent jurisdiction recognises situations where the facts in a pleading brought by a party produces both common law and equity actions, with the same relief issued at either. The requirement post-Judicature system allowed a claimant to attend only one court, rather than two, to enforce both the common law and equitable principles regarding the breach and remedy. Associated with new remedies, this jurisdiction empowers an applicant to pursue equitable relief where it can be established that the appropriate relief under common law is insufficient to do justice. There is no rivalry between the two jurisdictions; given that they can freely undertake proceedings as though the other didn't exist, and no grievances or restraints are made between them regarding the validity of their operations. The objective of this jurisdiction is to provide "a more perfect remedy or to apply a more perfect procedure than the other court could give or apply".

==== Auxiliary jurisdiction ====
Associated with new procedure, auxiliary jurisdiction recognises situations of equity assisting in proceedings through the enforcement of legal rights where it did not have concurrent jurisdiction over the matter. The Court of Chancery did not arbitrate where adequate relief was accessible at common law and the adjudication of the legality of the litigant's claim was left to the responsibility of common law courts. This meant that the common law was binding on equity. Auxiliary jurisdiction merely acted "as ancillary to the administration of justice in other courts". Related to pre-trial, the court of equity has the power to produce documents which common law courts could not as a tool for discovery procedures. The court is required to maintain the present state of affairs, without any direct relief, until the parties’ rights are dictated at common law. It also has the authority after settlement to aid in relief by deliberating a more effective remedy on the litigant, who previously attained common law relief.

== Nature ==
=== Powers of courts of equity ===
The courts of equity in England are recognised for operating in personam, while the common law courts act in rem. This means that the court of equity's jurisdiction constitutes acts only against the conscience of a person or a number of persons, rather than a claim against an item of property. Yet, there are several exceptions to this.

Roman copy in marble of Aristotle by Lysippos, c. 330 BC. Aristotle discussed the nature of equity and its relation to justice.

Given that equity does not pertain definitive or formal rules, the courts are required to assess explicit conduct through its flexible nature and discretionary powers. The courts address fundamental principles of good faith, generosity, morality, honesty and integrity, while also evaluating the relative fairness between the parties. Provided the latitude of the Chancellor's discretion and scope of equitable remedies, it has allowed the courts to consider the interests of the public at large when providing or refusing relief to the plaintiff.

In contrast to the rulings in the King's or Common Bench where the judgements are binding upon the rights of a party, equitable decrees only bind the person to obedience. Although the Chancellor has the authority to compel a person to punishment until they obey, the decree can also serve as a defence to future cases (regarding the same claim) in the Court of Chancery to provide a satisfactory reason why the Chancellor should not consider it again.

=== Administration of justice ===
As equity is perceived in an ethical context, the courts often encapsulate this as fair, moral, ethical and just conduct. As Aristotle highlighted, equitable conduct can be said to be just as it promotes the improvement of the deficiencies of the universal concept. He concludes that equity's role within the courts "is to prevent the law from adhering too rigidly to its own rules and principles when those rules and principles produce injustice". Given that equitable principles are not absolute in nature, it is acceptable for the courts to depart from any rules when they conflict with justice. Unlike legal justice, equitable justice develops on an individualised and case-by-case basis within the courts for the purpose of enhancing just outcomes and to adequately judge the requirements of specific circumstances.

=== Protection of personal rights ===
As the jurisdiction of the equity courts evolved, it was no longer limited to the protection of prescribed rights and eventually took cognizance of cases not generally conforming with its jurisdiction – such as criminal cases. Given that defamation highly concerns personal rights, post-Judicature Act has allowed a court of equity to exercise its jurisdiction to prevent the publication of false declarations determined to cause harm to an individual's trade. A limitation to a court of equity's jurisdiction in this area is its inability to prohibit the publication of false or derogatory statements detrimental to a plaintiff's profession or title to property – whereby such assertions are not attendant to threats, coercion, intimidation, or any direct attack.

== Comparison of the courts of equity ==
=== Australia ===
The judicature system has been implemented across Australia, with South Australia being the first to enact it in 1853. Corresponding Acts to the Supreme Court of Judicature Act 1873 (UK) include Supreme Court Act 1935 (SA) ss 17-28, Civil Proceedings Act 2011 (Qld) s 7, Supreme Court Act 1935 (WA) ss 24–25, Supreme Court Act 1986 (Vic) s 29, Supreme Court Civil Procedure Act 1932 (Tas) ss 10–11, Supreme Court Act 1970 (NSW) ss 57–62 and Law Reform (Law and Equity) Act 1972 (NSW).

Despite there being a single Supreme Court of New South Wales with complete jurisdiction within both common law and equity prior to the adoption of the Judicature Act in NSW, they remained being treated as separate courts.

=== India ===
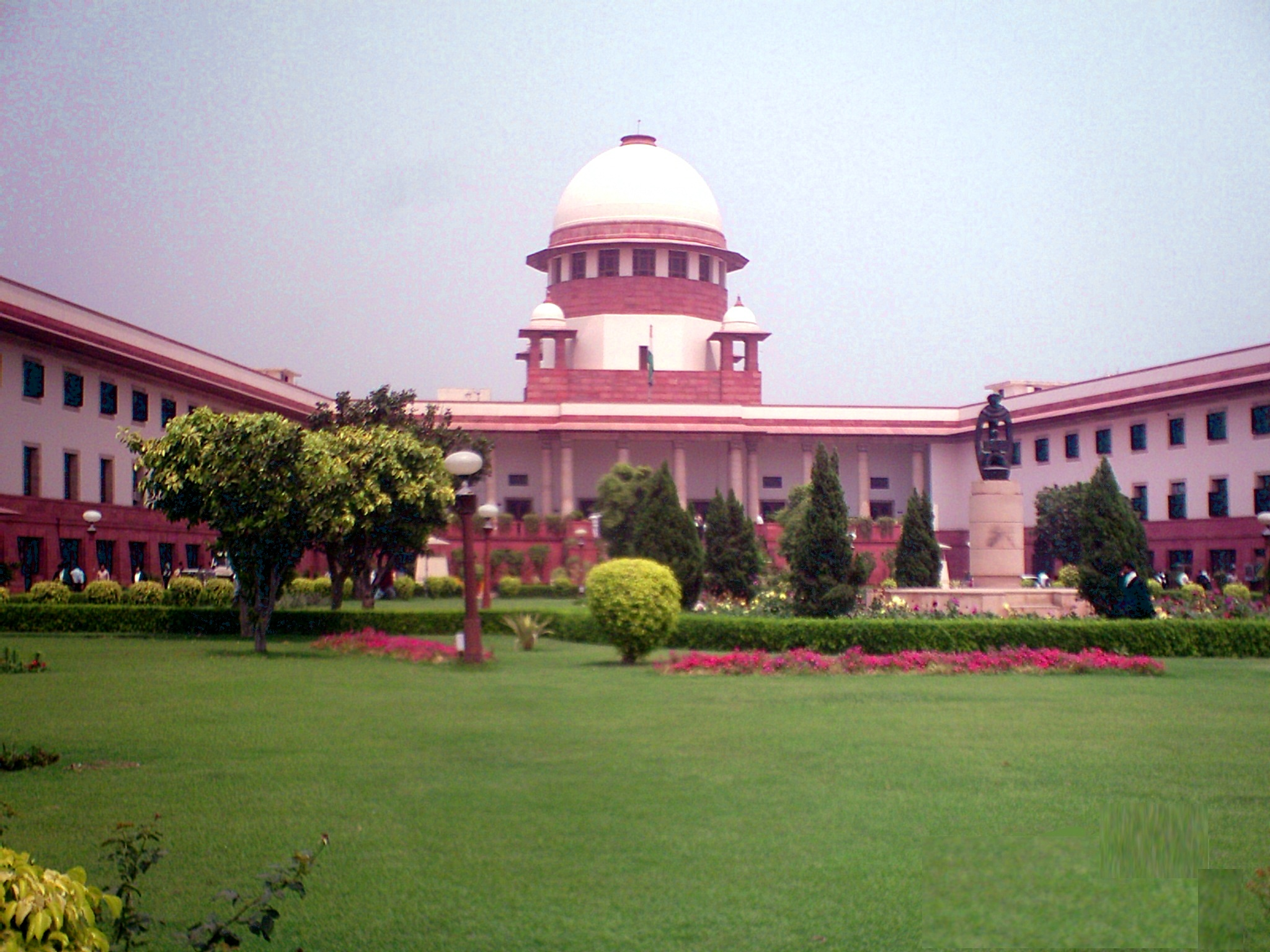
Supreme Court of India building

Unlike most countries, the equity jurisdiction always operated and was administered in conjunction with the law in India, through the courts, and not in resistance to it. Following the British codification of the law in India, equitable principles were embedded in the judicial frameworks of the courts. The courts have relied on equity "as a source of law to devise a new principle in a situation where the statute or codified law had no answer to a given situation". The Supreme Court of India recognised this fusion of the law by further expanding the application of its equitable and remedial powers in the areas of environmental degradation, tort law, strict liability doctrines and human rights.

=== Scotland ===
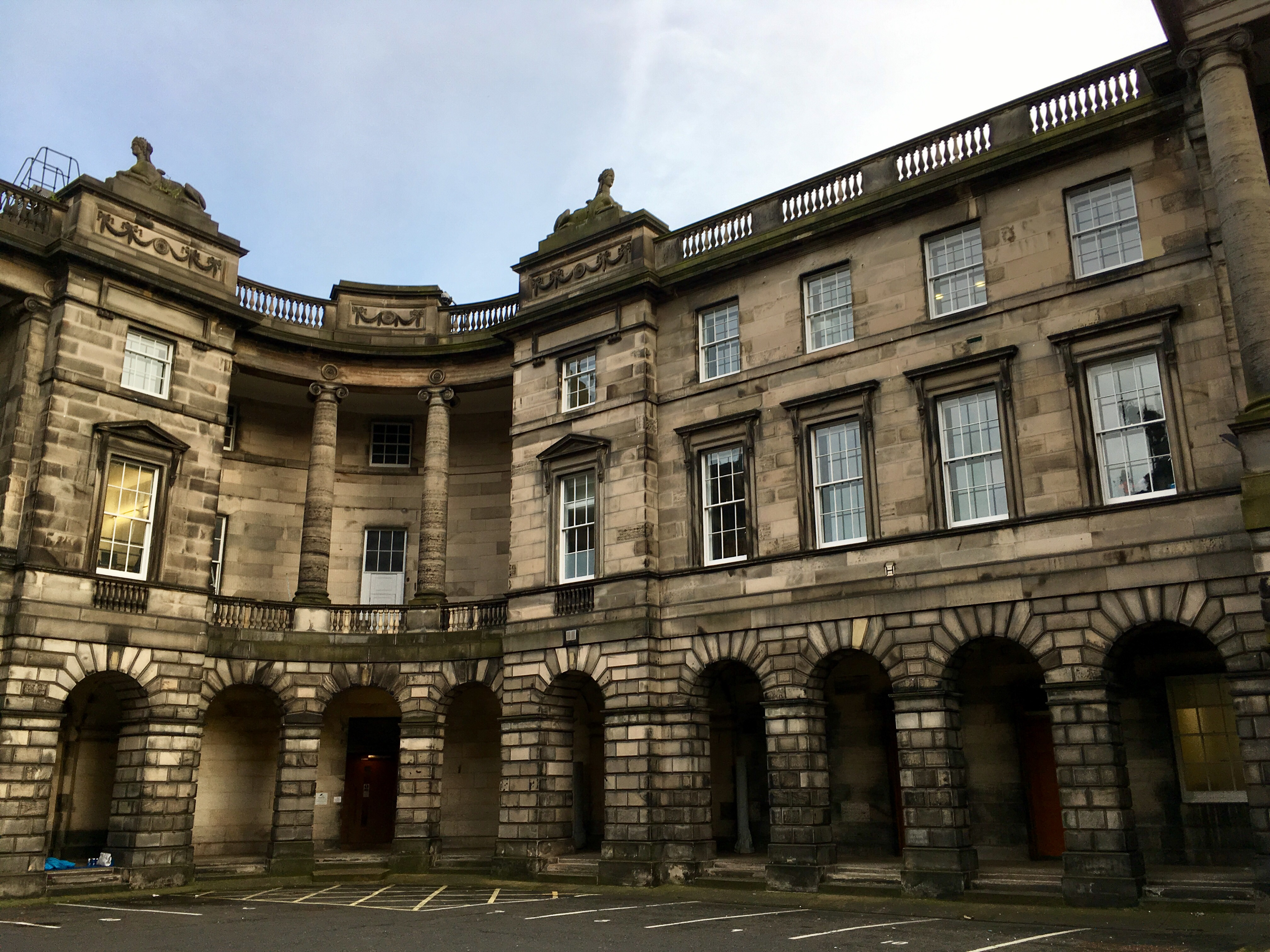
High Court of Justiciary And Court of Session (collectively known as the Supreme Courts of Scotland), Edinburgh

As there is no separate court in Scotland which exclusively operates an equity jurisdiction, the country's legal system is classified as mixed. The Court of Session controls both jurisdictions, by differentiating between common law and equity throughout cases brought before it. This provides greater certainty to parties, given that the court has the power to provide relief in either equity or common law where the party is not entitled to one or the other. As the two jurisdictions became indistinguishable, "what in effect was a rule in equity became in practice considered as common law". Scottish lawyers have raised concern that this system would create unjust decisions where cases are approached in terms of combining equity and common law reasoning. Others followed Lord Kames's view of a dual approach, whereby equity in the court existed for the purpose of creating "new equitable rules which gradually hardened into common law by virtue of their usage across time".

=== United States ===
The period after the American Revolution saw the abolition of chancery courts (or their merger with courts of law) in American states such as Massachusetts, New York, and Virginia. That was the result of equity being disfavoured and rejected until, late in the 19th century, federal judges revived the equitable injunction. The early amendments of the United States Constitution explicitly acknowledged common law and equity as being clear divisions of jurisprudence. However, Rule 2 of the Federal Rules of Civil Procedure came into effect in 1938 to unite common law with equitable claims. Other states maintained their courts of equity, although many have more recently merged them with their courts of law. Only Delaware, Mississippi and Tennessee still have separate equity courts, such as the Delaware Court of Chancery.

== See also ==
- Court of Chancery
- Court of Chancery (Ireland)
- Court of Chancery of the County Palatine of Durham and Sadberge
- Court of Chancery of the County Palatine of Lancaster
- Court of Requests
- Court of the Star Chamber
- Delaware Court of Chancery
- Exchequer of Pleas
- Michigan Court of Chancery
- New York Court of Chancery
