= Commons Act 1285 =

Act of the Parliament of England

Commons Act 1285 (Note: The citation of this act by this short title was authorised by section 5 of, and the second schedule to, the Statute Law Revision Act 1948. Due to the repeal of those provisions, it is now authorised by section 19(2) of the Interpretation Act 1978.)
- Act of Parliament
- Parliament of England
- Long title: Lords may approve common against their neighbours leaving them sufficient . . . (Note: These words are printed against this act in the second column of the second schedule to the Statute Law Revision Act 1948, which is headed "Title".)
- Citation: 13 Edw. 1. c. 46
- Territorial extent: England and Wales; Ireland; India

Dates
- Royal assent: 1285
- Commencement: 1285
- Repealed: India: 1 March 1829; Ireland: 10 August 1872; England and Wales: 19 July 2006 (Note: The Commons Act 2006 (Commencement No.1, Transitional Provisions and Savings) (Wales) Order 2007 (SI 2007/2386).)

Other legislation
- Amended by: Criminal Statutes Repeal Act 1827; Statute Law Revision Act 1950
- Repealed by: India: Criminal Law (India) Act 1828; Ireland: Statute Law (Ireland) Revision Act 1872; England and Wales: Commons Act 2006
- Relates to: Statute of Westminster 1285

Status: Repealed

Text of statute as originally enacted

Revised text of statute as amended

The Commons Act 1285 (13 Edw. 1. c. 46) was an act of the Parliament of England. It was chapter 46 of the Statute of Westminster the Second.

== Subsequent developments ==
The act was extended to Ireland by Poynings' Law 1495 (10 Hen. 7. c. 22 (I)).

So much of this statute as ordained that the towns near adjoining were to be distrained to levy, at their own cost, a hedge or dyke overthrown, and to yield damages, was repealed, as to England and Wales, by the Criminal Statutes Repeal Act 1826 (7 & 8 Geo. 4. c. 27). It was repealed to the same extent, on 1 March 1829, as to all persons, matters and things over whom or which the jurisdiction of any of the King's courts of justice erected within the British Dominions under the government of the United Company of Merchants of England trading to the East Indies extended by section 125 of the Criminal Law (India) Act 1828 (9 Geo. 4. c. 74).

The whole act was repealed for Ireland by section 1 of, and the schedule to, the Statute Law Revision Act 1872 (No. 2) (35 & 36 Vict. c. 97), which came into force on 10 August 1872.

The whole act, so far as unrepealed, was repealed for Northern Ireland by section 1(1) of, and the first schedule to, the Statute Law Revision Act 1950 (14 Geo. 6. c. 6), which came into force on 23 May 1950.

The whole act was repealed for England and Wales by section 47(1) of, and part 3 of schedule 6 to, the Commons Act 2006, which came into force on 19 July 2006.

== See also ==
- Commons Act
