= Metropolitan Commons Act 1878 =

Act of the Parliament of the United Kingdom

Metropolitan Commons Act 1878 (Note: Section 1.)
- Act of Parliament
- Parliament of the United Kingdom
- Long title: An Act to extend to Metropolitan Commons certain provisions of the Commons Act, 1876.
- Citation: 41 & 42 Vict. c. 71
- Territorial extent: United Kingdom

Dates
- Royal assent: 16 August 1878
- Commencement: 16 August 1878 (Note: Section 3.)

Other legislation
- Amends: Metropolitan Commons Amendment Act 1869; Commons Act 1876
- Amended by: Local Government Act 1894; Local Government Act 1972; Local Government Act 1985; Commons Act 2006

Status: Amended

Text of statute as originally enacted

Revised text of statute as amended

Text of the Metropolitan Commons Act 1878 as in force today (including any amendments) within the United Kingdom, from legislation.gov.uk.

The Metropolitan Commons Act 1878 (41 & 42 Vict. c. 71) is an act of the Parliament of the United Kingdom that amended the Metropolitan Commons Act 1866 (39 & 40 Vict. c. 56) and the Metropolitan Commons Amendment Act 1869(32 & 33 Vict. c. 107.

It is one of the Metropolitan Commons Acts 1866 to 1878.
