= Inclosure Act 1847 =

Act of the Parliament of the United Kingdom

Inclosure Act 1847 (Note: The citation of this act by this short title was authorised by section 1 of, and the first schedule to, the Short Titles Act 1896. Due to the repeal of those provisions it is now authorised by section 19(2) of the Interpretation Act 1978.)
- Act of Parliament
- Parliament of the United Kingdom
- Long title: An Act to extend the Provisions of the Act for the Inclosure and Improvement of Commons.
- Citation: 10 & 11 Vict. c. 111
- Territorial extent: United Kingdom

Dates
- Royal assent: 23 July 1847
- Commencement: 23 July 1847 (Note: The Acts of Parliament (Commencement) Act 1793.)

Other legislation
- Amends: Inclosure Act 1845
- Amended by: Statute Law Revision Act 1875; Statute Law Revision Act 1891; Statute Law (Repeals) Act 1998; Commons Act 2006

Status: Amended

Text of statute as originally enacted

Revised text of statute as amended

Text of the Inclosure Act 1847 as in force today (including any amendments) within the United Kingdom, from legislation.gov.uk.

The Inclosure Act 1847 (10 & 11 Vict. c. 111) is an act of the Parliament of the United Kingdom which amended the Inclosure Act 1845 (8 & 9 Vict. c. 118).

== Subsequent developments ==
Section 5, and the words "the said recited Act is repealed; and that" in section 10 of the act, were repealed by section 1 of, and the schedule to, the Statute Law Revision Act 1875 (38 & 39 Vict. c. 66), which came into force on 11 August 1875.

The words of enactment in the act were repealed by section 1 of, and the first schedule to, the Statute Law Revision Act 1891 (54 & 55 Vict. c. 67), which came into force on 5 August 1891.
