= Elegit =

Elegit (Latin for he has chosen) was, in English law, a judicial writ of execution, given by the Statute of Westminster II (1285), and so called from the words of the writ, that the plaintiff has chosen (elegit) this mode of satisfaction. Previously to the Statute of Westminster II, a judgment creditor could only have the profits of lands of a debtor in satisfaction of his judgment, but not the possession of the lands themselves. But this statute provided that henceforth it should be in the election of the party having recovered judgment to have a writ of fieri facias unto the sheriff on lands and goods or else all the chattels of the debtor and the one half of his lands until the judgment be satisfied. By the Bankruptcy Act 1883 the writ of elegit extended to lands and hereditaments only.

Writs of elegit were abolished on January 1, 1957, by the Administration of Justice Act 1956.
