= Commons Registration Act 1965 =

Act of the Parliament of the United Kingdom

Commons Registration Act 1965 (Note: Section 25(1).)
- Act of Parliament
- Parliament of the United Kingdom
- Long title: An Act to provide for the registration of common land and of town or village greens; to amend the law as to prescriptive claims to rights of common; and for purposes connected therewith.
- Citation: 1965 c. 64
- Territorial extent: England and Wales (Note: Section 25(3).)

Dates
- Royal assent: 5 August 1965
- Commencement: various (Note: Section 25(2).)

Other legislation
- Amended by: Ministry of Land and Natural Resources (Dissolution) Order 1967; Secretary of State for the Environment Order 1970; Local Government Act 1972; Local Government Act 1985; Countryside and Rights of Way Act 2000; Land Registration Act 2002; Commons Act 2006; Church of England (Miscellaneous Provisions) Measure 2006

Status: Amended

Text of statute as originally enacted

Revised text of statute as amended

Text of the Commons Registration Act 1965 as in force today (including any amendments) within the United Kingdom, from legislation.gov.uk.

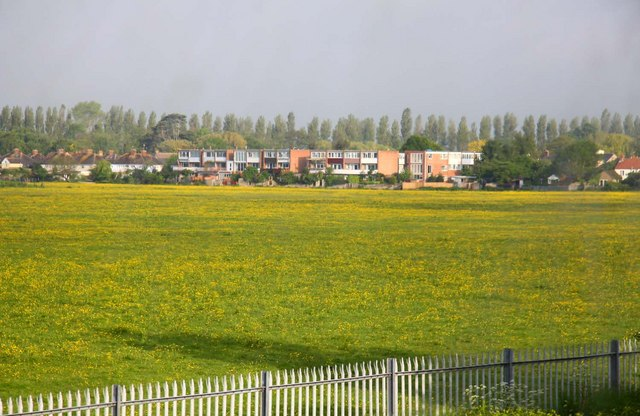
Wolvercote Common where the rights of villages in Wolvercote have been affected by the Commons Registration Act 1965.

The Commons Registration Act 1965 (c. 64) is an act of the Parliament of the United Kingdom enacted in 1965 that concerns the registration of rights to common land, town greens, and village greens in England and Wales. The legislation under the Harold Wilson government made reference to the Land Registration Act 1925 and Land Registration Act 1936.

The Countryside and Rights of Way Act 2000 and the Commons Act 2006, which gave new opportunities to register greens, amended the act.

== Registrations and losses ==
In the late 1960s, following the enactment of the Commons Registration Act 1965, the Open Spaces Society worked hard to register common land and common rights, in the three years allowed by the act. However, still many commons were lost through failure to register them. The act has reduced the historical rights of households that did not register under the act. For example, villages in Wolvercote north of Oxford used to have grazing rights on Wolvercote Common. However, since the act came into force, only those households that registered under the act now have this right.

Several hundred square kilometres of ‘waste land’ that was eligible for registration under the Commons Registration Act 1965 was not, in fact, finally registered. As a consequence, it ceased to be recognised as common land. A partial remedy for this defect in the earlier legislation is provided by the Commons Act 2006. Under schedule 2, 4 of the act, applications that failed under the original registration process may, in certain circumstances, be reconsidered – offering, in effect, a second chance for the land to be confirmed ('re-registered') as common. Land that is re-registered in this way will enjoy the special legal protection afforded to common land. It will also be subject to the public right of access introduced by the Countryside and Rights of Way Act 2000; or, may qualify as a section 193 'urban' common (in which case, it would also be subject to a right of access for horse-riders).

== Subsequent developments ==
The whole act was repealed by section 47(1) of, and part 3 of schedule 6 to, the Commons Act 2006. However, As of 2026 only parts of the act have been repealed.

== See also ==
- The common land and commoners of Ashdown Forest
- English land law
- List of acts of the Parliament of the United Kingdom
- Public service law in the United Kingdom
