= Commons Act 2006 =

Act of the Parliament of the United Kingdom

Commons Act 2006 (Note: Section 62.)
- Act of Parliament
- Parliament of the United Kingdom
- Long title: An Act to make provision about common land and town or village greens; and for connected purposes.
- Citation: 2006 c. 26
- Territorial extent: England and Wales (Note: Section 36.)

Dates
- Royal assent: 19 July 2006
- Commencement: Various (Note: Section 56.)
Other legislation
Amends	Gifts for Churches Act 1811; Schools Sites Act 1841; Inclosure Act 1845; Inclosure Act 1847; Literary and Scientific Institutions Act 1854; Inclosure Act 1857; Metropolitan Commons Act 1866; Commons Act 1876; Metropolitan Commons Act 1878; Commons Act 1899; Law of Property Act 1925; New Parishes Measure 1943; Countryside Act 1968; Animals Act 1971; Wildlife and Countryside Act 1981; Norfolk and Suffolk Broads Act 1988; Courts and Legal Services Act 1990; Judicial Pensions and Retirement Act 1993; Environment Act 1995; Countryside and Rights of Way Act 2000; Land Registration Act 2002; Constitutional Reform Act 2005
Repeals/revokes	Commons Act 1285; Commons Registration Act 1965
Amended by	Church of England (Miscellaneous Provisions) Measure 2010; Crime and Courts Act 2013; Growth and Infrastructure Act 2013; Natural Resources Body for Wales (Functions) Order 2013; Commons (Town and Village Greens) (Trigger and Terminating Events) Order 2014; Planning (Wales) Act 2015; Housing and Planning Act 2016; Housing and Planning Act 2016 (Permission in Principle etc) (Miscellaneous Amendments) (England) Regulations 2017; Church Property Measure 2018; Levelling-up and Regeneration Act 2023; Town and Country Planning (Fees and Consequential Amendments) Regulations 2025

Status: Amended

History of passage through Parliament

Text of statute as originally enacted

Revised text of statute as amended

The Commons Act 2006 (c. 26) is an act of the Parliament of the United Kingdom. It implements recommendations contained in the Common Land Policy Statement 2002.

The act sets out the provision for designation of town or village greens.

== Provisions ==
The act prevents the reregistration of common, where a landowner buys out the common right-holders' rights, unless the landowner can provide an equally good or better piece of land.

The act provides commons with further protections relating to over-grazing, abuse, encroachment and unauthorised development.

The act establishes statutory associations with the powers to regulate grazing and other agricultural activities.

=== Section 56 - Commencement ===
The following orders have been made under this section:

- The Commons Act 2006 (Commencement No. 1, Transitional Provisions and Savings) (England) Order 2006 (SI 2006/2504 (C. 84))
- The Commons Act 2006 (Commencement No. 2, Transitional Provisions and Savings) (England) Order 2007 (SI 2007/456 (C. 17))
- The Commons Act 2006 (Commencement No. 3, Transitional Provisions and Savings) (England) Order 2007 (SI 2007/2584 (C. 98))
- The Commons Act 2006 (Commencement No. 4 and Savings) (England) Order 2008 (SI 2008/1960 (C. 94))
- The Commons Act 2006 (Commencement No. 5) (England) Order 2010 (SI 2006/61 (C. 10))
- The Commons Act 2006 (Commencement No. 6) (England) Order 2011 (SI 2011/2460 (C. 88))
- The Commons Act 2006 (Commencement No. 1 and Savings (England and Wales) and Commencement No. 5 (England) (Amendment)) Order 2010 (SI 2010/2356 (C. 114))
- The Commons Act 2006 (Commencement No. 1, Transitional Provisions and Savings) (Wales) Order 2007 (SI 2007/2386 (W. 197) (C. 88))

== See also ==
- Commons Act
- Commons Registration Act 1965
- Countryside and Rights of Way Act 2000
