= Casu consimili =

UK writ of entry

Casu consimili was a writ of entry, where a tenant by courtesy, or for life, transfers property to another in fee or in tail, or for another's life.

Such writs were first introduced into mediaeval English law in 1285 in Statute of Westminster II. An example, dated 1412, can be viewed in the Plea Rolls of the Court of Common Pleas.
