= Common land =

Land owned collectively

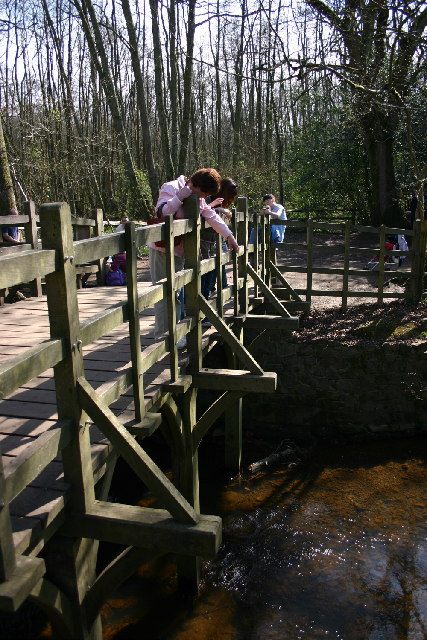
Poohsticks Bridge in Ashdown Forest, an area of common land

Common land is collective land in which all persons have certain common rights (although sometimes only those whose nation governs the land), such as to allow their livestock to graze upon it, to collect wood or water, or to cut turf for fuel. A person who has a right in, or over, common land jointly with another or others is usually called a commoner.

In Great Britain, common land or former common land is usually referred to as a common; for instance, Clapham Common and Mungrisdale Common. Due to enclosure, the extent of common land is now much reduced from the hundreds of square kilometres that existed until the 17th century, but a considerable amount of common land still exists, particularly in upland areas. There are over 8,000 registered commons in England alone.

== Origins ==
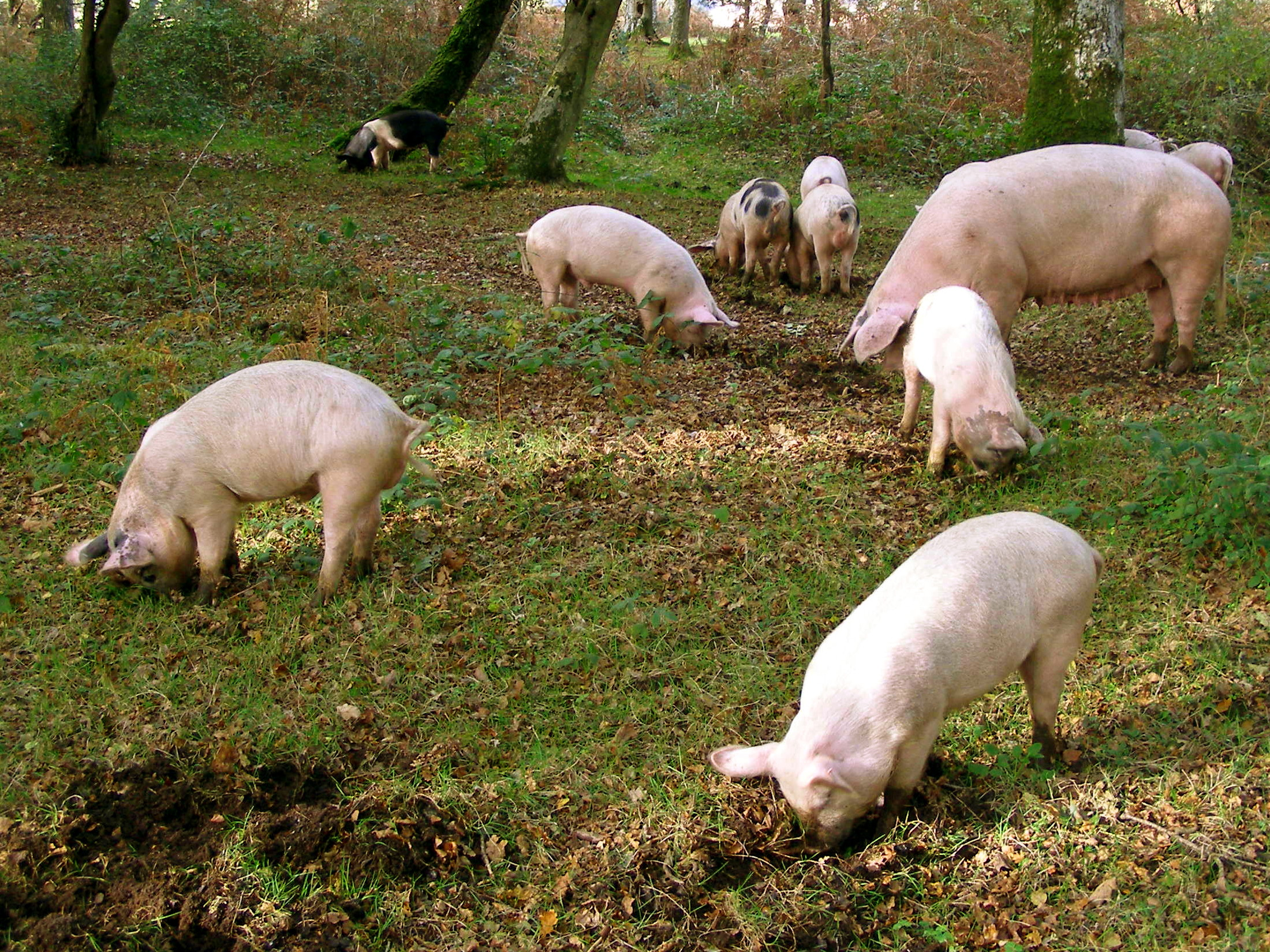
Modern-day pannage, or common of mast, in the New Forest

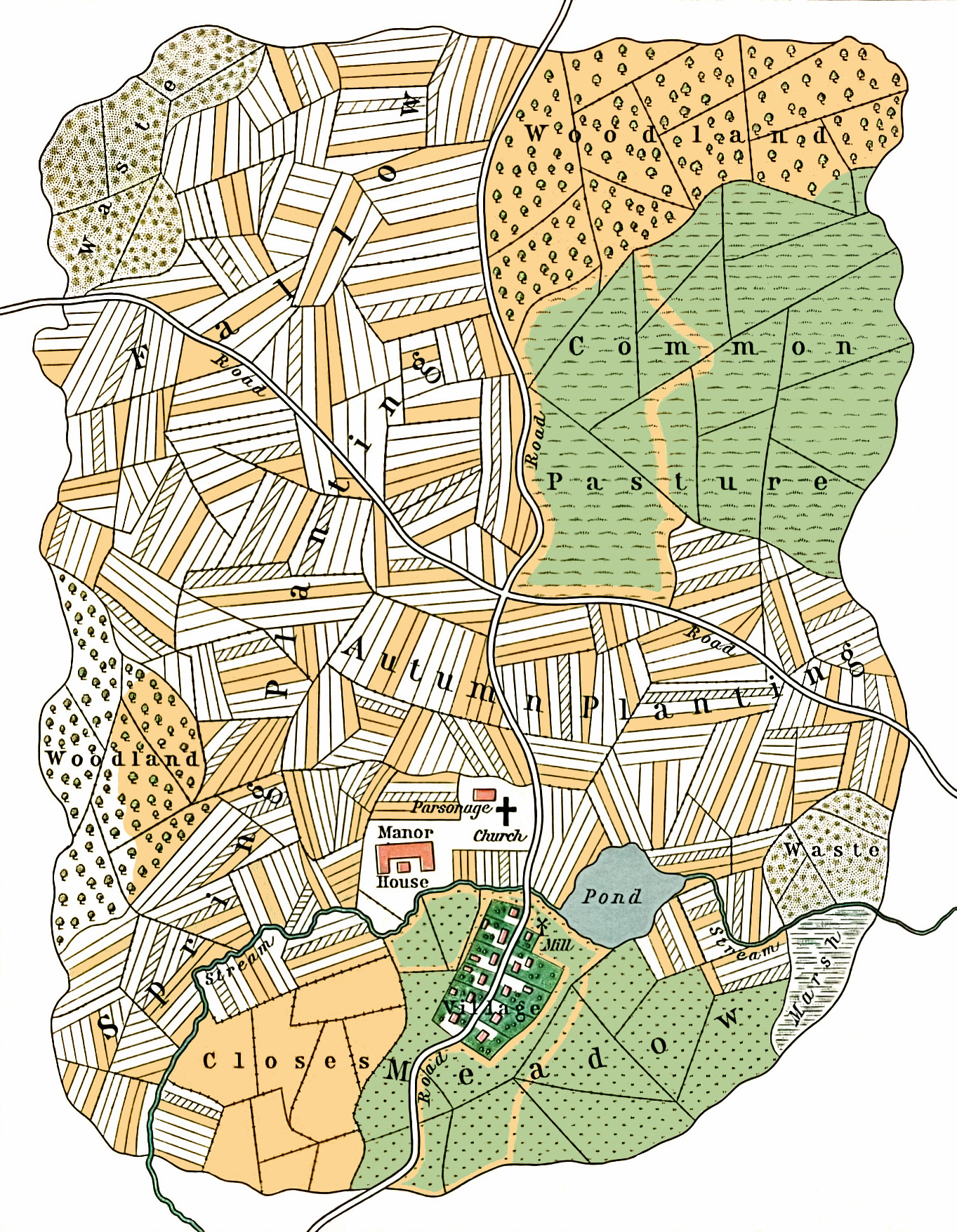
Conjectural map of a mediaeval English manor. The part allocated to "common pasture" is shown in the north-east section, shaded green.

Originally in medieval England the common was an integral part of the manor, and was thus part of the estate held by the lord of the manor under a grant from the Crown or a superior peer (who in turn held his land from the Crown; it is sometimes said that the Crown was held to ultimately own all land under its domain). This manorial system, founded on feudalism, granted rights of land use to different classes. These could be appurtenant rights whose ownership attached to tenancies of particular plots of land held within a manor. A commoner would be the person who, for the time being, was the occupier of a particular plot of land. Most land with appurtenant commons rights is adjacent to the common. Other rights of common were said to be in gross, that is, they were unconnected with tenure of land. This was more usual in regions where commons were more extensive, such as in the high ground of Northern England or in the Fens, but also included many village greens across England and Wales.

Historically manorial courts defined the details of many of the rights of common allowed to manorial tenants, and such rights formed part of the copyhold tenancy whose terms were defined in the manorial court roll.

Example rights of common are:

- Pasture. Right to pasture cattle, horses, sheep or other animals on the common land. The most widespread right.
- Piscary. Right to fish.
- Turbary. Right to take sods of turf for fuel.
- Common in the Soil. This is a general term used for rights to extract minerals such as sands, gravels, marl, walling stone and lime from common land.
- Mast or pannage. Right to turn out pigs for a period in autumn to eat mast (beech mast, acorns and other nuts).
- Estovers. Right to take sufficient wood for the commoner's house or holding; usually limited to smaller trees, bushes (such as gorse) and fallen branches.

On most commons, rights of pasture and pannage for each commoner are tightly defined by number and type of animal, and by the time of year when certain rights could be exercised. For example, the occupier of a particular cottage might be allowed to graze fifteen cattle, four horses, ponies or donkeys, and fifty geese, whilst the numbers allowed for their neighbours would probably be different. On some commons (such as the New Forest and adjoining commons), the rights are not limited by numbers, and instead a marking fee is paid each year for each animal turned out. However, if excessive use was made of the common, for example, in overgrazing, a common would be stinted, that is, a limit would be put on the number of animals each commoner was allowed to graze. These regulations were responsive to demographic and economic pressure. Thus rather than let a common become degraded, access was restricted even further.

The lord of the manor must only exercise his rights so far as to leave a "sufficiency" of resource for commoners. This was at issue in 1889 when the lord of the manor and owner of Banstead Downs and Heath, a Mr Hartopp, excavated gravel and threatened to reduce the available pasture. The meaning of sufficiency was challenged in court, expert witnesses stated that the grazing capacity was 1,200 animals, the commoners rights totalled 1,440 animals, and 600 animals were normally turned out. It was decided sufficiency was whether enough grazing would be available for all the animals that could be turned out. The judgment was that "The Lord is bound to leave pasture enough to satisfy the commoners rights whether such rights are to be exercised or not". Commoners also have the right to "peaceful enjoyment" of their rights, so that they cannot be hindered by the lord of the manor. This was first proposed in 1500 and became case law in 1827.

== Types of common ==
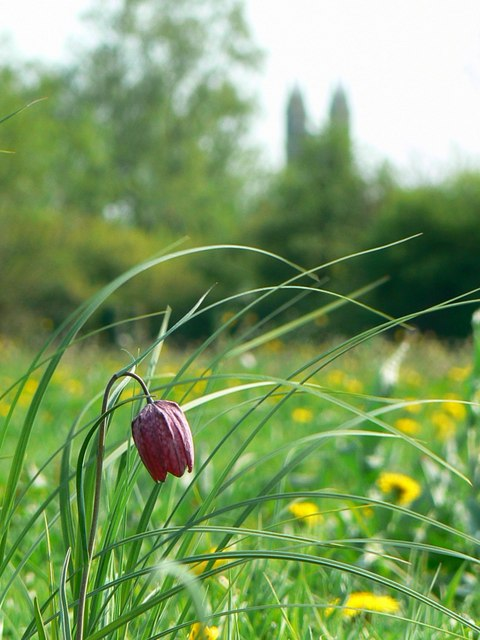
Snake's head fritillary, North Meadow, Cricklade. This is grazed as Lammas common land.

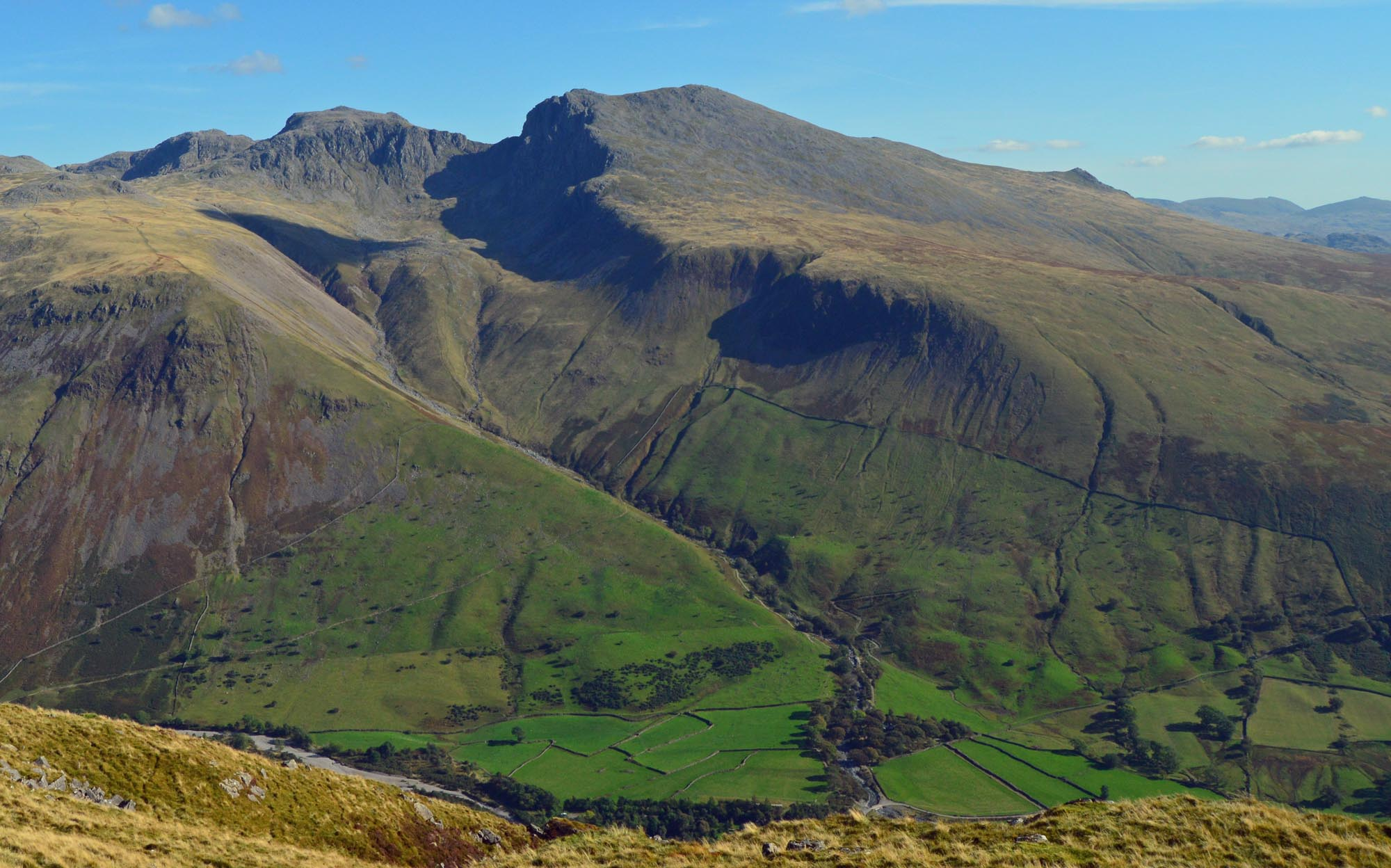
View of the Scafell massif from Yewbarrow, Wasdale, Cumbria. In the valley bottom are older enclosures and higher up on the fell-side are later enclosures on poorer land with substantial walls following boundary lines regardless of terrain. Above those is the unenclosed common land.

=== Pasture commons ===
Pasture commons are those where the primary right is to pasture livestock. In the uplands, they are largely moorland, on the coast they may be salt marsh, sand dunes or cliffs, and on inland lowlands they may be downland, grassland, heathland or wood pasture, depending on the soil and history. These habitats are often of very high nature conservation value, because of their very long continuity of management extending in some cases over many hundreds of years. In the past, most pasture commons would have been grazed by mixtures of cattle, sheep and ponies (often also geese). The modern survival of grazing on pasture commons over the past century is uneven.

The use of hefting (or heafing) – the characteristic of some breeds of sheep for example, keeping to a certain heft (a small local area) throughout their lives – allows different farmers in an extensive landscape such as moorland to graze different areas without the need for fences while maintaining their effective individual interest in them, as each ewe remains on her particular area. Lambs usually learn their heft from their mothers. Also known as 'hoofing' in some areas like North Yorkshire. This ability to keep sheep from straying without fences is still an important factor in sheep farming on the extensive common land in upland areas.

=== Arable and haymeadow commons ===
Surviving commons are almost all pasture, but in earlier times, arable farming and haymaking were significant, with strips of land in the common arable fields and common haymeadows assigned annually by lot. When not in use for those purposes, such commons were grazed. Examples include the common arable fields around the village of Laxton in Nottinghamshire, and a common meadow at North Meadow, Cricklade.

=== Lammas rights ===
Lammas rights entitled commoners to pasture following the harvest, between Lammas day, 12 August (N.S.), to 6 April, even if they did not have other rights to the land. Such rights sometimes had the effect of preventing enclosure and building development on agricultural land.

== Enclosure and decline ==
Most of the medieval common land of England was lost due to enclosure. In English social and economic history, enclosure or inclosure (Note: Inclosure and Enclosure are commonly interchangeable terms but have two distinct meanings. Inclosure is the statutory and legal form of the word "enclosure" in reference to the inclosure of land. Enclosure is the process.)is the process which ends traditional rights such as mowing meadows for hay, or grazing livestock on common land formerly held in the open field system. Once enclosed, these uses of the land become restricted to the owner, and it ceases to be land for the use of commoners. In England and Wales the term is also used for the process that ended the ancient system of arable farming in open fields. Under enclosure, such land is fenced (enclosed) and deeded or entitled to one or more owners. The process of enclosure began to be a widespread feature of the English agricultural landscape during the 16th century. By the 19th century, unenclosed commons had become largely restricted to large areas of rough pasture in mountainous areas and to relatively small residual parcels of land in the lowlands.

Enclosure could be accomplished by buying the ground rights and all common rights to accomplish exclusive rights of use, which increased the value of the land. The other method was by passing laws causing or forcing enclosure, such as Parliamentary enclosure. The latter process of enclosure was sometimes accompanied by force, resistance, and bloodshed, and remains among the most controversial areas of agricultural and economic history in England.

Enclosure is considered one of the causes of the British Agricultural Revolution. Enclosed land was under control of the farmer who was free to adopt better farming practices. There was widespread agreement in contemporary accounts that profit making opportunities were better with enclosed land. Following enclosure, crop yields and livestock output increased while at the same time productivity increased enough to create a surplus of labour. The increased labour supply is considered one of the factors facilitating the Industrial Revolution.

Following the era of enclosure, there was relatively little common land remaining of value although some residual commoners remained until the end of the Second World War. By that time lowland commons had become neglected because the commoners were able to find better-paid work in other sectors of the economy. As a result they largely stopped exercising their rights; relatively few commoners exist today.

== Modern use ==
Much common land is still used for its original purpose. The right to graze domestic stock is by far the most extensive commoners right registered, and its ongoing use contributes significantly to agricultural and rural economies. Rights to graze sheep are registered on 53% of the Welsh and 16% of the English commons. Cattle are registered on 35% of Welsh and 20% of English commons, whilst horses and ponies are registered on 27% of Welsh and 13% of English commons. In some cases rights to graze goats, geese and ducks are registered, whilst in others the type of livestock is not specified. These figures relate to the number of common land units, and due to discrepancies in the registers and large numbers of small commons with no rights in England, the apparent distinction between Wales and England may be exaggerated.

Today, despite the diverse legal and historical origins of commons, they are managed through a community of users, comprising those who hold rights together with the owner(s) of the soil. Such communities generally require joint working to integrate all interests, with formal or informal controls and collaborative understandings, often coupled with strong social traditions and local identity.

However, 26% of commons in Wales, and as many as 65% in England, have no common rights shown on the registers. Such areas are derived from wastes of manors, where rights probably existed formerly. When such open habitats are no longer grazed they revert to scrub and then dense woodland, losing the grassy or heathland vegetation which may have occupied the land continuously for many centuries. In 2007, Ashdown Forest, the Sussex heathland which was the setting for the Winnie-the-Pooh stories, became the centre of a dispute between some local residents and the forest's governing body, the Board of Conservators, which is responsible for administering the forest's 24 km^{2} of common land. The conservators wished to restore the forest's landscape to one that predominantly consisted of heathland—its defining characteristic until the mid-twentieth century, but something that was in danger of being lost after the Second World War as a result of the advance of woodland into traditional heathland areas when, as one commentator stated:

...returning soldiers gave up trying to scratch a living out of the forest. Whereas once hundreds of commoners used the wood and heath—their livestock obliging by chewing down young tree shoots—today there is only one commercial grazer.

The conservators were forced to intervene to stem the invasion of trees, scrub and bracken that threatened the ecologically precious heathlands, cutting down saplings, removing scrub and mowing the bracken. Some residents complained that the results looked like a First World War battle field. This is not a problem restricted to this common, but according to Jonathan Brown writing in the Independent on 21 April 2007 "similar debates are raging between locals and the authorities at other heathland areas in the New Forest and Surrey".

In 2008 the Foundation for Common Land was created in the UK to try to enhance the understanding and protection of commons.

== Governing law in England and Wales ==
The legal position concerning common land has been confused, but recent legislation has sought to remedy this and remove the legal uncertainties so that commons can be better used and protected.

Most commons are based on ancient rights under British common law, which pre-date statutes passed by the Parliament of England. The exact usufruct rights which apply to individual commons were in some cases documented, but more often were based on long-held traditions. A major reform began in 1965, with a national register of common land which recorded the land ownership and the rights of any commoners, and two other important statutes have followed.

Owners of land in general have all the rights of exclusive ownership, to use the land as they wish. However, for common land the owner's rights are restricted, and other people known as commoners have certain rights over the land. The landowner may retain other rights to the land, such as rights to minerals and large timber, and to any common rights left unexercised by the commoners. The commoners will continue to exercise their rights, or have a document which describes their rights, which may be part of the deeds of another property. A number of commoners still exercise rights, for example, there are 500 practising commoners in the New Forest, and there is a federation of commoners in Cumbria. In many cases commons have no existing commoners, the rights having been neglected.

=== Erection of Cottages Act 1588 ===
It was a common a belief that if a squatter and their friends could—between sunrise and sunset in a single day—build a house on common land, raise the roof over their head and light a fire in the hearth, then they would have the right of undisturbed possession. The belief—sometimes called "keyhole tenure", and which persisted as recently as the early 20th century—was actually a fallacy, but to stop landless peasants unlawfully squatting on commons, the Erection of Cottages Act 1588 (31 Eliz. 1. c. 7) was introduced.

=== Commons Act 1876 ===
Commons Act 1876 (Note: Section 1.)
- Act of Parliament
- Parliament of the United Kingdom
- Long title: An Act for facilitating the regulation and improvement of Commons, and for amending the Acts relating to the Inclosure of Commons.
- Citation: 39 & 40 Vict. c. 56
- Territorial extent: United Kingdom

Dates
- Royal assent: 11 August 1876
- Commencement: 11 August 1876 (Note: The Acts of Parliament (Commencement) Act 1793.)
Other legislation
Amends	Inclosure Act 1845
Amended by	Metropolitan Commons Act 1878; Statute Law Revision Act 1894; Local Government Act 1933; Administration of Justice (Appeals) Act 1934; Charities (Fuel Allotments) Act 1939; Statute Law Revision Act 1953; Charities Act 1960; Criminal Justice Act 1967; Decimal Currency Act 1969; Statute Law (Repeals) Act 1977; Local Government, Planning and Land Act 1980; Criminal Justice Act 1982; Statute Law (Repeals) Act 1989; Statute Law (Repeals) Act 1998; Courts Act 2003; Constitutional Reform Act 2005; Commons Act 2006; Crime and Courts Act 2013

Status: Amended

Text of statute as originally enacted

Text of the Commons Act 1876 as in force today (including any amendments) within the United Kingdom, from legislation.gov.uk.

Under the Commons Act 1876 (39 & 40 Vict. c. 56) some 36 commons in England and Wales were regulated. The act also enabled the confirmation of orders providing for the inclosure of common land or common fields.

=== Commons Act 1899 ===
Commons Act 1899 (Note: Section 24.)
- Act of Parliament
- Parliament of the United Kingdom
- Long title: An Act to amend the Inclosure Acts 1845 to 1882 and the Law relating to Commons and Open Spaces.
- Citation: 62 & 63 Vict. c. 30
- Territorial extent: United Kingdom

Dates
- Royal assent: 9 August 1899
- Commencement: 9 August 1899
Other legislation
Amends	Inclosure Act 1845
Repeals/revokes	Inclosure Act 1756; Inclosure Act 1757; Inclosure (Consolidation) Act 1801; Inclosure Act 1821; Common Fields Exchange Act 1834; Inclosure Act 1836; Inclosure Act 1840
Amended by	Statute Law Revision Act 1883; Open Spaces Act 1906; Statute Law Revision Act 1908; Local Government Act 1933; Statute Law Revision Act 1963; Commons Act 2006

Status: Amended

Text of statute as originally enacted

Text of the Commons Act 1899 as in force today (including any amendments) within the United Kingdom, from legislation.gov.uk.

The Commons Act 1899 (62 & 63 Vict. c. 30) provides a mechanism of enabling district councils and National Park authorities to manage commons where their use for exercise and recreation is the prime consideration and where the owner and commoners do not require a direct voice in the management, or where the owner cannot be found. There are at least 200 schemes of management made under the 1899 act.

=== Law of Property Act 1925 ===
The Law of Property Act 1925 (15 & 16 Geo. 5. c. 20), which still forms the core of English property law, has two provisions for common land:

- Section 193 gave the right of the public to "air and exercise" on metropolitan commons and those in pre-1974 urban districts and boroughs. This constituted about one fifth of the commons, but the 1925 act did not give this right to commons in essentially rural areas (although some urban districts had remarkably rural extent, such as the Lakes Urban District), which had to wait for the Countryside and Rights of Way Act 2000.
- Section 194 restricted the inclosure of commons, which would now require Ministerial consent.

=== Commons Registration Act 1965 ===
The UK government regularised the definitions of common land with the Commons Registration Act 1965 (c. 64), which established a register of common land.

Not all commons have owners, but all common land by definition is registered under Commons Registration Act 1965, along with the rights of any commoners if they still exist. The registration authorities are the county councils, and when there is no ownership, a local council, such as a parish council is normally given guardianship by vesting the property under section 8 the act.

An online database of registered common land was compiled by DEFRA in 1992–93 as part of a survey of the condition and wildlife of commons. The official up to date registers of common land are held by the commons registration authorities.

The following registration information is held:

- Land Section

This includes a description of the land, who applied to register the land, and when the land became finally registered. There are also related plans which show the boundaries of the land.

- Rights Section

This includes a description of the rights of common (e.g. a right to graze a certain number of sheep), the area of common over which the right is exercisable, the name of the holder of the right and whether the right is attached to land in the ownership of the holder of the right (the commoner) or is a right held in gross i.e. unattached to land.

- Ownership Section

This includes details of the owner(s) of the common land. Entries in this section however, are not held to be conclusive.

Numerous inconsistencies and irregularities remained, mainly because a period of only three years was given for registration submissions. However, there is now an opportunity to clear these up under the 2006 act, and to add land omitted under the 1965 act.

=== Countryside and Rights of Way Act 2000 ===
Other than for those commons covered by the Law of Property Act 1925, the Commons Act 1899 and certain other statutes, the public did not have the right to use or enjoy common land if they were not a commoner. However, the Countryside and Rights of Way Act 2000 (c. 37) gave the public the freedom to roam freely on all registered common land in England and Wales. The new rights were introduced region by region through England and Wales, with completion in 2005. Maps showing accessible areas have been produced, and are available online as "open access maps" produced by Natural England. Commons are included in the public access land now shown on the Ordnance Survey Explorer maps.

=== Commons Act 2006 ===
The Commons Act 2006 (c. 26) is an important recent piece of legislation.

The act:

- Enables commons to be managed more sustainably by commoners and landowners working together through commons councils with powers to regulate grazing and other agricultural activities
- Provides better protection for common land and greens – this includes reinforcing existing protections against abuse, encroachment and unauthorised development
- Recognises that the protection of common land has to be proportionate to the harm caused and that some specified works can be carried out without the need for consent
- Requires commons registration authorities to bring their registers up-to-date by recording past changes affecting the registers during a 'transitional period', and to keep the registers up-to-date by recording new changes affecting the registers – commons registration authorities will have new powers to correct many of the mistakes in the registers
- Sets out new, clearer criteria for the registration of town or village greens
- Prohibits the severance of rights of common grazing, preventing commoners from selling, leasing or letting their rights away from the property to which rights are attached, though temporary severance of such rights is permitted for renewable terms of up to two years (in England) and five years (in Wales).

Several hundred square kilometres of 'waste land' that was provisionally registered under the Commons Registration Act 1965 was not, in fact, finally registered. As a consequence, it ceased to be recognised as common land. A partial remedy for this defect in the earlier legislation is provided by the Commons Act 2006. Under Schedule 2(4) to the Act, applications that failed to achieve final registration under the 1965 Act may, in certain circumstances, be reconsidered – offering, in effect, a second chance for the land to be confirmed ('re-registered') as common. Land that is re-registered in this way will enjoy the special legal protection afforded to common land. It will also become subject in due course to the public right of access introduced by the Countryside and Rights of Way Act 2000; or depending on location, may qualify as a section 193 'urban' common (in which case, it would also be subject to a right of access for horse-riders).

== Management ==
=== Fencing ===
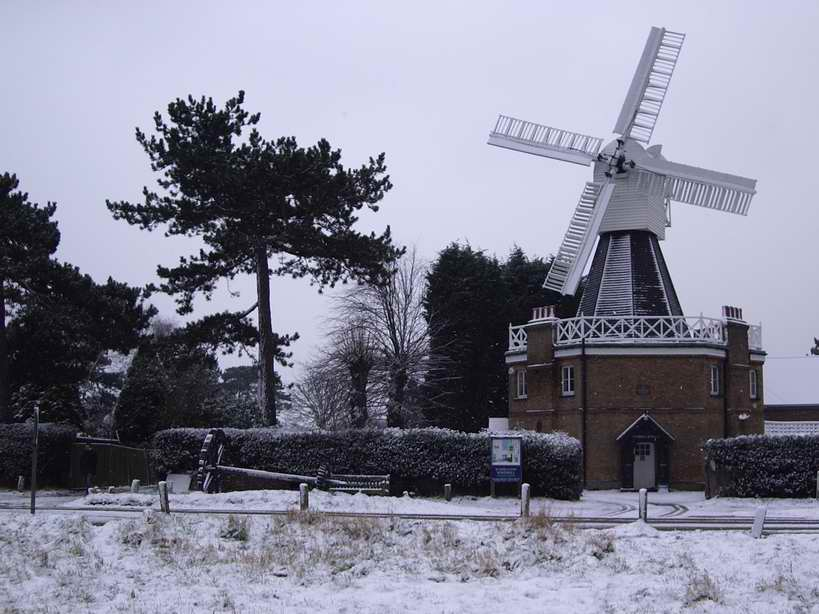
The windmill on Wimbledon Common

The act of transferring resources from the commons to purely private ownership is known as enclosure, or (especially in formal use, and in place names) Inclosure. The inclosure acts were a series of private acts of Parliament, mainly from about 1750 to 1850, which enclosed large areas of common, especially the arable and haymeadow land and the better pasture land.

The maintenance of fences around a common is the responsibility of the occupiers of the adjacent enclosed land, not (as it would be with enclosed land) the responsibility of the owners of the grazed livestock. This can lead to difficulties where not all adjacent occupiers maintain their fences properly. However the fencing of land within a registered common is not allowed, as this is a form of enclosure and denies use of the land to others.

A celebrated landmark case of unauthorised fencing of a common was in 1866 by Lord Brownlow who illegally enclosed 434 acres of Berkhamsted Common to add to his Ashridge Estate. Brownlow had failed to buy out the commoners, so resorted to this action. A public outcry followed, and the Commons Preservation Society found a champion in Augustus Smith who had the inclination and the money to act, and himself held commons rights. Smith hired 120 navvies armed with hammers, chisels and crowbars, who on the night of 6 March 1866, under the aegis of the newly formed Commons Preservation Society (now the Open Spaces Society), felled to the ground two miles of iron railings. Soon after, local people flocked in. Lord Brownlow took action against Augustus Smith and the court case lasted until 1870 when it ended with the complete vindication of Smith.

=== Controls on development ===
Development of common land is strictly controlled. The government states that common land should be open and accessible to the public, and the law restricts the kind of works that can be carried out on commons. HM Planning Inspectorate is responsible for determining applications under the 2006 Act regarding common land in England, and several other pieces of legislation regarding commons and greens. All applications are determined on behalf of the Secretary of State for the Environment, Food and Rural Affairs (Defra).

Under section 38 of the Commons Act 2006, consent is required to carry out any restricted works on land registered as common land under the Commons Registration Act 1965. Restricted works are any that prevent or impede access to or over the land. They include fencing, buildings, structures, ditches, trenches, embankments and other works, where the effect of those works is to prevent or impede access. They also include, in every case, new solid surfaces, such as for a new car park or access road.

=== Boards of conservators and commons councils ===
Some commons are managed by boards of conservators for the wider public benefit. However, for areas where these are not established, or an improved system is required, the Commons Act 2006 provides for the establishment of commons councils to manage common land.

The Standard Constitution Regulations relating to commons councils were formally approved in April 2010, and commons councils are most likely to be useful where they can improve current management practices. This may be where commons are in agricultural use, but where it can be difficult to reach agreement on collective management. Commons councils are voluntary and can be established only where there is substantial support among those with interests in the land, such as; the commoners (especially those who actively exercise their rights); owners and other legal interests.

Commons councils enable decisions to be made by majority voting, so relieving the burden of trying to reach unanimous decisions. They will have the power to make rules about agricultural activities, the management of vegetation, and the exercise of common rights, which are binding on all those with interests on a common.

=== Roadways ===
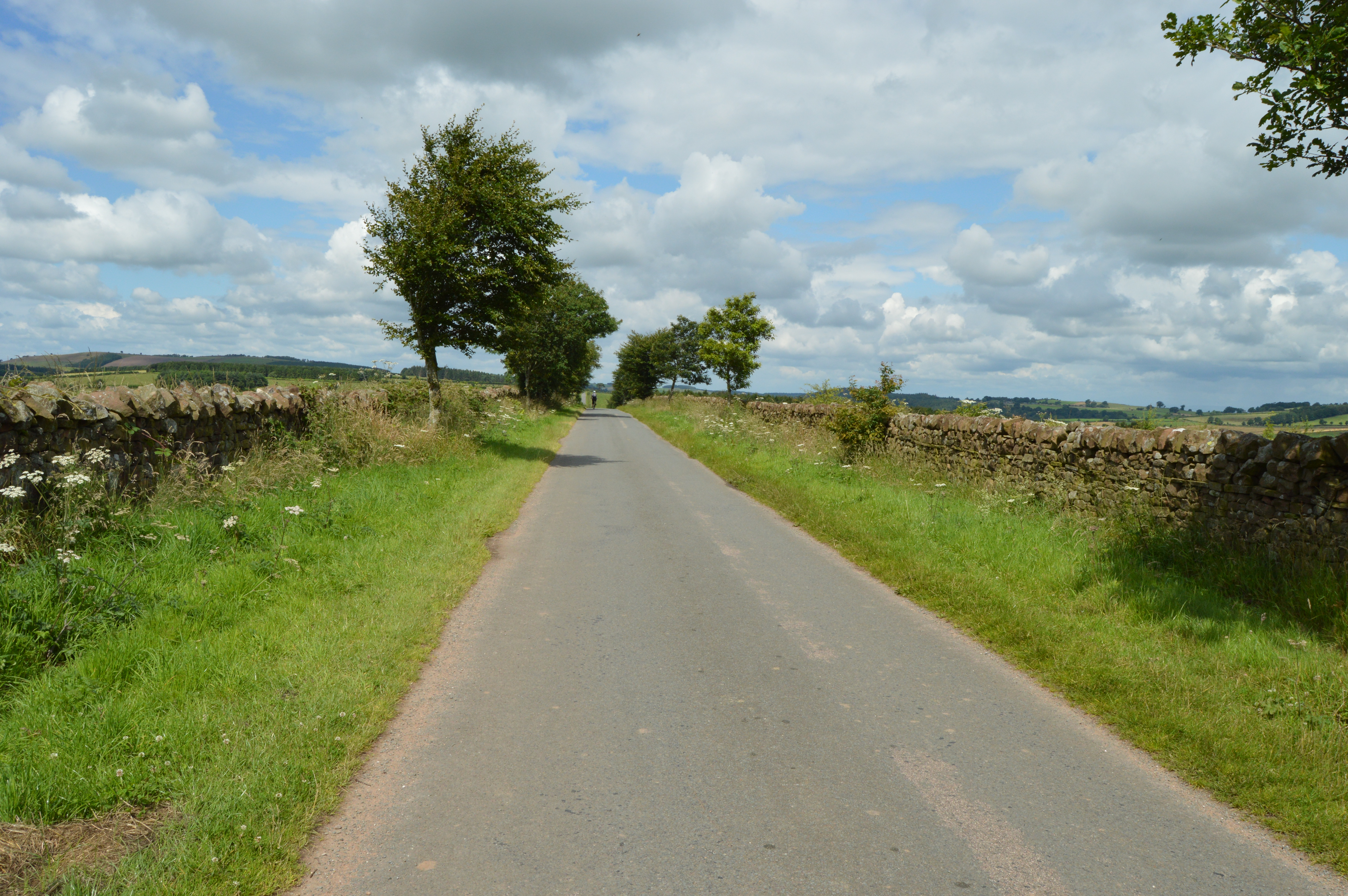
A parliamentary enclosure road near Lazonby in Cumbria. The roads were made as straight as possible, and the boundaries much wider than a cart width to reduce the ground damage of driving sheep and cattle.

Commons are often crossed by unfenced public roads, and this leads to another problem on modern pasture commons where grazing survives (or is to be reintroduced). Historically, the roads would have been cart-tracks, and there would have been no conflict between their horse-drawn (or ox-drawn) traffic and the pastured animals, and no great difficulty if pastured animals wandered off the common along the roads. However, these roads now have fast motorised traffic which does not mix safely with animals. To continue (or restore) grazing, such roads may need fencing or at least blocking at the edge of the common with cattle grids – however fencing a common is reminiscent of the process of enclosure, historically fatal to its survival, and permission for fencing on a common is a strictly controlled process within the UK planning system.

Public roads through enclosed common land were made to an accepted width between boundaries. In the late eighteenth century this was at least 60 feet (18 m), but from the 1790s this was decreased to 40 feet (12 m), and later 30 feet (9.1 m) as the normal maximum width. The reason for these wide roads was to prevent excessive churning of the road bed, and allow easy movement of flocks and herds of animals.

== Finland and Sweden ==
A partition unit is a corporation that owns common land. In this case, the land is not state-owned or in joint-ownership under a trust, but is owned by a definite partition unit, a legal partnership whose partners are the participating individual landowners. Common lands and waterways owned by a partition unit were created by an agreement where certain land was reserved for the common use of all adjacent landowners. For the most part, this was due to the Great Partition (Swedish: storskiftet, Finnish: isojako), which started in 1757 and was largely complete by the 1800s. Earlier, the land of a village was divided into narrow stripes of farmland for each to own in an open-field system, with the remainder commonly owned. Work on the land was collective. In the Great Partition, villages were organized as corporations termed partition units (Swedish: skifteslag, Finnish: jakokunta), and land was divided into large chunks that were divided among the households (commoners) for individual cultivation and habitation. Land or waterways that remained undivided was kept by the partition unit as commons, owned by the partition unit. Later, Gustav III claimed the yet unclaimed forest for the Crown – this was the origin of the large forest holdings of the state in Sweden and Finland. Today, partition units are a common way of owning waterways.

== Ireland ==
In Ireland, commonage (Irish: cimíneacht, cimín) is a holding held by two or more persons in specified shares or jointly and originally purchased from the Irish Land Commission under the Land Purchase Acts (1885 and 1903). Traditionally, tenants on large estates rented their land from the landlord. The farm consisted of an enclosed parcel of land and permission to use nearby unenclosed land belonging to the landlord. In many areas access unenclosed land (the "hill") was vital as it allowed the tenant to keep livestock and gain a cash income.

There are over 4,500 commonages in Ireland, with 11,000–14,000 farmers having grazing rights. 4,260 square kilometres (1,640 sq mi; 1,050,000 acres) of commonage is currently grazed, mostly in counties Mayo, Galway, Sligo, Donegal, Kerry and Wicklow. It is generally used for grazing sheep in upland areas. Overgrazing in the 1980s and 1990s led to damage to hill areas and river banks; numbers are now limited.

In Gaelic Ireland, prior to the Norman-English conquest of Ireland (begun in the 12th century AD, not complete until the late 16th century), land was owned by tribes. A portion of the tribe's territory, known as the Fearan Fine ("tribe's quarter") was held in common by the entire tribe. This was generally low-quality land, used for grazing pigs and cattle, and was leased to tribe members for a year at a time.

== Scotland ==
Commoning has probably existed in Scotland for over a millennium. However, there is no modern legislation relating to commons which formally identifies the extent of common land or clarifies the full range of rights. The right of turbary – the ability to cut peat as fuel – clearly exists in large parts of Scotland, whilst the scale of such rights, and the extent to which they are utilised, remain unknown. The main work undertaken on Scottish commons concerns grazing, using a pragmatic definition, where such commons were defined as pastures with multiple grazing rights and/or multiple graziers.

There are seven main historic types of common land in Scotland, some of which have similarities to common land in England and Wales.

=== Commonties ===
The overwhelming majority of areas of common land in lowland Scotland and the Highland fringes were commonties. A commonty is an area of land where the rights of property or use are shared by two or more neighbouring (though not necessarily adjacent) landowners. They are not therefore truly 'common' land in the sense that anyone can use them, and this distinction meant that it was often very easy for commonties to be divided between landowners after a series of Acts permitting this were passed by the Parliament of Scotland in the 17th century, most notably the 1695 Act for the Division of Commonties. As a result, the number of commonties declined very rapidly in the 18th and 19th centuries.

=== Common mosses ===
Common mosses were areas of bog where the right to dig peat for fuel were shared by neighbouring landowners. They are therefore similar to commonties and most commonties included a common moss. However the difficulties of dividing such wet areas meant that they were left out of many commonty divisions and many common mosses may still survive, un-noticed because of the decline of peat-cutting.

=== Run rig ===
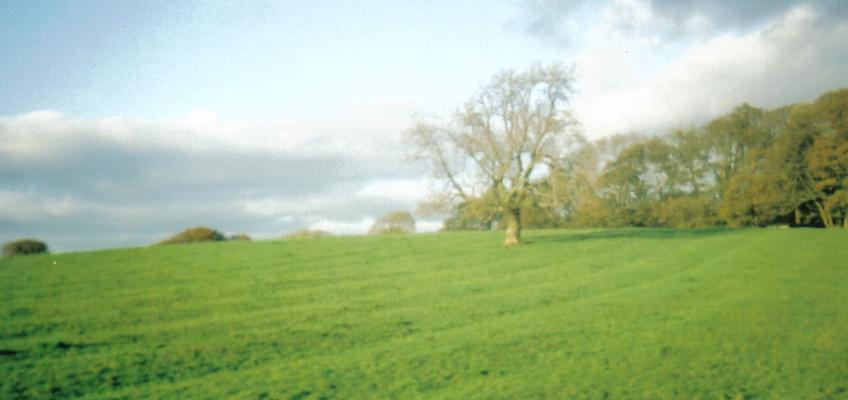
Rig and furrow marks at Buchans Field, Wester Kittochside

Run rig is a system of agriculture involving the cultivation of adjacent, narrow strips of raised land (rigs). Traditionally adjacent rigs would be used by different farmers and the rigs were periodically re-allocated between them. The system was common throughout Scotland until the 18th century, but survived longer in the Western Highlands, where runrig was often associated with an adjacent area of common hill grazing which was also shared by the same farmers as the runrig.

=== Scattalds ===
Scattalds are unique to Shetland and are based on udal law, rather than the feudal law that predominated in the rest of Scotland. However, Scattalds are very similar to commonties and many were divided under the same 1695 Act that allowed for the division of commonties.

=== Crown Commons ===
Crown Commons were areas of land held directly by the crown and therefore the common rights that could be used were rights of use rather than rights of property. Unlike commonties, the rights to use crown commons (for example for grazing livestock) were available to anyone, not just the neighbouring landowners. There are no crown commons left in Scotland; those that survived into the 20th century were taken over by the Crown Estate.

=== Greens and loans ===
Greens were small areas of common land near a settlement where livestock could be kept overnight, markets held and other communal activities carried out. Sometimes they were adjacent to drovers' roads near river crossing points or overnight accommodation. Most were genuinely common land with only the Crown holding any title to them. A loan was a common route through private property allowing access to an area of common land or other public place. As the traditional uses of greens and loans declined, they were often absorbed by the neighbouring landowners.

=== Burgh commons ===
Burgh commons were areas of common land where property rights or privileges of use were held by the burgh for their inhabitants. They could include any of the other six types of common land and were sometimes shared with landowners outside the burgh. By the early 19th century, most burgh commons had been appropriated by the wealthy landowners who dominated burgh councils, and very few have survived.

== United States ==
Common land, an English development, was used in many former British colonies, for example in Ireland and the United States. The North American colonies adopted the English laws in establishing their own commons. Famous examples include the Boston Common in Massachusetts and the New Haven Green in New Haven, Connecticut, some of the oldest commons in the United States.

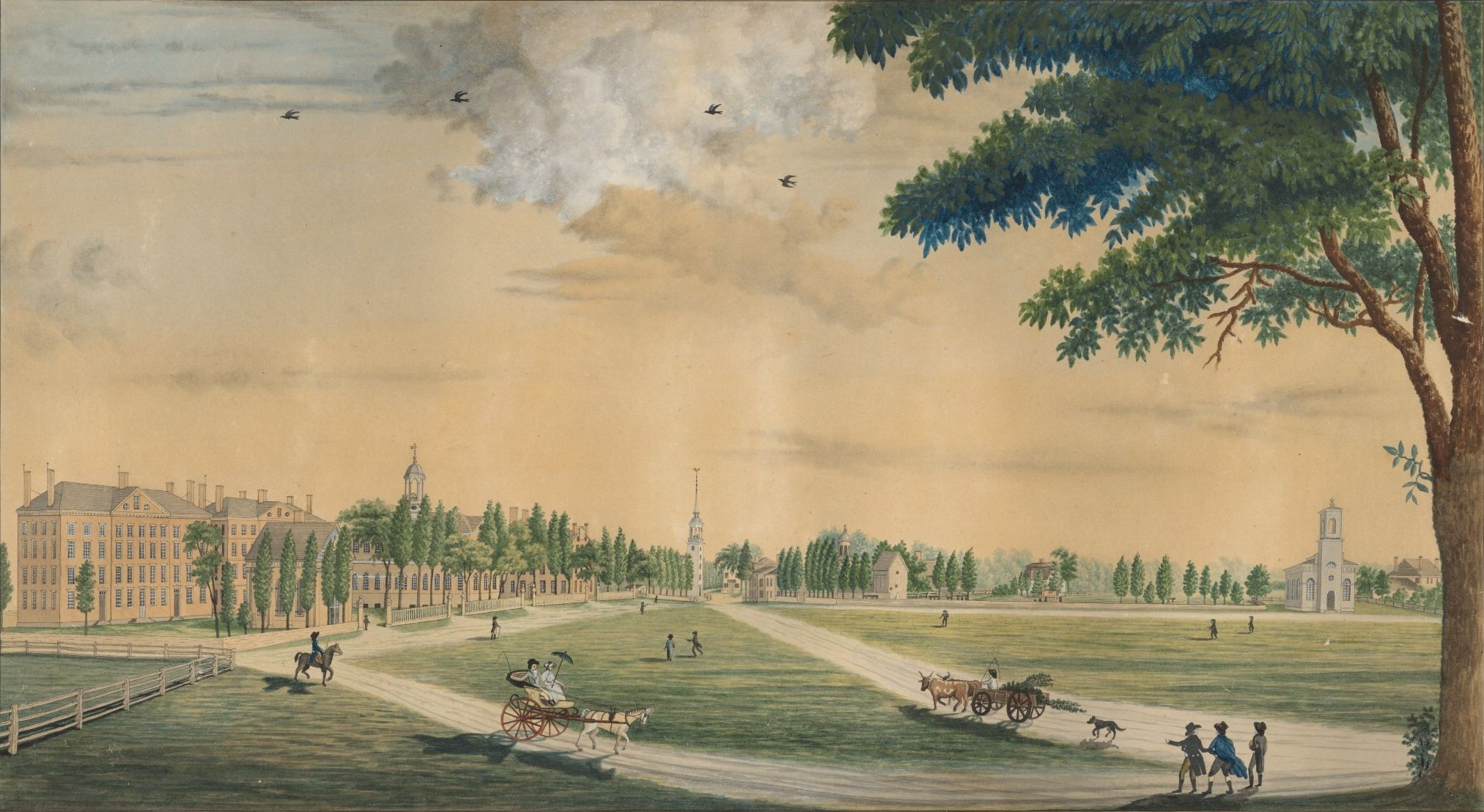
Cambridge Common, c. 1808–9, with Harvard College at left and Christ Church at right

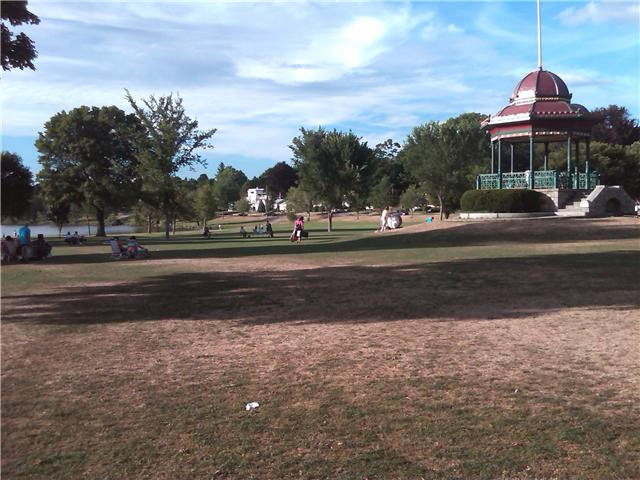
Wakefield, Massachusetts, town common showing bandstand at right and lake at left

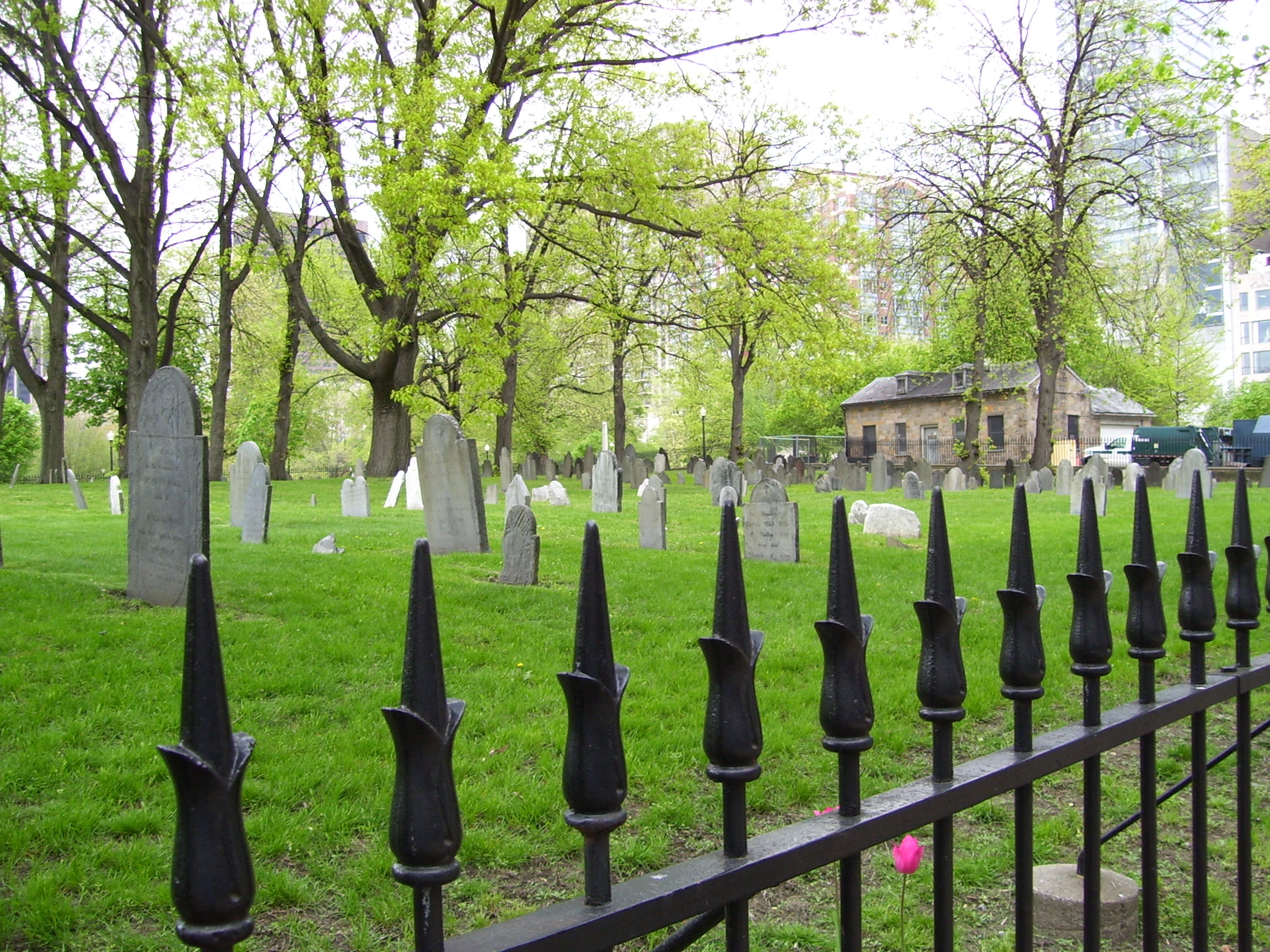
Central Burying Ground on the Boston Common in Boston, Massachusetts

== Switzerland ==
In Switzerland, common land (German: Allmend; French: biens communaux) formed a distinct third economic zone alongside arable fields and farmsteads in the typical village economy, and played a central role in rural life from the Middle Ages until the liberal reforms of the nineteenth century. The system governed access to shared pastures, forests, and waterways, with defined user communities holding graduated rights to exploit them. Usage rights were progressively narrowed in the early modern period as population growth put pressure on resources, and large-scale commons divisions occurred from the fifteenth century onward. The Helvetic Republic (1798–1803) formally separated political municipalities from user associations, accelerating the dissolution of the traditional system.

Institutional descendants survive in parts of Switzerland today in the form of Bürgergemeinden, Korporationen, and alpine cooperatives. The village of Törbel in the canton of Valais, which had collectively managed its meadows, forests, and water channels since 1483, was used as a central case study by Elinor Ostrom in her Nobel Prize-winning work Governing the Commons (1990).

== See also ==
- Agrarian Justice by Thomas Paine
- Alqueria
- Commune
- Commons
- Crown land
- English land law
- Exmoor
- Georgism
- Homeowner associations (often associated with common-interest developments)
- Kibbutz
- Leyton Marsh and Leicester Square in London, historically lammas land
- Moshav
- Public land
- Original Appropriation
- Rights of way in England and Wales
- Royal forest
- Satoyama
- Tragedy of the commons
- Trespass to land

=== Historical movements in defence of English commons ===
- The Diggers
- The Levellers

== Sources ==
- Bathe, Graham (2015) Common Land Pitkin
- Brown, Jonathan (21 April 2007), "Oh bother! Nimbies do battle with council over Pooh's forest", The Independent, archived from the original on 7 June 2008 (section: This Britain)
- Clayden, Paul (2007) Our Common Land. Open Spaces Society
- Gadsden, G.D.,(1988) The Law of Commons. Sweet and Maxwell. See also Cousins, E.F. & Honey, R. (2012) Gadsden on Commons and Greens. Sweet & Maxwell
- Gonner, E. C. K (1912). Common Land and Inclosure. London: Macmillan & Co.
- HM Government guide for Common land: "Management, protection and registering to use"
- HM Government guide for Common land: "Common land and village greens"
- HM Govt planning inspectorate – planning portal for common land.
- DEFRA Database of registered common land in England
- Federation of Cumbrian Commoners
