= List of acts of the Parliament of the United Kingdom from 1864 =

This is a complete list of acts of the Parliament of the United Kingdom for the year 1864.

Note that the first parliament of the United Kingdom was held in 1801; parliaments between 1707 and 1800 were either parliaments of Great Britain or of Ireland). For acts passed up until 1707, see the list of acts of the Parliament of England and the list of acts of the Parliament of Scotland. For acts passed from 1707 to 1800, see the list of acts of the Parliament of Great Britain. See also the list of acts of the Parliament of Ireland.

For acts of the devolved parliaments and assemblies in the United Kingdom, see the list of acts of the Scottish Parliament, the list of acts of the Northern Ireland Assembly, and the list of acts and measures of Senedd Cymru; see also the list of acts of the Parliament of Northern Ireland.

The number shown after each act's title is its chapter number. Acts passed before 1963 are cited using this number, preceded by the year(s) of the reign during which the relevant parliamentary session was held; thus the Union with Ireland Act 1800 is cited as "39 & 40 Geo. 3 c. 67", meaning the 67th act passed during the session that started in the 39th year of the reign of George III and which finished in the 40th year of that reign. Note that the modern convention is to use Arabic numerals in citations (thus "41 Geo. 3" rather than "41 Geo. III"). Acts of the last session of the Parliament of Great Britain and the first session of the Parliament of the United Kingdom are both cited as "41 Geo. 3".

Some of these acts have a short title. Some of these acts have never had a short title. Some of these acts have a short title given to them by later acts, such as by the Short Titles Act 1896.

== 27 & 28 Vict. ==
The sixth session of the 18th Parliament of the United Kingdom, which met from 4 February 1864 until 29 July 1864.

=== Public general acts ===
Short title	Citation	Royal assent
Long title
Annual Inclosure Act 1864	27 & 28 Vict. c. 1	18 March 1864
An Act to authorize the Inclosure of certain Lands in pursuance of a Report of the Inclosure Commissioners for England and Wales.
Salary of Sir J. Lawrence Act 1864 (repealed)	27 & 28 Vict. c. 2	18 March 1864
An Act to enable the Right Honourable Sir John Laird Mair Lawrence to receive the full Benefit of the Salary of Governor General of India, notwithstanding his being in receipt of an Annuity granted to him by the East India Company. (Repealed by Statute Law Revision Act 1875 (38 & 39 Vict. c. 66))
Mutiny Act 1864 (repealed)	27 & 28 Vict. c. 3	18 March 1864
An Act for the Regulation of Her Majesty's Royal Marine Forces while on shore. (Repealed by Statute Law Revision Act 1875 (38 & 39 Vict. c. 66))
Marine Mutiny Act 1864 (repealed)	27 & 28 Vict. c. 4	18 March 1864
An Act for the Regulation of Her Majesty's Royal Marine Forces while on shore. (Repealed by Statute Law Revision Act 1875 (38 & 39 Vict. c. 66))
Consolidated Fund (£584,650) Act or the Supply Act 1864 (repealed)	27 & 28 Vict. c. 5	18 March 1864
An Act to apply the Sum of Five hundred and eighty-four thousand six hundred and fifty Pounds out of the Consolidated Fund to the Service of the Year ending the Thirty-first Day of March One thousand eight hundred and sixty-four. (Repealed by Statute Law Revision Act 1875 (38 & 39 Vict. c. 66))
Consolidated Fund (£4,500,000) Act or the Supply (No. 2) Act 1864 (repealed)	27 & 28 Vict. c. 6	18 March 1864
An Act to apply the Sum of Four million five hundred thousand Pounds out of the Consolidated Fund to the Service of the Year One thousand eight hundred and sixty-four. (Repealed by Statute Law Revision Act 1875 (38 & 39 Vict. c. 66))
Bills of Exchange (Ireland) Act 1864 (repealed)	27 & 28 Vict. c. 7	28 April 1864
An Act to amend the Law relating to Bills of Exchange and Promissory Notes in Ireland. (Repealed by Judicature (Northern Ireland) Act 1978 (c. 23))
Conveyancers (Ireland) Act 1864 (repealed)	27 & 28 Vict. c. 8	28 April 1864
An Act to amend the Laws relating to Conveyancers, Special Pleaders, and Draughtsmen in Equity practising in Ireland. (Repealed by Statute Law Revision Act 1893 (56 & 57 Vict. c. 14), Finance Act (Northern Ireland) 1952 (c. 13 (N.I.)) and Repeal of Unnecessary Laws Act (Northern Ireland) 1953 (c. 5 (N.I.)))
Malt for Feeding Animals Act 1864 (repealed)	27 & 28 Vict. c. 9	28 April 1864
An Act to allow the making of Malt Duty-free to be used in feeding Animals. (Repealed by Inland Revenue Act 1880 (43 & 44 Vict. c. 20))
Union Relief Aid Continuance Act 1864 (repealed)	27 & 28 Vict. c. 10	28 April 1864
An Act to continue for a further Period certain Provisions of the Union Relief Aid Acts. (Repealed by Statute Law Revision Act 1875 (38 & 39 Vict. c. 66))
Consolidated Fund (£15,000,000) Act or the Supply (No. 3) Act 1864 (repealed)	27 & 28 Vict. c. 11	28 April 1864
An Act to apply the Sum of Fifteen Millions out of the Consolidated Fund to the Service of the Year One thousand eight hundred and sixty-four. (Repealed by Statute Law Revision Act 1875 (38 & 39 Vict. c. 66))
Warehousing of British Spirits Act 1864 (repealed)	27 & 28 Vict. c. 12	28 April 1864
An Act to amend the Laws relating to the warehousing of British Spirits. (Repealed by Spirits Act 1880 (43 & 44 Vict. c. 24) and Customs and Inland Revenue Act 1885 (48 & 49 Vict. c. 51))
Charities (Enrolment of Deeds) Act 1864 (repealed)	27 & 28 Vict. c. 13	13 May 1864
An Act to further extend the Time for making Enrolments under the Act passed in the Twenty-fourth Year of the Reign of Her present Majesty, intituled "An Act to amend the Law relating to the Conveyance of Lands for Charitable Uses," (Note: Charitable Uses Act 1861 (24 & 25 Vict. c. 9)) and otherwise to amend the said Law. (Repealed by Mortmain and Charitable Uses Act 1888 (51 & 52 Vict. c. 42))
Land Drainage Supplemental Act 1864	27 & 28 Vict. c. 14	13 May 1864
An Act to confirm certain Provisional Orders under "The Land Drainage Act, 1861." (Note: Land Drainage Act 1861 (24 & 25 Vict. c. 133))
	In the Matter of the River Wissey, situate in the several Parishes of Oxburgh, Foulden, Northwold, Methwold, Stoke Ferry, Wretton, Wereham, West Dereham, Roxham, and Hilgay, in the County of Norfolk.	
	In the Matter of Currymoor Improvement, situate in the several Parishes of Stoke St. Gregory, Lyng Durston, Creech St. Michael, and North Currey in the County of Somerset.	
	In the Matter of Stanmoor Improvement, situate in the Parish of Stoke Saint Gregory in the County of Somerset.	
	In the Matter of Dysynny Valley Drainage, situate in the several Parishes of Towyn, Llanegryn, Tallylyn, and Llanfihangel-y-Pennant in the County of Merioneth.	
Supreme Court (England) (Officers) Act 1864 (repealed)	27 & 28 Vict. c. 15	13 May 1864
An Act for making better and further Provision for the more efficient Despatch of Business in the High Court of Chancery. (Repealed by Statute Law Revision Act 1875 (38 & 39 Vict. c. 66))
Appointment of a Judge at Bombay Act 1864 (repealed)	27 & 28 Vict. c. 16	13 May 1864
An Act to confirm the Appointment of Henry Pendock St. George Tucker Esquire as One of the Judges of Her Majesty's High Court at Bombay, and to establish the Validity of certain Proceedings therein. (Repealed by Statute Law Revision Act 1875 (38 & 39 Vict. c. 66))
Vestry Cess Abolition (Ireland) Act 1864 (repealed)	27 & 28 Vict. c. 17	13 May 1864
An Act for the Abolition of Vestry Cess (Note: Vestry cess was a local tax, levied by parishes of the Church of Ireland, on all inhabitants of a parish regardless of their religious denomination. It paid for maintenance and running of the church, but also for civil purposes such as care of the poor.) in Ireland, and for other Purposes relating thereto. (Repealed by Statute Law Revision Act 1893 (56 & 57 Vict. c. 14))
Revenue (No. 1) Act 1864 or the Customs and Inland Revenue Act 1864 (repealed)	27 & 28 Vict. c. 18	13 May 1864
An Act to grant certain Duties of Customs and Inland Revenue. (Repealed by Revenue Act 1869 (32 & 33 Vict. c. 14), Inland Revenue Repeal Act 1870 (33 & 34 Vict. c. 99), Statute Law Revision Act 1875 (38 & 39 Vict. c. 66), Statute Law Revision Act 1893 (56 & 57 Vict. c. 14) (Note: Incorrectly cited as "SLR 1863" in the Chronological Table of the Statutes.), Income Tax Act 1918 (8 & 9 Geo. 5. c. 40), Customs and Excise Act 1952 (15 & 16 Geo. 6 & 1 Eliz. 2. c. 44), Finance Act (Northern Ireland) 1953 (c. 23 (N.I.)) and Late Night Refreshment Houses Act 1969 (c. 53))
Companies Seals Act 1864 (repealed)	27 & 28 Vict. c. 19	13 May 1864
An Act to enable Joint Stock Companies carrying on Business in Foreign Countries to have Official Seals to be used in such Countries. (Repealed by Companies (Consolidation) Act 1908 (8 Edw. 7. c. 69))
Promissory Notes (Ireland) Act 1864 (repealed)	27 & 28 Vict. c. 20	13 May 1864
An Act to remove certain Restrictions on the Negotiation of Promissory Notes and Bills of Exchange under a limited Sum in Ireland. (Repealed by Statute Law (Repeals) Act 1971 (c. 52))
Under Secretaries of State Indemnity Act 1864 (repealed)	27 & 28 Vict. c. 21	23 June 1864
An Act to indemnify certain Persons from any penal Consequences which they may have incurred by sitting and voting as Members of the House of Commons while holding the Office of Under Secretary of State. (Repealed by Statute Law Revision Act 1875 (38 & 39 Vict. c. 66))
Registration of County Voters (Ireland) Act 1864 (repealed)	27 & 28 Vict. c. 22	23 June 1864
An Act to amend the Laws which regulate the Registration of Parliamentary Voters in Counties in Ireland. (Repealed by Statute Law Revision Act 1893 (56 & 57 Vict. c. 14) and Representation of the People Act 1918 (7 & 8 Geo. 5. c. 64))
Naval Prize Acts Repeal Act 1864 (repealed)	27 & 28 Vict. c. 23	23 June 1864
An Act to repeal Enactments relating to Naval Prize of War and Matters connected therewith or with the Discipline or Management of the Navy. (Repealed by Statute Law Revision Act 1950 (14 Geo. 6. c. 6))
Naval Agency and Distribution Act 1864	27 & 28 Vict. c. 24	23 June 1864
An Act to provide for the Appointment, Duties, and Remuneration of Agents for Ships of War, and for the Distribution of Salvage, Bounty, Prize, and other Money among the Officers and Crews thereof.
Naval Prize Act 1864	27 & 28 Vict. c. 25	23 June 1864
An Act for regulating Naval Prize of War.
Local Government Supplemental Act 1864	27 & 28 Vict. c. 26	23 June 1864
An Act to confirm certain Provisional Orders under "The Local Government Act, 1858," (Note: Local Government Act 1858 (21 & 22 Vict. c. 98)) relating to the Districts of Southampton, Brighton, Hexham, Oswaldtwistle, Bolton, Ashford, Oswestry, Fareham, West Cowes, and Wilton.
	Provisional Order putting in force the Lands Clauses Consolidation Act, 1845, (Note: Lands Clauses Consolidation Act 1845 (8 & 9 Vict. c. 18)) within the Southampton Local Board of Health District, for the Purchase and taking of Lands by the said Board otherwise than by Agreement.	
	Provisional Order putting in force the Lands Clauses Consolidation Act, 1845, within the Brighton Local Board District, for the Purchase and taking of Lands by the said Board otherwise than by Agreement.	
	Provisional Order putting in force the Lands Clauses Consolidation Act, 1845, within the Hexham Local Board of Health District, for the Purchase and taking of Lands by the said Board otherwise than by Agreement.	
	Provisional Order putting in force the Lands Clauses Consolidation Act, 1845, within the Oswaldtwistle Local Board District, for the Purchase and taking of Lands by the said Board otherwise than by Agreement.	
	Provisional Order putting in force the Lands Clauses Consolidation Act, 1845, within the Bolton Local Board of Health District, for the Purchase and taking of Lands by the said Board otherwise than by Agreement.	
	Provisional Order repealing a Local Act (Note: Ashford Improvement Act 1824 (5 Geo. 4. c. liii)) in force within the District of the Ashford Local Board.	
	Provisional Order repealing a Local Act (Note: Oswestry Improvement Act 1809 (49 Geo. 3. c. cxl)) in force within the District of the Oswestry Local Board.	
	Provisional Order for extending the Borrowing Powers of the Fareham Local Board of Health.	
	Provisional Order for extending the Borrowing Powers of the West Cowes Local Board of Health.	
	Provisional Order for altering the Provisional Order applying the Public Health Act, 1848, (Note: Public Health Act 1848 (11 & 12 Vict. c. 63)) to the District of Wilton in the County of Wilts.	
Chain Cable and Anchor Act 1864 (repealed)	27 & 28 Vict. c. 27	23 June 1864
An Act for regulating the Proving and Sale of Chain Cables and Anchors. (Repealed by Anchors and Chain Cables Act 1899 (62 & 63 Vict. c. 23))
Common Law Procedure Amendment Act (Ireland) 1864 as to County of Cork Juries or the Common Law Procedure Amendment Act (Ireland) 1864 (repealed)	27 & 28 Vict. c. 28	23 June 1864
An Act to amend "The Common Law Procedure (Ireland) Act, 1853," (Note: Common Law Procedure Amendment Act (Ireland) 1853 (16 & 17 Vict. c. 113)) in relation to Jurors and Juries in the County of Cork. (Repealed by Statute Law (Repeals) Act 1993 (c. 50))
Insane Prisoners Act 1864 (repealed)	27 & 28 Vict. c. 29	23 June 1864
An Act to amend the Act Third and Fourth Victoria, Chapter Fifty-four, (Note: Insane Prisoners Act 1840 (3 & 4 Vict. c. 54)) for making further Provision for the Confinement and Maintenance of Insane Prisoners. (Repealed by Criminal Lunatics Act 1884 (47 & 48 Vict. c. 64))
Court of Justiciary (Scotland) Act 1864 (repealed)	27 & 28 Vict. c. 30	23 June 1864
An Act to provide for the Alteration of the Circuits of the Court of Justiciary in Scotland, and for holding additional Circuit Courts. (Repealed by Statute Law Revision Act 1893 (56 & 57 Vict. c. 14))
Annuity to Lady Elgin Act 1864 (repealed)	27 & 28 Vict. c. 31	30 June 1864
An Act to settle an Annuity on Mary Louisa Countess of Elgin and Kincardine, in consideration of the distinguished Services performed by the late James Earl of Elgin and Kincardine. (Repealed by Statute Law Revision Act 1953 (2 & 3 Eliz. 2. c. 5))
Banking Copartnerships Act 1864 (repealed)	27 & 28 Vict. c. 32	30 June 1864
An Act to enable certain Banking Copartnerships which shall discontinue the Issue of their own Bank Notes to sue and be sued by their public Officer. (Repealed by Statute Law Revision Act 1950 (14 Geo. 6. c. 6))
Fish Teinds (Scotland) Act 1864 (repealed)	27 & 28 Vict. c. 33	30 June 1864
An Act to facilitate the Commutation and Sale of certain Vicarage Teinds in Scotland. (Repealed by Abolition of Feudal Tenure etc. (Scotland) Act 2000 (asp 5))
House of Commons (Vacation of Seats) Act 1864 (repealed)	27 & 28 Vict. c. 34	30 June 1864
An Act for amending the Law relating to Seats in the House of Commons of Persons holding certain Public Offices. (Repealed by Ministers of the Crown Act 1937 (1 Edw. 8 & 1 Geo. 6. c. 38))
Beerhouses (Ireland) Act 1864 (repealed)	27 & 28 Vict. c. 35	30 June 1864
An Act for more effectually regulating the Sale of Beer in Ireland. (Repealed by Licensing Act (Northern Ireland) 1971 (c. 13 (N.I.)))
Army Prize (Shares of Deceased) Act 1864 (repealed)	27 & 28 Vict. c. 36	30 June 1864
An Act to amend the Law relative to the Payment of the Shares of Prize and other Money belonging to deceased Officers and Soldiers of Her Majesty's Land Forces. (Repealed by Statute Law Revision Act 1959 (7 & 8 Eliz. 2. c. 68))
Chimney Sweepers Regulation Act 1864 (repealed)	27 & 28 Vict. c. 37	30 June 1864
An Act to amend and extend the Act (Note: Chimney Sweepers and Chimneys Regulation Act 1840 (3 & 4 Vict. c. 85)) for the Regulation of Chimney Sweepers. (Repealed for England and Wales by Chimney Sweepers Acts (Repeal) Act 1938 (1 & 2 Geo. 6. c. 58) and for Scotland and Northern Ireland by Statute Law (Repeals) Act 1971 (c. 52))
Chief Rents Redemption (Ireland) Act 1864 (repealed)	27 & 28 Vict. c. 38	30 June 1864
An Act to facilitate the Redemption of Chief Rents in Ireland. (Repealed by Ground Rents Act (Northern Ireland) 2001 (c. 5 (N.I.)))
Union Assessment Committee Amendment Act 1864 (repealed)	27 & 28 Vict. c. 39	14 July 1864
An Act to amend the Union Assessment Committee Act (1862). (Note: Union Assessment Committee Act 1862 (25 & 26 Vict. c. 103)) (Repealed by Courts Act 1971 (c. 23))
Greek Loan Act 1864 (repealed)	27 & 28 Vict. c. 40	14 July 1864
An Act for authorizing the Relinquishment in favour of the King of the Hellenes of certain Money payable in respect of the Greek Loan. (Repealed by Statute Law Revision Act 1950 (14 Geo. 6. c. 6))
Coventry Grammar School Act 1864	27 & 28 Vict. c. 41	14 July 1864
An Act for confirming a Scheme of the Charity Commissioners for the Charity called "The Free Grammar School" in the City of Coventry.
Poor Law Officers Superannuation Act 1864 (repealed)	27 & 28 Vict. c. 42	14 July 1864
An Act to provide for Superannuation Allowances to Officers of Unions and Parishes. (Repealed by Poor Law Officers' Superannuation Act 1896 (59 & 60 Vict. c. 50))
Government Annuities Act 1864 (repealed)	27 & 28 Vict. c. 43	14 July 1864
An Act to grant additional Facilities for the Purchase of small Government Annuities, and for assuring Payments of Money on Death. (Repealed by Government Annuities Act 1929 (19 & 20 Geo. 5. c. 29))
Matrimonial Causes Act 1864 (repealed)	27 & 28 Vict. c. 44	14 July 1864
An Act to amend the Act relating to Divorce and Matrimonial Causes in England, Twentieth and Twenty-first Victoria, Chapter Eighty-five. (Note: Matrimonial Causes Act 1857 (20 & 21 Vict. c. 85)) (Repealed by Administration of Justice Act 1965 (c. 2))
Settled Estates Act Amendment Act 1864 (repealed)	27 & 28 Vict. c. 45	14 July 1864
An Act to further amend The Settled Estates Act of 1856. (Note: Settled Estates Act 1856 (19 & 20 Vict. c. 120)) (Repealed by Settled Estates Act 1877 (40 & 41 Vict. c. 18))
Government Annuities (Investments) Act 1864 (repealed)	27 & 28 Vict. c. 46	14 July 1864
An Act to provide for the Investment and Appropriation of all Monies received by the Commissioners for the Reduction of the National Debt on account of Deferred Life Annuities and Payments to be made on Death. (Repealed by Government Annuities Act 1929 (19 & 20 Geo. 5. c. 29))
Penal Servitude Act 1864 (repealed)	27 & 28 Vict. c. 47	25 July 1864
An Act to amend the Penal Servitude Acts. (Repealed for England and Wales by Criminal Justice Act 1948 (11 & 12 Geo. 6. c. 58), for Scotland by Criminal Justice (Scotland) Act 1949 (12, 13 & 14 Geo. 6. c. 94) and for Northern Ireland by Statute Law Revision Act 1875 (38 & 39 Vict. c. 66), Prevention of Crime Act 1879 (42 & 43 Vict. c. 55), Penal Servitude Act 1891 (54 & 55 Vict. c. 69), Statute Law Revision Act 1893 (56 & 57 Vict. c. 14) and Prison Act (Northern Ireland) 1953 (c. 18 (N.I.)))
Factory Acts Extension Act 1864 or the Factories Acts Extension Act 1864 (repealed)	27 & 28 Vict. c. 48	25 July 1864
An Act for the Extension of the Factory Acts. (Repealed by Factory and Workshop Act 1878 (41 & 42 Vict. c. 16))
Indemnity Act 1864 (repealed)	27 & 28 Vict. c. 49	25 July 1864
An Act to indemnify such Persons in the United Kingdom as have omitted to qualify themselves for Offices and Employments, and to extend the Time limited for those Purposes respectively. (Repealed by Promissory Oaths Act 1871 (34 & 35 Vict. c. 48))
Indian Stock Transfer Act 1864 (repealed)	27 & 28 Vict. c. 50	25 July 1864
An Act to amend an Act of the Twenty-fifth Year of the Reign of Her present Majesty, to provide for the Registration and Transfer of Indian Stocks at the Bank of Ireland, and for the mutual Transfer of such Stocks from and to the Banks of England and Ireland respectively. (Repealed by Statute Law Revision Act 1893 (56 & 57 Vict. c. 14))
Westminster Offices Act 1864	27 & 28 Vict. c. 51	25 July 1864
An Act to vest the Site of the India Office in Her Majesty for the Service of the Government of India.
Valuation (Ireland) Act 1864 (repealed)	27 & 28 Vict. c. 52	25 July 1864
An Act to amend the Law relating to the Valuation of Rateable Property in Ireland. (Repealed by Lands Tribunal and Compensation Act (Northern Ireland) 1964 (c. 29 (N.I.)) and Rates (Northern Ireland) Order 1972 (SI 1972/1633 (N.I. 16)))
Summary Procedure Act 1864 (repealed)	27 & 28 Vict. c. 53	25 July 1864
An Act to make Provision for Uniformity of Process in summary Criminal Prosecutions and Prosecutions for Penalties in the Inferior Courts in Scotland. (Repealed by Summary Jurisdiction (Scotland) Act 1908 (8 Edw. 7. c. 65))
Ecclesiastical Courts and Registries Act (Ireland) 1864 or the Ecclesiastical Courts and Registries (Ireland) Act 1864 (repealed)	27 & 28 Vict. c. 54	25 July 1864
An Act for the Union of the Diocesan Courts and Registries in Ireland; for the Regulation of the Mode of Procedure therein, and also in the Provincial Courts of Armagh and Dublin; and for Appeals therefrom. (Repealed by Irish Church Act 1869 (32 & 33 Vict. c. 42))
Metropolitan Police Act 1864 (repealed)	27 & 28 Vict. c. 55	25 July 1864
An Act for the better Regulation of Street Music within the Metropolitan Police District. (Repealed by Statute Law (Repeals) Act 1989 (c. 43))
Revenue (No. 2) Act 1864 (repealed)	27 & 28 Vict. c. 56	25 July 1864
An Act for granting to Her Majesty certain Stamp Duties; and to amend the Laws relating to the Inland Revenue. (Repealed by Customs and Inland Revenue Act 1867 (30 & 31 Vict. c. 23), Inland Revenue Repeal Act 1870 (33 & 34 Vict. c. 99), Pawnbrokers Act 1872 (35 & 36 Vict. c. 93), Statute Law Revision Act 1875 (38 & 39 Vict. c. 66), Taxes Management Act 1880 (43 & 44 Vict. c. 19), Inland Revenue Act 1880 (43 & 44 Vict. c. 20), Hawkers Act 1888 (51 & 52 Vict. c. 33), Revenue Act 1889 (52 & 53 Vict. c. 42), Pharmacy and Medicines Act 1941 (4 & 5 Geo. 6. c. 42), Finance Act 1949 (12, 13 & 14 Geo. 6. c. 47), Customs and Excise Act 1952 (15 & 16 Geo. 6 & 1 Eliz. 2. c. 44) and Finance Act 1975 (c. 7))
Admiralty Lands and Works Act 1864 (repealed)	27 & 28 Vict. c. 57	25 July 1864
An Act to make Provision respecting the Acquisition of Lands required by the Admiralty for the Public Service, and respecting the Use and Disposition thereof, and the Execution of Works thereon. (Repealed by Defence (Transfer of Functions) (No. 1) Order 1964 (SI 1964/488))
Hartlepool Pilotage Order Confirmation Act 1864 (repealed)	27 & 28 Vict. c. 58	25 July 1864
An Act for confirming a Provisional Order concerning Pilotage made by the Board of Trade under The Merchant Shipping Act Amendment Act, 1862, (Note: Merchant Shipping Act Amendment Act 1862 (25 & 26 Vict. c. 63)) relating to Hartlepool. (Repealed by Statute Law (Repeals) Act 1986 (c. 12))
	Provisional Order of the Board of Trade for constituting Pilotage Commissioners for Hartlepool in the County of Durham, and for regulating their Jurisdiction.	
Lunacy Board (Scotland) Act 1864 (repealed)	27 & 28 Vict. c. 59	25 July 1864
An Act to continue the Deputy Commissioners in Lunacy in Scotland, and to make further Provision for the Salaries of the Deputy Commissioners, Secretary, and Clerk of the General Board of Lunacy in Scotland. (Repealed by Mental Health (Scotland) Act 1960 (8 & 9 Eliz. 2. c. 61))
Lease of College of Physicians Act 1864 (repealed)	27 & 28 Vict. c. 60	25 July 1864
An Act to enable Her Majesty to grant a Lease for Nine hundred and ninety-nine Years of the Building known as the College of Physicians in Pall Mall East. (Repealed by Statute Law (Repeals) Act 1977 (c. 18))
Thames Embankment and Metropolis Improvement (Loans) Act 1864 or the Thames Embankment, etc. (Loans) Act 1864 (repealed)	27 & 28 Vict. c. 61	25 July 1864
An Act for empowering the Commissioners of the Treasury to guarantee, and the Commissioners for the Reduction of the National Debt to advance, the Sums authorized to be borrowed for the Embankment of the Thames and Improvement of the Metropolis; and for other Purposes connected therewith. (Repealed by Metropolitan Board of Works (Loans) Act 1869 (32 & 33 Vict. c. 102))
Isle of Man Harbours Amendment Act 1864 (repealed)	27 & 28 Vict. c. 62	25 July 1864
An Act for amending the Isle of Man Harbours Act, 1863. (Note: Isle of Man Harbours Act 1863 (26 & 27 Vict. c. 86)) (Repealed by Statute Law (Repeals) Act 1973 (c. 39))
Militia Ballots Suspension Act 1864 (repealed)	27 & 28 Vict. c. 63	25 July 1864
An Act to suspend the making of Lists and the Ballots for the Militia of the United Kingdom. (Repealed by Statute Law Revision Act 1875 (38 & 39 Vict. c. 66))
Public House Closing Act 1864 (repealed)	27 & 28 Vict. c. 64	25 July 1864
An Act for further regulating the closing of Public Houses and Refreshment Houses within the Metropolitan Police District the City of London certain Corporate Boroughs and other Places. (Repealed by Statute Law Revision Act 1959 (7 & 8 Eliz. 2. c. 68))
Clerks of the Peace Removal Act 1864 (repealed)	27 & 28 Vict. c. 65	25 July 1864
An Act for amending the Law relating to the Removal of Clerks of the Peace. (Repealed by Statute Law Revision (No. 2) Act 1893 (56 & 57 Vict. c. 54))
Second Annual Inclosure Act 1864	27 & 28 Vict. c. 66	25 July 1864
An Act to authorize the Inclosure of certain Lands in pursuance of a Special Report of the Inclosure Commissioners.
Game Trespass Act 1864 or the Game Trespass (Ireland) Act 1864	27 & 28 Vict. c. 67	25 July 1864
An Act to amend the Law in certain Cases relating to Trespasses in Pursuit of Game.
Oxford Local Board Act 1864 (repealed)	27 & 28 Vict. c. 68	25 July 1864
An Act to amend the Local Government Act of 1858 so far as it applies to Oxford. (Repealed by Oxford Corporation Act 1933 (23 & 24 Geo. 5. c. xxi))
Militia Pay Act 1864 (repealed)	27 & 28 Vict. c. 69	25 July 1864
An Act to defray the Charge of the Pay, Clothing, and contingent and other Expenses of the Disembodied Militia in Great Britain and Ireland; to grant Allowances in certain Cases to Subaltern Officers, Adjutants, Paymasters, Quartermasters, Surgeons, Assistant Surgeons, and Surgeons Mates of the Militia; and to authorize the Employment of the Non-commissioned Officers. (Repealed by Statute Law Revision Act 1875 (38 & 39 Vict. c. 66))
Cathedrals Act 1864 (repealed)	27 & 28 Vict. c. 70	25 July 1864
An Act to substitute fixed instead of fluctuating Incomes for the Members of certain minor Corporations in certain of the Cathedral Churches in England. (Repealed by Cathedrals Measure 1931 (No. 7))
Railways Act (Ireland) 1864 or the Railways (Ireland) Act 1864	27 & 28 Vict. c. 71	25 July 1864
An Act for amending and extending the Railways (Ireland) Act, 1851, (Note: Railways (Ireland) Act 1851 (14 & 15 Vict. c. 70)) and the Railways (Ireland) Act, 1860. (Note: Railways (Ireland) Act 1860 (23 & 24 Vict. c. 97))
Drainage and Improvement of Lands (Ireland) Act 1864 (repealed)	27 & 28 Vict. c. 72	25 July 1864
An Act to explain certain Provisions contained in the Drainage and Improvement of Lands (Ireland) Act, 1863. (Note: Drainage and Improvement of Lands Act (Ireland) 1863 (26 & 27 Vict. c. 88)) (Repealed by Erne Drainage and Development Act (Northern Ireland) 1950 (c. 15 (N.I.)))
Consolidated Fund (Appropriation) Act or the Consolidated Fund (Appropriation) Act 1864 (repealed)	27 & 28 Vict. c. 73	29 July 1864
An Act to apply a Sum out of the Consolidated Fund and the Surplus of Ways and Means to the Service of the Year One thousand eight hundred and sixty-four, and to appropriate the Supplies granted in this Session of Parliament. (Repealed by Statute Law Revision Act 1875 (38 & 39 Vict. c. 66))
Exchequer Bonds Act 1864 (repealed)	27 & 28 Vict. c. 74	29 July 1864
An Act for raising the Sum of One million six hundred thousand Pounds by Exchequer Bonds for the Service of the Year One thousand eight hundred and sixty-four. (Repealed by Statute Law Revision Act 1875 (38 & 39 Vict. c. 66))
Annual Turnpike Acts Continuance Act 1864 (repealed)	27 & 28 Vict. c. 75	29 July 1864
An Act to amend the Law relating to certain Nuisances on Turnpike Roads, and to continue certain Turnpike Acts in Great Britain. (Repealed by Statute Law (Repeals) Act 1981 (c. 19))
Registration of Deeds (Ireland) Act 1864 (repealed)	27 & 28 Vict. c. 76	29 July 1864
An Act to make valid defective Registration of Deeds in certain Cases, and to substitute Stamps in lieu of the Fees now payable on Proceedings in the Registrar of Deeds Office in Ireland. (Repealed by Registration of Deeds (Amendment) Act (Northern Ireland) 1967 (c. 30 (N.I.)))
Ionian States Acts of Parliament Act 1864 (repealed)	27 & 28 Vict. c. 77	29 July 1864
An Act to repeal and in part to re-enact certain Acts of Parliament relating to the Ionian States, and to establish the Validity of certain Things done in the said States. (Repealed by Foreign Marriage (Amendment) Act 1988 (c. 44))
Bank Notes (Ireland) Act 1864	27 & 28 Vict. c. 78	29 July 1864
An Act for impressing by Machinery Signatures of Names on Bank Notes and certain Bills of the Bank of Ireland.
Provisional Order Confirmation (Turnpikes) Act 1864 (repealed)	27 & 28 Vict. c. 79	29 July 1864
An Act to confirm certain Provisional Orders made under an Act of the Fifteenth Year of Her present Majesty, (Note: Turnpike Trusts (Making of Provisional Orders) Act 1851 (14 & 15 Vict. c. 38)) to facilitate Arrangements for the Relief of Turnpike Trusts. (Repealed by Statute Law (Repeals) Act 1981 (c. 19))
Summary Jurisdiction, Cinque Ports, etc. Act 1864 (repealed)	27 & 28 Vict. c. 80	29 July 1864
An Act to extend the Provisions of "The Criminal Justice Act, 1855" (Note: Criminal Justice Act 1855 (18 & 19 Vict. c. 126)) to the Liberties of the Cinque Ports and to the District of Romney Marsh in the County of Kent. (Repealed by Summary Jurisdiction Act 1879 (42 & 43 Vict. c. 49))
Revenues of Archbishopric of Armagh Act 1864	27 & 28 Vict. c. 81	29 July 1864
An Act for amending the Act 11th & 12th George the Third, Cap. 17. (I.), (Note: Clergy Residence and Glebe Lands (Ireland) Act 1771 (11 & 12 Geo. 3. c. 17 (I))) in respect of the Charges on the Revenues of the Archbishopric of Armagh.
New Zealand Loan Guarantee Act 1864 (repealed)	27 & 28 Vict. c. 82	29 July 1864
An Act to guarantee the Liquidation of a Loan for the Service of the Colony of New Zealand. (Repealed by New Zealand Loans Act 1866 (29 & 30 Vict. c. 104))
Local Government Supplemental Act 1864 (No. 2) or the Local Government Supplemental (No. 2) Act 1864	27 & 28 Vict. c. 83	29 July 1864
An Act to confirm certain Provisional Orders under "The Local Government Act, 1858," relating to the Districts of Kingston-upon-Hull, Stockport, Penzance, Shanklin, Portsmouth, Tunbridge Wells, Woolwich, and Tormoham.
	Provisional Order putting in force the Lands Clauses Consolidation Act, 1845, within the Borough of Kingston-upon-Hull, for the Purchase of Lands by the Local Board of Health of the aforesaid Borough for Street Improvements	
	Provisional Order putting in force the Lands Clauses Consolidation Act, 1845, within the Stockport Local Board District, for the Purchase and taking of Lands by the said Board otherwise than by Agreement.	
	Provisional Order putting in force the Lands Clauses Consolidation Act, 1845, within the Penzance Local Board of Health District, for the Purchase and taking of Lands by the said Board, otherwise than by Agreement.	
	Provisional Order repealing a Local Act (Note: Isle of Wight Highway Act 1813 (53 Geo. 3. c. xcii)) in force within the District of the Shanklin Local Board.	
	Provisional Order repealing and altering Parts of Local Acts in force within the District of the Stockport Local Board.	
	Provisional Order repealing and altering Parts of Local Acts in force within the District of the Portsmouth Local Board.	
	Provisional Order repealing and altering Parts of Acts in force within the District of the Board of Tunbridge Wells Improvement Commissioners.	
	Provisional Order for altering the Boundaries of the District of Tunbridge Wells in the Counties of Kent and Sussex.	
	Provisional Order putting in force the Lands Clauses Consolidation Act, 1845, within the District of the Woolwich Local Board of Health, for the Purchase of Land by the said Board for Street Improvements.	
	Provisional Order putting in force the Lands Clauses Consolidation Act, 1845, within the District of Tormoham, for the Purchase of Lands by the Local Board of Health of the aforesaid District for Street Improvements.	
Expiring Laws Continuance Act 1864 (repealed)	27 & 28 Vict. c. 84	29 July 1864
An Act for continuing various expiring Acts. (Repealed by Statute Law Revision Act 1875 (38 & 39 Vict. c. 66))
Contagious Diseases Prevention Act 1864 (repealed)	27 & 28 Vict. c. 85	29 July 1864
An Act for the Prevention of Contagious Diseases at certain Naval and Military Stations. (Repealed by Statute Law Revision Act 1875 (38 & 39 Vict. c. 66))
Bank Post Bills Composition (Ireland) Act 1864 (repealed)	27 & 28 Vict. c. 86	29 July 1864
An Act to permit for a limited Period Compositions for Stamp Duty on Bank Post Bills of Five Pounds and upwards in Ireland. (Repealed by Statute Law Revision Act 1875 (38 & 39 Vict. c. 66), Statute Law Revision Act 1893 (56 & 57 Vict. c. 14) and Finance (No. 2) Act (Northern Ireland) 1928 (18 & 19 Geo. 5. c. 29 (N.I.)))
Corn Accounts and Returns Act 1864 (repealed)	27 & 28 Vict. c. 87	29 July 1864
An Act to amend the Law relating to Publication of Accounts of Corn imported, and to Returns of Purchases and Sales of Corn. (Repealed by Corn Returns Act 1882 (45 & 46 Vict. c. 37))
Westminster Bridge Act 1864 (repealed)	27 & 28 Vict. c. 88	29 July 1864
An Act for the better regulation of the traffic on Westminster Bridge and for the prevention of obstructions thereon. (Repealed by Statute Law (Repeals) Act 1973 (c. 39))
Defence Act Amendment Act 1864	27 & 28 Vict. c. 89	29 July 1864
An Act to amend The Defence Act, 1842. (Note: Defence Act 1842 (5 & 6 Vict. c. 94))
Stamp Act 1864 (repealed)	27 & 28 Vict. c. 90	29 July 1864
An Act to amend an Act of the present Session, Chapter Eighteen, (Note: Revenue (No. 1) Act 1864 (27 & 28 Vict. c. 18)) as to the Stamp Duties on certain Letters or Powers of Attorney. (Repealed by Inland Revenue Repeal Act 1870 (33 & 34 Vict. c. 99))
Naval and Victualling Stores Act 1864 (repealed)	27 & 28 Vict. c. 91	29 July 1864
An Act for the more effectual Protection of Her Majesty's Naval and Victualling Stores. (Repealed by Naval Stores Act 1867 (30 & 31 Vict. c. 119))
Public Schools Act 1864 (repealed)	27 & 28 Vict. c. 92	29 July 1864
An Act for annexing Conditions to the Appointment of Persons to Offices in the Governing Bodies of certain Public Schools and Colleges. (Repealed by Statute Law Revision Act 1878 (41 & 42 Vict. c. 79))
Pier and Harbour Orders Confirmation Act 1864	27 & 28 Vict. c. 93	29 July 1864
An Act for confirming certain Provisional Orders made by the Board of Trade under The General Pier and Harbour Act, 1861, (Note: General Pier and Harbour Act 1861 (24 & 25 Vict. c. 45)) relating to Brighton, Eastbourne, Sandown, Walton-on-the-Naze, Clevedon, Rhyl, Bray, Kircubbin, Walton (Suffolk), Holywood, Exe Bight, Lytham, Ardglass, Filey, Greenock, Carlingford Lough, Wexford, Torquay, and Oban.
	Brighton West Pier Order 1864 Provisional Order of the Board of Trade for the Construction, Maintenance, and Regulation of a Pier at Brighton, in the County of Sussex.	
	Eastbourne Pier Order 1864 Provisional Order of the Board of Trade for the Construction, Maintenance, and Regulation of a Pier at Eastbourne, in the County of Sussex.	
	Sandown Pier Order 1864 Provisional Order of the Board of Trade for the Construction, Maintenance, and Regulation of a Pier at Sandown, in the Isle of Wight.	
	Walton-on-the-Naze Pier Order 1864 Provisional Order of the Board of Trade for the Construction, Maintenance, and Regulation of a Pier at Walton-on-the-Naze in the County of Essex.	
	Clevedon Pier Order 1864 Provisional Order of the Board of Trade for the Construction, Maintenance, and Regulation of a Pier at Clevedon in the County of Somerset.	
	Rhyl Promenade Pier Order 1864 Provisional Order of the Board of Trade for the Construction, Maintenance, and Regulation of a Pier at Rhyl, in the County of Flint.	
	Bray Pier and Harbour (Extension) Order 1864 Provisional Order of the Board of Trade for the Construction of Works at Bray in the County of Wicklow, in addition to those authorized by The Bray Pier and Harbour Order, 1863; and for other Purposes.	
	Kircubbin Harbour Order 1864 Provisional Order of the Board of Trade for the Improvement, Maintenance, and Regulation of the Harbour of Kircubbin, in the County of Down.	
	Walton (Suffolk) Pier Order 1864 Provisional Order of the Board of Trade for the Construction, Maintenance, and Regulation of a Pier at Walton in the County of Suffolk.	
	Holywood Pier and Quay Order 1864 Provisional Order of the Board of Trade for the Construction, Maintenance, and Regulation of a Pier and Quay at Holywood in the County of Down.	
	Exe Bight Pier Order 1864 Provisional Order of the Board of Trade for the Construction, Maintenance, and Regulation of a Pier in the Exe Bight in the Harbour of the River Exe in the County of Devon.	
	Lytham Pier Order 1864 Provisional Order of the Board of Trade for the Construction, Maintenance, and Regulation of a Pier at Lytham in the County of Lancaster.	
	Ardglass Harbour Order 1864 Provisional Order of the Board of Trade for the Improvement, Maintenance, and Regulation of the Harbour at Ardglass in the County of Down.	
	Filey Fishery Harbour Order 1864 Provisional Order of the Board of Trade for the r1onstruction, Maintenance, and Regulation of a Harbour at Filey in the County of York.	
	Greenock Harbour Order 1864 Provisional Order of the Board of Trade to enable the Trustees of the Port and Harbour of Greenock on the Frith of Clyde to widen and extend Albert Harbour there, and for the Improvement, Maintenance, and Regulation of the said Port and Harbours.	
	Harbour of Carlingford Lough Improvement Order 1864 Provisional Order of the Board of Trade for the Improvement and Regulation of the Harbour of Carlingford Lough in Ireland.	
	Wexford Harbour Order 1864 Provisional Order of the Board of Trade for the Improvement of the Entrance to Wexford Harbour.	
	Torquay Harbour Order 1864 Provisional Order of the Board of Trade for the Improvement, Maintenance, and Regulation of the Harbour of Torquay in the County of Devon.	
	Oban Pier and Harbour Order 1864 Provisional Order of the Board of Trade to enable; the Trustees of the late John Marquess of Breadalbane to construct further Works at the Harbour of Oban in the County of Argyll; and to levy Rates; and for the Improvement and Maintenance and Regulation of the said Harbour.	
Episcopal Church (Scotland) Act 1864	27 & 28 Vict. c. 94	29 July 1864
An Act to remove Disabilities affecting the Bishops and Clergy of the Protestant Episcopal Church in Scotland.
Fatal Accidents Act 1864 (repealed)	27 & 28 Vict. c. 95	29 July 1864
An Act to amend the Act Ninth and Tenth Victoria, Chapter Ninety-three, (Note: Fatal Accidents Act 1846 (9 & 10 Vict. c. 93)) for compensating the Families of Persons killed by Accident. (Repealed for England and Wales by Fatal Accidents Act 1976 (c. 30) and for Northern Ireland by Fatal Accidents (Northern Ireland) Order 1977 (SI 1977/1251 (N.I. 18)))
Sale of Gas (Scotland) Act 1864 (repealed)	27 & 28 Vict. c. 96	29 July 1864
An Act to enable certain Royal and Parliamentary Burghs in Scotland to avail themselves of the Provisions of the Acts Twenty-second and Twenty-third Victoria, Chapter Sixty-six, (Note: Sale of Gas Act 1859 (22 & 23 Vict. c. 66)) and Twenty-third and Twenty-fourth Victoria, Chapter One hundred and forty-six, (Note: Sale of Gas Act 1860 (23 & 24 Vict. c. 146)) for regulating the Sale of Gas. (Repealed by Gas Act 1948 (11 & 12 Geo. 6. c. 67))
Registration of Burials Act 1864	27 & 28 Vict. c. 97	29 July 1864
An Act to make further Provision for the Registration of Burials in England.
Bleaching and Dyeing Works Act Extension Act 1864 (repealed)	27 & 28 Vict. c. 98	29 July 1864
An Act for extending the Provisions of "The Bleaching and Dyeing Works Act, 1860." (Note: Bleaching and Dyeing Works Act 1860 (23 & 24 Vict. c. 78)) (Repealed by Factory and Workshop Act 1870 (33 & 34 Vict. c. 62))
Civil Bill Courts Procedure Amendment Act (Ireland) 1864 or the Civil Bill Courts Procedure Amendment (Ireland) Act 1864 (repealed)	27 & 28 Vict. c. 99	29 July 1864
An Act to amend the Procedure of the Civil Bill Courts in Ireland. (Repealed by Statute Law Revision Act 1893 (56 & 57 Vict. c. 14), County Courts Act (Northern Ireland) 1959 (c. 25 (N.I.)), Northern Ireland Act 1962 (c. 30), County Court Appeals Act (Northern Ireland) 1964 (c. 3 (N.I.)) and Judgments (Enforcement) Act (Northern Ireland) 1969 (c. 30 (N.I.)))
Justices Proceedings Confirmation (Sussex) Act 1864 (repealed)	27 & 28 Vict. c. 100	29 July 1864
An Act to confirm certain Proceedings of the Justices for the County of Sussex. (Repealed by County of Sussex Act 1865 (28 & 29 Vict. c. 37))
Highway Act 1864 (repealed)	27 & 28 Vict. c. 101	29 July 1864
An Act to amend the Act for the better Management of Highways in England. (Repealed by Statute Law (Repeals) Act 1971 (c. 52))
Harwich Harbour Act 1864 (repealed)	27 & 28 Vict. c. 102	29 July 1864
An Act for amending the Harwich Harbour Act, 1863. (Note: Harwich Harbour Act 1863 (26 & 27 Vict. c. 71)) (Repealed by Harwich Harbour Act 1974 (c. i))
Portsmouth Dockyard Act 1864	27 & 28 Vict. c. 103	29 July 1864
An Act to authorize the Acquisition of Lands by the Admiralty with a view to the Extension of Portsmouth Dockyard, and for other Purposes connected therewith.
Public Works (Manufacturing Districts) Act 1864 (repealed)	27 & 28 Vict. c. 104	29 July 1864
An Act to extend the Powers of the Public Works (Manufacturing Districts) Act, 1863. (Note: Public Works (Manufacturing Districts) Act 1863 (26 & 27 Vict. c. 70)) (Repealed by Statute Law Revision Act 1950 (14 Geo. 6. c. 6))
Poor Removal Act 1864 (repealed)	27 & 28 Vict. c. 105	29 July 1864
An Act to explain the Statutes of Her present Majesty for amending the Laws relating to the Removal of the Poor. (Repealed by Poor Law Act 1927 (17 & 18 Geo. 5. c. 14))
Sheriffs Substitute Act 1864 (repealed)	27 & 28 Vict. c. 106	29 July 1864
An Act to authorize the Lords Commissioners of the Treasury to make Provision in regard to the Salaries of certain Sheriffs Substitute in Scotland. (Repealed by Sheriff Courts (Scotland) Act 1907 (7 Edw. 7. c. 51))
Drainage and Improvement of Lands Supplemental Act, Ireland, 1864 or the Drainage and Improvement of Lands Supplemental (Ireland) Act 1864	27 & 28 Vict. c. 107	29 July 1864
An Act to confirm a Provisional Order under "The Drainage and Improvement of Lands (Ireland) Act, 1863."
	In the Matter of Athboy Drainage District, County of Meath.	
West Indian Incumbered Estates Act 1864 (repealed)	27 & 28 Vict. c. 108	29 July 1864
An Act to amend "The West Indian Incumbered Estates Acts." (Repealed by West Indian Incumbered Estates Act 1886 (49 & 50 Vict. c. 36))
Fortification for Royal Arsenals, etc. Act 1864 (repealed)	27 & 28 Vict. c. 109	29 July 1864
An Act for providing a further Sum towards defraying the Expenses of constructing Fortifications for the Protection of the Royal Arsenals and Dockyards and the Ports of Dover and Portland, and of creating a Central Arsenal. (Repealed by Revenue, Friendly Societies, and National Debt Act 1882 (45 & 46 Vict. c. 72))
Limited Penalties Act 1864 (repealed)	27 & 28 Vict. c. 110	29 July 1864
An Act for the Amendment of the Law relating to the Mitigation of Penalties. (Repealed by Statute Law (Repeals) Act 1993 (c. 50))
Cranbourne Street Act 1864	27 & 28 Vict. c. 111	29 July 1864
An Act to transfer certain Houses in and near Cranbourne Street in the City of Westminster from the Commissioners of Her Majesty's Works to Her Majesty, for the Considerations therein mentioned.
Judgments Act 1864 (repealed)	27 & 28 Vict. c. 112	29 July 1864
An Act to amend the Law relating to future Judgments, Statutes, and Recognizances. (Repealed by Administration of Justice Act 1956 (4 & 5 Eliz. 2. c. 46))
Thames Conservancy Act 1864 (repealed)	27 & 28 Vict. c. 113	29 July 1864
An Act to amend the Laws relating to the Conservancy of the River Thames; and for other Purposes relating thereto. (Repealed by Thames Conservancy Act 1894 (57 & 58 Vict. c. clxxxvii))
Improvement of Land Act 1864	27 & 28 Vict. c. 114	29 July 1864
The Improvement of Land Act, 1864. (Repealed for Scotland by Abolition of Feudal Tenure etc. (Scotland) Act 2000 (asp 5))
Poisoned Flesh Prohibition Act 1864 (repealed)	27 & 28 Vict. c. 115	29 July 1864
An Act to prohibit the placing of poisoned Flesh and poisonous Matters in Plantations, Fields, and open Places, and to extend "The poisoned Grain Prohibition Act, 1863." (Repealed for England and Wales and Ireland by Protection of Animals Act 1911 (1 & 2 Geo. 5. c. 27) and for Scotland by Protection of Animals (Scotland) Act 1912 (2 & 3 Geo. 5. c. 14))
Metropolitan Houseless Poor Act 1864 (repealed)	27 & 28 Vict. c. 116	29 July 1864
An Act to make Provision for distributing the Charge of Relief of certain Classes of poor Persons over the whole of the Metropolis. (Repealed by Poor Law Act 1927 (17 & 18 Geo. 5. c. 14))
Metric Weights and Measures Act 1864 or the Weights and Measures Act 1864 (repealed)	27 & 28 Vict. c. 117	29 July 1864
An Act to render permissive the Use of the Metric System of Weights and Measures. (Repealed by Weights and Measures Act 1878 (41 & 42 Vict. c. 49))
Salmon Fisheries (Scotland) Act 1864 (repealed)	27 & 28 Vict. c. 118	29 July 1864
An Act to amend the Acts relating to Salmon Fisheries in Scotland. (Repealed by Salmon Act 1986 (c. 62))
Naval Discipline Act 1864 (repealed)	27 & 28 Vict. c. 119	29 July 1864
An Act to make Provision for the Discipline of the Navy. (Repealed by Naval Discipline Act 1866 (29 & 30 Vict. c. 109))
Railway Companies' Powers Act 1864 (repealed)	27 & 28 Vict. c. 120	29 July 1864
An Act to facilitate in certain Cases the obtaining of further Powers by Railway Companies. (Repealed by Statute Law Revision Act 1960 (8 & 9 Eliz. 2. c. 56))
Railways Construction Facilities Act 1864 (repealed)	27 & 28 Vict. c. 121	29 July 1864
An Act to facilitate in certain Cases the obtaining of Powers for the Construction of Railways. (Repealed by Statute Law Revision Act 1960 (8 & 9 Eliz. 2. c. 56))

=== Local acts ===
Short title	Citation	Royal assent
Long title
Llanelly Railway and Dock Company's Capital Act 1864	27 & 28 Vict. c. i	28 April 1864
An Act to confer certain Powers on the Llanelly Railway and Dock Company with respect to their Capital.
Hull Docks Act 1864	27 & 28 Vict. c. ii	28 April 1864
An Act to enable the Dock Company at Kingston-upon-Hull to raise a further Sum of Money.
Newry and Greenore Railway Amendment Act 1864	27 & 28 Vict. c. iii	28 April 1864
An Act for granting further Powers to "The Newry and Greenore Railway Company."
Southwark Park Act 1864 (repealed)	27 & 28 Vict. c. iv	28 April 1864
An Act to enable the Metropolitan Board of Works to provide a public Park for the South-eastern Districts of the Metropolis, to be called Southwark Park. (Repealed by Local Law (Greater London Council and Inner London Boroughs) Order 1965 (SI 1965/540))
Folkestone Waterworks Acts Amendment Act 1864	27 & 28 Vict. c. v	28 April 1864
An Act to amend the existing Acts of the Folkestone Waterworks Company, and to confer further Powers upon the Company.
Matlock Bath Waterworks Act 1864	27 & 28 Vict. c. vi	28 April 1864
An Act for better supplying Matlock Bath in the County of Derby with Water.
Marple, New Mills and Hayfield Junction Railway Act 1864	27 & 28 Vict. c. vii	28 April 1864
An Act for altering the Marple New Mills and Hayfield Junction Railway; extending the Time for Completion of Portions thereof; and for other Purposes.
Southwark and Vauxhall Water Act 1864	27 & 28 Vict. c. viii	28 April 1864
An Act to empower the Southwark and Vauxhall Water Company to raise further Money; and for other Purposes.
Chertsey Gas Consumers Company (Limited) Act 1864	27 & 28 Vict. c. ix	28 April 1864
An Act for granting certain Powers to "The Chertsey Gas Consumers Company (Limited)."
Kingston-upon-Thames Gas Company's Act 1864 (repealed)	27 & 28 Vict. c. x	28 April 1864
An Act for granting further Powers to the Kingston-upon-Thames Gas Company. (Repealed by Wandsworth, Wimbledon and Epsom District Gas Order 1930 (SR&O 1930/544))
Tunbridge Wells Gas Act 1864	27 & 28 Vict. c. xi	28 April 1864
An Act to incorporate "The Tunbridge Wells Gas Company;" to extend their Limits for supplying Gas; to repeal the Deeds of Settlement under which the Company is established; to authorize the raising of further Capital; and for other Purposes.
Dublin and Belfast Junction Railway Act 1864	27 & 28 Vict. c. xii	28 April 1864
An Act to alter and regulate the Capital and Borrowing Powers of the Dublin and Belfast Junction Railway Company; and for other Purposes.
Carmarthen and Cardigan Railway (Kidwelly Branch) Act 1864	27 & 28 Vict. c. xiii	28 April 1864
An Act to enable the Carmarthen and Cardigan Railway Company to make a Branch Railway near Kidwelly in Carmarthenshire.
Dovor Gas (Amendment) Act 1864 or the Dover Gas (Amendment) Act 1864	27 & 28 Vict. c. xiv	28 April 1864
An Act to authorize the Dovor Gaslight Company to purchase certain Land; to raise more Money; and for other Purposes.
Metropolitan Meat and Poultry Market (Borrowing) Act 1864	27 & 28 Vict. c. xv	28 April 1864
An Act to amend the Metropolitan Meat and Poultry Market Act, 1860, (Note: Metropolitan Meat and Poultry Market Act 1860 (23 & 24 Vict. c. cxciii)) and other Acts, with respect to the borrowing of Money; and for other Purposes.
Calne Railway Act 1864	27 & 28 Vict. c. xvi	28 April 1864
An Act for granting further Powers to "The Calne Railway Company."
Ipswich Gas Act 1864	27 & 28 Vict. c. xvii	28 April 1864
An Act to enable the Ipswich Gaslight Company to increase their Capital.
Swansea Vale Railway (Money) Act 1864	27 & 28 Vict. c. xviii	28 April 1864
An Act to enable the Swansea Vale Railway Company to raise a further Sum of Money.
South Yorkshire Railway Act 1864	27 & 28 Vict. c. xix	13 May 1864
An Act to enable the South Yorkshire Railway and River Dun Company to extend their Railway to the Midland Railway at Barnsley.
North Eastern Railway (Micklefield Branch) Act 1864	27 & 28 Vict. c. xx	13 May 1864
An Act to enable the North-eastern Railway Company to construct a Branch Railway and Works between Church Fenton and Micklefield, in the County of York; to raise additional Capital; and for other Purposes.
Salisbury Railway and Market House Company's Act 1864 (repealed)	27 & 28 Vict. c. xxi	13 May 1864
An Act to amend "The Salisbury Railway and Market House Act, 1856;" (Note: Salisbury Railway and Market House Act 1856 (19 & 20 Vict. c. xciii)) and to enable the Company thereby incorporated to increase their Capital and for other Purposes. (Repealed by Salisbury Railway and Market House Act 1969 (c. xviii))
Llanidloes and Newtown Railway Act 1864	27 & 28 Vict. c. xxii	13 May 1864
An Act to extend the Time limited for the Purchase of certain Lands by Acts relating to the Llanidloes and Newtown Railway Company; and to authorize that Company to raise and apply Money to the general Purposes of their Undertaking; and for other Purposes.
Salisbury Gas Act 1864	27 & 28 Vict. c. xxiii	13 May 1864
An Act for incorporating and granting other Powers to "The Salisbury Gaslight and Coke Company."
Sudden Bridge and Bury Roads Act 1864 (repealed)	27 & 28 Vict. c. xxiv	13 May 1864
An Act for repairing and maintaining the Sudden Bridge and Bury Roads in the County Palatine of Lancaster; and for other Purposes. (Repealed by Annual Turnpike Acts Continuance Act 1875 (38 & 39 Vict. c. cxciv))
Haslingden and Rawtenstall Waterworks Act 1864 (repealed)	27 & 28 Vict. c. xxv	13 May 1864
An Act to enable the Haslingden and Rawtenstall Waterworks Company to raise a further Sum of Money, and to construct Works; and for other Purposes. (Repealed by County of Lancashire Act 1984 (c. xxi))
Great North of Scotland Railway Act 1864	27 & 28 Vict. c. xxvi	13 May 1864
An Act to enable the Great North of Scotland Railway Company to contribute further Monies to certain Undertakings.
Huntingdon and Godmanchester Gas and Coke Act 1864	27 & 28 Vict. c. xxvii	13 May 1864
An Act for enabling the Huntingdon and Godmanchester Gas and Coke Company (Limited) to acquire additional Land.
Dublin and Meath Railway Act 1864	27 & 28 Vict. c. xxviii	13 May 1864
An Act to enable the Dublin and Meath Railway Company to raise a further Sum of Money; and for other Purposes.
Edgware, Highgate and London Railway Act 1864	27 & 28 Vict. c. xxix	13 May 1864
An Act to authorize the Edgware, Highgate, and London Railway Company to extend their Railway to the Alexandra Park; and for other Purposes.
Clayton, Allerton and Thornton Gas Act 1864 (repealed)	27 & 28 Vict. c. xxx	13 May 1864
An Act for lighting with Gas the Townships of Clayton, Allerton, and Thornton, and certain neighbouring Townships or Parts thereof in the West Riding of the County of York. (Repealed by West Yorkshire Act 1980 (c. xiv))
Surrey Commercial Dock Act 1864	27 & 28 Vict. c. xxxi	13 May 1864
An Act for amalgamating the Undertakings of the Commercial Dock Company and of the Grand Surrey Docks and Canal Company; for consolidating and amending their Acts; and for other Purposes.
Lancashire and Yorkshire Railway (Additional Powers) Act 1864	27 & 28 Vict. c. xxxii	13 May 1864
An Act to confer Powers on the Lancashire and Yorkshire Railway Company for the Execution of new Works and the Acquisition of additional Lands, and other wise in relation to their Undertaking; and for other Purposes.
Aberbrothwick Harbour Act 1864	27 & 28 Vict. c. xxxiii	13 May 1864
An Act to make Provision for equalizing the Revenue and Expenditure of the Aberbrothwick Harbour Trust; to enable the Trustees to borrow a further Sum of Money; and for other Purposes relating to the said Harbour.
Anglesey Central Railway (Deviation) Act 1864	27 & 28 Vict. c. xxxiv	13 May 1864
An Act to enable the Anglesey Central Railway Company to make a Deviation of a Portion of their authorized Line.
London, Brighton and South Coast Railway (Kemptown Station and Line) Act 1864	27 & 28 Vict. c. xxxv	13 May 1864
An Act to enable the London, Brighton, and South Coast Railway Company to provide Station Accommodation at Kemp Town, Brighton, and to construct a new Railway in connexion therewith; and for other Purposes.
Pontypridd Waterworks Act 1864	27 & 28 Vict. c. xxxvi	23 June 1864
An Act to incorporate the Pontypridd Waterworks Company (Limited), and to make further Provision for the Supply of Water to the Town of Pontypridd and the Neighbourhood thereof.
Thornset Turnpike Roads Act 1864	27 & 28 Vict. c. xxxvii	23 June 1864
An Act to extend the Term and amend the Provisions of the Act (Note: Thornset and Disley Road Act 1833 (3 & 4 Will. 4. c. xix)) relating to the Thornset Turnpike Roads.
Bedford Gas Act 1864	27 & 28 Vict. c. xxxviii	23 June 1864
An Act to re-incorporate the Bedford Gaslight Company, and make further Provision for lighting the Borough of Bedford in the County of Bedford and certain neighbouring Parishes with Gas.
Chelsea Waterworks Act 1864	27 & 28 Vict. c. xxxix	23 June 1864
An Act for authorizing the Governor and Company of Chelsea Waterworks to raise further Monies; and for other Purposes.
Stroud Gas Act 1864	27 & 28 Vict. c. xl	23 June 1864
An Act to incorporate the Stroud Gaslight and Coke Company, and make further Provision for lighting the Borough of Stroud and Parish of Eastington with Gas; and for other Purposes.
Swansea Harbour Act 1864	27 & 28 Vict. c. xli	23 June 1864
An Act to enable the Swansea Harbour Trustees to construct additional Works, and to raise a further Sum of Money for the Purposes of their Undertaking; and for other Purposes.
Drogheda Waterworks Act 1864	27 & 28 Vict. c. xlii	23 June 1864
An Act for better supplying the Town of Drogheda and Neighbourhood thereof with Water; and for other Purposes.
Andover and East Ilsley Road Act 1864 (repealed)	27 & 28 Vict. c. xliii	23 June 1864
An Act to repeal An Act (Note: Hursley and Chilton Pond Turnpike Road Act 1828 (9 Geo. 4. c. xlvii)) for repairing the Road from the present Turnpike Road in the Parish of Hursley in the County of Southampton to Andover, and from thence to Newbury, and from Newbury to Chilton Pond in the County of Berks, and for granting more effectual Powers in lieu thereof. (Repealed by Annual Turnpike Acts Continuance Act 1880 (43 & 44 Vict. c. 12))
Clifton Hampden Bridge Act 1864	27 & 28 Vict. c. xliv	23 June 1864
An Act for the making and maintaining a Bridge over the River Thames or Isis, near the Ferry at Clifton Hampden in the County of Oxford, with Approaches thereto; and for other Purposes.
Deal and Walmer Gas Act 1864	27 & 28 Vict. c. xlv	23 June 1864
An Act to incorporate the Deal and Walmer Gaslight and Coke Company, Limited, and to make further Provision for lighting the Town of Deal and Parish of Walmer and certain neighbouring Places with Gas.
Chichester Harbour Embankment Act 1864	27 & 28 Vict. c. xlvi	23 June 1864
An Act for extending the Powers of "The Chichester Harbour Embankment Act, 1859." (Note: Chichester Harbour Embankment Act 1859 (22 & 23 Vict. c. cvii))
Ashton-under-Lyne and Stalybridge (Corporations) Waterworks Act 1864	27 & 28 Vict. c. xlvii	23 June 1864
An Act to enable the Corporations of the Boroughs of Ashton-under-Lyne and Stalybridge to provide a further Supply of Water for those Boroughs and the Neighbourhood thereof respectively; and for other Purposes.
Llynvi and Ogmore Railways Act 1864	27 & 28 Vict. c. xlviii	23 June 1864
An Act for authorizing the Improvement of the Harbour of Porth Cawl, to confirm Arrangements relative thereto between the Llynvi Valley Railway Company and the Ogmore Valley Railways Company; and for other Purposes.
North Eastern Railway (York and Doncaster Branch) Act 1864	27 & 28 Vict. c. xlix	23 June 1864
An Act to enable the North-eastern Railway Company to construct Railways between their Main Line near York and the Great Northern Railway near Doncaster; to raise additional Capital and for other Purposes.
Pucklechurch Roads Act 1864 (repealed)	27 & 28 Vict. c. l	23 June 1864
An Act for continuing the Term of and otherwise amending the Act (Note: Pucklechurch or Lower District of Roads Act 1831 (1 Will. 4. c. lxii)) relating to "The Pucklechurch or Lower District of Roads," in the Counties of Gloucester and Wilts. (Repealed by Annual Turnpike Acts Continuance Act 1878 (41 & 42 Vict. c. 62))
Greenwich and South Eastern Docks Act 1864	27 & 28 Vict. c. li	23 June 1864
An Act for extending the Time for the Purchase of Lands and the Completion of the Works authorized by "The Greenwich and South-eastern Docks Act, 1859." (Note: Greenwich and South Eastern Docks Act 1859 (22 & 23 Vict. c. xx))
Hedon and Patrington Road Act 1864 (repealed)	27 & 28 Vict. c. lii	23 June 1864
An Act to continue the Hedon and Patrington Turnpike Trust in the East Riding of the County of York; and for other Purposes. (Repealed by Annual Turnpike Acts Continuance Act 1874 (37 & 38 Vict. c. 95))
Newport (Monmouthshire) Roads Act 1864 (repealed)	27 & 28 Vict. c. liii	23 June 1864
An Act to repeal the Acts relating to the Newport (Monmouthshire) Turnpike Trust and the Caerleon Turnpike Trust, and to amalgamate those Trusts; and for other Purposes. (Repealed by Annual Turnpike Acts Continuance Act 1878 (41 & 42 Vict. c. 62))
Portmadoc and Beaver Pool Bridge Roads Act 1864	27 & 28 Vict. c. liv	23 June 1864
An Act for the Portmadoc and Beaver Pool Bridge Turnpike Roads in the Counties of Merioneth and Carnarvon.
Methley Railway Act 1864	27 & 28 Vict. c. lv	23 June 1864
An Act to give Effect to the Provisions of "The West Yorkshire Railway Act, 1863," (Note: West Yorkshire Railway Act 1863 (26 & 27 Vict. c. clxvii)) with reference to the Admission of the North-eastern and Lancashire and Yorkshire Railway Companies to become joint Owners with the West Yorkshire Railway Company of the Methley Railway; and for other Purposes.
Hertford Gas Act 1864	27 & 28 Vict. c. lvi	23 June 1864
An Act for incorporating the Hertford Gaslight Company, for extending their Limits for supplying Gas, for the Increase and Regulation of their Capital; and for other Purposes.
London Necropolis and National Mausoleum Act 1864	27 & 28 Vict. c. lvii	23 June 1864
An Act to amend the "London Necropolis and National Mausoleum Amendment Act, 1855;" (Note: London Necropolis and National Mausoleum Amendment Act 1855 (18 & 19 Vict. c. clxiii)) and for other Purposes.
Cowes and Newport Railway Act 1864	27 & 28 Vict. c. lviii	23 June 1864
An Act for authorizing the Cowes and Newport Railway Company to make and maintain Extension and Branch Railways in the Isle of Wight, and to raise Funds for the Purpose; and for other Purposes.
Brough Ferry Road Act 1864 (repealed)	27 & 28 Vict. c. lix	23 June 1864
An Act to extend the Term and amend the Provisions of the Act (Note: Road from Brough Ferry and from Brough to Welton Act 1832 (2 & 3 Will. 4. c. xv)) relating to the Turnpike Road from Brough Ferry to South Newbald Holmes, and from Brough to Welton, in the East Riding of the County of York (Repealed by Annual Turnpike Acts Continuance Act 1872 (35 & 36 Vict. c. 85))
Caledonian Railway (Bredisholm and Tennochside Branch) Act 1864	27 & 28 Vict. c. lx	23 June 1864
An Act to enable the Caledonian Railway Company to make a Branch Railway from their Rutherglen and Coatbridge Branch to Tennochside in the County of Lanark; and for other Purposes.
Holborn Valley Improvement Act 1864	27 & 28 Vict. c. lxi	23 June 1864
An Act to authorize the Corporation of the City of London to form a Viaduct or raised Way across the Holborn Valley, and new Streets and Improvements connected therewith; and for other Purposes.
Bedford and Cambridge Railway Act 1864	27 & 28 Vict. c. lxii	23 June 1864
An Act to authorize Arrangements between the Bedford and Cambridge and London and North-western Railway Companies; and for other Purposes.
Stirling Waterworks Amendment Act 1864	27 & 28 Vict. c. lxiii	23 June 1864
An Act to authorize the Stirling Waterworks Commissioners to make and maintain additional Reservoirs and other Works, and to extend the Supply of Water; and for other Purposes.
Salop Fire Office Act 1864	27 & 28 Vict. c. lxiv	23 June 1864
An Act for incorporating the Salop Fire Office, and for other Purposes relating thereto.
Trent, Ancholme and Grimsby Railway Act 1864	27 & 28 Vict. c. lxv	23 June 1864
An Act to enable the Trent, Ancholme, and Grimsby Railway Company to raise further Money.
Westminster Palace Hotel Company's Act 1864	27 & 28 Vict. c. lxvi	23 June 1864
An Act to confer upon the Westminster Palace Hotel Company, Limited, further Powers with respect to Arrangements between them and Her Majesty's Principal Secretary of State in Council of India, and for other Purposes connected with their Undertaking.
North Eastern Railway (Auckland and other Branches) Act 1864	27 & 28 Vict. c. lxvii	23 June 1864
An Act to enable the North-eastern Railway Company to make Branch Railways and other Works in the Counties of Durham and Cumberland; to raise additional Capital; and for other Purposes.
Scarborough Valley Bridge Company's Act 1864	27 & 28 Vict. c. lxviii	23 June 1864
An Act to incorporate the Scarborough Valley Bridge Company; to authorize the Construction of a Bridge over the Ramsdale Valley in Scarborough, with Approaches; and for other Purposes.
Rock Life Assurance Act 1864	27 & 28 Vict. c. lxix	23 June 1864
An Act for making further Provision with respect to the Investment of Monies of the Rock Life Assurance Company; and for other Purposes.
Moira and Gresley Road Act 1864 (repealed)	27 & 28 Vict. c. lxx	23 June 1864
An Act for more effectually repairing certain Roads from Scaddow Gate in the Parish of Ticknall to the Burton-upon-Trent and Ashby Road, and other Roads connected therewith, and for making new Branches of Road, in the Counties of Derby and Leicester; and for other Purposes. (Repealed by Annual Turnpike Acts Continuance Act 1885 (48 & 49 Vict. c. 37))
North Western Railway Act 1864	27 & 28 Vict. c. lxxi	23 June 1864
An Act to authorize Arrangements of the Capital of the North-western Railway Company.
Liverpool Improvement Act 1864 (repealed)	27 & 28 Vict. c. lxxii	23 June 1864
An Act to authorize the Construction of new and widening and altering of existing Streets and other Improvements in the Borough of Liverpool; and for other Purposes. (Repealed by Liverpool Corporation Act 1921 (11 & 12 Geo. 5. c. lxxiv))
Liverpool Sanitary Amendment Act 1864 (repealed)	27 & 28 Vict. c. lxxiii	23 June 1864
An Act for making further Provision with respect to the sanitary Condition of the Borough of Liverpool; and for other Purposes. (Repealed by Liverpool Corporation Act 1921 (11 & 12 Geo. 5. c. lxxiv))
Chesterfield and Hernstone Lane Head Turnpike Roads Act 1864	27 & 28 Vict. c. lxxiv	23 June 1864
An Act for continuing the Term of the Turnpike Road from Chesterfield to Hernstone Lane Head, with its Branches, all in the County of Derby; and for other Purposes.
Chichester and Midhurst Railway Act 1864	27 & 28 Vict. c. lxxv	23 June 1864
An Act to incorporate a Company for making "The Chichester and Midhurst Railway."
East and West Junction Railway Act 1864	27 & 28 Vict. c. lxxvi	23 June 1864
An Act for making a Railway from the Northampton and Banbury Junction Railway to the Great Western Railway at Stratford-on-Avon.
South Yorkshire Railway and River Dun Company's Transfer Act 1864 or the South Yorkshire Railway and River Dun Transfer Act 1864	27 & 28 Vict. c. lxxvii	23 June 1864
An Act to authorize the Transfer of the Undertaking of the South Yorkshire Railway and River Dun Company to the Manchester, Sheffield, and Lincolnshire Railway Company.
Manchester, Sheffield and Lincolnshire Railway Act 1864	27 & 28 Vict. c. lxxviii	23 June 1864
An Act to grant to the Manchester, Sheffield, and Lincolnshire Railway Company certain Powers with respect to the Stockport and Woodley Junction, Cheshire Midland, Stockport, Timperley, and Altrincham Junction, and West Cheshire Railways, and to empower the Company to enlarge its Canal Premises in Manchester; and for other Purposes.
Tendring Hundred Railway Acts Amendment Act 1864	27 & 28 Vict. c. lxxix	23 June 1864
An Act to enable the Tendring Hundred Railway Company to alter their Line to Walton in Essex; and for other Purposes.
Ribblesdale Railway Act 1864 (repealed)	27 & 28 Vict. c. lxxx	23 June 1864
An Act for making a Railway from the Lancashire and Yorkshire Railway at Chatburn to the North-western Railway at Settle, to be called "The Ribblesdale Railway;" and for other Purposes. (Repealed by Statute Law (Repeals) Act 2013 (c. 2))
Edinburgh and Glasgow and Alva Railways Amalgamation Act 1864	27 & 28 Vict. c. lxxxi	23 June 1864
An Act to amalgamate the Alva Railway Company with the Edinburgh and Glasgow Railway Company.
Alyth Railway Act 1864	27 & 28 Vict. c. lxxxii	23 June 1864
An Act for vesting the Alyth Railway, by way of Lease, in the Scottish North-eastern Railway Company; to enable the Alyth Railway Company to raise additional Capital; and for other Purposes.
Scottish North Eastern and Perth Almond Valley and Methven Railways Act 1864	27 & 28 Vict. c. lxxxiii	23 June 1864
An Act to enable the Perth, Almond Valley, and Methven Railway Company to raise additional Capital, and to sell their Undertaking to the Scottish North-eastern Railway Company, and to enable that Company to purchase the same; and for other Purposes.
North British Railway (Abbey Holme Branch) Act 1864	27 & 28 Vict. c. lxxxiv	23 June 1864
An Act to authorize the North British Railway Company to make a Railway from the Carlisle and Silloth Bay Railway in the Parish of Holme Cultram to the Maryport and Carlisle Railway in the Parish of Wigton, all in the County of Cumberland; and for other Purposes.
Wrexham Waterworks Act 1864	27 & 28 Vict. c. lxxxv	23 June 1864
An Act for better supplying the Borough of Wrexham and Neighbourhood thereof with Water; and for other Purposes.
Ely, Haddenham and Sutton Railway Act 1864	27 & 28 Vict. c. lxxxvi	23 June 1864
An Act to authorize the Construction of a Railway from Ely, through Haddenham, to Sutton, in Cambridgeshire.
South-western (Chertsey Extension) Railway Act 1864 or the South Western Railway (Chertsey Extension) Act 1864	27 & 28 Vict. c. lxxxvii	23 June 1864
An Act for authorizing the London and South-western Railway Company to make and maintain a Railway from the London and South-western Railway at Chertsey to the Staines and Wokingham Railway at Egham; and for other Purposes.
Salisbury and Yeovil Railway Act 1864	27 & 28 Vict. c. lxxxviii	23 June 1864
An Act to empower the Salisbury and Yeovil Railway Company to acquire additional Lands, and to raise more Money; and for other Purposes.
South Staffordshire Waterworks Amendment Act 1864	27 & 28 Vict. c. lxxxix	23 June 1864
An Act to enable the South Staffordshire Waterworks Company to construct additional Works, and obtain a further Supply of Water, and to extend their Supply of Water into other Districts; and for other Purposes.
West Norfolk Junction Railway Act 1864	27 & 28 Vict. c. xc	23 June 1864
An Act for making a Railway from the Lynn and Hunstanton Railway at Heacham to the Great Eastern Railway at Wells, to be called "The West Norfolk Junction Railway," all in the County of Norfolk.
West Riding and Grimsby Railway Act 1864	27 & 28 Vict. c. xci	23 June 1864
An Act to enable the West Riding and Grimsby Railway Company to make a Station at Wakefield, and for other Purposes with relation to that Company.
Ulverston Gas Act 1864	27 & 28 Vict. c. xcii	23 June 1864
An Act for incorporating the Ulverston Gaslight and Coke Company, and for conferring upon them further Powers for the Supply of Gas to the Township of Ulverston, and certain neighbouring Townships and Parishes, in the County of Lancaster.
Kent Coast Railway Act 1864	27 & 28 Vict. c. xciii	23 June 1864
An Act to empower the Kent Coast Railway Company to acquire additional Lands, and to raise more Money, and to make further Provision for the Lease of their Undertaking to the London, Chatham, and Dover Railway Company; and for other Purposes.
Crystal Palace and South London Junction Railway Act 1864	27 & 28 Vict. c. xciv	23 June 1864
An Act to empower the Crystal Palace and South London Junction Railway Company to make a Railway to connect their authorized Railway with the Greenwich Line of the London, Chatham, and Dover Railway Company, and to let or transfer their Undertaking to the London, Chatham, and Dover Railway Company; and for other Purposes.
Great Eastern Railway (Highbeech Branch) Act 1864	27 & 28 Vict. c. xcv	23 June 1864
An Act to authorize the Great Eastern Railway Company to make a Railway from their Loughton Line to near Highbeech Green in Epping Forest.
London, Chatham and Dover Railway (Steam Boats) Act 1864	27 & 28 Vict. c. xcvi	23 June 1864
An Act to authorize the London, Chatham, and Dover Railway Company to run Steam Vessels between Ramsgate and certain Foreign Ports, and to provide Accommodation for Steam Boat Traffic at Ramsgate and Dover, and for incidental Purposes.
Oswestry, Ellesmere and Whitchurch Railway Act 1864	27 & 28 Vict. c. xcvii	23 June 1864
An Act for authorizing the Oswestry, Ellesmere, and Whitchurch Railway Company to raise a further Sum of Money.
South Eastern Railway (Extension to Westerham) Act 1864	27 & 28 Vict. c. xcviii	23 June 1864
An Act for authorizing the South-eastern Railway Company to make and maintain an Extension of their Railway to Westerham, and to raise further Monies; and for other Purposes.
South Eastern Railway (Extensions to Cranbrook, Hythe, &c.) Act 1864	27 & 28 Vict. c. xcix	23 June 1864
An Act for authorizing the South-eastern Railway Company to make and maintain Extensions of their Railway to Cranbrook, Hythe, and Sandgate respectively, and to raise further Monies; and for other Purposes.
North British Railway (Perth Station) Act 1864	27 & 28 Vict. c. c	23 June 1864
An Act to sanction an Agreement between the North British Railway Company and the Scottish Central Railway Company with respect to the General Station at Perth; and for other Purposes.
Witney Railway Act 1864	27 & 28 Vict. c. ci	23 June 1864
An Act to enable the Witney Railway Company to raise a further Sum of Money; and for other Purposes.
Newcastle-upon-Tyne and North Shields Road Act 1864	27 & 28 Vict. c. cii	23 June 1864
An Act for repairing the Road from North Shields in the County of Northumberland to the Town of Newcastle-upon-Tyne, and for other Purposes.
Wellington (Salop) Market Act 1864	27 & 28 Vict. c. ciii	23 June 1864
An Act to incorporate a Company for holding Markets and Fairs in the Town and Parish of Wellington in the County of Salop; and for other Purposes.
Mytholmroyd Bridge and Blackstone Edge Turnpike Road Act 1864	27 & 28 Vict. c. civ	23 June 1864
An Act to grant a further Term in the Road from or near Mytholm Royd Bridge in the West Riding of the County of York communicating with the Road at or near to the Sixth Milestone from Rochdale in the County of Lancaster, and further Powers for the Management thereof; to alter the Rights of the existing Creditors of the Trust, and to repeal the existing Act; (Note: Mytholmroyd Bridge and Rochdale Turnpike Road Act 1832 (2 & 3 Will. 4. c. xix)) and for other Purposes.
Workington Harbour Act 1864 (repealed)	27 & 28 Vict. c. cv	23 June 1864
An Act to amend the Act 3 Victoria, Chapter 44., (Note: Workington Harbour Act 1840 (3 & 4 Vict. c. xliv)) for regulating and preserving the Harbour of Workington in the County of Cumberland, in relation to the Securities to be granted for borrowed Money; and for other Purposes. (Repealed by Workington Harbour and Dock (Transfer) Act 1957 (5 & 6 Eliz. 2. c. xxxii))
Belfast and Northern Counties Railway Act 1864	27 & 28 Vict. c. cvi	23 June 1864
An Act to enable the Belfast and Northern Counties Railway Company to make a Railway or Tramway at Portrush; and to purchase additional Lands; and to extend the Period at present limited for the Sale of certain superfluous Lands of the said Company; and for other Purposes.
North Cheshire Water Act 1864	27 & 28 Vict. c. cvii	23 June 1864
An Act to incorporate the Proprietors of the North Cheshire Waterworks Company, Limited, and to confer on them further Powers for the Supply of Water; and for other Purposes.
Lancaster Local Board of Health Act 1864	27 & 28 Vict. c. cviii	23 June 1864
An Act for enabling the Local Board of Health for the Borough of Lancaster to construct and maintain an improved System of Waterworks for the Supply of the Borough and of adjacent Places with Water; to authorize certain Street Improvements in the Borough of Lancaster; and to give Powers of Sale or Mortgage over Lancaster Marsh; and for other Purposes.
Nottingham Gas Act 1864 (repealed)	27 & 28 Vict. c. cix	23 June 1864
An Act to grant further Powers to the Nottingham Gaslight and Coke Company. (Repealed by Statute Law (Repeals) Act 1995 (c. 44))
Stockton and Middlesbrough Waterworks Act 1864	27 & 28 Vict. c. cx	23 June 1864
An Act to enable the Stockton and Middlesbrough Waterworks Company to extend their Limits for the Supply of Water; to construct additional Works; to raise additional Capital; to alter and amend their existing Act; (Note: Stockton and Middlesbrough Waterworks Act 1858 (21 & 22 Vict. c. cxxxiii)) and for other Purposes.
Denburn Valley Railway Act 1864	27 & 28 Vict. c. cxi	23 June 1864
An Act to authorize the Scottish North-eastern Railway Company to construct a Railway to connect their Railway with the Great North of Scotland Railway at Aberdeen; to confer Powers and Obligations on them, and on the Great North of Scotland Railway Company; and for other Purposes.
Downs Docks (Kent) Act 1864	27 & 28 Vict. c. cxii	23 June 1864
An Act to authorize the Construction of a Dock, Piers, a Railway, and other Works at or near Deal, and a navigable Channel therefrom to Sandwich, all in the County of Kent; and for other Purposes.
North and South Western Junction Railway Act 1864	27 & 28 Vict. c. cxiii	23 June 1864
An Act for authorizing the North and South Western Junction Railway Company to acquire additional Lands for the Purposes of their Undertaking; and to raise further Monies; and for other Purposes.
Okehampton Railway Act 1864	27 & 28 Vict. c. cxiv	23 June 1864
An Act for authorizing the Okehampton Railway Company to make certain Deviations from their authorized Lines; and for other Purposes.
Scottish North Eastern Railway (Newtyle and Meigle Junction) Act 1864	27 & 28 Vict. c. cxv	23 June 1864
An Act to enable the Scottish North-eastern Railway Company to make a new Railway from Newtyle to the Meigle Station on the Scottish North-eastern Railway; and for other Purposes.
Liverpool and London and Globe Insurance Company's Act 1864	27 & 28 Vict. c. cxvi	23 June 1864
An Act to confirm an Agreement for the Amalgamation of the Globe Insurance Company with the Liverpool and London Fire and Life Insurance Company, and to alter the Name of the last mentioned Company; and for other Purposes.
Wallasey Improvement Act 1864 (repealed)	27 & 28 Vict. c. cxvii	23 June 1864
An Act to confer further Powers on the Wallasey Local Board; and for other Purposes. (Repealed by County of Merseyside Act 1980 (c. x))
Newcastle-under-Lyme Canal (Lease) Act 1864	27 & 28 Vict. c. cxviii	23 June 1864
An Act for vesting, by way of Lease in perpetuity, the Newcastle-under-Lyme Canal, and the Canal Extension Railway belonging thereto, in the North Staffordshire Railway Company; and for other Purposes.
Shrewsbury Bridges Act 1864	27 & 28 Vict. c. cxix	23 June 1864
An Act for erecting and maintaining Bridges over the River Severn near Shrewsbury, and for making convenient Approaches thereto.
Lymington Harbour and Docks Act 1864	27 & 28 Vict. c. cxx	23 June 1864
An Act for incorporating "The Lymington Harbour and Docks Company," and authorizing them to make and maintain the Lymington Harbour and Docks, and a Railway and other Works in connexion therewith; and for other Purposes.
Whitehaven Waterworks Act 1864	27 & 28 Vict. c. cxxi	23 June 1864
An Act for better supplying with Water the Town of Whitehaven and its Neighbourhood; and for other Purposes.
East Norfolk Railway Act 1864	27 & 28 Vict. c. cxxii	23 June 1864
An Act to authorize the making of a Railway from the Great Eastern Railway to North Walsham in the County of Norfolk; and for other Purposes.
London, Brighton and South Coast Railway (Ouse Valley Line) Act 1864	27 & 28 Vict. c. cxxiii	23 June 1864
An Act to enable the London, Brighton, and South Coast Railway Company to make new Railways from the Ouse Viaduct on their Main Line to Uckfield and Hailsham; and for other Purposes.
Royston and Hitchin Railway Act 1864	27 & 28 Vict. c. cxxiv	23 June 1864
An Act to enable the Great Northern Railway Company to use certain Portions of the Great Eastern Railway, and to make Arrangements with the Great Eastern Railway Company.
Railway Passengers Assurance Company's Act 1864 (repealed)	27 & 28 Vict. c. cxxv	23 June 1864
An Act to amend the Railway Passengers Assurance Company's Act, 1852, (Note: Railway Passengers Assurance Company's Act 1852 (15 & 16 Vict. c. c)) and to confer additional Powers upon the said Company. (Repealed by Railway Passengers Assurance (Consolidation) Act 1892 (55 & 56 Vict. c. viii))
Dublin, Wicklow and Wexford Railway Act 1864	27 & 28 Vict. c. cxxvi	23 June 1864
An Act for authorizing a Deviation and Extensions of the Dublin, Wicklow, and Wexford Railway; and for other Purposes.
Falmouth Docks Act 1864 (repealed)	27 & 28 Vict. c. cxxvii	30 June 1864
An Act for authorizing the Falmouth Docks Company to make and maintain additional Works, and to raise further Monies; and for other Purposes. (Repealed by Falmouth Docks Act 1959 (7 & 8 Eliz. 2. c. xl))
West Shropshire Mineral Railway (New Lines) Act 1864	27 & 28 Vict. c. cxxviii	30 June 1864
An Act to enable the West Shropshire Mineral Railway Company to make certain new Lines of Railway, and to use a Portion of the Oswestry and Newtown Railway and the Llanymynech Station of that Railway; and for other Purposes.
Sevenoaks, Maidstone and Tonbridge Railway Act 1864	27 & 28 Vict. c. cxxix	30 June 1864
An Act to authorize the Consolidation of the separate Capitals of the Sevenoaks, Maidstone, and Tunbridge Railway Company; to extend the existing Arrangements between them and the London, Chatham, and Dover Railway Company; to authorize the Sale or Lease of their Undertaking to that Company; and for other Purposes.
Pneumatic Despatch Company's Act 1864	27 & 28 Vict. c. cxxx	30 June 1864
An Act for enabling the Pneumatic Despatch Company (Limited) to purchase Lands and extend their Works.
Tralee Canal Act 1864	27 & 28 Vict. c. cxxxi	30 June 1864
An Act for empowering the Commissioners of the Harbour of Tralee to raise Money, and for other Purposes.
Glasgow and Paisley Joint Railway Act 1864	27 & 28 Vict. c. cxxxii	30 June 1864
An Act to enable the Glasgow and South-western and the Caledonian Railway Companies to make certain Branches and other Works, and to acquire additional Lands in connexion with their Joint Line of Railway between Glasgow and Paisley; and for other Purposes.
Stewartry of Kircudbright Roads Act 1864	27 & 28 Vict. c. cxxxiii	30 June 1864
An Act for maintaining the public Roads and Bridges in the Stewartry of Kirkcudbright.
Henley-in-Arden Railway Act 1864	27 & 28 Vict. c. cxxxiv	30 June 1864
An Act to extend the Time for completing the Henley-in-Arden Railway, and to raise additional Capital.
Thames Embankment Amendment Act 1864 (repealed)	27 & 28 Vict. c. cxxxv	30 June 1864
An Act to enable the Metropolitan Board of Works to purchase additional Lands and to make further Improvements in the Parish of Saint Mary, Lambeth, in the County of Surrey, for the Purposes of "The Thames Embankment Act, 1863." (Note: Thames Embankment Act 1863 (26 & 27 Vict. c. 75)) (Repealed by Local Law (Greater London Council and Inner London Boroughs) Order 1965 (SI 1965/540))
Bristol and South Wales Union Railway Act 1864	27 & 28 Vict. c. cxxxvi	30 June 1864
An Act to extend the Time for the Purchase of Land and completing the Extension Line to the River Avon of the Bristol and South Wales Union Railway; to authorize the Purchase of additional Lands; and for other Purposes.
Bolton Gas Company's Act 1864	27 & 28 Vict. c. cxxxvii	30 June 1864
An Act for extending the Limits of the Bolton Gas Company's Act, 1854, (Note: Bolton Gas Company's Act 1854 (17 & 18 Vict. c. xx)) and for other Purposes.
Bolton and St. Helens Turnpike Roads Act 1864	27 & 28 Vict. c. cxxxviii	30 June 1864
An Act for the Amendment of the Bolton and Saint Helen's Turnpike Roads Act, 1860. (Note: Bolton and St. Helens Turnpike Roads Act 1860 (23 & 24 Vict. c. cxiii))
Zetland Roads Act 1864	27 & 28 Vict. c. cxxxix	30 June 1864
An Act to make Provision for the Maintenance and Management of public Roads in Zetland.
Port Glasgow Harbour Consolidation Act 1864 (repealed)	27 & 28 Vict. c. cxl	30 June 1864
An Act to consolidate and amend the Acts relating to the Harbour of Port Glasgow. (Repealed by Port Glasgow Burgh and Harbour Order Confirmation Act 1939 (2 & 3 Geo. 6. c. lxix))
South London Market Act 1864 (repealed)	27 & 28 Vict. c. cxli	30 June 1864
An Act for making and maintaining a Market in the Parish of St. George the Martyr, Southwark, in the County of Surrey. (Repealed by Statute Law (Repeals) Act 2013 (c. 2))
Mid Wales Railway Act 1864	27 & 28 Vict. c. cxlii	30 June 1864
An Act to enable the Mid Wales Railway Company to make a Railway to join the Central Wales Extension Rail way in the Parish of Llanelwedd in the County of Radnor; and to confer upon the said Company further Powers with respect to Roads crossed by their Railway, and with respect to the Purchase of Lands; and to enable the said Company to let their Railway on Lease; and to raise further Sums; and for other Purposes.
Halifax and Ovenden Junction Railway Act 1864	27 & 28 Vict. c. cxliii	30 June 1864
An Act for authorizing the Construction of a Railway, to be called "The Halifax and Ovenden Junction Railway;" and for other Purposes.
Mistley, Thorpe and Walton Railway (Branch) Act 1864	27 & 28 Vict. c. cxliv	30 June 1864
An Act to authorize the Mistley, Thorpe, and Walton Railway Company to make a Railway to connect their Line with an authorized Extension of the Tendring Hundred Railway Company; and for other Purposes.
Liverpool Exchange Act 1864 (repealed)	27 & 28 Vict. c. cxlv	30 June 1864
An Act for making further Provision with respect to the Liverpool Exchange Buildings and the Exchange Area, and for authorizing the Liverpool Exchange Company to raise further Monies; and for other Purposes. (Repealed by Liverpool Exchange Act 1988 (c. ix))
Kent Waterworks Act 1864	27 & 28 Vict. c. cxlvi	30 June 1864
An Act for the Amalgamation of the North Kent Waterworks Company and their Undertaking and Property with the Kent Waterworks Company and their Undertaking and Property, and for the Dissolution of the North Kent Waterworks Company; and for authorizing the Kent Waterworks Company to raise further Monies; and for other Purposes.
Aberystwith and Welsh Coast Railway (General) Act 1864 or the Aberystwyth and Welsh Coast Railway (General) Act 1864	27 & 28 Vict. c. cxlvii	30 June 1864
An Act for authorizing the Aberystwith and Welsh Coast Railway Company to acquire additional Lands, and to raise further Monies; and for authorizing the Oswestry and Newtown Railway Company to contribute further Monies towards the Funds of that Company; and for other Purposes.
Newcastle-upon-Tyne and Gateshead Gas Act 1864	27 & 28 Vict. c. cxlviii	30 June 1864
An Act to re-incorporate the Newcastle-upon-Tyne and Gateshead Union Gaslight Company, and to make better Provision for lighting with Gas the Boroughs of Newcastle-upon-Tyne and Gateshead, and several neighbouring Parishes and Townships in the Counties of Northumberland and Durham; and for other Purposes.
Garstang and Knot End Railway Act 1864	27 & 28 Vict. c. cxlix	30 June 1864
An Act for incorporating a Company for making a Railway in the County of Lancaster, to be called "The Garstang and Knot End Railway;" and for other Purposes.
Globe Telegraph Act 1864	27 & 28 Vict. c. cl	30 June 1864
An Act to authorize the Globe Telegraph Company (Limited) to construct and maintain Telegraphs; to acquire and work Letters Patent relating to Electro-magnetic Telegraphs and Apparatus; and for other Purposes.
Severn Valley Railway Act 1864	27 & 28 Vict. c. cli	30 June 1864
An Act to authorize the Severn Valley Railway Company to raise further Sums of Money, and to make certain Works in connexion with their Railway; and for other Purposes.
Nantwich and Market Drayton Railway Act 1864	27 & 28 Vict. c. clii	30 June 1864
An Act to enable the Nantwich and Market Drayton Railway Company to increase their Capital; and for other Purposes.
Edinburgh and Leith Sewerage Act 1864 (repealed)	27 & 28 Vict. c. cliii	30 June 1864
An Act for the Purification of the Water of Leith, by Interception and Conveyance into the Sea of the Sewage falling into the same, and otherwise; and for other Purposes. (Repealed by Water of Leith Purification and Sewerage Act 1889 (52 & 53 Vict. c. cvi))
London, Brighton and South Coast Railway Company (Steamboats) Act 1864	27 & 28 Vict. c. cliv	30 June 1864
An Act to authorize the London, Brighton, and South Coast Railway Company to run Steam Vessels between Littlehampton, Places on the Coast of France, and in the Channel Islands.
Weston-super-Mare Pier (Extension) Act 1864	27 & 28 Vict. c. clv	30 June 1864
An Act for enlarging the Powers of "The Weston-super-Mare Pier Act, 1862;" (Note: Weston-super-Mare Pier Act 1862 (25 & 26 Vict. c. clxix)) and for other Purposes.
Shrewsbury and North Wales Railway Act 1864	27 & 28 Vict. c. clvi	30 June 1864
An Act to change the Name of the West Shropshire Mineral Railway Company, and to enable them to make Branch Railways and a Deviation, and to alter the Line and Levels of their Railway; and to confer upon the said Company further Powers for making, crossing, and altering public Roads, and for the Purchase of additional Lands; and for other Purposes.
East Indian Railway Company's Act 1864 (repealed)	27 & 28 Vict. c. clvii	30 June 1864
An Act to amend the Acts relating to the East Indian Railway Company, and to authorize the Company to raise further Capital; and for other Purposes connected with their Undertaking. (Repealed by Statute Law (Repeals) Act 2013 (c. 2))
Solway Junction Railway Act 1864	27 & 28 Vict. c. clviii	30 June 1864
An Act for making a Railway from the Caledonian Railway, near Kirtlebridge Station, to the Maryport and Carlisle Railway, near Brayton Station, with Branch Railways in connexion therewith, in the Counties of Dumfries and Cumberland; and for other Purposes.
Phœnix Gas Act 1864	27 & 28 Vict. c. clix	30 June 1864
An Act to amend the Act (Note: Phœnix Gas Act 1824 (5 Geo. 4. c. lxxviii)) relating to the Phœnix Gas Company, and to authorize such Company to raise more Capital, and purchase a certain Piece of Land; and for other Purposes.
Wallasey Embankment Act 1864 (repealed)	27 & 28 Vict. c. clx	14 July 1864
An Act to make further Provision for the Maintenance and Repair of the Wallasey Embankment; and for other Purposes. (Repealed by County of Merseyside Act 1980 (c. x))
Oswestry and Newtown Railway Act 1864	27 & 28 Vict. c. clxi	14 July 1864
An Act to authorize the Oswestry and Newtown Railway Company to subscribe to the Bishop's Castle Railway; and for other Purposes.
Independent Gaslight and Coke Company Act 1864	27 & 28 Vict. c. clxii	14 July 1864
An Act to enable the Independent Gaslight and Coke Company to raise additional Capital; to define their Limits for supplying Gas; to repeal amend and extend the Act (Note: Independent Gaslight and Coke Company Act 1829 (10 Geo. 4. c. cxviii)) relating to the Company; and for other Purposes.
Newquay and Cornwall Junction Railway Act 1864	27 & 28 Vict. c. clxiii	14 July 1864
An Act for making a Railway from the Cornwall Railway near Burngullow, to the Saint Dennis Branch of the Newquay Railway, near Hendra, in the County of Cornwall; and for other Purposes.
Midland Railway (Bath and Thornbury Lines) Act 1864	27 & 28 Vict. c. clxiv	14 July 1864
An Act for the Construction by the Midland Railway Company of new Railways from their Bristol and Birmingham Line to the City of Bath and to Thornbury; and for other Purposes.
Leeds, Bradford and Halifax Junction Railway Act 1864	27 & 28 Vict. c. clxv	14 July 1864
An Act for enabling the Leeds, Bradford, and Halifax Junction Railway Company to construct new Works and acquire additional Lands in the West Riding of the County of York; and for other Purposes.
London and South-western (Kensington and Richmond) Railway Act 1864 or the London and South Western Railway (Kensington and Richmond) Act 1864	27 & 28 Vict. c. clxvi	14 July 1864
An Act for authorizing the London and South-western Railway Company to make and maintain a Line of Railway from Kensington to Richmond, and Junction Lines communicating with the Hammersmith and City Railway and the North and South Western Junction Railway respectively; and to raise further Monies; and for authorizing Arrangements with divers Railway Companies; and for other Purposes.
Rammell's Patent Act 1864	27 & 28 Vict. c. clxvii	14 July 1864
An Act for rendering valid Letters Patent granted to Thomas Webster Rammell for "Improvements in Pneumatic Railways and Tubes."
Durham University Act 1864	27 & 28 Vict. c. clxviii	14 July 1864
An Act to provide for the Discharge by Deputy in certain Cases of the Functions of Warden in the University of Durham; and to authorize the Abolition of certain Fellowships in the said University; and to provide a further Endowment for the School of Theology, and a proposed School of Physical Science, in the said University; and for other Purposes.
Furness Gas and Waterworks Act 1864	27 & 28 Vict. c. clxix	14 July 1864
An Act for supplying and lighting with Gas and supplying with Water the Town of Barrow-in-Furness, and the Townships of Above Town, Ireleth, Lindal, and Martin, Dalton, Dalton Proper, Yarlside, Hawcoat, and Saint George's Barrow, in the Parish of Dalton-in-Furness in the County Palatine of Lancaster; and for other Purposes.
Bodmin Railway Act 1864 (repealed)	27 & 28 Vict. c. clxx	14 July 1864
An Act for making a Railway from the Cornwall Railway to Bodmin. (Repealed by Statute Law (Repeals) Act 2013 (c. 2))
Worcester, Bromyard and Leominster Railway Act 1864	27 & 28 Vict. c. clxxi	14 July 1864
An Act to authorize the Worcester, Bromyard, and Leominster Railway Company to purchase additional Lands; to extend the Time limited for the Purchase of Lands and for completing the Railway; and for other Purposes.
London, Brighton and South Coast Railway (Tunbridge Wells and Eastbourne Line) Act 1864	27 & 28 Vict. c. clxxii	14 July 1864
An Act to enable the London, Brighton, and South Coast Railway Company to provide improved Railway Communication between Tunbridge Wells and Eastbourne; and for other Purposes.
Scottish North Eastern Railway (Dundee and Forfar) Act 1864	27 & 28 Vict. c. clxxiii	14 July 1864
An Act to enable the Scottish North-eastern Railway Company to construct a new Line between Dundee and Forfar; to levy Tolls; to raise additional Capital; and for other Purposes.
Southampton and Netley Railway Act 1864	27 & 28 Vict. c. clxxiv	14 July 1864
An Act for authorizing an Alteration of the Southampton and Netley Railway, and the Amalgamation of the Southampton and Netley Railway with the London and South-western Railway; and for other Purposes.
Swansea and Aberystwith Junction Railway Act 1864 or the Swansea and Aberystwyth Junction Railway Act 1864	27 & 28 Vict. c. clxxv	14 July 1864
An Act to incorporate a Company for the making of Railways in the Counties of Carmarthen and Cardigan, to be called "The Swansea and Aberystwith Junction Railway."
Wellington and Drayton Railway Act 1864	27 & 28 Vict. c. clxxvi	14 July 1864
An Act to enable the Wellington and Drayton Railway Company to divert a Portion of their authorized Railway, and to transfer their Undertaking to the Great Western Railway Company.
Hayling Railway and Docks Act 1864	27 & 28 Vict. c. clxxvii	14 July 1864
An Act for enabling the Hayling Railways Company to make and maintain Railways in Extension of their authorized Railways, and to make and maintain Docks, and to raise Monies for the Purpose, and to make Arrangements with other Companies; and for other Purposes.
London and Saint Katharine Docks Act 1864 or the London and St. Katharine's Docks Act 1864 (repealed)	27 & 28 Vict. c. clxxviii	14 July 1864
An Act for the Amalgamation of the London Dock Company and the Saint Katharine Dock Company into One Company by the Name "The London and Saint Katharine Docks Company," and for the Transfer to that Company and the Amalgamation with their Undertaking and Docks of the Undertaking and Docks of the Victoria (London) Dock Company; and for other Purposes. (Repealed by Port of London (Consolidation) Act 1920 (10 & 11 Geo. 5. c. clxxiii))
Stockport and Ashton Roads Act 1864	27 & 28 Vict. c. clxxix	14 July 1864
An Act for the Stockport and Ashton Turnpike Roads in the Counties Palatine of Chester and Lancaster, and the County of York.
Wisbech Waterworks Act 1864	27 & 28 Vict. c. clxxx	14 July 1864
An Act for better supplying with Water the Borough of Wisbech, and certain Parishes and Places in the Counties of Cambridge and Norfolk; and for other Purposes.
Cheddar Valley and Yatton Railway Act 1864	27 & 28 Vict. c. clxxxi	14 July 1864
An Act for authorizing the making of Railways from the Railway of the Somerset and Dorset Railway Company at Wells to the Railway of the Bristol and Exeter Railway Company at Yatton, and Arrangements between those Companies in relation thereto; and for other Purposes.
Wensum Valley Railway Act 1864 (repealed)	27 & 28 Vict. c. clxxxii	14 July 1864
An Act for making Railways from the Great Eastern Railway at East Dereham to Norwich, to be called "The Wensum Valley Railway;" and for other Purposes. (Repealed by Statute Law (Repeals) Act 2013 (c. 2))
Pembroke and Tenby Railway (Extension) Act 1864	27 & 28 Vict. c. clxxxiii	14 July 1864
An Act to enable the Pembroke and Tenby Railway Company to construct new Lines of Railway; and for other Purposes.
Grand Western Canal Purchase Act 1864	27 & 28 Vict. c. clxxxiv	14 July 1864
An Act for the Sale to the Bristol and Exeter Railway Company of the Undertaking of the Company of Proprietors of the Grand Western Canal, and for the Abandonment of a Portion of the Canal; and for other Purposes.
Newry and Armagh Railway Amendment Act 1864	27 & 28 Vict. c. clxxxv	14 July 1864
An Act to enable the Newry and Armagh Railway Company to raise further Capital, and for other Purposes.
Caernarvon and Llanberis Railway Act 1864	27 & 28 Vict. c. clxxxvi	14 July 1864
An Act to authorize the Construction of a Railway from Carnarvon to Llanberis in the County of Carnarvon.
Fleetwood Docks Act 1864	27 & 28 Vict. c. clxxxvii	14 July 1864
An Act for the Construction of an Embankment, Docks, and other Works, and the Reclamation and Acquisition of Lands near Fleetwood in the County Palatine of Lancaster; and for other Purposes.
Vale of Crickhowell Railway Act 1864	27 & 28 Vict. c. clxxxviii	14 July 1864
An Act for making a Railway from the Merthyr, Tredegar, and Abergavenny Railway to Crickhowell; and for other Purposes.
Crieff and Methven Junction Railway Act 1864	27 & 28 Vict. c. clxxxix	14 July 1864
An Act for making a Railway from the Town of Crieff to the Perth, Almond Valley, and Methuen Railway near Methven; and for other Purposes.
Midland and South-western Junction Railway Act 1864	27 & 28 Vict. c. cxc	14 July 1864
An Act to authorize the Construction of a Railway in Middlesex, to be called "The Midland and South-western Junction Railway."
Londonderry Improvement Act 1864	27 & 28 Vict. c. cxci	14 July 1864
An Act for the Extension of the Municipal Limits of the City of Londonderry, and for the Increase of the Jurisdiction of the Court of Conscience there; and for the further Improvement of the City; and for raising further Monies; and for other Purposes.
Charing Cross Railway Act 1864	27 & 28 Vict. c. cxcii	14 July 1864
An Act for authorizing the Charing Cross Railway Company to acquire additional Lands at or near to their Cannon Street Station in the City of London, and to raise further Monies; and for other Purposes.
Peebleshire Roads Act 1864	27 & 28 Vict. c. cxciii	14 July 1864
An Act for more effectually maintaining, keeping in repair, and improving the Roads, Highways, and Bridges within the County of Peebles; and for other Purposes.
London and North Western Railway (Traffic Arrangements) Act 1864	27 & 28 Vict. c. cxciv	14 July 1864
An Act for affording increased Facilities for the Transmission of Traffic between the Railways of the London and North-western Railway Company and Railways in Ireland; and for other Purposes.
London, Chatham and Dover Railway (New Lines) Act 1864	27 & 28 Vict. c. cxcv	14 July 1864
An Act to authorize the London, Chatham, and Dover Railway Company to construct additional Works and acquire additional Lands; to alter the Works and Powers (connected with or affecting their Undertaking) of other Companies, Bodies, and Persons; and to amend the Acts relating to the above-named Company, to Dover and to Margate; and for other Purposes.
Shrewsbury and Welchpool Railway (Transfer) Act 1864 or the Shrewsbury and Welshpool Railway (Transfer) Act 1864	27 & 28 Vict. c. cxcvi	14 July 1864
An Act to authorize the Shrewsbury and Welchpool Railway Company to transfer or lease their Undertaking to the London and North-western Railway Company, or to the London and North-western and Great Western Railway Companies.
Helston and Penryn Junction Railway Act 1864 (repealed)	27 & 28 Vict. c. cxcvii	14 July 1864
An Act for making a Railway from Helston to Penryn in the County of Cornwall; and for other Purposes. (Repealed by Statute Law (Repeals) Act 2013 (c. 2))
Belfast Award Act 1864	27 & 28 Vict. c. cxcviii	14 July 1864
An Act for giving Effect to an Award relating to the Borough of Belfast, and for confirming Things done with a view to the Execution of the Acts for the Improvement of the Borough; and for other Purposes.
Kington and Eardisley Railway Act 1864	27 & 28 Vict. c. cxcix	14 July 1864
An Act to enable the Kington and Eardisley Railway Company to extend their authorized Line of Railway to Presteign, and to use a Portion of the Leominster and Kington Railway, and make Agreements with other Companies; and for other Purposes.
Southam Railway Act 1864	27 & 28 Vict. c. cc	14 July 1864
An Act for making a Railway from the Great Western Railway, near Harbury, to the London and North-western Railway, near Birdingbury, in the County of Warwick.
Bolton Improvement Act 1864	27 & 28 Vict. c. cci	14 July 1864
An Act to enable the Mayor, Aldermen, and Burgesses of the Borough of Bolton to construct additional Waterworks; to acquire the Turton and Entwisle Reservoir; to provide a public Park and Town Hall; and for other Purposes.
Great Northern Railway (No. 1) Act 1864	27 & 28 Vict. c. ccii	14 July 1864
An Act to enable the Great Northern Railway Company to extend their Railway to the Town of Barnet; to improve their Station at King's Cross; and for other Purposes.
Llanelly Harbour Act 1864	27 & 28 Vict. c. cciii	14 July 1864
An Act to further amend and extend the Acts for the Improvement of the Navigation of the Rivers Burry, Loughor, and Lliedi, in the Counties of Carmarthen and Glamorgan, and for the Improvement of the Harbour of Llanelly in the said County of Carmarthen; and to grant certain Powers to the Llanelly Railway and Dock Company and the South Wales Railway Company in relation to the Improvement of the said Harbour; and for other Purposes.
Macclesfield, Bollington and Marple Railway Act 1864	27 & 28 Vict. c. cciv	14 July 1864
An Act for incorporating a Company, and for making and maintaining the Macclesfield, Bollington, and Marple Railway; and for other Purposes.
Watford and Edgware Junction Railway Act 1864	27 & 28 Vict. c. ccv	14 July 1864
An Act to authorize the Construction of a Railway from the Watford and Rickmansworth Railway at Watford to the Edgware, Highgate, and London Railway at Edgware.
Argyllshire Roads Act 1864	27 & 28 Vict. c. ccvi	14 July 1864
An Act for making and maintaining Highways, Bridges, Quays, and Ferries; and for regulating Ferries in the Shire of Argyll.
Sunningdale and Cambridge Town Railway Act 1864 (repealed)	27 & 28 Vict. c. ccvii	14 July 1864
An Act for making a Railway from the Staines, Wokingham, and Woking Railway to Cambridge Town in the County of Surrey and for other Purposes. (Repealed by Statute Law (Repeals) Act 2013 (c. 2))
Ardrossan Harbour Consolidation Act 1864	27 & 28 Vict. c. ccviii	14 July 1864
An Act to consolidate and amend the Acts relating to the Harbour of Ardrossan, and to provide for the Improvement of the said Harbour.
Whitby Waterworks Act 1864	27 & 28 Vict. c. ccix	25 July 1864
An Act to enable "The Whitby Waterworks Company (Limited)" to supply with Water the Town and Borough of Whitby, and the Neighbourhood thereof, in the Parish of Whitby in the North Riding of the County of York; and for other Purposes.
Bourton-on-the-Water Railway (Extension to Cheltenham) Act 1864 (repealed)	27 & 28 Vict. c. ccx	25 July 1864
An Act to extend the Bourton-on-the-Water Railway towards Cheltenham; to amend the Act (Note: Bourton-on-the-Water Railway Act 1860 (23 & 24 Vict. c. lxxxii)) relating to the Bourton-on-the-Water Railway Company; and for other Purposes. (Repealed by Statute Law (Repeals) Act 2013 (c. 2))
Isle of Wight Ferry Act 1864 (repealed)	27 & 28 Vict. c. ccxi	25 July 1864
An Act for enabling the Isle of Wight Ferry Company to raise additional Capital; and for other Purposes. (Repealed by Pier and Harbour Orders Confirmation Act 1916 (6 & 7 Geo. 5. c. xxxvii))
London, Chatham and Dover Railway (City Undertaking) Act 1864	27 & 28 Vict. c. ccxii	25 July 1864
An Act to form into a separate Undertaking Part of the City Lines of the London, Chatham, and Dover Railway Company, and to provide for a Contribution thereto by the Great Northern Railway Company, and to consolidate some of the Stocks and Shares of the first-named Company; and for other Purposes.
Mersey Docks Act 1864 (repealed)	27 & 28 Vict. c. ccxiii	25 July 1864
An Act to enable the Mersey Docks and Harbour Board to raise a further Sum of Money for the Purpose of increasing the Accommodation of the Dock Estate on the Liverpool Side of the River Mersey, and to make a Diversion of Derby and Victoria Roads; and for altering certain Rates; and for other Purposes. (Repealed by Mersey Docks and Harbour Act 1971 (c. lvii))
Scottish Central Railway (Dundee and Newtyle Improvement) Act 1864	27 & 28 Vict. c. ccxiv	25 July 1864
An Act to improve and extend the Dundee and Newtyle Railway; and for other Purposes.
Erith Tramways Act 1864	27 & 28 Vict. c. ccxv	25 July 1864
An Act for authorizing the Extension and Maintenance of Tramways in the Parish of Erith in the County of Kent; and for other Purposes.
Waterford and Wexford Railway and Harbour Act 1864	27 & 28 Vict. c. ccxvi	25 July 1864
An Act to authorize the Construction of a Railway and Branch Railway, to be called "The Waterford and Wexford Railway," and of a Harbour in Greenore Bay; and for other Purposes.
Aylesbury and Buckingham Railway Act 1864	27 & 28 Vict. c. ccxvii	25 July 1864
An Act to enable the Aylesbury and Buckingham Railway Company to raise a further Sum of Money; and for other Purposes.
Llanelly Railway and Dock (Further Powers) Act 1864	27 & 28 Vict. c. ccxviii	25 July 1864
An Act to extend the Powers of the Llanelly Railway and Dock Company.
London and Blackwall Railway Act 1864	27 & 28 Vict. c. ccxix	25 July 1864
An Act to authorize the London and Blackwall Railway Company to enlarge certain of their Stations and Works; and for other Purposes.
Stamford and Essendine Railway (Sibson Extension) Act 1864	27 & 28 Vict. c. ccxx	25 July 1864
An Act to authorize the Stamford and Essendine Railway Company to make a Railway from their Railway to join the Northampton and Peterborough Branch of the London and North-western Railway; and for other Purposes.
Tottenham and Hampstead Junction Railway Act 1864	27 & 28 Vict. c. ccxxi	25 July 1864
An Act for authorizing the Tottenham and Hampstead Junction Railway Company to make a Railway to join the Midland Railway; and for other Purposes.
Wilts and Gloucestershire Railway Act 1864 (repealed)	27 & 28 Vict. c. ccxxii	25 July 1864
An Act for making a Railway from Christian Malford in the County of Wilts to Nailsworth in the County of Gloucester; and for other Purposes. (Repealed by Statute Law (Repeals) Act 2013 (c. 2))
Somerset and Dorset Railway Act 1864	27 & 28 Vict. c. ccxxiii	25 July 1864
An Act for authorizing the Somerset and Dorset Railway Company to acquire additional Lands for the Purposes of their Undertaking; and to raise further Monies; and for other Purposes.
Carmarthenshire Railway Act 1864	27 & 28 Vict. c. ccxxiv	25 July 1864
An Act to incorporate a Company for making the Carmarthenshire Railway, and to confer other Powers with reference thereto.
Corris Railway Act 1864	27 & 28 Vict. c. ccxxv	25 July 1864
An Act to authorize the Corris, Machynlleth, and River Dovey Tramroad Company to make a new Railway; to abandon Part of their existing Undertaking; to amend their Act; (Note: Corris, Machynlleth, and River Dovey Tramroad Act 1858 (21 & 22 Vict. c. xcv)) and for other Purposes.
London and North Western Railway (Additional Powers) Act 1864	27 & 28 Vict. c. ccxxvi	25 July 1864
An Act for conferring additional Powers on the London and North-western Railway Company for the Construction of Works, and otherwise in relation to their own Undertaking and the Undertakings of other Companies; for authorizing the Abandonment of certain Railways; and for other Purposes.
South-western Railway (Various Powers) Act 1864	27 & 28 Vict. c. ccxxvii	25 July 1864
An Act for the Amalgamation of divers Railway Companies with the London and South-western Railway Company; for authorizing that Company to make and maintain additional Lines of Railway, and to raise further Monies; and for other Purposes.
Lough Swilly Railway (Extension) Act 1864	27 & 28 Vict. c. ccxxviii	25 July 1864
An Act to enable the Londonderry and Lough Swilly Railway Company to extend their Railway towards the City of Londonderry; to raise additional Capital; and for other Purposes.
Lynn and Sutton Railway (Cross Keys Bridge) Act 1864	27 & 28 Vict. c. ccxxix	25 July 1864
An Act to regulate the Use by the Lynn and Sutton Bridge Railway Company of the Cross Keys Bridge over the River Nene.
Midland Railway (Chesterfield to Sheffield) Act 1864	27 & 28 Vict. c. ccxxx	25 July 1864
An Act for enabling the Midland Railway Company to construct a Railway from Chesterfield to Sheffield; and for other Purposes.
Midland Railway (St. Pancras Branch) Act 1864	27 & 28 Vict. c. ccxxxi	25 July 1864
An Act for enabling the Midland Railway Company to construct a Branch Railway in the Parish of Saint Pancras; for authorizing Arrangements with the Metropolitan Railway Company; and for other Purposes.
North Staffordshire Railway (Tunstall Line) Act 1864	27 & 28 Vict. c. ccxxxii	25 July 1864
An Act for making a Railway from the Potteries Line of the North Staffordshire Railway to near Tunstall in the Parish of Wolstanton in the County of Stafford; and for other Purposes.
Weald of Kent Railway Act 1864 (repealed)	27 & 28 Vict. c. ccxxxiii	25 July 1864
An Act to authorize the Construction of a Railway from Hartley and Cranbrook to Tenterden in the County of Kent; and for other Purposes. (Repealed by Statute Law (Repeals) Act 2013 (c. 2))
Wrexham, Mold and Connah's Quay Railway (Extension) Act 1864	27 & 28 Vict. c. ccxxxiv	25 July 1864
An Act for the Extension of the Wrexham, Mold, and Connah's Quay Railway to Whitchurch and Brymbo; and for other Purposes.
Albert Bridge Act 1864	27 & 28 Vict. c. ccxxxv	25 July 1864
An Act to incorporate a Company for making a new Bridge from Chelsea to Battersea, with Approaches thereto.
Waterford and Limerick, Limerick and Foynes, and Rathkeale and Newcastle Junction Railways Act 1864	27 & 28 Vict. c. ccxxxvi	25 July 1864
An Act for authorizing the Waterford and Limerick Railway Company to work the Undertaking of the Rathkeale and Newcastle Junction Railway Company; and for other Purposes.
West London Docks and Warehouses Act 1864	27 & 28 Vict. c. ccxxxvii	25 July 1864
An Act for authorizing the West London Docks and Warehouses Company to execute further Works, and to make Arrangements with other Companies; to raise further Monies; and for other Purposes.
Wandsworth Bridge Act 1864	27 & 28 Vict. c. ccxxxviii	25 July 1864
An Act for incorporating the Wandsworth Bridge Company, and for authorizing them to make and maintain the Wandsworth Bridge, and to make Roads leading thereto; and for other Purposes.
Birmingham and Staffordshire Gas Act 1864 (repealed)	27 & 28 Vict. c. ccxxxix	25 July 1864
An Act to enlarge the Powers of the Birmingham and Staffordshire Gaslight Company; and for other Purposes. (Repealed by Birmingham Corporation (Consolidation) Act 1883 (46 & 47 Vict. c. lxx))
Peterborough, Wisbeach, and Sutton Railway Act 1864	27 & 28 Vict. c. ccxl	25 July 1864
An Act for authorizing the Peterborough, Wisbeach, and Sutton Railway Company to extend their Line of Railway; and for other Purposes.
Bristol Port and Channel Dock Act 1864	27 & 28 Vict. c. ccxli	25 July 1864
An Act to authorize the Construction of a Dock and other Works near the Mouth of the River Avon, to be called "The Bristol Port and Channel Dock;" and for other Purposes.
Great Northern Railway (Lincoln to Bourn) Act 1864	27 & 28 Vict. c. ccxlii	25 July 1864
An Act to enable the Great Northern Railway Company to extend their Railway from Lincoln to Sleaford; and to authorize the Amalgamation of the Boston, Sleaford, and Midland Counties Railway and the Bourn and Essendine Railway with the Great Northern Railway.
Great Northern Railway (Doncaster to Gainsborough) Act 1864	27 & 28 Vict. c. ccxliii	25 July 1864
An Act to enable the Great Northern Railway Company to complete their Loop Line between Doncaster and Gainsborough; and to improve the Gradients of their Railway South of Gainsborough.
Blyth and Tyne Railway Act 1864	27 & 28 Vict. c. ccxliv	25 July 1864
An Act to enable the Blyth and Tyne Railway Company to raise further Sums of Money; to extend the Time limited in respect of certain of their authorized Branches; and for other Purposes.
Midland Railway (New Lines and Additional Powers) Act 1864	27 & 28 Vict. c. ccxlv	25 July 1864
An Act for enabling the Midland Railway Company to construct new Railways and Works, and to acquire additional Lands; and for other Purposes.
North London Railway (Additional Powers) Act 1864	27 & 28 Vict. c. ccxlvi	25 July 1864
An Act to empower the North London Railway Company to construct additional Works at Poplar; and for other Purposes.
Torbay and Brixham Railway Act 1864	27 & 28 Vict. c. ccxlvii	25 July 1864
An Act for making a Railway from the Dartmouth and Torbay Railway at Brixham Road Station to Brixham in the County of Devon, and a Tramway in connexion therewith; and for other Purposes.
Clyde Navigation (Glasgow Harbour Tramways) Act 1864	27 & 28 Vict. c. ccxlviii	25 July 1864
An Act to enable the Trustees of the Clyde Navigation to lay down Lines of Rails or Tramways upon and in connexion with the Quays at the Harbour of Glasgow, and to borrow additional Money; to alter certain of the Rates leviable by them; and for other Purposes.
Exmouth and Budleigh Salterton Waterworks Act 1864	27 & 28 Vict. c. ccxlix	25 July 1864
An Act for better supplying with Water Exmouth, Budleigh Salterton, and the adjoining Districts within the Parishes of Littleham and Exmouth, Withycombe Raleigh, and East Budleigh, in the County of Devon.
Caledonian and Hamilton and Strathaven Railway Amalgamation Act 1864	27 & 28 Vict. c. ccl	25 July 1864
An Act to authorize the Amalgamation of the Hamilton and Strathaven Railway Company with the Caledonian Railway Company; and for other Purposes.
West Grinstead, Cuckfield and Hayward's Heath Junction Railway Act 1864 (repealed)	27 & 28 Vict. c. ccli	25 July 1864
An Act for the Incorporation of "The West Grinstead, Cuckfield, and Hayward's Heath Junction Railway Company," and the making and maintaining of "The West Grinstead, Cuckfield, and Hayward's Heath Junction Railway;" and for other Purposes. (Repealed by Statute Law (Repeals) Act 2013 (c. 2))
Great Northern and Western (of Ireland) Railway (Capital) Act 1864	27 & 28 Vict. c. cclii	25 July 1864
An Act to enable the Great Northern and Western (of Ireland) Railway Company to raise a further Sum of Money.
Irish North-western Railway Act 1864	27 & 28 Vict. c. ccliii	25 July 1864
An Act for the Discharge of Debts of the Irish North-western Railway Company; and for authorizing divers Arrangements between that Company and other Railway Companies; and for other Purposes.
Belfast Central Railway Act 1864	27 & 28 Vict. c. ccliv	25 July 1864
An Act to incorporate a Company for making Railways to connect the several Railways in the Town of Belfast, and to construct a Central Station in Belfast; and for other Purposes.
Millwall Canal, Wharfs and Graving Docks Act 1864 (repealed)	27 & 28 Vict. c. cclv	25 July 1864
An Act for incorporating "The Millwall Canal Company," and for authorizing them to make and maintain Canals and other Works in the Isle of Dogs, and thereby, and by the Appropriation of Works and Lands there, to provide Accommodation for Shipping and Waterside Accommodation for Shipbuilding and other Businesses requiring Water Frontage; and for other Purposes. (Repealed by Port of London (Consolidation) Act 1920 (10 & 11 Geo. 5. c. clxxiii))
Hubberston Docks Act 1864	27 & 28 Vict. c. cclvi	25 July 1864
An Act for authorizing the Construction of Docks and other Works upon or near Hubberston Pill at Milford Haven in the County of Pembroke; and for other Purposes.
Bristol Port Extension Railways Act 1864	27 & 28 Vict. c. cclvii	25 July 1864
An Act for making Extension or Connecting Lines of Railway in the City of Bristol; and for other Purposes.
Buckfastleigh, Totnes and South Devon Railway Act 1864	27 & 28 Vict. c. cclviii	25 July 1864
An Act for incorporating a Company for making a Railway in the County of Devon, to be called "The Buckfastleigh, Totnes, and South Devon Railway;" and for other Purposes.
County and General Gas Consumers Company (Lea Bridge District) Act 1864	27 & 28 Vict. c. cclix	25 July 1864
An Act for better lighting with Gas Parts of the Parishes of Walthamstow and Leyton in the County of Essex, and for conferring further Powers in relation thereto on the County and General Gas Consumers Company (Limited); and for other Purposes.
Metropolitan Railway (Additional Powers) Act 1864 or the Metropolitan Railway Act 1864	27 & 28 Vict. c. cclx	25 July 1864
An Act for enabling the Metropolitan Railway Company to make additional Works; for extending the Time limited for the compulsory Purchase of Lands and Completion of certain Works; for authorizing the raising of additional Capital; and for other Purposes.
County and General Gas Consumers Company (Northfleet District) Act 1864	27 & 28 Vict. c. cclxi	25 July 1864
An Act for better lighting with Gas Parts of the Parishes of Northfleet, Stone, and Swanscombe, in the County of Kent, and for conferring further Powers in relation thereto on the County and General Gas Consumers Company (Limited); and for other Purposes.
Cambrian Railways Act 1864	27 & 28 Vict. c. cclxii	25 July 1864
An Act to amalgamate the Oswestry and Newtown, Llanidloes and Newtown, Newtown and Machynlleth, and Oswestry, Ellesmere and Whitchurch Railway Companies; and to confer Powers upon the amalgamated and other Companies.
Oswestry and Newtown and other Railway Companies (Arrangements) Act 1864	27 & 28 Vict. c. cclxiii	25 July 1864
An Act to authorize Agreements between the Oswestry and Newtown, the Llanidloes and Newtown, the Oswestry, Ellesmere, and Whitchurch, the Newtown and Machynlleth, the Hereford, Hay, and Brecon, the Brecon and Merthyr Tydfil, and the London and North-western Railway Companies; and for other Purposes.
Rhymney Railway (Cardiff and Caerphilly) Act 1864	27 & 28 Vict. c. cclxiv	25 July 1864
An Act for authorizing the Rhymney Railway Company to make and maintain their Cardiff and Caerphilly and other Railways; and for other Purposes.
Brecon and Merthyr Railway (No. 1) Act 1864	27 & 28 Vict. c. cclxv	25 July 1864
An Act to authorize certain Deviations from the existing and authorized Lines of the Brecon and Merthyr Tydfil Junction Railway Company, and to empower that Company to form a Junction with the Limestone Railway of the Rhymney Iron Company, and (instead of the Vale of Neath Railway Company) to exercise the Powers of "The Vale of Neath Railway Act, 1863," (Note: Vale of Neath Railway Act 1863 (26 & 27 Vict. c. cxx)) for constructing the Merthyr Curve; and to raise further Monies; and for other Purposes.
Wallingford and Watlington Railway Act 1864	27 & 28 Vict. c. cclxvi	25 July 1864
An Act for making a Railway from the Great Western Railway to Watlington in the County of Oxford.
New Brighton Pier Act 1864 (repealed)	27 & 28 Vict. c. cclxvii	25 July 1864
An Act for constructing a Pier at New Brighton in the County of Chester. (Repealed by Wallasey Corporation Act 1967 (c. xii))
London (City) Tithes Act 1864 (repealed)	27 & 28 Vict. c. cclxviii	25 July 1864
An Act for the Commutation of Titles in certain Parishes in the City of London; and for other Purposes. (Repealed by City of London (Various Powers) Act 1950 (14 Geo. 6. c. v))
Redruth and Falmouth Junction Railway Act 1864	27 & 28 Vict. c. cclxix	25 July 1864
An Act for making a Railway from the Cornwall Railway to Redruth in the County of Cornwall; and for other Purposes.
Lancashire and Yorkshire Railway (Blackburn, Chorley, Horwich and Wigan Lines) Act 1864	27 & 28 Vict. c. cclxx	25 July 1864
An Act to enable the Lancashire and Yorkshire Railway Company to construct Railways between Blackburn, Chorley, Horwich, and Wigan.
Caledonian Railway (Glasgow Harbour) Act 1864	27 & 28 Vict. c. cclxxi	25 July 1864
An Act for sanctioning an Agreement between the Caledonian and Edinburgh and Glasgow Railway Companies with respect to the Construction of Branch Railways to connect their Undertakings with Glasgow Harbour; and for authorizing the Formation of a Joint Station there; and for other Purposes.
Ilfracombe Railway Act 1864	27 & 28 Vict. c. cclxxii	25 July 1864
An Act for the Incorporation of "The Ilfracombe Railway Company," and the making and maintaining of "The Ilfracombe Railway;" and for other Purposes.
Lancashire Union Railways Act 1864	27 & 28 Vict. c. cclxxiii	25 July 1864
An Act for the Construction of Railways in the County of Lancaster, to be called "The Lancashire Union Railways;" and for other Purposes.
London, Brighton and South Coast Railway (Battersea Lines) Act 1864	27 & 28 Vict. c. cclxxiv	25 July 1864
An Act to authorize the London, Brighton, and South Coast Railway Company to make certain Lines of Railway and other Works in and near the Parish of Battersea in the County of Surrey; and for other Purposes.
Rhymney Railway (Northern Lines) Act 1864	27 & 28 Vict. c. cclxxv	25 July 1864
An Act for authorizing the Rhymney Railway Company to make and maintain Lines of Railway to join the Brecon and Merthyr Tydfil Junction Railway and the Merthyr, Tredegar, and Abergavenny Railway respectively; and for other Purposes.
Rickmansworth, Amersham and Chesham Railway (Level Crossing at Rickmansworth) Act 1864 (repealed)	27 & 28 Vict. c. cclxxvi	25 July 1864
An Act to authorize the Rickmansworth, Amersham, and Chesham Railway Company to make and maintain a level Crossing on their Railway at Rickmansworth; and for other Purposes. (Repealed by Statute Law (Repeals) Act 2013 (c. 2))
Stockport District Waterworks Act 1864 (repealed)	27 & 28 Vict. c. cclxxvii	25 July 1864
An Act for extending the Limits within which the Stockport District Waterworks Company may supply Water, and for authorizing them to raise further Monies; and for other Purposes. (Repealed by Stockport and District Water Board Order 1962 (SI 1962/467))
West Sussex Junction Railway Act 1864 (repealed)	27 & 28 Vict. c. cclxxviii	25 July 1864
An Act for making a Railway from the Mid-Sussex Railway in the Parish of Hardham to the Shoreham, Steyning, and Henfield Railway near the Town of Steyning; and for other Purposes. (Repealed by Statute Law (Repeals) Act 2013 (c. 2))
Edinburgh and Glasgow Railway (Extensions) Act 1864	27 & 28 Vict. c. cclxxix	25 July 1864
An Act to empower the Edinburgh and Glasgow Railway Company to make Railways at Cowlairs, and between Maryhill and the River Clyde; to authorize the Construction of a Tramway at the Harbour of Glasgow; and for other Purposes.
Herne Bay Fishery Act 1864	27 & 28 Vict. c. cclxxx	25 July 1864
An Act for the Incorporation of the Herne Bay, Hampton, and Reculver Oyster Fishery Company; and for authorizing them to establish and maintain an Oyster Fishery in the Estuary of the River Thames, and to make and maintain a Pier and a Tramway and other Works; and for other Purposes.
Dublin, Rathmines, Rathfarnham and Rathcoole Railway Act 1864	27 & 28 Vict. c. cclxxxi	29 July 1864
An Act to authorize the Construction of Railways from Dublin to Rathmines, Rathgar, Roundtown, Rathfarnham, and Rathcoole, and for other Purposes with relation to the said Railways.
Great Eastern Railway Junctions Act 1864	27 & 28 Vict. c. cclxxxii	29 July 1864
An Act to authorize the Great Eastern Railway Company to make several short Junction Railways for connecting different Railways in their System at various Points; and for other Purposes.
Alford and Mablethorpe Railway Act 1864	27 & 28 Vict. c. cclxxxiii	29 July 1864
An Act to authorize the Construction of a Railway from Alford to Mablethorpe in the County of Lincoln; and for other Purposes.
Drayton Junction Railway Act 1864	27 & 28 Vict. c. cclxxxiv	29 July 1864
An Act for making Railways in the Counties of Salop and Stafford, to be called "The Drayton Junction Railway;" and for other Purposes.
East Gloucestershire Railway Act 1864	27 & 28 Vict. c. cclxxxv	29 July 1864
An Act to authorize the Construction of Railways from Cheltenham to Witney in Oxfordshire, and to Faringdon in Berkshire, to be called "The East Gloucestershire Railway."
City of Glasgow Union Railway Act 1864	27 & 28 Vict. c. cclxxxvi	29 July 1864
An Act for making and maintaining the City of Glasgow Union Railway; and for other Purposes.
Kingsbridge Railway Act 1864	27 & 28 Vict. c. cclxxxvii	29 July 1864
An Act for incorporating a Company, and for making and maintaining the Kingsbridge Railway; and for other Purposes.
Lancaster Canal Transfer Act 1864	27 & 28 Vict. c. cclxxxviii	29 July 1864
An Act for authorizing a Lease of a Portion of the Undertaking of the Company of Proprietors of the Lancaster Canal Navigation to the Company of Proprietors of the Canal Navigation from Leeds to Liverpool, and of the Remainder thereof to the London and North-western Railway Company; and for other Purposes.
Launceston, Bodmin, and Wadebridge Junction Railway Act 1864 (repealed)	27 & 28 Vict. c. cclxxxix	29 July 1864
An Act for incorporating the Launceston, Bodmin, and Wadebridge Junction Railway Company, and authorizing them to make and maintain the Launceston, Bodmin, and Wadebridge Junction Railway; and for authorizing Arrangements between that Company and the Okehampton Railway Company; and for other Purposes. (Repealed by Statute Law (Repeals) Act 2013 (c. 2))
Liverpool Central Station Railway Act 1864	27 & 28 Vict. c. ccxc	29 July 1864
An Act to authorize the Construction of a Railway in the Borough of Liverpool, to be called "The Liverpool Central Station Railway;" and for other Purposes.
Metropolitan Railway (Notting Hill and Brompton Extension) Act 1864	27 & 28 Vict. c. ccxci	29 July 1864
An Act to enable the Metropolitan Railway Company to extend their Railway to Notting Hill, Kensington, and Brompton.
Scottish Central Railway (Stations, &c.) Act 1864	27 & 28 Vict. c. ccxcii	29 July 1864
An Act for enabling the Scottish Central Railway Company to extend their Stations at Perth and Dundee, and to execute certain other Works in the Counties of Perth, Forfar, and Stirling; and for other Purposes.
Swansea Vale and Neath and Brecon Junction Railway Act 1864	27 & 28 Vict. c. ccxciii	29 July 1864
An Act to authorize the Construction of a Railway to connect the Swansea Vale and Neath and Brecon Railways.
Tamar, Kit Hill and Callington Railway Act 1864	27 & 28 Vict. c. ccxciv	29 July 1864
An Act for making a Railway from the River Tamar in the Parish of Calstock to Callington in the County of Cornwall; and for other Purposes.
Worcester, Dean Forest and Monmouth Railway (Extension to Gloucester) Act 1864 (repealed)	27 & 28 Vict. c. ccxcv	29 July 1864
An Act to enable the Worcester, Dean Forest, and Monmouth Railway Company to extend their Railway to the Great Western Railway near Gloucester; and for other Purposes. (Repealed by Statute Law (Repeals) Act 2013 (c. 2))
Saint Helen's Canal and Railway Transfer Act 1864 or the St. Helens Canal and Railway Transfer Act 1864	27 & 28 Vict. c. ccxcvi	29 July 1864
An Act for vesting the Undertaking of the Saint Helen's Canal and Railway Company in the London and North-western Railway Company.
South Wales Mineral Railway Act 1864	27 & 28 Vict. c. ccxcvii	29 July 1864
An Act to enable the South Wales Mineral Railway Company to extend their Undertaking.
Mid Hants Act 1864 or the Mid Hants Railway Act 1864	27 & 28 Vict. c. ccxcviii	29 July 1864
An Act for changing the Name of the Alton, Alresford, and Winchester Railway Company, and for authorizing them to make and maintain Railways (the Mid-Hants Lines) in extension of their authorized Railways (the Alton Lines), and to raise Monies for the Purpose, and to make Arrangements with other Companies; and for other Purposes.
Great Northern and Western (of Ireland) Railway (Running Powers, &c.) Act 1864	27 & 28 Vict. c. ccxcix	29 July 1864
An Act to enable the Great Northern and Western (of Ireland) Railway Company to use a Portion of the Midland Great Western Railway (of Ireland) near Athlone, and to issue a Portion of their Share Capital as Preference Shares; and for other Purposes.
Kilkenny Junction Railway Act 1864	27 & 28 Vict. c. ccc	29 July 1864
An Act to extend the Time for the Purchase of Lands for and Completion of the Kilpurcell Branch Railway of the Kilkenny Junction Railway Company, and to confer upon that Company Power to use Stations at Kilkenny, and to enable them to raise further Money; and for other Purposes.
Parsonstown and Portumna Bridge Railway Extension Act 1864	27 & 28 Vict. c. ccci	29 July 1864
An Act to authorize the Construction of a Railway from the Parsonstown and Portumna Bridge Railway to the Town of Portumna.
Wenlock Railway Companies Act 1864	27 & 28 Vict. c. cccii	29 July 1864
An Act for authorizing certain Arrangements between the Much Wenlock and Severn Junction Railway Company and Wenlock Railway Company and the Great Western Railway Company; and for extending the Time for the compulsory Purchase of Property required for the Wenlock Railway; and for other Purposes.
Metropolitan and St. John's Wood Railway Act 1864	27 & 28 Vict. c. ccciii	29 July 1864
An Act to authorize the Construction of a Railway from the Metropolitan Railway through Saint John's Wood to the Hampstead Junction Railway.
Brecon and Merthyr Railway (New Lines) Act 1864	27 & 28 Vict. c. ccciv	29 July 1864
An Act to enable the Brecon and Merthyr Tydfil Junction Railway Company to construct new Lines between their authorized Lines and the Rhymney Railway, and to connect the Rumney and Rhymney Railways, and between the Rumney Railway and Caerphilly and Llantwit-fardre, and to join the Great Western Railway; and to raise further Monies; and for other Purposes.
Dublin Improvements Acts Amendment Act 1864	27 & 28 Vict. c. cccv	29 July 1864
An Act to amend "The Dublin Improvement Act, 1849," (Note: Dublin Improvement Act 1849 (12 & 13 Vict. c. 97)) and "The Dublin Improvement Act Amendment Act, 1861," (Note: Dublin Improvement Act Amendment Act 1861 (24 & 25 Vict. c. 26)) and to confer additional Powers upon the Corporation of Dublin.
Great Western Railway Act 1864	27 & 28 Vict. c. cccvi	29 July 1864
An Act for conferring further Powers on the Great Western Railway Company for the Construction of Works and the Acquisition of Lands, and otherwise in relation to their own Undertaking and the Undertakings of other Companies and Persons; and for other Purposes.
Devon and Somerset Railway Act 1864	27 & 28 Vict. c. cccvii	29 July 1864
An Act for making a Railway from the Bristol and Exeter Railway to Barnstaple; and for other Purposes.
North Staffordshire Railway (New Works) Act 1864	27 & 28 Vict. c. cccviii	29 July 1864
An Act to authorize the Construction of several Railways and a Canal chiefly in the Parishes of Wolstanton and Audley by the North Staffordshire Railway Company, and to confer other Powers upon such Company and various other Companies and the Duke of Bridgewater's Trustees.
North Staffordshire Railway Branches Act 1864	27 & 28 Vict. c. cccix	29 July 1864
An Act to authorize the Construction of Railways from the Silverdale and Newcastle Railway at Wolstanton to the Old Manor House at Madeley, and thence to the Nantwich and Market Drayton and London and North-western Railways; and for other Purposes.
Petersfield and Bishop's Waltham Railway Act 1864 (repealed)	27 & 28 Vict. c. cccx	29 July 1864
An Act for making a Railway from Petersfield to Bishop's Waltham; and for other Purposes. (Repealed by Statute Law (Repeals) Act 2013 (c. 2))
South-eastern Railway (Mid-Kent) Act 1864	27 & 28 Vict. c. cccxi	29 July 1864
An Act for the Amalgamation of the Mid-Kent Railway Company, and their Undertaking, Railway, and Property, with the South-eastern Railway Company, and their Undertaking, Railway, and Property; and for other Purposes.
Cannock Chase and Wolverhampton Railway Act 1864	27 & 28 Vict. c. cccxii	29 July 1864
An Act to authorize the Construction of Railways between Cannock Chase and Wolverhampton in the County of Stafford; and for other Purposes.
Great Eastern Railway (Metropolitan Station and Railways) Act 1864	27 & 28 Vict. c. cccxiii	29 July 1864
An Act to authorize the Great Eastern Railway Company to make several Railways in and near the Metropolis in connexion with their existing Railway, and to purchase Lands for a Station in the City of London.
London, Brighton and South Coast Railway (Additional Powers) Act 1864	27 & 28 Vict. c. cccxiv	29 July 1864
An Act to enable the London, Brighton, and South Coast Railway Company to make new Lines of Railway in the Counties of Surrey and Sussex; to acquire additional Lands; and to acquire the Undertakings of certain other Companies; and for other Purposes.
Metropolitan Railway (Tower Hill Extension) Act 1864	27 & 28 Vict. c. cccxv	29 July 1864
An Act to enable the Metropolitan Railway Company to extend their Railway from Finsbury Circus to Trinity Square, Tower Hill; and for other Purposes.
Neath and Brecon Railway Act 1864	27 & 28 Vict. c. cccxvi	29 July 1864
An Act to enable the Neath and Brecon Railway Company to extend their Railway to the Central Wales Extension Railway and to construct a Branch to the Banwen and Maesmarchog Collieries; and for other Purposes.
Portpatrick Railway (No. 1) Act 1864	27 & 28 Vict. c. cccxvii	29 July 1864
An Act to enable the Portpatrick Railway Company to alter certain of their Works; to increase their Capital; to make working Arrangements with certain Companies; and to use Portions of other Undertakings.
Portpatrick Railway (Steamboats) Act 1864	27 & 28 Vict. c. cccxviii	29 July 1864
An Act to enable the Portpatrick Railway Company to establish Communication by Steam Vessels between Portpatrick and Donaghadee, and between Stranraer and Belfast and Larne.
Exmouth Docks Act 1864	27 & 28 Vict. c. cccxix	29 July 1864
An Act to authorize the Construction of Docks, and a Branch Railway and other Works, at Exmouth in the County of Devon; and for other Purposes.
Manchester, Sheffield and Lincolnshire Railway (Steamboat) Act 1864	27 & 28 Vict. c. cccxx	29 July 1864
An Act to authorize the Manchester, Sheffield, and Lincolnshire Railway Company to run Steam and other Vessels between Great Grimsby and certain Foreign Ports.
Dublin Trunk Connecting Railway Act 1864	27 & 28 Vict. c. cccxxi	29 July 1864
An Act for making Railways and Tramways in and near the City of Dublin.
Metropolitan District Railways Act 1864 or the Metropolitan District Railway Act 1864	27 & 28 Vict. c. cccxxii	29 July 1864
An Act for authorizing the Completion of an Inner Circle of Railways North of the Thames.
North Western and Charing Cross Railway Act 1864	27 & 28 Vict. c. cccxxiii	29 July 1864
An Act for making Railways from the Hampstead Road to the Charing Cross Railway at Hungerford, with a Branch to the London and North-western Railway; and for making new Streets from Tottenham Court Road to Chandos Street, Strand, and from the Strand to Duke Street; and for other Purposes.
Sheffield Waterworks Act 1864 (repealed)	27 & 28 Vict. c. cccxxiv	29 July 1864
An Act to make Provision for the Assessment of Damages claimed against the Sheffield Waterworks Company in consequence of an Inundation caused by the giving way of the Embankment of One of the Reservoirs of the Company; and to enable the Company to raise further Money, and to increase their Water Rents; and for other Purposes. (Repealed by Sheffield Corporation (Consolidation) Act 1918 (8 & 9 Geo. 5. c. lxi))
Tooting, Merton and Wimbledon Extension Railway Act 1864	27 & 28 Vict. c. cccxxv	29 July 1864
An Act for making and maintaining "The Tooting, Merton, and Wimbledon Extension Railway;" and for other Purposes.
Aldborough Pier and Railway Act 1864	27 & 28 Vict. c. cccxxvi	29 July 1864
An Act to authorize the Construction of a Pier at Aldborough in the County of Suffolk, and of a Railway therefrom to the Great Eastern Railway at Aldborough, with a Branch Railway to Slaughden; and for other Purposes.
Bembridge Railway, Tramway and Pier Act 1864	27 & 28 Vict. c. cccxxvii	29 July 1864
An Act for making a Railway from the authorized Line of Railway from Ryde to Lower Shanklin, near Yar Bridge, to Bembridge Point, with a Pier or Landing Place there, and a Tramway from the said intended Railway to Bembridge Down, all in the Parish of Brading in the Isle of Wight; to authorize Arrangements with the Isle of Wight Railway Company; and for other Purposes.
Holywell Railway Act 1864	27 & 28 Vict. c. cccxxviii	29 July 1864
An Act to authorize the Construction of Railways or Tramways from the Town of Holywell to Greenfield in the County of Flint, and to the Holywell Station of the Chester and Holyhead Railway; and for other Purposes.
Dublin and Baltinglass Junction Railway Act 1864	27 & 28 Vict. c. cccxxix	29 July 1864
An Act for making a Railway from the Great Southern and Western Railway in the Parish of Naas and County of Kildare to the Town of Baltinglass in the County of Wicklow; and for other Purposes.

=== Private acts ===
Short title	Citation	Royal assent
Long title
Simpson's Asylum Act 1864	27 & 28 Vict. c. 1 Pr.	23 June 1864
An Act to incorporate the Trustees under the Trust Disposition and Settlement of Francis Simpson Esquire, of Plean, and to explain the said Trust Disposition and Settlement.
Scots Episcopal Fund Act 1864	27 & 28 Vict. c. 2 Pr.	14 July 1864
An Act to incorporate the Trustees of the Scots Episcopal Fund; to alter and amend the Trust Deeds; to empower the Trustees to sell the Estate of Kildonan in the County of Ayr; to regulate the Investment of the Trust Funds; and for other Purposes relating thereto.
Kilkenny Cathedral Economy Fund Act 1864	27 & 28 Vict. c. 3 Pr.	14 July 1864
An Act for authorizing the Dean and Chapter of Kilkenny to raise Money for the Repair and Restoration of Kilkenny Cathedral, and to endow the Parishes of Durrow and Ballinamara; and for other Purposes.
Egmont Estates Act 1864	27 & 28 Vict. c. 4 Pr.	25 July 1864
An Act for giving Effect to a Compromise of Suits affecting the Estates in the County of Cork in Ireland, late of Henry Frederick John James Perceval Fifth Earl of Egmont deceased.
Viscount Guillamore's Estates Act 1864	27 & 28 Vict. c. 5 Pr.	25 July 1864
An Act for giving Effect to a Compromise of a certain Suit depending in the Court of Chancery in Ireland relating to certain Estates in the Counties of Limerick and Cork of the Right Honourable Standish O'Grady First Viscount Guillamore.
Lord Harris' Estate Act 1864	27 & 28 Vict. c. 6 Pr.	25 July 1864
An Act to raise Money for the Purchase of the Horsham Estate in the County of Kent, now in Lease from the Warden and College of All Souls, Oxford, to the Right Honourable George Francis Robert Lord Harris, and of Lands inter-mixed therewith.
Ellames' Estate Act 1864	27 & 28 Vict. c. 7 Pr.	25 July 1864
An Act to enable the Trustees of the Will of Pattison Ellames, late of Allerton Hall in the County of Lancaster, Esquire, deceased, to sell the said Mansion House, Lands, and Hereditaments of Allerton Hall, and to purchase other Lands and Hereditaments in lieu thereof.
Charles Sheils' Almshouses Charity Act 1864	27 & 28 Vict. c. 8 Pr.	25 July 1864
An Act for Charles Sheils' Almshouses Charity.
Earl of Abergavenny's Estates Act 1864	27 & 28 Vict. c. 9 Pr.	29 July 1864
An Act for the Purpose of conferring Powers of jointuring and charging Portions out of and upon the Estates and Hereditaments of which the Right Honourable William Earl of Abergavenny is seised as Tenant in Tail Male under an Act passed in the Second and Third Years of the Reign of King Philip and Queen Mary, (Note: Restitution of Sir Edward Nevill's Heirs Act 1555 (2 & 3 Ph. & M. c. 2 Pr.)) and for enabling Leases and Sales to be made of certain Parts of the same Estates and Hereditaments; and for other Purposes.
Lilford Estate Act 1864	27 & 28 Vict. c. 10 Pr.	29 July 1864
An Act for amending, extending, and enlarging the Powers contained in the Will and Codicil of the Right Honourable Thomas Atherton Lord Lilford deceased.
Hailes Estate Act 1864	27 & 28 Vict. c. 11 Pr.	29 July 1864
An Act to provide for the Settlement of the Claims of the Heirs of Entail of the Estate of Hailes in the County of Edinburgh with respect to the Construction of the Edinburgh and Glasgow Union Canal through the said Estate.
O'Reilly Estate Act 1864	27 & 28 Vict. c. 12 Pr.	29 July 1864
An Act to confirm and give Effect to a Decree of the Right Honourable the Lord High Chancellor of Ireland made in a certain Cause Petition Matter wherein Anthony O'Reilly was Petitioner and Caroline Maria O'Reilly and others were Respondents, and bearing Date the Second Day of May One thousand eight hundred and sixty-one, and to Two Indentures dated respectively the Twenty-fifth Day of May One thousand eight hundred and sixty-one executed in pursuance of the said Decree, and to an Indenture dated Fifteenth Day of April One thousand eight hundred and sixty-one therein and herein particularly mentioned.
Arden's Estate Act 1864	27 & 28 Vict. c. 13 Pr.	29 July 1864
An Act for authorizing the Trustees of the Will of John Arden Esquire, deceased, to build a Family Mansion on Part of the Estates, subject to the Limitations of the said Will; and for other Purposes.
Dundee Churches and Hospital Act 1864	27 & 28 Vict. c. 14 Pr.	29 July 1864
An Act to confirm Agreements between the Magistrates and Town Council of the Royal Burgh of Dundee and the Presbytery and Ministers of Dundee with respect to the Churches and Hospital of the said Burgh; and for other Purposes.
Chittenden's Disabilities Removal Act 1864 (Note: This act was not printed by the Queen's Printer.)	27 & 28 Vict. c. 15 Pr.	25 July 1864
An Act to enable John Chittenden, Clerk, to exercise his Office of a Priest and to hold any Benefice or Preferment in the United Church of England and Ireland.

=== Sources ===
- Rickards, George Kettilby, ed. (1864). The Statutes of the United Kingdom of Great Britain and Ireland, 27 & 28 Victoria, 1864. London: Eyre and Spottiswoode – via Google Books.

== See also ==
- List of acts of the Parliament of the United Kingdom
