= Reading Power Station (UK) =

Former power station in England

Reading power station
- Country: England
- Location: Reading
- Coordinates: 51°27′42″N 00°58′18″W
- Status: Decommissioned and demolished
- Commission date: 1895
- Decommission date: 1960s
- Owners: Reading Electric Supply Company Limited (1893–1930s); Reading Corporation (1930s–1948); British Electricity Authority (1948–1955); Central Electricity Authority (1955–1957); Central Electricity Generating Board (1958–1970)
- Operator: As owner

Thermal power station
- Primary fuel: Coal
- Turbine technology: Steam turbines
- Cooling towers: none
- Cooling source: river water

Power generation
- Units operational: 2 x 1.5 MW, 2 x 3.75 MW (1955)
- Units decommissioned: all
- Nameplate capacity: 10.7 MW
- Annual net output: 7,510 MWh (1946)

Reading power station, Berkshire, England supplied electricity to the town of Reading and the surrounding area from 1895 to the 1960s. It was initially owned and operated by the Reading Electric Supply Company Limited, then from 1933 by the Reading Corporation until the nationalisation of the British electricity supply industry in 1948. The power station was redeveloped several times with new equipment replacing retired plant. The station was decommissioned in the late 1960s.

== History ==
Electric Lighting Order Confirmation (No. 5) Act 1893
- Act of Parliament
- Parliament of the United Kingdom
- Long title: An Act to confirm a Provisional Order made by the Board of Trade under the Electric Lighting Acts, 1882 and 1888, relating to Reading.
- Citation: 56 & 57 Vict. c. cxli

Dates
- Royal assent: 27 July 1893

Text of statute as originally enacted

In 1893 the Reading Electric Supply Company Limited applied for a provisional order under the Electric Lighting Acts to generate and supply electricity to the town. The Reading Electric Supply Order 1893 was granted by the Board of Trade and was confirmed by Parliament through the Electric Lighting Order Confirmation (No. 5) Act 1893 (56 & 57 Vict. c. cxli). The company built a power station in Vastern Road Reading (51°27′42″N 0°58′18″W) and supplied electricity from November 1895. The riverside location facilitated the supply of coal by barge, and provided cooling water for the power station.

Reading and District Electric Supply Act 1910
- Act of Parliament
- Parliament of the United Kingdom
- Long title: An Act to extend the area of supply of the Reading Electric Supply Company Limited to confer further powers upon that Company in relation to their undertaking and for other purposes.
- Citation: 10 Edw. 7 & 1 Geo. 5. c. xxix

Dates
- Royal assent: 26 July 1910

In 1910 the Reading Electric Supply Company obtained the Reading and District Electric Supply Act 1910 (10 Edw. 7 & 1 Geo. 5. c. xxix) which permitted it to extend its area of supply. In 1914 the company further extended its supply area through the means of the Reading Electric (York Town Bulk Supply) Electric Lighting Order 1914 confirmed by the Electric Lighting Orders Confirmation (No. 7) Act 1914 (4 & 5 Geo. 5. c. cxx). The supply area included Reading, Caversham, Mapledurham, Tilehurst and Theale; it provided electricity in bulk to York Town, Blackwater, Henley, Shiplake, Twyford and Sonning.

== Reading Electric Supply Company Limited ==
The Reading Electric Supply Company Limited was registered on 22 January 1892. It generated and supplied electricity to the town of Reading and the surrounding area through the construction of a generating station at Reading and an electricity distribution network of high voltage cables. In 1921 the company operated 30 miles of feeder mains, 71 miles of distribution and service mains, with 1,890 kW of transformer and substation equipment.

In 1921 the company chairman was William May; the managing director was G. W. Spenser Hawkes; the other directors were Sir Phillip Dawson, Charles Ernest Hewett, John May and William Pole Routh. By 1926 John E Broadbent had replaced C. E. Hewett. The company's registered office was 3–5 Market Place Reading.

The company raised capital through the issue of shares. For example, in 1921 it issued share capital of £152,000 in £1 shares and £100,000 7 ½ percent first mortgage debenture stock; in 1926 it issued £152,125 in £1 shares and £150,000 6 percent debenture stock. The revenue and profits of the company are outlined below.

In 1933 Reading Corporation acquired the electricity undertaking of the Reading Electric Supply Company Limited for £443,000. The company was subsequently wound up.

== Equipment specification ==
The original plant at Reading power station comprised horizontal compound condensing engines coupled directly to flywheel alternators. In 1898 the generating capacity was 375 kW and the maximum electricity load was 216 kW.

=== Plant in the 1920s ===
New plant was installed to meet growing demand for electricity. By 1923 the generating plant comprised:

- Coal-fired boilers generating up to 69,000 lb/h (8.7 kg/s) of steam, these supplied steam to:
- Generators
  - 1 × 350 kW reciprocating engine driving a direct current (DC) generator
  - 1 × 500 kW reciprocating engine driving a DC generator
  - 1 × 250 kW reciprocating engine driving an alternator
  - 2 × 1,500 kW steam turbo-alternator

These machines gave a total generating capacity of 3,250 kW of alternating current and 850 kW DC.

A variety of electricity supplies were available to consumers:

- 3-phase, 50 Hz AC at 345 and 200 Volts.
- DC 400 & 200 Volts

=== Plant in 1955 ===
New plant was commissioned as older plant was retired from service. By the 1950s Reading power station comprised:

- Boilers:
  - 4 × Babcock & Wilcox 15,000 lb/h (1.9 kg/s), steam conditions 175 psi and 500 °F (12.1 bar, 260 °C)
  - 1 × Babcock & Wilcox 20,000 lb/h (2.52 kg/s), steam conditions 200 psi and 550 °F (13.8 bar, 288 °C)
  - 2 × Babcock & Wilcox 40,000 lb/h (5.04 kg/s), steam conditions 200 psi and 650 °F (13.8 bar, 343 °C)

The boilers had a total evaporative capacity of 160,000 lb/h (20.2 kg/s), and supplied steam to:

- Turbo-alternators:
  - 2 × Belliss & Morcon–English Electric 1.5 MW turbo-alternators, generating at 3.5 kV
  - 1 × Brush-Ljungstrom 3.75 MW, turbo-alternator, generating at 3.5 kV.
  - 1 × English Electric 3.75 MW, turbo-alternator, generating at 3.5 kV

There was also 1 × 200 kW Diesel engine set

The completed total installed generating capacity was 10.7 MW, with an output capacity of 10 MW.

Condenser cooling water was drawn from the River Thames.

== Operations ==
Electricity operational data for the early years was as follows:

Reading operational data 1894–97
| Year | Consumers | Lamps |
|---|---|---|
| 1894 | 38 | 2,150 |
| 1895 | 83 | 4,300 |
| 1896 | 154 | 8,700 |
| 1897 | 201 | 12,299 |

The data demonstrates the rapid growth of electricity consumption during this period.

In 1898 maximum electricity demand was 216 kW.

=== Operating data 1918–25 ===
The electricity sold and revenue from 1918 to 1920 was as follows:

Operational data 1918–20
| Year | Connections kW | Electricity sold MWh | Revenue | Net profit |
|---|---|---|---|---|
| 1918 | 6,149 | 3,486 | £34,659 | £13,284 |
| 1919 | 6,765 | 3,130 | £37,905 | £12,114 |
| 1920 | 7,002 | 3,566 | £51,004 | £14,365 |

The operating data for the period 1921–23 is shown in the table:

Reading power station operating data 1921–23
| Electricity Use | Units | Year | | |
| Electricity Use | Units | 1921 | 1922 | 1923 |
|---|---|---|---|---|
| Lighting and domestic use | MWh | 1,048 | 1,030 | 1,177 |
| Public lighting use | MWh | 59 | 61 | 69 |
| Traction | MWh | – | – | – |
| Power use | MWh | 2,459 | 2,191 | 2,248 |
| Total use | MWh | 3,566 | 3,282 | 3,494 |
Load and connected load
| Maximum load | kW | 2,628 | 2,703 | 2,931 |
| Total connections | kW | 7,602 | 7,923 | 8,482 |
| Load factor | Per cent | 20.2 | 17.9 | 17.9 |
Financial
| Revenue from sales of current | £ | – | 52,472 | 58,727 |
| Surplus of revenue over expenses | £ | – | 15,304 | 23,806 |

The number of customers, the electricity sold and the profit from 1922 to 1925 was:

Operational data 1922–25
| Year | Customers | Connections kW | Load kW | Electricity sold MWh | Total revenue | Net profit |
|---|---|---|---|---|---|---|
| 1922 | 2,005 | 8,160 | 2,939 | 3,493 | £55,962 | £23,988 |
| 1923 | 2,164 | 8,730 | 3,250 | 1,089 | £60,636 | £25,766 |
| 1924 | 2,398 | 9,200 | 3,570 | 6,452 | £67,544 | £32,476 |
| 1925 | 2,688 | 10,430 | 4,270 | 6,601 | £78,000 | £38,000 |

Under the terms of the Electricity (Supply) Act 1926 (16 & 17 Geo. 5. c. 51) the Central Electricity Board (CEB) was established in 1926. The CEB identified high efficiency ‘selected’ power stations that would supply electricity most effectively. The CEB also constructed the National Grid (1927–33) to connect power stations within a region.

=== Operating data 1946 ===
Reading power station operating data in 1946 is given below:

Reading power station operating data in 1946
| Year | Load factor per cent | Max output load MW | Electricity supplied MWh | Thermal efficiency per cent |
|---|---|---|---|---|
| 1946 | – | 10,645 | 7,510 | – |

The British electricity supply industry was nationalised in 1948 under the provisions of the Electricity Act 1947 (10 & 11 Geo. 6. c. 54). The Reading electricity undertaking was abolished, ownership of Reading power station was vested in the British Electricity Authority, and subsequently the Central Electricity Authority and the Central Electricity Generating Board (CEGB). At the same time the electricity distribution and sales responsibilities of the Reading electricity undertaking were transferred to the Southern Electricity Board (SEB).

=== Operating data 1954–67 ===
Operating data for the period 1954–67 is shown in the table:

Reading power station operating data, 1954–67
| Year | Running hours or load factor (per cent) | Max output capacity MW | Electricity supplied GWh | Thermal efficiency per cent |
|---|---|---|---|---|
| 1954 | 1987 | 11 | 11.417 | 10.82 |
| 1955 | 1548 | 11 | 7.172 | 9.59 |
| 1956 | 1401 | 10 | 7.862 | 10.41 |
| 1957 | 840 | 10 | 4.445 | 8.79 |
| 1958 | 322 | 10 | 1.621 | 8.98 |
| 1961 | (1.0 %) | 10 | 0.867 | 7.30 |
| 1962 | (1.2 %) | 10 | 1.066 | 9.85 |
| 1963 | (3.96 %) | 10 | 3.470 | 12.11 |
| 1967 | (5.6 %) | 10 | 4.902 | 11.95 |

The data shows the declining use of Reading power station.

== Closure ==
Reading power station was decommissioned in the 1960s. The buildings were subsequently demolished and the area has been redeveloped with commercial units.

== See also ==
- Timeline of the UK electricity supply industry
- List of power stations in England
