= List of acts of the Parliament of the United Kingdom from 1893 =

This is a complete list of acts of the Parliament of the United Kingdom for the year 1893.

Note that the first parliament of the United Kingdom was held in 1801; parliaments between 1707 and 1800 were either parliaments of Great Britain or of Ireland). For acts passed up until 1707, see the list of acts of the Parliament of England and the list of acts of the Parliament of Scotland. For acts passed from 1707 to 1800, see the list of acts of the Parliament of Great Britain. See also the list of acts of the Parliament of Ireland.

For acts of the devolved parliaments and assemblies in the United Kingdom, see the list of acts of the Scottish Parliament, the list of acts of the Northern Ireland Assembly, and the list of acts and measures of Senedd Cymru; see also the list of acts of the Parliament of Northern Ireland.

The number shown after each act's title is its chapter number. Acts passed before 1963 are cited using this number, preceded by the year(s) of the reign during which the relevant parliamentary session was held; thus the Union with Ireland Act 1800 is cited as "39 & 40 Geo. 3 c. 67", meaning the 67th act passed during the session that started in the 39th year of the reign of George III and which finished in the 40th year of that reign. Note that the modern convention is to use Arabic numerals in citations (thus "41 Geo. 3" rather than "41 Geo. III"). Acts of the last session of the Parliament of Great Britain and the first session of the Parliament of the United Kingdom are both cited as "41 Geo. 3". Acts passed from 1963 onwards are simply cited by calendar year and chapter number.

All modern acts have a short title, e.g. the Local Government Act 2003. Some earlier acts also have a short title given to them by later acts, such as by the Short Titles Act 1896.

== 56 & 57 Vict. ==
The second session of the 25th Parliament of the United Kingdom, which met from 31 January 1893 until 5 March 1894.

No acts were passed during the short first session in 1892.

=== Public general acts ===
Short title	Citation	Royal assent
Long title
Coinage Act 1893 (repealed)	56 & 57 Vict. c. 1	28 March 1893
An Act to make further Provision for the Expenses of the Coinage Act, 1891. (Note: Coinage Act 1891 (54 & 55 Vict. c. 72)) (Repealed by Statute Law Revision Act 1963 (c. 30))
Trade Union (Provident Funds) Act 1893 (repealed)	56 & 57 Vict. c. 2	28 March 1893
An Act to exempt from Income Tax the Invested Funds of Trade Unions applied in payment of Provident Benefits. (Repealed by Income Tax Act 1918 (8 & 9 Geo. 5. c. 40))
Consolidated Fund (No. 1) Act 1893 (repealed)	56 & 57 Vict. c. 3	28 March 1893
An Act to apply certain sums out of the Consolidated Fund to the service of the years ending on the thirty-first day of March one thousand eight hundred and ninety-one, one thousand eight hundred and ninety-two, one thousand eight hundred and ninety-three, and one thousand eight hundred and ninety-four. (Repealed by Statute Law Revision Act 1908 (8 Edw. 7. c. 49))
Army (Annual) Act 1893 (repealed)	56 & 57 Vict. c. 4	29 April 1893
An Act to provide, during twelve months, for the Discipline and Regulation of the Army. (Repealed by Statute Law Revision Act 1908 (8 Edw. 7. c. 49) and Revision of the Army and Air Force Acts (Transitional Provisions) Act 1955 (3 & 4 Eliz. 2. c. 20))
Regimental Debts Act 1893 renamed to Debts (Deceased Servicemen etc) Act 1893	56 & 57 Vict. c. 5	29 April 1893
An Act to consolidate and amend the Law relating to the Payment of Regimental Debts, and the Collection and Disposal of the Effects of Officers and Soldiers in case of Death, Desertion, Insanity, and other cases.
Police Disabilities Removal Act 1893 (repealed)	56 & 57 Vict. c. 6	12 May 1893
An Act to remove Disabilities of Policemen with regard to their Vote in Municipal, School Board, and other Elections. (Repealed by Representation of the People Act 1948 (11 & 12 Geo. 6. c. 65))
Customs and Inland Revenue Act 1893 (repealed)	56 & 57 Vict. c. 7	12 May 1893
An Act to grant certain Duties of Customs and Inland Revenue, to repeal and alter other Duties, and to amend the Law relating to Inland Revenue. (Repealed by Statute Law (Repeals) Act 2004 (c. 14))
Local Authorities Loans (Scotland) Act 1891 Amendment Act 1893 (repealed)	56 & 57 Vict. c. 8	12 May 1893
An Act to amend the Local Authorities Loans (Scotland) Act, 1891. (Note: Local Authorities Loans (Scotland) Act 1891 (54 & 55 Vict. c. 34)) (Repealed by Local Government (Scotland) Act 1947 (10 & 11 Geo. 6. c. 43))
Municipal Corporations Act 1893 (repealed)	56 & 57 Vict. c. 9	9 June 1893
An Act to amend the Municipal Corporations Act, 1882. (Note: Municipal Corporations Act 1882 (45 & 46 Vict. c. 50)) (Repealed for England and Wales by Local Government Act 1933 (23 & 24 Geo. 5. c. 51) (Note: Incorrectly cited as "Local Government Act 1923" in the Chronological Table of the Statutes.) and for Northern Ireland by Local Government Act (Northern Ireland) 1934 (c. 22 (N.I.)))
Police Act 1893 (repealed)	56 & 57 Vict. c. 10	9 June 1893
An Act to amend the Police Acts. (Repealed by Police Pensions Act 1921 (11 & 12 Geo. 5. c. 31), Fire Brigades Act 1938 (1 & 2 Geo. 6. c. 72) and Statute Law Revision Act 1950 (14 Geo. 6. c. 6))
Public Libraries (Amendment) Act 1893 (repealed)	56 & 57 Vict. c. 11	9 June 1893
An Act to amend the Public Libraries Act, 1892. (Note: Public Libraries Act 1892 (55 & 56 Vict. c. 53)) (Repealed by Public Libraries and Museums Act 1964 (c. 75))
Day Industrial Schools (Scotland) Act 1893 (repealed)	56 & 57 Vict. c. 12	9 June 1893
An Act to make provision for the establishment of Day Industrial Schools in Scotland and to amend the Education (Scotland) Acts, 1872 to 1883. (Repealed by Children Act 1908 (8 Edw. 7. c. 67) and Education (Scotland) Act 1945 (8 & 9 Geo. 6. c. 37))
Cholera Hospitals (Ireland) Act 1893 (repealed)	56 & 57 Vict. c. 13	9 June 1893
An Act to enable sanitary authorities in Ireland to take possession of land for the erection of temporary Cholera Hospitals. (Repealed by Statute Law Revision Act 1908 (8 Edw. 7. c. 49))
Statute Law Revision Act 1893	56 & 57 Vict. c. 14	9 June 1893
An Act for further promoting the Revision of the Statute Law by repealing Enactments which have ceased to be in force or have become unnecessary.
Reformatory Schools (Scotland) Act 1893 (repealed)	56 & 57 Vict. c. 15	9 June 1893
An Act to amend the Acts relating to Reformatory Schools in Scotland. (Repealed by Reformatory Schools Act 1893 (56 & 57 Vict. c. 48))
Consolidated Fund (No. 2) Act 1893 (repealed)	56 & 57 Vict. c. 16	9 June 1893
An Act to apply a sum out of the Consolidated Fund to the service of the year ending on the thirty-first day of March one thousand eight hundred and ninety-four. (Repealed by Statute Law Revision Act 1908 (8 Edw. 7. c. 49))
North Sea Fisheries Act 1893 (repealed)	56 & 57 Vict. c. 17	29 June 1893
An Act to carry into effect an International Convention respecting the Liquor Traffic in the North Sea. (Repealed by Marine and Coastal Access Act 2009 (c. 23))
Treasury Chest Fund Act 1893 (repealed)	56 & 57 Vict. c. 18	29 June 1893
An Act to reduce the Limit of the Balance of the Treasury Chest Fund. (Repealed by Finance Act 1958 (6 & 7 Eliz. 2. c. 56))
Weights and Measures Act 1893 (repealed)	56 & 57 Vict. c. 19	29 June 1893
An Act to amend the Law relating to Weights and Measures. (Repealed for England and Wales and Scotland by Weights and Measures Act 1963 (c. 31) and for Northern Ireland by Statute Law Revision (Northern Ireland) Act 1954 (c. 35 (N.I.)))
Duchy of Cornwall Management Act 1893 (repealed)	56 & 57 Vict. c. 20	29 June 1893
An Act to extend the Provisions of the Duchy of Cornwall Management Act, 1863, (Note: Duchy of Cornwall Management Act 1863 (26 & 27 Vict. c. 49)) relating to the Powers of Sale and Enfranchisement, and for other purposes. (Repealed by Trustee Act 2000 (c. 29))
Voluntary Conveyances Act 1893	56 & 57 Vict. c. 21	29 June 1893
An Act to amend the Law relating to the Avoidance of Voluntary Conveyances. (Repealed for England and Wales by Law of Property Act 1925 (15 & 16 Geo. 5. c. 20))
Appeal (Formâ Pauperis) Act 1893 (repealed)	56 & 57 Vict. c. 22	29 June 1893
An Act to amend the Appellate Jurisdiction Act, 1876, (Note: Appellate Jurisdiction Act 1876 (39 & 40 Vict. c. 59)) so far as regards Appeals in Formâ Pauperis. (Repealed by Legal Aid and Advice Act 1949 (12, 13 & 14 Geo. 6. c. 51), Legal Aid and Solicitors (Scotland) Act 1949 (12, 13 & 14 Geo. 6. c. 63) and Statute Law (Repeals) Act 1973 (c. 39))
Seal Fishery (North Pacific) Act 1893 (repealed)	56 & 57 Vict. c. 23	29 June 1893
An Act to provide for prohibiting the Catching of Seals at certain periods in Behring's Sea and other parts of the Pacific Ocean adjacent to Behring's Sea. (Repealed by Seal Fisheries (North Pacific) Act 1895 (58 & 59 Vict. c. 21))
Public Works Loans Act 1893 (repealed)	56 & 57 Vict. c. 24	29 June 1893
An Act to grant Money for the purpose of certain Local Loans. (Repealed by Statute Law Revision Act 1908 (8 Edw. 7. c. 49))
Burgh Police (Scotland) Act 1893 (repealed)	56 & 57 Vict. c. 25	27 July 1893
An Act to amend the Burgh Police (Scotland) Act, 1892. (Note: Burgh Police (Scotland) Act 1892 (55 & 56 Vict. c. 55)) (Repealed by Local Government (Scotland) Act 1947 (10 & 11 Geo. 6. c. 43))
Prison (Officers' Superannuation) Act 1893 (repealed)	56 & 57 Vict. c. 26	27 July 1893
An Act to explain and amend certain Provisions of the Prison Act, 1877, (Note: Prison Act 1877 (40 & 41 Vict. c. 21)) with respect to the Superannuation of Prison Officers. (Repealed by Statute Law Revision Act 1950 (14 Geo. 6. c. 6))
Land Tax Commissioners Names Act 1893 (repealed)	56 & 57 Vict. c. 27	27 July 1893
An Act to appoint additional Commissioners for executing the Acts for granting a Land Tax and other Rates and Taxes. (Repealed by Statute Law Revision Act 1964 (c. 79))
Consolidated Fund (No. 3) Act 1893 (repealed)	56 & 57 Vict. c. 28	27 July 1893
An Act to apply a sum out of the Consolidated Fund to the service of the year ending on the thirty-first day of March one thousand eight hundred and ninety-four. (Repealed by Statute Law Revision Act 1908 (8 Edw. 7. c. 49))
Railway Regulation Act 1893 or the Railway Servants (Hours of Labour) Act 1893 (repealed)	56 & 57 Vict. c. 29	27 July 1893
An Act to amend the Law with respect to the Hours of Labour of Railway Servants. (Repealed by Statute Law Revision Act 1960 (8 & 9 Eliz. 2. c. 56))
Friendly Societies Act 1893 (repealed)	56 & 57 Vict. c. 30	27 July 1893
An Act to amend the Friendly Societies Act, 1875. (Note: Friendly Societies Act 1875 (38 & 39 Vict. c. 60)) (Repealed by Friendly Societies Act 1896 (59 & 60 Vict. c. 25))
Rivers Pollution Prevention Act 1893 (repealed)	56 & 57 Vict. c. 31	27 July 1893
An Act to explain the Rivers Pollution Prevention Act, 1876. (Note: Rivers Pollution Prevention Act 1876 (39 & 40 Vict. c. 75)) (Repealed for England and Wales by Rivers (Prevention of Pollution) Act 1951 (14 & 15 Geo. 6. c. 64), for Scotland by Rivers (Prevention of Pollution) (Scotland) Act 1951 (14 & 15 Geo. 6. c. 66) and for Northern Ireland by Water Act (Northern Ireland) 1972 (c. 5 (N.I.)))
Barbed Wire Act 1893 (repealed)	56 & 57 Vict. c. 32	27 July 1893
An Act to prevent the use of Barbed Wire for Fences in Roads, Streets, Lanes, and other Thoroughfares. (Repealed for England and Wales by Highways Act 1959 (7 & 8 Eliz. 2. c. 25) and London Government Act 1963 (c. 33), for Scotland by Roads (Scotland) Act 1984 (c. 54) and for Northern Ireland by Roads (Northern Ireland) Order 1980 (SI 1980/1085 (N.I. 11)))
Housing of the Working Classes Act 1893 (repealed)	56 & 57 Vict. c. 33	24 August 1893
An Act to remove certain doubts as to the application of Part III. of the Housing of the Working Classes Act, 1890, (Note: Housing of the Working Classes Act 1890 (53 & 54 Vict. c. 70)) to certain authorities in Ireland. (Repealed by Housing Act (Northern Ireland) 1948 (c. 9 (N.I.)))
Improvement of Land (Scotland) Act 1893 (repealed)	56 & 57 Vict. c. 34	24 August 1893
An Act to extend the operation of the Improvement of Land Act, 1864, (Note: Improvement of Land Act 1864 (27 & 28 Vict. c. 114)) so far as regards Scotland. (Repealed by Improvement of Land Act 1899 (62 & 63 Vict. c. 46))
Congested Districts Board (Ireland) Act 1893 (repealed)	56 & 57 Vict. c. 35	24 August 1893
An Act to amend the power of the Congested Districts Board for Ireland so far as respects the Purchase and Holding of Property. (Repealed by Statute Law Revision Act 1908 (8 Edw. 7. c. 49) and Statute Law Revision Act 1950 (14 Geo. 6. c. 6))
Law of Distress and Small Debts (Ireland) Act 1893	56 & 57 Vict. c. 36	24 August 1893
An Act to amend the Law of Distress and Small Debts (Ireland) Act, 1888. (Note: Law of Distress and Small Debts (Ireland) Act 1888 (51 & 52 Vict. c. 47))
Liverpool Court of Passage Act 1893 (repealed)	56 & 57 Vict. c. 37	24 August 1893
An Act to better define the Jurisdiction and to improve the Procedure of the Court of Passage in the City of Liverpool, and for other purposes connected therewith. (Repealed by Liverpool Corporation Act 1921 (11 & 12 Geo. 5. c. lxxiv))
Conveyance of Mails Act 1893 (repealed)	56 & 57 Vict. c. 38	24 August 1893
An Act to make further provision for the Conveyance of Her Majesty's Mails. (Repealed by Post Office Act 1953 (1 & 2 Eliz. 2. c. 36))
Industrial and Provident Societies Act 1893 (repealed)	56 & 57 Vict. c. 39	12 September 1893
An Act to consolidate and amend the Laws relating to Industrial and Provident Societies. (Repealed for England and Wales and Scotland by Industrial and Provident Societies Act 1965 (c. 12) and for Northern Ireland by Industrial and Provident Societies Act (Northern Ireland) 1969 (c. 24 (N.I.)))
Public Works Loans (No. 2) Act 1893 (repealed)	56 & 57 Vict. c. 40	12 September 1893
An Act to make provision for certain purposes relating to Local Loans. (Repealed by Public Works Loans Act 1964 (c. 9))
Irish Education Act 1893 (repealed)	56 & 57 Vict. c. 41	12 September 1893
An Act to amend the Irish Education Act, 1892. (Note: Irish Education Act 1892 (55 & 56 Vict. c. 42)) (Repealed by Education Act (Northern Ireland) 1923 (13 & 14 Geo. 5. c. 21 (N.I.)))
Elementary Education (Blind and Deaf Children) Act 1893 (repealed)	56 & 57 Vict. c. 42	12 September 1893
An Act to make better Provision for the Elementary Education of Blind and Deaf Children in England and Wales. (Repealed by Education Act 1921 (11 & 12 Geo. 5. c. 51))
Contagious Diseases (Animals) Act 1893 (repealed)	56 & 57 Vict. c. 43	12 September 1893
An Act to confer further powers under the Contagious Diseases (Animals) Acts, 1878 to 1892, with respect to Swine Fever. (Repealed by Diseases of Animals Act 1894 (57 & 58 Vict. c. 57))
Sheriff Courts Consignations (Scotland) Act 1893	56 & 57 Vict. c. 44	12 September 1893
An Act to make provision in regard to the Consignation of Money in the Sheriff Courts in Scotland.
Naval Defence Act 1893 (repealed)	56 & 57 Vict. c. 45	12 September 1893
An Act to make further provision for the completion and equipment of Ships under the Naval Defence Act, 1889, (Note: Naval Defence Act 1889 (52 & 53 Vict. c. 8)) and to amend that Aet. (Repealed by Finance Act 1894 (57 & 58 Vict. c. 30))
Consolidated Fund (No. 4) Act 1893 (repealed)	56 & 57 Vict. c. 46	12 September 1893
An Act to apply a sum out of the Consolidated Fund to the service of the year ending on the thirty-first day of March one thousand eight hundred and ninety-four. (Repealed by Statute Law Revision Act 1908 (8 Edw. 7. c. 49))
Public Health (London) Act 1891 Amendment Act 1893 (repealed)	56 & 57 Vict. c. 47	12 September 1893
An Act to amend the Public Health (London) Act, 1891, (Note: Public Health (London) Act 1891 (54 & 55 Vict. c. 76)) with respect to the Removal of Refuse. (Repealed by Public Health (London) Act 1936 (26 Geo. 5 & 1 Edw. 8. c. 50))
Reformatory Schools Act 1893 (repealed)	56 & 57 Vict. c. 48	22 September 1893
An Act to amend the Law relating to Reformatory Schools. (Repealed by Children Act 1908 (8 Edw. 7. c. 67))
County Surveyors (Ireland) Act 1893 (repealed)	56 & 57 Vict. c. 49	22 September 1893
An Act to amend the Law relating to the Appointment of County Surveyors in Ireland. (Repealed by Statute Law Revision Act 1908 (8 Edw. 7. c. 49))
Light Railways (Ireland) Act 1893 (repealed)	56 & 57 Vict. c. 50	22 September 1893
An Act to amend the Provisions as to Payments for Light Railways in Ireland. (Repealed by Statute Law Revision Act 1908 (8 Edw. 7. c. 49) and Public Works, etc., Loans Act (Northern Ireland) 1953 (c. 13 (N.I.)))
Elementary Education (School Attendance) Act 1893 (repealed)	56 & 57 Vict. c. 51	22 September 1893
An Act to amend the Elementary Education Acts with respect to the age for attendance at School. (Repealed by Education Act 1918 (8 & 9 Geo. 5. c. 39))
Burghs Gas Supply (Scotland) Act 1893 (repealed)	56 & 57 Vict. c. 52	22 September 1893
An Act to amend the Burghs Gas Supply (Scotland) Act, 1876. (Note: Burghs Gas Supply (Scotland) Act 1876 (39 & 40 Vict. c. 49)) (Repealed by Gas Act 1948 (11 & 12 Geo. 6. c. 67))
Trustee Act 1893 (repealed)	56 & 57 Vict. c. 53	22 September 1893
An Act to consolidate Enactments relating to Trustees. (Repealed for England and Wales by Trustee Act 1925 (15 & 16 Geo. 5. c. 19) and for Northern Ireland by Trustee Act (Northern Ireland) 1958 (c. 23 (N.I.)))
Statute Law Revision (No. 2) Act 1893 (repealed)	56 & 57 Vict. c. 54	22 September 1893
An Act for further promoting the Revision of the Statute Law by repealing Enactments which have ceased to be in force or have become unnecessary. (Repealed by Statute Law (Repeals) Act 1998 (c. 43))
Metropolis Management (Plumstead and Hackney) Act 1893 (repealed)	56 & 57 Vict. c. 55	22 September 1893
An Act to amend the Metropolis Management Acts. (Repealed by Local Law (Greater London Council and Inner London Boroughs) Order 1965 (SI 1965/540))
Fertilisers and Feeding Stuffs Act 1893 (repealed)	56 & 57 Vict. c. 56	22 September 1893
An Act to amend the Law with respect to the sale of Agricultural Fertilisers and Feeding Stuffs. (Repealed by Fertilisers and Feeding Stuffs Act 1906 (6 Edw. 7. c. 27))
Law of Commons Amendment Act 1893 (repealed)	56 & 57 Vict. c. 57	22 September 1893
An Act to amend the Law relating to Commons. (Repealed by Commons Act 2006 (c. 26))
Companies (Winding-up) Act 1893 (repealed)	56 & 57 Vict. c. 58	22 September 1893
An Act to amend Section Ten of the Companies (Winding-up) Act, 1890. (Note: Companies (Winding-up) Act 1890 (53 & 54 Vict. c. 63)) (Repealed by Companies (Consolidation) Act 1908 (8 Edw. 7. c. 69))
Expiring Laws Continuance Act 1893 (repealed)	56 & 57 Vict. c. 59	22 September 1893
An Act to continue various Expiring Laws. (Repealed by Statute Law Revision Act 1908 (8 Edw. 7. c. 49))
Appropriation Act 1893 (repealed)	56 & 57 Vict. c. 60	22 September 1893
An Act to apply a sum out of the Consolidated Fund to the service of the year ending on the thirty-first day of March one thousand eight hundred and ninety-four, and to appropriate the Supplies granted in this Session of Parliament. (Repealed by Statute Law Revision Act 1908 (8 Edw. 7. c. 49))
Public Authorities Protection Act 1893 (repealed)	56 & 57 Vict. c. 61	5 December 1893
An Act to generalize and amend certain statutory provisions for the protection of persons acting in the execution of statutory and other public duties. (Repealed for England and Wales and Scotland by Law Reform (Limitation of Actions, etc.) Act 1954 (2 & 3 Eliz. 2. c. 36) and for Northern Ireland by Law Reform (Miscellaneous Provisions) Act (Northern Ireland) 1954 (c. 26 (N.I.)))
Madras and Bombay Armies Act 1893 (repealed)	56 & 57 Vict. c. 62	5 December 1893
An Act to amend the Law relating to the Madras and Bombay Armies. (Repealed by Government of India Act 1935 (26 Geo. 5 & 1 Edw. 8. c. 2))
Married Women's Property Act 1893	56 & 57 Vict. c. 63	5 December 1893
An Act to amend the Married Women's Property Act, 1882. (Note: Married Women's Property Act 1882 (45 & 46 Vict. c. 75)) (Repealed for Northern Ireland by Statute Law Revision (Northern Ireland) Act 1976 (c. 12))
National Debt Redemption Act 1893 (repealed)	56 & 57 Vict. c. 64	5 December 1893
An Act to authorise the Redemption of the New Three pounds ten shillings per centum Annuities. (Repealed by Statute Law Revision Act 1908 (8 Edw. 7. c. 49))
Public Works Loans (No. 3) Act 1893 (repealed)	56 & 57 Vict. c. 65	5 December 1893
An Act to amend certain provisions relating to Local Loans in Ireland. (Repealed by Statute Law Revision Act 1908 (8 Edw. 7. c. 49) and Public Works, etc., Loans Act (Northern Ireland) 1953 (c. 13 (N.I.)))
Rules Publication Act 1893 (repealed)	56 & 57 Vict. c. 66	21 December 1893
An Act for the Publication of Statutory Rules. (Repealed by Statute Law Revision Act 1908 (8 Edw. 7. c. 49), for England and Wales and Scotland by Statutory Instruments Act 1946 (9 & 10 Geo. 6. c. 36) and for Northern Ireland by Northern Ireland Act 1955 (3 & 4 Eliz. 2. c. 8))
Shop Hours Act 1893 (repealed)	56 & 57 Vict. c. 67	21 December 1893
An Act to amend the Shop Hours Act, 1892. (Note: Shop Hours Act 1892 (55 & 56 Vict. c. 62)) (Repealed for England and Wales and Scotland by Shops Act 1911 (1 & 2 Geo. 5. c. 54) and for Northern Ireland by Shops Act 1912 (2 & 3 Geo. 5. c. 3))
Isolation Hospitals Act 1893 (repealed)	56 & 57 Vict. c. 68	21 December 1893
An Act for enabling County Councils to promote the establishment of Hospitals for the reception of Patients suffering from Infectious Diseases. (Repealed by Public Health Act 1936 (26 Geo. 5 & 1 Edw. 8. c. 49))
Savings Bank Act 1893 (repealed)	56 & 57 Vict. c. 69	21 December 1893
An Act to amend the Law relating to Savings Banks. (Repealed by Post Office Act 1969 (c. 48))
East India Loan Act 1893 (repealed)	56 & 57 Vict. c. 70	21 December 1893
An Act to enable the Secretary of State in Council of India to raise Money in the United Kingdom for the Service of the Government of India, and for other purposes relating thereto. (Repealed by East India Loans Act 1937 (1 Edw. 8 & 1 Geo. 6. c. 14))

=== Local acts ===
Short title	Citation	Royal assent
Long title
Manchester, Sheffield and Lincolnshire Railway (Extension to London, &c.) Act 1893	56 & 57 Vict. c. i	28 March 1893
An Act to authorise the Manchester Sheffield and Lincolnshire Railway Company to complete a through Railway communication to London, from their authorised Railway at Annesley, by way of Nottingham, Leicester, Loughborough, Lutterworth, Rugby, and other Towns, and Quainton Road with a new Station in London; to confer further powers on the Company and other Companies; and for other purposes.
Buenos Aires and Pacific Railway Company Act 1893	56 & 57 Vict. c. ii	28 March 1893
An Act for authorising the Buenos Ayres and Pacific Railway Company Limited and the Buenos Ayres and Pacific Railway Equipment and Goods Depôt Company Limited respectively to prepare and carry into effect a Scheme or Schemes of Arrangement with their respective Debenture Stock Holders Creditors or Shareholders or any class or classes of such persons or with the Debenture Stock Holders Creditors or Shareholders of each other and to amalgamate their undertakings and for other purposes.
Manchester Ship Canal Act 1893	56 & 57 Vict. c. iii	28 March 1893
An Act to confer further powers upon the Manchester Ship Canal Company.
Baker Street and Waterloo Railway Act 1893	56 & 57 Vict. c. iv	28 March 1893
An Act for incorporating the Baker Street and Waterloo Railway Company and for empowering them to construct Underground Railways from Baker Street Station to Waterloo Station in the county of London and for other purposes.
Cork and Fermoy and Waterford and Wexford Railway (Guarantee) Act 1893 (repealed)	56 & 57 Vict. c. v	28 March 1893
An Act to authorise the Corporation of Cork to grant a guarantee in respect of a portion of the Share Capital of the Cork and Fermoy and Waterford and Wexford Railway Company and for other purposes. (Repealed by Statute Law (Repeals) Act 2013 (c. 2))
Dublin Distillers' Company Act 1893	56 & 57 Vict. c. vi	28 March 1893
An Act to alter the Memorandum and Articles of Association of the Dublin Distillers' Company (Limited) to enable that Company to have their Registered Offices in Ireland and for other purposes.
Imperial Continental Gas Association Act 1893 (repealed)	56 & 57 Vict. c. vii	28 March 1893
An Act to extend the borrowing powers of the Imperial Continental Gas Association. (Repealed by Imperial Continental Gas Association Act 1929 (19 & 20 Geo. 5. c. lxxxix))
Tramways Orders (1892) Confirmation Act 1893	56 & 57 Vict. c. viii	28 March 1893
An Act to confirm certain Provisional Orders made by the Board of Trade under the Tramways Act, 1870, (Note: Tramways Act 1870 (33 & 34 Vict. c. 78)) relating to Bedford and Kempston Tramway, Perth and District Tramways, and Somerton, Keinton-Mandeville, and Castle Cary Tramways.
	Bedford and Kempston Tramway Order 1893 Order authorising the Construction of a Tramway in the Borough of Bedford and in the Parish of Kempston, in the County of Bedford.	
	Perth and District Tramways Order 1893 Order authorising the construction of Tramways between the City and Burgh of Perth and New Scone.	
	Somerton, Keinton-Mandeville and Castle Cary Tramways Order 1893 Order authorising the construction of Tramways between Somerton, Butleigh, Keinton-Mandeville, and Castle Cary, in the County of Somerset.	
London and Blackwall Railway Act 1893	56 & 57 Vict. c. ix	29 April 1893
An Act to further extend the time limited for the completion of the works authorised by the London and Blackwall Railway Act 1885 (Note: London and Blackwall Railway Act 1885 (48 & 49 Vict. c. cxiv)) and to authorise the raising of additional capital and for other purposes.
Belfast Castle (Cave Hill Footpath) Act 1893	56 & 57 Vict. c. x	29 April 1893
An Act to stop up and discontinue a portion of a certain footpath on the Belfast Castle Estate and to construct another footpath in lieu thereof.
Scottish Provident Institution Act 1893 (repealed)	56 & 57 Vict. c. xi	29 April 1893
An Act to confer further powers on the Scottish Provident Institution and on the directors thereof and for other purposes. (Repealed by Scottish Provident Institution Act 1927 (17 & 18 Geo. 5. c. xv))
South Level and Eau Brink Act 1893	56 & 57 Vict. c. xii	29 April 1893
An Act to transfer to the Drainage and Navigation Commissioners constituted by the Local and Personal Act 7 & 8 George IV. chapter xlvii. (Note: Bedford Level Drainage Act 1827 (7 & 8 Geo. 4. c. xlvii)) the Property Powers and Duties of the Eau Brink Navigation Commissioners and to amend that Act and the Ouse Outfall Act 1860 (Note: Ouse Outfall Act 1860 (23 & 24 Vict. c. lxxxviii)) and for other purposes.
Guardian Assurance Company Act 1893	56 & 57 Vict. c. xiii	29 April 1893
An Act to enable the Guardian Fire and Life Assurance Company as from the date of its registration as a limited Company to alter the form of its constitution by substituting a Memorandum and Articles of Association for its Deed of Settlement and to repeal the Acts relating to such Company and for other purposes.
St. George the Martyr, Southwark (Rector's Rate) Act 1893	56 & 57 Vict. c. xiv	29 April 1893
An Act to provide for the abolition of the rector's rate leviable in the parish of Saint George the Martyr Southwark in the county of Surrey for securing otherwise an income for the rector of that parish and for other purposes.
Dublin Corporation Act 1893 (repealed)	56 & 57 Vict. c. xv	29 April 1893
An Act to authorise the Right Honourable the Lord Mayor Aldermen and Burgesses of Dublin to raise further Moneys by borrowing and for other purposes. (Repealed by Statute Law (Repeals) Act 2013 (c. 2))
Stockton-on-Tees Corporation (Gas) Act 1893	56 & 57 Vict. c. xvi	29 April 1893
An Act to extend the limits within which the Mayor Aldermen and Burgesses of the Borough of Stockton-on-Tees may supply Gas to enable them to borrow further money for their Gas Undertaking and for other purposes.
Water of Leith Purification and Sewerage (Additional Powers) Act 1893	56 & 57 Vict. c. xvii	29 April 1893
An Act to enable the Water of Leith Purification and Sewerage Commissioners to construct additional works and to borrow additional Money and for other purposes.
Wolverhampton Gas Act 1893	56 & 57 Vict. c. xviii	29 April 1893
An Act for conferring further powers on the Wolverhampton Gas Company.
Manchester Corporation (Ship Canal) Act 1893	56 & 57 Vict. c. xix	12 May 1893
An Act to amend the Manchester Ship Canal Act 1891 (Note: Manchester Ship Canal Act 1891 (54 & 55 Vict. c. clxxxi)) and to confer further powers upon the mayor aldermen and citizens of the city of Manchester in the county of Lancaster and the Manchester Ship Canal Company with respect to the lending and borrowing of moneys for the completion of the undertaking of the said Company and for other purposes
Midlothian County Buildings Act 1893	56 & 57 Vict. c. xx	12 May 1893
An Act to vest the county buildings of the county of Mid-Lothian in the County Council of that county to enable the County Council to borrow money for the purpose of erecting and enlarging county buildings and for other purposes.
Mercantile Bank of India (Limited) Act 1893	56 & 57 Vict. c. xxi	12 May 1893
An Act to extend the powers of the Mercantile Bank of India Limited Mercantile Bank of India (Limited).
Rathmines and Rathgar Township Act 1893	56 & 57 Vict. c. xxii	12 May 1893
An Act to confirm and legalise certain waterworks constructed by the Rathmines and Rathgar Improvement Commissioners and to authorise the Commissioners to construct additional works to acquire lands and maintain a public park at Harold's Cross to provide for additional public buildings and the maintenance of a way as a public road to confer on the Commissioners further powers as to the borrowing of moneys and for other purposes relating to the township.
Manchester Ship Canal (Additional Capital, &c.) Act 1893	56 & 57 Vict. c. xxiii	12 May 1893
An Act to enable the Manchester Ship Canal Company to raise additional loan capital and to extend the time for the completion of their undertaking and for other purposes.
Guiseley, Yeadon, and Headingley Railway (Abandonment) Act 1893 (repealed)	56 & 57 Vict. c. xxiv	12 May 1893
An Act for the Abandonment of the Headingley Extension Railway of the Guiseley Yeadon and Headingley Railway Company and for other purposes. (Repealed by Statute Law (Repeals) Act 2013 (c. 2))
Kensington, Knightsbridge, and Chelsea Electric Lighting Act 1893	56 & 57 Vict. c. xxv	12 May 1893
An Act for confirming an Agreement for the transfer to the Kensington and Knightsbridge Electric Lighting Company (Limited) of the Undertaking of the Chelsea Electricity Supply Company (Limited) authorised by the South Kensington Electric Lighting Order 1889.
Wirral Railway Act 1893	56 & 57 Vict. c. xxvi	12 May 1893
An Act to extend the time for the completion of certain authorised railways of the Wirral Railway Company and renew the powers for the purchase of land for one of such railways to reduce the capital of the Company and for other purposes.
Manchester Corporation Act 1893	56 & 57 Vict. c. xxvii	12 May 1893
An Act to confer further powers upon the mayor aldermen and citizens of the city of Manchester in the county of Lancaster with respect to slaughter-houses markets and other matters and to acquire lands therefor and for other purposes.
Staines and Egham District Gas and Coke Company's Preference Capital Act 1893 (repealed)	56 & 57 Vict. c. xxviii	12 May 1893
An Act to confirm and make valid the creation and issue of preference shares by the Staines and Egham District Gas and Coke Company Limited and for other purposes. (Repealed by Brentford Gas Act 1914 (4 & 5 Geo. 5. c. lxxiii))
New Swindon Gas Act 1893	56 & 57 Vict. c. xxix	12 May 1893
An Act to incorporate and confer powers on the New Swindon Gas Company.
Weston-super-Mare Grand Pier Act 1893	56 & 57 Vict. c. xxx	12 May 1893
An Act for incorporating and conferring powers on the Weston-super-Mare Grand Pier Company and for other purposes.
Salford Improvement Act 1893	56 & 57 Vict. c. xxxi	12 May 1893
An Act to enable the mayor aldermen and burgesses of the county borough of Salford to construct street works and to raise additional moneys by mortgage and by the creation and issue of Corporation stock and to make further provisions for the improvement and good government of the borough.
Post Office Sites Act 1893 (repealed)	56 & 57 Vict. c. xxxii	12 May 1893
An Act to enable Her Majesty's Postmaster-General to acquire Lands in London, Liverpool, and Leeds, for the Public Service, and for other purposes. (Repealed by Postal Services Act 2011 (Consequential Modifications and Amendments) Order 2011 (SI 2003/1542))
Suffolk Joint Committee (Borrowing Powers) Act 1893 (repealed)	56 & 57 Vict. c. xxxiii	12 May 1893
An Act to enable the Joint Committee of the County Councils of East and West Suffolk to borrow money. (Repealed by County of Suffolk Act 1904 (4 Edw. 7. c. clvii))
Local Government Board (Ireland) Provisional Order Confirmation (No. 1) Act 1893	56 & 57 Vict. c. xxxiv	12 May 1893
An Act to confirm a Provisional Order made by the Local Government Board for Ireland under the Housing of the Working Classes Act, 1890, (Note: Housing of the Working Classes Act 1890 (53 & 54 Vict. c. 70)) relating to the City of Dublin.
	City of Dublin Order 1893 The Local Government Board for Ireland. City of Dublin. Provisional Order confirming an Improvement Scheme under Part 1. of the Housing of the Working Classes Act, 1890.	
Electric Lighting Orders Confirmation (No. 2) Act 1893	56 & 57 Vict. c. xxxv	9 June 1893
An Act to confirm certain Provisional Orders made by the Board of Trade under the Electric Lighting Acts, 1882 (Note: Electric Lighting Act 1882 (45 & 46 Vict. c. 56)) and 1888, (Note: Electric Lighting Act 1888 (51 & 52 Vict. c. 12)) relating to Beckenham, Colchester, Eccles, and Newcastle-upon-Tyne.
	Beckenham Electric Lighting Order 1893 Provisional Order granted by the Board of Trade under the Electric Lighting Acts, 1882 and 1888, to the Beckenham Local Board, in respect of the Urban Sanitary District of Beckenham, in the County of Kent.	
	Colchester Electric Lighting Order 1893 Provisional Order granted by the Board of Trade under the Electric Lighting Acts 1882 and 1888 to the Mayor Aldermen and Burgesses of the Borough of Colchester in respect of the Borough of Colchester.	
	Eccles Electric Lighting Order 1893 Provisional Order granted by the Board of Trade under the Electric Lighting Acts 1882 and 1888 to the Mayor Aldermen and Burgesses of the Borough of Eccles in respect of the Borough of Eccles in the County of Lancaster.	
	Newcastle-upon-Tyne Electric Lighting Order 1893 Provisional Order granted by the Board of Trade under the Electric Lighting Acts 1882 and 1888 to the Newcastle-upon-Tyne Electric Supply Company, Limited, in respect of the City of Newcastle-upon-Tyne.	
Pilotage Orders Confirmation Act 1893 (repealed)	56 & 57 Vict. c. xxxvi	9 June 1893
An Act to confirm certain Provisional Orders made by the Board of Trade under the Merchant Shipping (Pilotage) Act, 1889, (Note: Merchant Shipping (Pilotage) Act 1889 (52 & 53 Vict. c. 68)) relating to Liverpool and Newport (Monmouthshire). (Repealed by Statute Law (Repeals) Act 1995 (c. 44))
	Newport Pilotage Order 1893	
	Newport (Monmouthshire) Pilotage Order 1893	
Military Lands Provisional Orders Confirmation Act 1893 (repealed)	56 & 57 Vict. c. xxxvii	9 June 1893
An Act to confirm certain Provisional Orders of the Secretary of State under the Military Lands Act, 1892. (Note: Military Lands Act 1892 (55 & 56 Vict. c. 43)) (Repealed by Statute Law (Repeals) Act 2008 (c. 12))
	Buttevant Barracks Enlargement Order 1893 A Provisional Order made in pursuance of Section Two of the Military Lands Act, 1892, authorising the purchase of land for the improvement of Buttevant Barracks, in the county of Cork.	
Local Government Board (Ireland) Provisional Order Confirmation (No. 2) Act 1893	56 & 57 Vict. c. xxxviii	9 June 1893
An Act to confirm a Provisional Order made by the Local Government Board for Ireland under the Public Health (Ireland) Act, 1878, (Note: Public Health (Ireland) Act 1878 (41 & 42 Vict. c. 52)) relating to the Union of Ballycastle.
	Ballycastle Waterworks Provisional Order 1893 The Local Government Board for Ireland. Ballycastle Waterworks. Provisional Order.	
Metropolitan Commons (Orpington) Supplemental Act 1893	56 & 57 Vict. c. xxxix	9 June 1893
An Act to confirm a Scheme under the Metropolitan Commons Acts, 1866 to 1878, relating to Broom Hill Common, Darrick Common, Gumping Common, and Sparrow Common, in the Parish of Orpington, Kent.
	Scheme with respect to Broom Hill Common, Darrick Common, Gumping Common, and Sparrow Common.	
Electric Lighting Orders Confirmation (No. 3) Act 1893	56 & 57 Vict. c. xl	9 June 1893
An Act to confirm certain Provisional Orders made by the Board of Trade under the Electric Lighting Acts, 1882 and 1888, relating to Hackney, Hammersmith, and Poplar.
	Hackney Electric Lighting Order 1893 Provisional Order granted by the Board of Trade under the Electric Lighting Acts 1882 and 1888 to the Board of Works for the Hackney District in the County of London in respect of the Hackney District.	
	Hammersmith Electric Lighting Order 1893 Provisional Order granted by the Board of Trade under the Electric Lighting Acts 1882 and 1888 to the Vestry of the Parish of Hammersmith in respect of the Parish of Hammersmith in the administrative County of London.	
	Poplar District Electric Lighting Order 1893 Provisional Order under the Electric Lighting Acts 1882 and 1888 to the Board of Works for the Poplar District in the County of London in respect of the Poplar District.	
Harrow Road and Paddington Tramways Act 1893	56 & 57 Vict. c. xli	9 June 1893
An Act to extend the time for the compulsory purchase of Lands and for the completion of the Tramways authorised by the Harrow Road and Paddington Tramways Act 1891. (Note: Harrow Road and Paddington Tramways Act 1891 (54 & 55 Vict. c. clxviii))
Sheffield Corporation (Water) Act 1893 (repealed)	56 & 57 Vict. c. xlii	9 June 1893
An Act to amend the provisions of the Sheffield Corporation Water Acts relating to the Water Rents to be taken by the Corporation and to extend the time limited by the Sheffield Waterworks Act 1881 (Note: Sheffield Waterworks Act 1881 (44 & 45 Vict. c. xxvi)) for the completion of certain Reservoirs and for other purposes. (Repealed by Sheffield Corporation (Consolidation) Act 1918 (8 & 9 Geo. 5. c. lxi))
Mutual Life Assurance Society Act 1893 (repealed)	56 & 57 Vict. c. xliii	9 June 1893
An Act to define the objects and members of the Mutual Life Assurance Society and to enlarge the powers of the Society and for other purposes. (Repealed by National Mutual Life Assurance Society's Act 1896 (59 & 60 Vict. c. xliii))
Belfast Harbour Act 1893	56 & 57 Vict. c. xliv	9 June 1893
An Act to consolidate the bond or other debts of the Belfast Harbour Commissioners and to authorise the issue of consolidated stock.
Saint Martin's Rectory (Birmingham) Act 1893	56 & 57 Vict. c. xlv	9 June 1893
An Act to vest a portion of the Glebe Lands of the Rectory of Saint Martin in the City of Birmingham in Trustees upon certain trusts for the benefit (at the discretion of the Trustees) of the Incumbents for the time being of the Ecclesiastical Districts within the area of the ancient parish of Saint Martin Birmingham and for other purposes.
Cork and Fermoy Railway (Waterford and Wexford Section Abandonment) Act 1893 (repealed)	56 & 57 Vict. c. xlvi	9 June 1893
An Act to abandon the Waterford and Wexford section of the undertaking authorised by the Cork and Fermoy and Waterford and Wexford Railway Act 1890 (Note: Cork and Fermoy and Waterford and Wexford Railway Act 1890 (53 & 54 Vict. c. ccxlii)) and for other purposes. (Repealed by Statute Law (Repeals) Act 2013 (c. 2))
Ilkley Local Board Act 1893	56 & 57 Vict. c. xlvii	9 June 1893
An Act for empowering the Local Board for the district of Ilkley in the west riding of the county of York to construct additional waterworks and improve their existing water supply and to purchase the undertaking of the Ilkley Gas Company and for making better provision for the health and government of the district and for other purposes.
West Metropolitan Tramways Act 1893	56 & 57 Vict. c. xlviii	9 June 1893
An Act to extend the time for the completion of certain of the Tramways authorised by the West Metropolitan Tramways Act 1889 (Note: West Metropolitan Tramways Act 1889 (52 & 53 Vict. c. ccii)) and for other purposes.
Glasgow and South Western Railway Act 1893	56 & 57 Vict. c. xlix	9 June 1893
An Act for conferring further powers on the Glasgow and South Western Railway Company for the acquisition of lands and the raising of money for empowering the City of Glasgow Union Railway Company to construct a new Railway and for other purposes.
Sheffield Corporation (Street Widenings) Act 1893 (repealed)	56 & 57 Vict. c. l	9 June 1893
An Act to provide for the Improvement of High Street in the City of Sheffield and for other purposes. (Repealed by Sheffield Corporation (Consolidation) Act 1918 (8 & 9 Geo. 5. c. lxi))
Ayr Harbour Act 1893	56 & 57 Vict. c. li	9 June 1893
An Act for enabling the Ayr Harbour Trustees to convert their Mortgage Debt into Debenture Stock for altering the Constitution of the Trust and for other purposes.
Great Eastern Railway (General Powers) Act 1893	56 & 57 Vict. c. lii	9 June 1893
An Act for conferring further powers upon the Great Eastern Railway Company for extending the periods limited for the compulsory purchase of certain Lands and for the completion of certain Works for confirming an Agreement for the purchase of the undertaking of the Wivenhoe and Brightlingsea Railway Company for authorising Agreements between the London and Blackwall Railway Company the Company and the Midland Railway Company for amendment of Acts and for other purposes.
Costa Rica Railway Company Act 1893	56 & 57 Vict. c. liii	9 June 1893
An Act for authorising the Costa Rica Railway Company Limited to borrow further moneys and to make provision in reference thereto and for other purposes.
Altrincham Gas Act 1893	56 & 57 Vict. c. liv	9 June 1893
An Act for conferring further powers on the Altrincham Gas Company for the construction of works acquisition of lands laying down and maintenance of tramway and works the raising of additional capital and for other purposes.
Bolton Corporation Tramways Act 1893	56 & 57 Vict. c. lv	9 June 1893
An Act to enable the Mayor Aldermen and Burgesses of the Borough of Bolton to work their own and certain suburban Tramways and for other purposes.
Edinburgh Street Tramways Act 1893 (repealed)	56 & 57 Vict. c. lvi	9 June 1893
An Act to authorise the Edinburgh Street Tramways Company to make and maintain additional Tramways and to confer further powers upon that Company. (Repealed by Edinburgh Corporation Order Confirmation Act 1932 (22 & 23 Geo. 5. c. vii))
Midland and Great Northern Railways (Eastern and Midland Railway) Act 1893	56 & 57 Vict. c. lvii	9 June 1893
An Act for vesting in the Midland and Great Northern Railway Companies the undertaking and powers of the Eastern and Midlands Railway Company and for other purposes.
Midland Railway Act 1893	56 & 57 Vict. c. lviii	9 June 1893
An Act to confer Additional Powers upon the Midland Railway Company for the Construction of Works and the Acquisition of Lands and for other purposes.
Plymouth Corporation Water Act 1893	56 & 57 Vict. c. lix	9 June 1893
An Act to confer further powers on the Corporation of Plymouth in regard to the construction of additional waterworks and for other purposes.
London Hydraulic Power Company's Act 1893	56 & 57 Vict. c. lx	9 June 1893
An Act to empower the London Hydraulic Power Company to raise additional capital and for other purposes.
Stirling Waterworks Act 1893	56 & 57 Vict. c. lxi	9 June 1893
An Act to authorise the Stirling Waterworks Commissioners to acquire additional lands and to make and maintain additional works and for other purposes.
East Stonehouse Water Act 1893 (repealed)	56 & 57 Vict. c. lxii	9 June 1893
An Act for empowering the Local Board for the District of East Stonehouse in the County of Devon to improve their existing Water Supply, and for other purposes. (Repealed by Plymouth Corporation Act 1915 (5 & 6 Geo. 5. c. lxix))
Barking Town Wharf Act 1893	56 & 57 Vict. c. lxiii	9 June 1893
An Act for vesting the Barking Town Wharf at Barking in the county of Essex in the Barking Town Local Board and for other purposes.
Rhondda and Swansea Bay Railway Act 1893	56 & 57 Vict. c. lxiv	9 June 1893
An Act to confer Further Powers upon the Rhondda and Swansea Bay Railway Company and for other purposes.
Brighton and Hove Gas Act 1893	56 & 57 Vict. c. lxv	9 June 1893
An Act to confer further powers upon the Brighton and Hove General Gas Company to extend their limits for the supply of Gas to authorise the construction of New Works and the raising of additional Capital and for other purposes.
London Streets (Removal of Gates, Bars, &c.) Act 1893 (repealed)	56 & 57 Vict. c. lxvi	9 June 1893
An Act to provide for the Removal of Obstructions in certain Streets of London. (Repealed by Local Law (Greater London Council and Inner London Boroughs) Order 1965 (SI 1965/540))
Paddington Recreation Ground Act 1893	56 & 57 Vict. c. lxvii	9 June 1893
An Act to authorise the Acquisition Preservation and Management of Lands in the Parish of Paddington for the purposes of a Recreation Ground.
Great Eastern Railway (New Line and Improvements at Cambridge, &c.) Act 1893	56 & 57 Vict. c. lxviii	9 June 1893
An Act for enabling the Great Eastern Railway Company to construct a new railway and other works in the county of Cambridge and for other purposes.
Govan Burgh (Tramways) Act 1893 (repealed)	56 & 57 Vict. c. lxix	29 June 1893
An Act to authorise the Commissioners of Police of the burgh of Govan to purchase portions of the Vale of Clyde Tramways and of the Glasgow and Ibrox Tramway in the county of Lanark to authorise the use of mechanical power on all the tramways of the Commissioners and for other purposes. (Repealed by Glasgow Corporation Consolidation (Water, Transport and Markets) Order Confirmation Act 1964 (c. xliii))
Dublin (South) City Market Act 1893	56 & 57 Vict. c. lxx	29 June 1893
An Act to amend the Dublin (South City) Market Acts 1876 to 1884 and for other purposes.
London Open Spaces Act 1893	56 & 57 Vict. c. lxxi	29 June 1893
An Act to confer powers on the London County Council with regard to Hackney Marshes Albert Palace Battersea York Water Gate and Hilly Fields Brockley.
Devonport Waterworks Act 1893	56 & 57 Vict. c. lxxii	29 June 1893
An Act for conferring further powers on the Devonport Water Company for the acquisition of lands and the supply of water and for defining and extending their limits of supply and for making provisions for the purchase by the East Stonehouse Local Board of a portion of the undertaking of the Company and for the supply of water in bulk by the Company to that Local Board and for other purposes.
Manchester Ship Canal (Surplus Lands) Act 1893	56 & 57 Vict. c. lxxiii	29 June 1893
An Act to enable the Manchester Ship Canal Company to sell and otherwise deal with Surplus Lands and for other purposes.
North Eastern Railway Act 1893	56 & 57 Vict. c. lxxiv	29 June 1893
An Act for enabling the North Eastern Railway Company to make new Railways and other works and to acquire additional lands and for other purposes.
Perth Improvement Act 1893	56 & 57 Vict. c. lxxv	29 June 1893
An Act for the Improvement of the City and Royal Burgh of Perth and the construction of new and the widening and improvement of existing streets therein and for other purposes.
Todmorden Local Board Gas Purchases Act 1893	56 & 57 Vict. c. lxxvi	29 June 1893
An Act to authorise the transfer of the Undertaking of the Todmorden Gas Company and other Gas Undertakings to the Todmorden Local Board and for other purposes.
Barry and Cadoxton Local Board (Gas and Water) Act 1893 (repealed)	56 & 57 Vict. c. lxxvii	29 June 1893
An Act for authorising the Local Board for the district of Barry and Cadoxton in the county of Glamorgan to acquire the Gas and Water Undertakings of the Barry and Cadoxton Gas and Water Company and to supply their district and other places with Gas and Water and for other purposes. (Repealed by County of South Glamorgan Act 1976 (c. xxxv))
Edinburgh Corporation Tramways Act 1893 (repealed)	56 & 57 Vict. c. lxxviii	29 June 1893
An Act to authorise cable power to be used on the tramways acquired by the Lord Provost magistrates and town council of the city and royal burgh of Edinburgh and for other purposes. (Repealed by Edinburgh Corporation Order Confirmation Act 1932 (22 & 23 Geo. 5. c. vii))
Manchester, Sheffield, and Lincolnshire Railway Act 1893	56 & 57 Vict. c. lxxix	29 June 1893
An Act to confer further powers upon the Manchester Sheffield and Lincolnshire Railway Company and upon the St. Helens and Wigan Junction Railway Company the Wrexham Mold and Connah's Quay Railway Company and the Blackpool Railway Company and for other purposes.
Folkestone Corporation Act 1893	56 & 57 Vict. c. lxxx	29 June 1893
An Act to enable the Corporation of the borough of Folkestone in the county of Kent to establish and maintain public band stands and bands and for other purposes.
Thames Watermen's and Lightermen's Act 1893 (repealed)	56 & 57 Vict. c. lxxxi	29 June 1893
An Act to make better provision with respect to the registration and measurement of and other matters affecting certain craft for carrying goods and certain boats for carrying persons within the limits of the Watermen's and Lightermen's Amendment Act 1859 (Note: Watermen's and Lightermen's Amendment Act 1859 (22 & 23 Vict. c. cxxxiii)) and for other purposes. (Repealed by Port of London (Consolidation) Act 1920 (10 & 11 Geo. 5. c. clxxiii))
Mersey Dock (Tranmere Lands) Act 1893 (repealed)	56 & 57 Vict. c. lxxxii	29 June 1893
An Act to confirm an Agreement entered into by the Mersey Docks and Harbour Board for the Purchase of certain Lands at Tranmere and for other purposes. (Repealed by Mersey Docks and Harbour Act 1971 (c. lvii))
General Life Assurance Company's Act 1893	56 & 57 Vict. c. lxxxiii	29 June 1893
An Act to change the Name of the General Life and Fire Assurance Company and to amend the Deed of Settlement and Acts of Parliament of the Company and for other purposes.
Croydon Corporation Act 1893 (repealed)	56 & 57 Vict. c. lxxxiv	29 June 1893
An Act to confer further powers upon the Mayor Aldermen and Burgesses of the County Borough of Croydon. (Repealed by Croydon Corporation Act 1960 (8 & 9 Eliz. 2. c. xl))
City of London Electric Lighting Act 1893	56 & 57 Vict. c. lxxxv	29 June 1893
An Act for amending the City of London Electric Lighting (Brush) Order 1890 and the City of London (East District) Electric Lighting Order 1890 as confirmed by the Electric Lighting Orders Confirmation (No. 15) Act 1890 (Note: Electric Lighting Orders Confirmation (No. 15) Act 1890 (53 & 54 Vict. c. ccxxxix)) and the City of London Electric Lighting (Brush) Order 1891 as confirmed by the Electric Lighting Orders Confirmation (No. 10) Act 1891. (Note: Electric Lighting Orders Confirmation (No. 10) Act 1891 (54 & 55 Vict. c. ccxii))
Blackpool Improvement Act 1893	56 & 57 Vict. c. lxxxvi	29 June 1893
An Act to confer further powers on the Mayor Aldermen and Burgesses of the Borough of Blackpool for the Improvement and good Government of the Borough and for other purposes.
South Western Railway Act 1893	56 & 57 Vict. c. lxxxvii	29 June 1893
An Act to authorise the London and South Western Railway Company to construct a new Graving Dock at Southampton and to widen their Railway at Waterloo Station to confirm and give effect to an Agreement between the Most Noble William Duke of Devonshire and the Chiswick Local Board and the Company to confer further powers upon the Company and to make further provision with respect to their Undertaking and to confer further powers upon the Company and the London Brighton and South Coast Railway Company and the Midland Railway Company respectively in reference to Joint Lines and for other purposes.
North West Central Railway (Abandonment) Act 1893 (repealed)	56 & 57 Vict. c. lxxxviii	29 June 1893
An Act for the Abandonment of the North West Central Railway. (Repealed by Statute Law (Repeals) Act 2013 (c. 2))
Cheadle Railway Mineral and Land Company Act 1893	56 & 57 Vict. c. lxxxix	29 June 1893
An Act to extend the time for the Completion of the authorised Railway of the Cheadle Railway Mineral and Land Company Limited and for other purposes.
Continental Metropolitan Tramways Company Act 1893	56 & 57 Vict. c. xc	29 June 1893
An Act for conferring further powers upon the Continental Metropolitan Tramways Company Limited.
Highland Railway Act 1893	56 & 57 Vict. c. xci	29 June 1893
An Act to empower the Highland Railway Company to construct an Extension of their Railway from Strome Ferry to Kyle of Lochalsh to erect a Pier at Kyle and for other purposes.
South Staffordshire Waterworks Act 1893	56 & 57 Vict. c. xcii	29 June 1893
An Act to authorise the South Staffordshire Waterworks Company to construct New Reservoirs and other Works and to raise further Capital and for other purposes.
Corporation of London (Tower Bridge) Extension of Time Act 1893	56 & 57 Vict. c. xciii	29 June 1893
An Act to extend the time for the completion of works authorised by the Corporation of London (Tower Bridge) Acts 1885 (Note: Corporation of London (Tower Bridge) Act 1885 (48 & 49 Vict. c. cxcv)) and 1889. (Note: Corporation of London (Tower Bridge) Act 1889 (52 & 53 Vict. c. cxlix))
Warkworth Harbour Act 1893	56 & 57 Vict. c. xciv	29 June 1893
An Act to make provision with respect to the existing Idebt of the Commissioners of Warkworth Harbour in the county of Northumberland and to empower them to borrow additional moneys and for other purposes.
Lancashire and Yorkshire Railway Act 1893	56 & 57 Vict. c. xcv	29 June 1893
An Act for conferring further powers on the Lancashire and Yorkshire Railway Company with relation to their own Undertaking and upon that Company and the London and North Western Railway Company in respect of Undertakings in which they are jointly interested and for other purposes.
Belfast Street Tramways Act 1893	56 & 57 Vict. c. xcvi	29 June 1893
An Act to confirm an agreement between the Lord Mayor Aldermen and Citizens of the City of Belfast and the Belfast Street Tramways Company and for other purposes.
Fishguard Bay Railway and Pier Act 1893	56 & 57 Vict. c. xcvii	29 June 1893
An Act for authorising the construction of a Railway with a Pier and Breakwater in connexion therewith at Fishguard Bay in the county of Pembroke and for other purposes.
Great Northern Railway Act 1893	56 & 57 Vict. c. xcviii	29 June 1893
An Act to confer further Powers upon the Great Northern Railway Company with respect to their own Undertaking and Undertakings in which they are jointly interested and for other purposes.
Law Life Assurance Society Act 1893	56 & 57 Vict. c. xcix	29 June 1893
An Act to extend the objects and powers of investment of the Law Life Assurance Society to empower the Proprietors of the Society to make Regulations for its government and the management of its affairs and for other purposes.
South Eastern Railway Act 1893	56 & 57 Vict. c. c	29 June 1893
An Act to authorise the execution of certain works and to confer further powers on the South Eastern Railway Company in reference to their own undertaking and the undertakings of other companies and for other purposes.
Pontypridd Local Board (Gas) Act 1893	56 & 57 Vict. c. ci	29 June 1893
An Act to authorise the Local Board for the district of Pontypridd in the county of Glamorgan to purchase the undertaking of the Pontypridd Gaslight and Coke Company and for other purposes.
Commons Regulation (West Tilbury) Provisional Order Confirmation Act 1893	56 & 57 Vict. c. cii	29 June 1893
An Act to confirm a Provisional Order of the Board of Agriculture relating to the Regulation of the Commons in the parish of West Tilbury in the county of Essex.
	West Tilbury Commons (Essex) Regulation Order 1893 Provisional Order for the regulation of West Tilbury Commons, Essex.	
Pier and Harbour Orders Confirmation (No. 1) Act 1893	56 & 57 Vict. c. ciii	29 June 1893
An Act to confirm certain Provisional Orders made by the Board of Trade under the General Pier and Harbour Act, 1861, (Note: General Pier and Harbour Act 1861 (24 & 25 Vict. c. 45)) relating to Criccieth, Morecambe, Teignmouth, Tenby, Torquay, and Weymouth.
	Criccieth Pier and Harbour Order 1893 Order for the construction, maintenance, and regulation of a Breakwater Pier and Harbour at Criccieth, in the County of Carnarvon.	
	Morecambe Pier Order 1893 Order for the Construction of a Pier and Works at Morecambe, in the County of Lancaster.	
	Teignmouth Quays Order 1893 Order for the construction of new Quays in the River Teign and other Works in connection therewith at West Teignmouth, in the county of Devon.	
	Tenby Pier and Promenade Order 1893 Order for the Construction, Maintenance, and Regulation of a Pier at Tenby, in the County of Pembroke.	
	Torquay Harbour Order 1893 Order for extending the time for the Construction of the Works authorised by the Torquay Harbour Order, 1888.	
	Weymouth Harbour Order 1893 Order for amending The Weymouth and Melcombe Regis Corporation Act, 1887. (Note: Weymouth and Melcombe Regis Corporation Act 1887 (50 & 51 Vict. c. cliii))	
Pier and Harbour Orders Confirmation (No. 2) Act 1893	56 & 57 Vict. c. civ	29 June 1893
An Act to confirm certain Provisional Orders made by the Board of Trade under the General Pier and Harbour Act, 1861, relating to Castlehaven, Deal, Sandown, and Southwold.
	Castlehaven Harbour Order 1893 Order for the erection and maintenance of a Lighthouse, and for the improvement of the Harbour of Castlehaven, in the County of Cork, and for the constitution of a Harbour Authority.	
	Deal Harbour Order 1893 Order for the Construction, Mointenance, and Regulation of a Tidal Harbour, Piers, and other Works at Deal, in the County of Kent.	
	Sandown Pier Order 1893 Order for amending the Sandown Pier Order, 1874, and for the Construction, Maintenance, and Regulation of an Extension to the Pier and Works at Sandown, in the Isle of Wight.	
	Southwold Promenade and Landing Pier Order 1893 Order for the Construction, Maintenance, and Regulation of a Promenade and Landing Pier at Southwold, in the County of Suffolk.	
Oyster and Mussel Fishery (Loch Creran) Order Confirmation Act 1893 (repealed)	56 & 57 Vict. c. cv	29 June 1893
An Act to confirm an Order made by the Secretary for Scotland under the Sea Fisheries Act, 1868, (Note: Sea Fisheries Act 1868 (31 & 32 Vict. c. 45)) relating to a several Oyster and Mussel Fishery at Loch Creran, Argyllshire. (Repealed by Statute Law (Repeals) Act 1998 (c. 43))
	Loch Creran Fishery Order 1891 (Note: Although passed in 1893, the short title is specified as the Loch Creran Fishery Order 1891.) Order for Establishment and Maintenance by Mrs. Margaret Ogilvie, of Balcaldine, of a several Oyster and Mussel Fishery at Loch Creran, in the County of Argyll.	
Electric Lighting Order Confirmation (No. 1) Act 1893 (repealed)	56 & 57 Vict. c. cvi	29 June 1893
An Act to confirm a Provisional Order made by the Board of Trade under the Electric Lighting Acts, 1882 to 1890, relating to Partick. (Repealed by South of Scotland Electricity Order Confirmation Act 1956 (c.xciv))
	Partick Electric Lighting Order 1893 Provisional Order granted by the Board of Trade under the Electric Lighting Acts 1882 to 1890 to the Commissioners of Police of the Burgh of Partick in respect of the Burgh of Partick.	
Metropolitan Commons (Banstead) Supplemental Act 1893	56 & 57 Vict. c. cvii	29 June 1893
An Act to confirm a Scheme under the Metropolitan Commons Acts, 1866 to 1878, relating to Banstead Downs, Banstead Heath, Burgh Heath, and Park Downs, in the parish of Banstead, Surrey.
	Scheme with respect to Banstead Downs, Banstead Heath, Burgh Heath, and Park Downs.	
Local Government Board's Provisional Order Confirmation Act 1893	56 & 57 Vict. c. cviii	29 June 1893
An Act to confirm a Provisional Order of the Local Government Board relating to the Borough of Cheltenham.
	Borough of Cheltenham Order 1893 Provisional Order made in pursuance of Sections 54 and 59 of the Local Government Act, 1888. (Note: Local Government Act 1888 (51 & 52 Vict. c. 41))	
Local Government Board's Provisional Orders Confirmation (No. 2) Act 1893	56 & 57 Vict. c. cix	29 June 1893
An Act to confirm certain Provisional Orders of the Local Government Board relating to the Urban Sanitary Districts of Bradford (Yorks), Brentford, Epsom, New Windsor, Stoke-upon-Trent, and Wigan, and to the Hertford and Ware Joint Hospital District.
	Bradford (Yorks) Order 1893 Provisional Order for altering the Bradford Improvement Act, 1873. (Note: Bradford Improvement Act 1873 (36 & 37 Vict. c. clxvii))	
	Brentford Order 1893 Provisional Order to enable the Sanitary Authority for the Urban Sanitary District of Brentford to put in force the Compulsory Clauses of the Lands Clauses Acts.	
	Epsom Order 1893 Provisional Order to enable the Sanitary Authority for the Urban Sanitary District of Epsom to put in force the Compulsory Clauses of the Lands Clauses Acts.	
	Hertford and Ware Joint Hospital Order 1893 Provisional Order for forming a United District under Section 279 of the Public Health Act, 1875. (Note: Public Health Act 1875 (38 & 39 Vict. c. 55))	
	New Windsor Order 1893 Provisional Order to enable the Urban Sanitary Authority for the Borough of New Windsor to put in force the Compulsory Clauses of the Lands Clauses Acts.	
	Stoke-on-Trent Order 1893 Provisional Order for altering a Confirming Act. (Note: Local Government Board's Provisional Orders Confirmation (No. 10) Act 1888 (51 & 52 Vict. c. cxxxiv))	
	Wigan Order 1893 Provisional Order for altering a Confirming Act. (Note: Local Government Board's Provisional Orders Confirmation (No. 7) Act 1888 (51 & 52 Vict. c. cxxi))	
Local Government Board's Provisional Order Confirmation (No. 3) Act 1893 (repealed)	56 & 57 Vict. c. cx	29 June 1893
An Act to confirm a Provisional Order of the Local Government Board relating to the Urban Sanitary Districts of Aberystwith, Bognor, Bridlington, Clifton Dartmouth Hardness, Cockermouth, Kidderminster, Llanelly, Ormskirk, Sheerness, Skipton, Stroud, and Ware. (Repealed by Statute Law (Repeals) Act 1998 (c. 43))
	Aberystwyth, &c. Order 1893 Provisional Order for partially repealing certain Confirming Acts. (Note: Local Government Supplemental Act 1861 (No. 2) (24 & 25 Vict. c. 128)) (Note: Local Government Supplemental Act 1862 (25 & 26 Vict. c. 25)) (Note: Local Government Supplemental Act 1863 (26 & 27 Vict. c. 32)) (Note: Local Government Supplemental Act 1865 (28 & 29 Vict. c. 24)) (Note: Local Government Supplemental Act 1865 (No. 2) (28 & 29 Vict. c. 25)) (Note: Local Government Supplemental Act 1866 (29 & 30 Vict. c. 24)) (Note: Local Government Act 1868 (No. 6) (31 & 32 Vict. c. cliii)) (Note: Local Government Supplemental Act 1868 (No. 5) (31 & 32 Vict. c. lxxxvi)) (Note: Local Government Supplemental Act 1869 (No. 2) (32 & 33 Vict. c. cl)) (Note: Local Government Supplemental Act 1871 (34 & 35 Vict. c. i)) (Note: Local Government Supplemental Act 1871 (No. 2) (34 & 35 Vict. c. lix)) (Note: Local Government Supplemental Act 1871 (No. 4) (34 & 35 Vict. c. clxxxvii))	
Local Government Board Provisional Order Confirmation (Housing of Working Classes) Act 1893	56 & 57 Vict. c. cxi	29 June 1893
An Act to confirm a Provisional Order of the Local Government Board under the Housing of the Working Classes Act, 1890, relating to the Urban Sanitary District of Plymouth.
	Plymouth Order 1893 Provisional Order for confirming an Improvement Scheme under Part I. of the Housing of the Working Classes Act, 1890.	
Railway Rates and Charges (Cranbrook and Paddock Wood Railway, &c.) Order Confirmation Act 1893 (repealed)	56 & 57 Vict. c. cxii	29 June 1893
An Act to confirm a Provisional Order made by the Board of Trade under the Railway and Canal Traffic Act, 1888, (Note: Railway and Canal Traffic Act 1888 (51 & 52 Vict. c. 25)) relating to the Classification of Merchandise Traffic, and the Schedule of Maximum Rates and Charges applicable thereto, of the Cranbrook and Paddock Wood Railway Company, the Glyn Valley Tramway Company, the Manchester Ship Canal Company in respect of the Railways of the said Company, and the Stratford-upon-Avon, Towcester, and Midland Junction Railway Company. (Repealed by Statute Law (Repeals) Act 2013 (c. 2))
	Railway Rates and Charges (Cranbrook and Paddock Wood Railway, &c.) Order 1893 Order of the Board of Trade under the Railway and Canal Traffic Act, 1888, fixing the Classification of Merchandise Traffic, and the Schedule of Maximum Rates and Charges, including all Terminal Charges applicable to the said Classification, of the Cranbrook and Paddock Wood Railway Company, the Glyn Valley Tramway Company, the Manchester Ship Canal Company in respect of the Railways of the said Company, and the Stratford-upon-Avon, Towcester, and Midland Junction Railway Company.	
Edinburgh Improvement Scheme Provisional Order Confirmation Act 1893	56 & 57 Vict. c. cxiii	29 June 1893
An Act to confirm a Provisional Order made by the Secretary for Scotland under Part I. of the Housing of the Working Classes Act, 1890, relating to the City and Royal Burgh of Edinburgh.
	City and Royal Burgh of Edinburgh Improvement Order 1893 Provisional Order for confirming an Improvement Scheme under Part I. of the Housing of the Working Classes Act, 1890.	
Electric Lighting Orders Confirmation (No. 4) Act 1893	56 & 57 Vict. c. cxiv	29 June 1893
An Act to confirm certain Provisional Orders made by the Board of Trade under the Electric Lighting Acts, 1882 and 1888, relating to Altrincham and Bowdon, Barnet, Bridgend, and Taunton.
	Altrincham and Bowdon Electric Lighting Order 1893 Provisional Order granted by the Board of Trade under the Electric Lighting Acts 1882 and 1888 to the Manchester Edison Swan Company Limited in respect of the Local Board Districts of Altrincham and Bowdon and part of the District of the Rural Sanitary Authority for the Altrincham Union in the County of Chester.	
	Barnet Local Board Electric Lighting Order 1893 Provisional Ordér granted by the Board of Trade under the Electric Lighting Acts 1882 and 1888 to the Barnet Local Board in respect of the District of the said Local Board in the Counties of Hertford and Middlesex.	
	Bridgend Electric Lighting Order 1893 Provisional Order granted by the Board of Trade under the Electric Lighting Acts 1882 and 1888 to the Local Board of Bridgend in respect of the Urban Sanitary District of Bridgend in the County of Glamorgan.	
	Taunton (Corporation) Electric Lighting Order 1893 Provisional Order granted by. the Board of Trade under the Electric Lighting Acts 1882 and 1888 to the Mayor Aldermen and Burgesses of the Borough of Taunton in the County of Somerset in respect of the Borough of Taunton and a district adjacent thereto.	
Local Government Board's Provisional Orders Confirmation (No. 4) Act 1893	56 & 57 Vict. c. cxv	29 June 1893
An Act to confirm certain Provisional Orders of the Local Government Board relating to the Urban Sanitary Districts of Barnsley, Carlisle, Chichester, Neath, Newark, Newbury, and Swansea.
	Barnsley Order 1893 Provisional Order for altering a Confirming Act. (Note: Local Government Board's Provisional Orders Confirmation (Alnwick Union, &c.) Act 1880 (43 & 44 Vict. c. lxxxiii))	
	Carlisle Order 1893 Provisional Order for altering the Carlisle Corporation Act, 1887. (Note: Carlisle Corporation Act 1887 (50 & 51 Vict. c. xix))	
	Chichester Order 1893 Provisional Order for altering the mode of defraying the Expenses of an Urban Sanitary Authority.	
	Neath Order 1893 Provisional Order for altering the Neath Corporation Gas Act, 1874. (Note: Neath Corporation Gas Act 1874 (37 & 38 Vict. c. c))	
	Newark Order 1893 Provisional Order for altering the Newark Corporation Act, 1891. (Note: Newark Corporation Act 1891 (54 & 55 Vict. c. cxxii))	
	Newbury Order 1893 Provisional Order for altering the Newbury Borough Extension Act, 1878. (Note: Newbury Borough Extension Act 1878 (41 & 42 Vict. c. clxxxiv))	
	Swansea Order 1893 Provisional Order for altering the Swansea Municipal Corporation Act, 1863. (Note: Swansea Municipal Corporation Act 1863 (26 & 27 Vict. c. xiii))	
Local Government Board's Provisional Orders Confirmation (No. 5) Act 1893	56 & 57 Vict. c. cxvi	29 June 1893
An Act to confirm certain Provisional Orders of the Local Government Board relating to the Epsom (Rural), Sutton, and Carshalton Joint Hospital District, and the Dewsbury Joint Hospital District.
	Epsom (Rural), Sutton and Carshalton Joint Hospital Order 1893 Provisional Order for forming a United District under Section 279 of the Public Health Act, 1875.	
	Dewsbury Joint Hospital Order 1893 Provisional Order for forming a United District under Section 279 of the Public Health Act, 1875.	
Local Government Board's Provisional Orders Confirmation (No. 9) Act 1893	56 & 57 Vict. c. cxvii	29 June 1893
An Act to confirm certain Provisional Orders of the Local Government Board relating to the Urban Sanitary Districts of Ashton in Makerfield, Brighton, Burnley, Llandudno, Newton-in-Mackerfield, Rhyl, and Smethwick.
	Ashton in Makerfield Order 1893 Provisional Order for altering the Ashton in Makerfield Local Board Act, 1875, (Note: Ashton in Makerfield Local Board Act 1875 (38 & 39 Vict. c. xxxviii)) and certain Confirming Acts. (Note: Local Government Board's Provisional Orders Confirmation (Aberavon, &c.) Act 1880 (43 & 44 Vict. c. lxxxvi)) (Note: Local Government Board's Provisional Orders Confirmation (No. 5) Act 1883 (46 & 47 Vict. c. cxxxvi))	
	Brighton Order 1893 Provisional Order for altering the Brighton Improvement Act, 1884. (Note: Brighton Improvement Act 1884 (47 & 48 Vict. c. cclxii))	
	Burnley Order 1893 Provisional Order for partially repealing and altering certain Local Acts. (Note: Burnley Borough Improvement Act 1871 (34 & 35 Vict. c. cliv)) (Note: Burnley Borough Improvement Act 1883 (46 & 47 Vict. c. lxxvii))	
	Llandudno Order 1893 Provisional Order for partially repealing and altering certain Local Acts. (Note: Llandudno Improvement Act 1854 (17 & 18 Vict. c. cii)) (Note: Llandudno Improvement Act 1876 (39 & 40 Vict. c. ccxli)) (Note: Llandudno Improvement Act 1879 (42 & 43 Vict. c. xviii))	
	Newton-in-Mackerfield Order 1893 Provisional Order for altering the Newton District Improvement Act, 1855, (Note: Newton District Improvement Act 1855 (18 & 19 Vict. c. c)) and a Confirming Act. (Note: Local Government Board's Provisional Orders Confirmation (No. 11) Act 1889 (52 & 53 Vict. c. cxiii))	
	Rhyl Order 1893 Provisional Order for altering the Rhyl Gas Act, 1891. (Note: Rhyl Gas Act 1891 (54 & 55 Vict. c. cii))	
	Smethwick Order 1893 Provisional Order for altering the Smethwick Local Board (Gas) Act, 1876, (Note: Smethwick Local Board (Gas) Act 1876 (39 & 40 Vict. c. clxxi)) and a Confirming Act. (Note: Local Government Board's Provisional Orders Confirmation (No. 3) Act 1882 (45 & 46 Vict. c. lxi))	
Pier and Harbour Orders Confirmation (No. 4) Act 1893	56 & 57 Vict. c. cxviii	29 June 1893
An Act to confirm certain Provisional Orders made by the Board of Trade under the General Pier and Harbour Act, 1861, relating to Buckpool, Findochty, and Portknockie.
	Buckpool Harbour Order 1893 Order for the regulation of the Harbour of Buckpool, in the County of Banff, the appointment of Harbour Commissioners, and the construction of Works, and for other purposes.	
	Findochty Harbour Order 1893 Order for constituting Harbour Commissioners and vesting in them the Harbour of Findochty, in the County of Banff; and for other purposes.	
	Portknockie Harbour Order 1893 Order for constituting Harbour Commissioners and vesting in them the Harbour of Portknockie, in the County of Banff; and for other purposes.	
Local Government Board's Provisional Orders Confirmation (No. 10) Act 1893	56 & 57 Vict. c. cxix	29 June 1893
An Act to confirm certain Provisional Orders of the Local Government Board for forming the Brighouse, Guildford and Godalming, and Luddenden Joint Hospital Districts, the Clayton-le-Moors and Great Harwood Joint Sewerage District, and the Whitchurch Joint Cemetery District.
	Brighouse Joint Hospital Order 1893 Provisional Order for forming a United District under Section 279 of the Public Health Act, 1875.	
	Clayton-le-Moors and Great Harwood Joint Sewerage District Order 1893 Provisional Order for forming a United District under Section 279 of the Public Health Act, 1875.	
	Guildford and Godalming Joint Hospital Order 1893 Provisional Order for forming a United District under Section 279 of the Public Health Act, 1875.	
	Luddenden Joint Hospital Order 1893 Provisional Order for forming a United District under Section 279 of the Public Health Act, 1875.	
	Whitchurch Joint Cemetery Order 1893 Provisional Order for forming a United District under Section 279 of the Public Health Act, 1875.	
Local Government Board's Provisional Orders Confirmation (No. 11) Act 1893	56 & 57 Vict. c. cxx	29 June 1893
An Act to confirm certain Provisional Orders of the Local Government Board relating to the Urban Sanitary Districts of Bury, Chard (two), Chorley (two), Darwen, and Leicester, and to the Port of Liverpool.
	Bury Order 1893 Provisional Order for altering certain Local Acts. (Note: Bury Improvement Act 1872 (35 & 36 Vict. c. cxlvi)) (Note: Bury Improvement Act 1885 (48 & 49 Vict. c. cxlvi)) (Note: Bury Corporation Gas Act 1890 (53 & 54 Vict. c. lxix))	
	Chard Order (1) 1893 Provisional Order for altering the mode of defraying the Expenses of an Urban Sanitary Authority.	
	Chorley Order (1) 1893 Provisional Order for altering certain Local Acts (Note: Chorley Improvement Act 1853 (16 & 17 Vict. c. clxxxi)) (Note: Chorley Improvement Act 1871 (16 & 17 Vict. c. clxxxі)) and a Confirming Act. (Note: Local Government Board's Provisional Orders Confirmation (No. 12) Act 1890 (53 & 54 Vict. c. clxxx))	
	Chorley Order (2) 1893 Provisional Order for altering the Chorley Improvement Act, 1871.	
	Darwen Order 1893 Provisional Order for altering the Darwen Corporation Act, 1887. (Note: Darwen Corporation Act 1887 (50 & 51 Vict. c. clii))	
	Leicester Order 1893 Provisional Order for altering the Leicester Corporation Act, 1884. (Note: Leicester Corporation Act 1884 (47 & 48 Vict. c. xxxii))	
	Liverpool (Port) Order 1893 Provisional Order for partially repealing certain Confirming Acts. (Note: Local Government Board's Provisional Orders Confirmation Act 1874 (No. 4) (37 & 38 Vict. c. clii)) (Note: Local Government Board's Provisional Orders Confirmation (Aberdare, &c.) Act 1875 (38 & 39 Vict. c. clxxv))	
	Chard Order (2) 1893 Provisional Order made in pursuance of Sections 59 and 87 of the Local Government Act, 1888, for altering the Borough of Chard Order, 1892.	
Local Government Board (Ireland) Provisional Order Confirmation (No. 3) Act 1893	56 & 57 Vict. c. cxxi	29 June 1893
An Act to confirm a Provisional Order made by the Local Government Board for Ireland under the Public Health (Ireland) Act, 1878, relating to the Town of Granard.
	Granard Town Provisional Order 1893 The Local Government Board for Ireland. Granard Town. Provisional Order.	
Local Government Board (Ireland) Provisional Order Confirmation (No. 5) Act 1893	56 & 57 Vict. c. cxxii	29 June 1893
An Act to confirm a Provisional Order made by the Local Government Board for Ireland under the Public Health (Ireland) Act, 1878, relating to the Town of Dungiven.
	Dungiven Waterworks Provisional Order 1893 The Local Government Board for Ireland. Dungiven Waterworks. Provisional Order.	
Water Orders Confirmation (No. 1) Act 1893	56 & 57 Vict. c. cxxiii	29 June 1893
An Act to confirm certain Provisional Orders made by the Board of Trade under the Gas and Water Works Facilities Act, 1870, (Note: Gas and Water Works Facilities Act 1870 (33 & 34 Vict. c. 70)) relating to Hoylake and West Kirby Water, Pocklington Water, Poole Water, and South-west Suburban Water.
	Hoylake and West Kirby Water Order 1893 Order empowering the Hoylake and West Kirby Gas and Water Company (Limited) to raise additional Capital for the purposes of their Water Undertaking.	
	Pocklington Water Order 1893 Order empowering the Pocklington Water Company Limited to raise additional Capital and construct additional Waterworks.	
	Poole Water Order 1893 Order empowering the Poole Waterworks Company to raise additional Capital, to construct additional Works, and to extend their limits of Supply.	
	South-west Suburban Water Order 1893 Order empowering the South-west Suburban Water Company to raise additional Capital.	
Local Government Board (Ireland) Provisional Orders Confirmation (No. 4) Act 1893	56 & 57 Vict. c. cxxiv	27 July 1893
An Act to confirm a Provisional Order made by the Local Government Board for Ireland under the Public Health (Ireland) Act, 1878, relating to the Town of Carlow.
	Carlow Waterworks Provisional Order 1893 The Local Government Board for Ireland. Carlow Waterworks. Provisional Order.	
Water Orders Confirmation (No. 2) Act 1893	56 & 57 Vict. c. cxxv	27 July 1893
An Act to confirm certain Provisional Orders made by the Board of Trade under the Gas and Water Works Facilities Act, 1870, relating to Maidenhead Water and Newington Water.
	Maidenhead Water Order 1893 Order empowering the Maidenhead Waterworks Company to raise additional Capital and to extend their Limits of Supply.	
	Newington Water Order 1893 Order empowering the Newington Water Company Limited to raise additional Capital and to construct additional Waterworks.	
Education Department Provisional Orders Confirmation (Chiswick, &c.) Act 1893	56 & 57 Vict. c. cxxvi	27 July 1893
An Act to confirm certain Provisional Orders made by the Education Department under the Elementary Education Act, 1870, (Note: Elementary Education Act 1870 (33 & 34 Vict. c. 75)) to enable the School Boards for Chiswick, Haworth, and West Ham to put in force the Lands Clauses Consolidation Act, 1845, (Note: Lands Clauses Consolidation Act 1845 (8 & 9 Vict. c. 18)) and the Acts amending the same.
	Chiswick (Middlesex) School Board Order 1893 The School Board for Chiswick, County of Middlesex. Provisional Order for putting in force the Lands Clauses Consolidation Act, 1845.	
	Haworth (Yorks.) School Board Order 1893 The School Board for Haworth, County of York. Provisional Order for putting in force the Lands Clauses Consolidation Act, 1845.	
	West Ham (Essex) School Board Order 1893 The School Board for West Ham, County of Essex. Provisional Order for putting in force the Lands Clauses Consolidation Act, 1845.	
Local Government Board's Provisional Orders Confirmation (No. 6) Act 1893	56 & 57 Vict. c. cxxvii	27 July 1893
An Act to confirm certain Provisional Orders of the Local Government Board relating to the Urban Sanitary Districts of Bradford (Yorks), Buckingham (two), Clitheroe, Dewsbury, Hastings, Lancaster, and Mountain Ash, and to the Rural Sanitary Districts of the Hunslet and Ludlow Unions.
	Bradford (Yorks) Order 1893 Provisional Order to enable the Urban Sanitary Authority for the Borough of Bradford (Yorks) to put in force the Compulsory Clauses of the Lands Clauses Acts.	
	Buckingham Order (1) 1893 Provisional Order to enable the Urban Sanitary Authority for the Borough of Buckingham to put in force the Compulsory Clauses of the Lands Clauses Acts.	
	Buckingham Order (2) 1893 Provisional Order for altering the mode of defraying the Expenses of an Urban Sanitary Authority.	
	Clitheroe Order 1893 Provisional Order to enable the Urban Sanitary Authority for the Borough of Clitheroe to put in force the Compulsory Clauses of the Lands Clauses Acts.	
	Dewsbury Order 1893 Provisional Order to enable the Urban Sanitary Authority for the Borough of Dewsbury to put in force the Compulsory Clauses of the Lands Clauses Acts.	
	Hastings Order 1893 Provisional Order to enable the Urban Sanitary Authority for the Borough of Hastings to put in force the Compulsory Clauses of the Lands Clauses Acts.	
	Hunslet Union Order 1893 Provisional Order to enable the Sanitary Authority for the Rural Sanitary District of the Hunslet Union to put in force the Compulsory Clauses of the Lands Clauses Acts.	
	Lancaster Order 1893 Provisional Order to enable the Urban Sanitary Authority for the Borough of Lancaster to put in force the Compulsory Clauses of the Lands Clauses Acts.	
	Ludlow Union Order 1893 Provisional Order to enable the Sanitary Authority for the Rural Sanitary District of the Ludlow Union to put in force the Compulsory Clauses of the Lands Clauses Acts.	
	Mountain Ash Order 1893 Provisional Order to enable the Sanitary Authority for the Urban Sanitary District of Mountain Ash to put in force the Compulsory Clauses of the Lands Clauses Acts.	
Local Government Board's Provisional Orders Confirmation (No. 7) Act 1893	56 & 57 Vict. c. cxxviii	27 July 1893
An Act to confirm certain Provisional Orders of the Local Government Board relating to the Haslingden and Rawtenstall Outfall Sewerage District, the Urban Sanitary Districts of Manchester and Plymouth, the Stourbridge Main Drainage District and the Upper Stour Valley Main Sewerage District.
	Haslingden and Rawtenstall Outfall Sewerage Order 1893 Provisional Order to enable the Haslingden and Rawtenstall Outfall Sewerage Board to put in force the Compulsory Clauses of the Lands Clauses Acts.	
	Manchester Order (1) 1893 Provisional Order to enable the Urban Sanitary Authority for the City of Manchester to put in force the Compulsory Clauses of the Lands Clauses Acts.	
	Plymouth Order 1893 Provisional Order to enable the Urban Sanitary Authority for the Borough of Plymouth to put in force the Compulsory Clauses of the Lands Clauses Acts.	
	Stourbridge Main Drainage Order 1893 Provisional Order to enable the Stourbridge Main Drainage Board to put in force the Compulsory Clauses of the Lands Clauses Acts.	
	Upper Stour Valley Main Sewerage Order 1893 Provisional Order to enable the Upper Stour Valley Main Sewerage Board to put in force the Compulsory Clauses of the Lands Clauses Acts.	
Local Government Board's Provisional Orders Confirmation (No. 8) Act 1893	56 & 57 Vict. c. cxxix	27 July 1893
An Act to confirm certain Provisional Orders of the Local Government Board relating to the Urban Sanitary Districts of Barking Town, Coventry, Devonport, Folkestone, Honley, Linthwaite, Reddish, Slaithwaite, and Tonbridge.
	Barking Town Order 1893 Provisional Order to enable the Sanitary Authority for the Urban Sanitary District of Barking Town to put in force the Compulsory Clauses of the Lands Clauses Acts.	
	Coventry Order 1893 Provisional Order to enable the Urban Sanitary Authority for the City of Coventry to put in force the Compulsory Clauses of the Lands Clauses Acts.	
	Devonport Order 1893 Provisional Order to enable the Urban Sanitary Authority for the Borough of Devonport to put in force the Compulsory Clauses of the Lands Clauses Acts.	
	Folkestone Order 1893 Provisional Order to enable the Sanitary Authority for the Urban Sanitary District of Folkestone to put in force the Compulsory Clauses of the Lands Clauses Acts.	
	Honley Order 1893 Provisional Order to enable the Sanitary Authority for the Urban Sanitary District of Honley to put in force the Compulsory Clauses of the Lands Clauses Acts.	
	Linthwaite Order 1893 Provisional Order to enable the Sanitary Authority for the Urban Sanitary District of Linthwaite to put in force the Compulsory Clauses of the Lands Clauses Acts.	
	Reddish Order 1893 Provisional Order to enable the Sanitary Authority for the Urban Sanitary District of Reddish to put in force the Compulsory Clauses of the Lands Clauses Acts.	
	Slaithwaite Order 1893 Provisional Order to enable the Sanitary Authority for the Urban Sanitary District of Slaithwaite to put in force the Compulsory Clauses of the Lands Clauses Acts.	
	Tonbridge Order 1893 Provisional Order to enable the Sanitary Authority for the Urban Sanitary District of Tonbridge to put in force the Compulsory Clauses of the Lands Clauses Acts.	
Local Government Board's Provisional Orders Confirmation (No. 12) Act 1893	56 & 57 Vict. c. cxxx	27 July 1893
An Act to confirm two Provisional Orders of the Local Government Board relating to the City of Manchester.
	Manchester Order (2) 1893 Provisional Order to enable the Urban Sanitary Authority for the City of Manchester to put in force the Compulsory Clauses of the Lands Clauses Acts.	
	Manchester Order (3) 1893 Provisional Order for partially repealing and altering certain Local Acts (Note: Manchester Good Government and Police Act 1844 (7 & 8 Vict. c. xl)) (Note: Manchester Improvement Act 1844 (7 & 8 Vict. c. xli)) (Note: Manchester Improvement Act 1845 (8 & 9 Vict. c. cxli)) (Note: Manchester Market Act 1846 (9 & 10 Vict. c. ccxix)) (Note: Manchester Corporation Waterworks Act 1847 (10 & 11 Vict. c. cciii)) (Note: Manchester General Improvement Act 1851 (14 & 15 Vict. c. cxix)) (Note: Manchester New Streets Act 1853 (16 & 17 Vict. c. xci)) (Note: Manchester Corporation Waterworks Act 1854 (17 & 18 Vict. c. xxxviii)) (Note: Manchester Corporation Waterworks Act 1860 (23 & 24 Vict. c. xciii)) (Note: Manchester Corporation Waterworks Act 1863 (26 & 27 Vict. c. lxviii)) (Note: Manchester Improvement Act 1865 (28 & 29 Vict. c. xc)) (Note: Manchester Corporation Waterworks Act 1865 (28 & 29 Vict. c. cxlv)) (Note: Manchester Town Hall and Improvement Act 1866 (29 & 30 Vict. c. xxix)) (Note: Manchester Corporation Waterworks and Improvement Act 1867 (30 & 31 Vict. c. xxxvi)) (Note: Manchester Corporation Waterworks and Improvement Act 1869 (32 & 33 Vict. c. cxvii)) (Note: Manchester Improvement Act 1871 (34 & 35 Vict. c. lxv)) (Note: Manchester Corporation Waterworks and Improvement Act 1872 (35 & 36 Vict. c. xxxi)) (Note: Manchester Corporation Waterworks and Improvement Act 1875 (38 & 39 Vict. c. clxi)) (Note: Manchester Corporation Waterworks Act 1879 (42 & 43 Vict. c. xxxvi)) (Note: Manchester Corporation Act 1882 (45 & 46 Vict. c. cciii)) (Note: Manchester Corporation Act 1889 (52 & 53 Vict. c. xl)) (Note: Manchester Corporation Act 1891 (54 & 55 Vict. c. ccvii)) and Confirming Acts. (Note: Local Government Board's Provisional Orders Confirmation (Abingdon, &c.) Act 1880 (43 & 44 Vict. c. xxxvi)) (Note: Local Government Board's Provisional Orders Confirmation (Halifax, &c.) Act 1881 (44 & 45 Vict. c. lxvi)) (Note: Local Government Board's Provisional Orders Confirmation (No. 8) Act 1884 (47 & 48 Vict. c. ccxv)) (Note: Local Government Board's Provisional Orders Confirmation (No. 7) Act 1885 (48 & 49 Vict. c. cvii)) (Note: Local Government Board's Provisional Orders Confirmation (No. 11) Act 1886 (50 Vict. c. xvii))	
Local Government Board's Provisional Orders Confirmation (No. 14) Act 1893	56 & 57 Vict. c. cxxxi	27 July 1893
An Act to confirm certain Provisional Orders of the Local Government Board relating to the Isle of Thanet (Urban) Joint Hospital District, and the Keighley and Bingley Joint Hospital District.
	Isle of Thanet (Urban) Joint Hospital Order 1893 Provisional Order for forming a United District under Section 279 of the Public Health Act, 1875.	
	Keighley and Bingley Joint Hospital Order 1893 Provisional Order for forming a United District under Section 279 of the Public Health Act, 1875.	
Local Government Board's Provisional Orders Confirmation (No. 16) Act 1893	56 & 57 Vict. c. cxxxii	27 July 1893
An Act to confirm certain Provisional Orders of the Local Government Board relating to the Counties of Hereford, Monmouth, and Worcester, to the Cities of Chichester and York, and to the Rivers of the West Riding of Yorkshire.
	Chichester Order 1893 Provisionai Order made in pursuunce of Sections 54 and 59 of the Local Government Act, 1888.	
	Hereford and Monmouth Order 1893 Provisional Order made in pursuance of Section 54 of the Local Government Act, 1888.	
	Hereford and Worcester Order 1893 Provisional Order made in pursuance of Section 54 of the Local Government Act, 1888.	
	West Yorkshire (Rivers) Order 1893 Provisional Order for constituting a Joint Committee under Section 14 of the Local Government Act, 1888.	
	York Order 1893 Provisional Order made in pursuance of Sections 54 and 59 of the Local Government Act, 1888.	
Local Government Board Provisional Order Confirmation (No. 17) Act 1893 (repealed)	56 & 57 Vict. c. cxxxiii	27 July 1893
An Act to confirm a Provisional Order of the Local Government Board relating to the Contributory Place of Shevington. (Repealed by Liverpool Corporation Act 1921 (11 & 12 Geo. 5. c. lxxiv))
	Shevington Order 1893 Provisional Order for altering the Liverpool Waterworks and Improvement Act, 1887. (Note: Liverpool Waterworks and Improvement Act 1887 (50 & 51 Vict. c. clxvii))	
Local Government Board (Ireland) Provisional Order Confirmation (No. 6) Act 1893	56 & 57 Vict. c. cxxxiv	27 July 1893
An Act to confirm a Provisional Order made by the Local Government Board for Ireland under the Public Health (Ireland) Act, 1878, relating to the Union of Fermoy.
	Kilcrumper Burial Ground Provisional Order 1893 The Local Government Board for Ireland. Kilcrumper Burial Ground. Provisional Order.	
Local Government Board (Ireland) Provisional Order Confirmation (No. 7) Act 1893	56 & 57 Vict. c. cxxxv	27 July 1893
An Act to confirm a Provisional Order made by the Local Government Board for Ireland under the Public Health (Ireland) Act, 1878, relating to the Town of Youghal.
	Youghal Waterworks Provisional Order 1893 The Local Government Board for Ireland. Youghal Waterworks. Provisional Order.	
Local Government Board (Ireland) Provisional Order Confirmation (No. 8) Act 1893	56 & 57 Vict. c. cxxxvi	27 July 1893
An Act to confirm a Provisional Order made by the Local Government Board for Ireland under the Public Health (Ireland) Act, 1878, relating to the Town of Bangor.
	Bangor Joint Burial Board Provisional Order 1893 The Local Government Board for Ireland. Bangor Joint Burial Board. Provisional Order.	
Local Government Board (Ireland) Provisional Order Confirmation (No. 9) Act 1893	56 & 57 Vict. c. cxxxvii	27 July 1893
An Act to confirm a Provisional Order made by the Local Government Board for Ireland under the Public Health (Ireland) Act, 1878, relating to the Town of Lisburn.
	Lisburn (Waterworks and Markets) Provisional Order 1893 The Local Government Board for Ireland. Lisburn Waterworks and Markets. Provisional Order.	
Local Government Board's Provisional Order Confirmation (Housing of Working Classes) (No. 2) Act 1893	56 & 57 Vict. c. cxxxviii	27 July 1893
An Act to confirm a Provisional Order of the Local Government Board under the Housing of the Working Classes Act, 1890, relating to the Urban Sanitary District of Stretford.
	Stretford Order 1893 Provisional Order for confirming an Improvement Scheme under Part I. of the Housing of the Working Classes Act, 1890.	
Pier and Harbour Orders Confirmation (No. 3) Act 1893	56 & 57 Vict. c. cxxxix	27 July 1893
An Act to confirm certain Provisional Orders made by the Board of Trade under the General Pier and Harbour Act, 1861, relating to Bognor, Fowey and Sheerness.
	Bognor Pier Order 1893 Order for transferring the Pier Undertaking of the Bognor Local Board to Mr. Frank Kirk and for the construction of additions to and for the maintenance and regulation of the Pier and Works at Bognor in the County of Sussex.	
	Fowey Harbour Order 1893 Order for the management and improvement of the Harbour of Fowey in the County of Cornwall.	
	Sheerness Pier Order 1893 Order for vesting the Undertaking of the Commissioners of Sheerness Pier in the Sheerness Local Board of Health, and for other purposes.	
Water Order Confirmation (No. 3) Act 1893 (repealed)	56 & 57 Vict. c. cxl	27 July 1893
An Act to confirm a Provisional Order made by the Board of Trade under the Gas and Water Works Facilities Act, 1870, relating to Llandrindod Wells Water. (Repealed by Llandrindod Wells Water Act 1901 (1 Edw. 7. c. xcvi))
	Llandrindod Wells Water Order 1893 Order empowering the Llandrindod Wells Water Company to raise additional capital.	
Electric Lighting Order Confirmation (No. 5) Act 1893	56 & 57 Vict. c. cxli	27 July 1893
An Act to confirm a Provisional Order made by the Board of Trade under the Electric Lighting Acts, 1882 and 1888, relating to Reading.
	Reading Electric Supply Order 1893 Provisional Order granted by the Board of Trade under the Electric Lighting Acts 1882 and 1888 to the Reading Electric Supply Company Limited in respect of the borough of Reading.	
Electric Lighting Order Confirmation (No. 6) Act 1893	56 & 57 Vict. c. cxlii	27 July 1893
An Act to confirm a Provisional Order made by the Board of Trade under the Electric Lighting Acts, 1882 and 1888, relating to Islington.
	Islington Electric Lighting Order 1893 Provisional Order granted by the Board of Trade under the Electric Lighting Acts 1882 and 1888 to the Vestry of Saint Mary Islington in the Administrative County of London in respect of the Parish of Saint Mary Islington.	
Electric Lighting Order Confirmation (No. 7) Act 1893	56 & 57 Vict. c. cxliii	27 July 1893
An Act to confirm a Provisional Order made by the Board of Trade under the Electric Lighting Acts, 1882 and 1888, relating to Newmarket.
	Newmarket Electric Lighting Order 1893 Provisional Order granted by the Board of Trade under the Electric Lighting Acts 1882 and 1888 to the British Electric Light Company Limited in respect of the Urban Sanitary District of Newmarket.	
Gas Orders Confirmation Act 1893	56 & 57 Vict. c. cxliv	27 July 1893
An Act to confirm certain Provisional Orders made by the Board of Trade under the Gas and Water Works Facilities Act, 1870, relating to Bromyard Gas, Llanfairfechan and Aber Gas, Otley Gas, and Swindon Gas.
	Bromyard Gas Order 1893 Order empowering the Bromyard Gas Light and Power Company Limited to maintain and continue Gasworks and to manufacture and supply Gas within the town and parish of Bromyard and the townships or parishes of Linton and Winslow all in the county of Hereford.	
	Llanfairfechan and Aber Gas Order 1893 Order authorising the maintenance and continuance of Gasworks and the manufacture and supply of Gas in the parishes of Llanfairfechan and Aber both in the county of Carnarvon.	
	Otley Gas Order 1893 Order empowering the Otley Gas Company to purchase additional lands and to supply Gas in bulk.	
	Swindon Gas Order 1893 Order empowering the Swindon Gas and Coke Company Limited to maintain and continue Gasworks and to manufacture and supply Gas in part of the parish of Swindon in the county of Wilts.	
Gas Orders Confirmation (No. 2) Act 1893	56 & 57 Vict. c. cxlv	27 July 1893
An Act to confirm certain Provisional Orders made by the Board of Trade under the Gas and Water Works Facilities Act, 1870, relating to Newent Gas, Portishead Gas, Sheffield Gas, and Sligo Gas.
	Newent Gas Order 1893 Order empowering the Newent Gas Company Limited to maintain and continue Gasworks and to manufacture and supply Gas in the Parish of Newent in the County of Gloucester.	
	Portishead Gas Order 1893 Order empowering the Portishead Gas Company Limited to maintain and continue Gasworks and to manufacture and supply Gas in the parishes of Portishead Portbury Easton in Gordano or Saint George and Weston in Gordano all in the county of Somerset.	
	Sheffield Gas Order 1893 Order empowering the Sheffield United Gas Light Company to create and issue debenture stock and to construct additional works.	
	Sligo Gas Order 1893 Order empowering the Gas Light Company of Sligo to raise additional capital to extend their limits of supply and for other purposes.	
Metropolitan Police Provisional Order Confirmation Act 1893 (repealed)	56 & 57 Vict. c. cxlvi	27 July 1893
An Act to confirm a Provisional Order made by one of Her Majesty's Principal Secretaries of State under the Metropolitan Police Act, 1886, (Note: Metropolitan Police Act 1886 (49 & 50 Vict. c. 22)) relating to land in the Parish of St. Giles-in-the-Fields. (Repealed by Statute Law (Repeals) Act 2008 (c. 12))
	Order made by the Secretary of State under the Metropolitan Police Act, 1886.	
North Cornwall Railway Act 1893 (repealed)	56 & 57 Vict. c. cxlvii	27 July 1893
An Act for constituting a portion of the Railways authorised by the North Cornwall Railway Act 1882 (Note: North Cornwall Railway Act 1882 (45 & 46 Vict. c. ccliv)) a separate undertaking and for other purposes. (Repealed by South Western Railway Act 1913 (3 & 4 Geo. 5. c. lxxxviii))
Aire and Calder Navigation Act 1893	56 & 57 Vict. c. cxlviii	27 July 1893
An Act to amend the Acts relating to the Barnsley Canal of the Undertakers of the Navigation of the Rivers of Aire and Calder in the West Riding of the County of York in respect to minerals under or near that Canal and other matters to authorise the Undertakers to close the upper portion of such Canal to extend the time for the purchase of lands and to make further provisions in respect of their undertaking and for other purposes.
Birmingham Canal Navigations Act 1893	56 & 57 Vict. c. cxlix	27 July 1893
An Act to confer further Powers on the Company of Proprietors of the Birmingham Canal Navigations to amend the Acts relating thereto and for other purposes.
Brighton, Rottingdean, and Newhaven Direct Railway Act 1893 (repealed)	56 & 57 Vict. c. cl	27 July 1893
An Act to revive and extend the powers for the purchase of lands for and to extend the time for the completion of the Brighton Rottingdean and Newhaven Direct Railway. (Repealed by Brighton, Rottingdean and Newhaven Direct Railway (Abandonment) Act 1894 (57 & 58 Vict. c. cxliv))
Hunslet Railway Act 1893	56 & 57 Vict. c. cli	27 July 1893
An Act for making a Railway from the West Yorkshire Railway of the Great Northern Railway Company at Beeston to Leeds and Hunslet with a Bridge over the River Aire between Leeds and Hunslet and for other purposes.
Bodmin Water Act 1893	56 & 57 Vict. c. clii	27 July 1893
An Act to extend the limits of supply of the Bodmin Waterworks Company to enable them to construct additional works and to raise further capital and for other purposes.
Chipstead Valley Railway Act 1893	56 & 57 Vict. c. cliii	27 July 1893
An Act for incorporating the Chipstead Valley Railway Company and authorising the construction of Railways from Walton-on-the-Hill (Surrey) to Purley and for other purposes.
Edinburgh Improvement and Municipal and Police (Amendment) Act 1893 (repealed)	56 & 57 Vict. c. cliv	27 July 1893
An Act to authorise the Lord Provost Magistrates and Council of the City of Edinburgh to widen alter and improve existing streets places and districts within the said City to make provision for the appointment of Town Clerk and to regulate that office to amend Acts and for other purposes. (Repealed by Edinburgh Corporation Order Confirmation Act 1933 (24 & 25 Geo. 5. c. v))
Brighton Marine Palace and Pier Act 1893	56 & 57 Vict. c. clv	27 July 1893
An Act to extend the period limited for the construction and completion of the Brighton Marine Palace and Pier and for other purposes.
Runcorn Commissioners Act 1893	56 & 57 Vict. c. clvi	27 July 1893
An Act to authorise the Runcorn Improvement Commissioners to acquire the undertaking of the Runcorn Weston and Halton Waterworks Company and to confer further powers on the Commissioners.
Barnoldswick Local Board Gas Act 1893	56 & 57 Vict. c. clvii	27 July 1893
An Act to authorise the Transfer of the Undertaking of the Barnoldswick Gas and Light Company Limited to the Barnoldswick Local Board and for other purposes.
Brighton and Rottingdean Seashore Electric Tramroad Act 1893	56 & 57 Vict. c. clviii	27 July 1893
An Act for making a Tramroad along the Seashore from Brighton to Rottingdean in the County of Sussex and a Jetty or Landing Stage at Rottingdean and for other purposes.
Brechin and Edzell District Railway Act 1893	56 & 57 Vict. c. clix	27 July 1893
An Act to authorise the Brechin and Edzell District Railway Company to make substituted railways to abandon portions of their authorised railway to extend the time for purchase of lands and completion of works to raise additional capital and for other purposes.
Donegal Railway Act 1893	56 & 57 Vict. c. clx	27 July 1893
An Act to authorise the Donegal Railway Company to extend their Railway to Strabane to alter the gauge of a portion of their railway and for other purposes.
Cheshire Lines Act 1893	56 & 57 Vict. c. clxi	27 July 1893
An Act for conferring further powers upon the Cheshire Lines Committee and the Sheffield and Midland Railway Companies Committee and for other purposes.
Mersey Dock (Various Powers) Act 1893	56 & 57 Vict. c. clxii	27 July 1893
An Act to authorise the Mersey Docks and Harbour Board to construct Railways and alter and improve their Dock accommodation and Works and for other purposes.
Lancashire, Derbyshire, and East Coast Railway Act 1893	56 & 57 Vict. c. clxiii	27 July 1893
An Act to authorise the Lancashire Derbyshire and East Coast Railway Company to divert portions of their authorised railways and make other works in the county of Derby and for other purposes.
Waterford and Limerick Railway Act 1893	56 & 57 Vict. c. clxiv	27 July 1893
An Act for amalgamating the Athenry and Ennis Junction Railway Company and the Athenry and Tuam Railway Company with the Waterford and Limerick Railway Company and for other purposes.
London and North Western and Great Western Railways Act 1893	56 & 57 Vict. c. clxv	27 July 1893
An Act for empowering the London and North Western Railway Company and the Great Western Railway Company to widen portions of their existing railways in the county of Chester and for other purposes.
London and North Western Railway Act 1893	56 & 57 Vict. c. clxvi	27 July 1893
An Act for conferring further powers upon the London and North Western Railway Company in relation to their own Undertaking and other Undertakings in which they are interested jointly with other Companies and also for conferring Powers upon the Great Western Railway Company the Shropshire Union Railways and Canal Company the Portpatrick and Wigtownshire Joint Committee the Midland Railway Company and the Ashby and Nuneaton Railway Joint Committee in relation to such other Undertakings and for other purposes.
Latimer Road and Acton Railway Act 1893 (repealed)	56 & 57 Vict. c. clxvii	27 July 1893
An Act to extend the time for the compulsory purchase of Lands for and for the completion of the Latimer Road and Acton Railway. (Repealed by Latimer Road and Acton Railway Act 1900 (63 & 64 Vict. c. xcv))
Crystal Palace District Gas Act 1893 (repealed)	56 & 57 Vict. c. clxviii	27 July 1893
An Act to authorise the Crystal Palace District Gas Company to raise additional Capital and convert their existing Capital and for other purposes. (Repealed by South Suburban Gas Act 1928 (18 & 19 Geo. 5. c. lxxx))
Weaver Navigation Act 1893	56 & 57 Vict. c. clxix	27 July 1893
An Act to enable the Trustees of the River Weaver Navigation to construct two opening bridges across their navigation at or near Northwich in the county of Chester and in connexion therewith to make certain new roads and to divert existing lines of water pipes and gas pipes and to lay down other lines of pipes in substitution for or in addition thereto to apply to those purposes the moneys they are authorised to borrow by former Acts and for other purposes.
Metropolitan Outer Circle Railway (Extension of Time) Act 1893 (repealed)	56 & 57 Vict. c. clxx	27 July 1893
An Act to revive and further extend the time for the compulsory purchase of lands and to further extend the time for the completion of the Metropolitan Outer Circle Railway. (Repealed by Metropolitan Outer Circle Railway (Abandonment) Act 1895 (58 & 59 Vict. c. vi))
Bilston Commissioners (Water) Act 1893	56 & 57 Vict. c. clxxi	27 July 1893
An Act for conferring further powers upon the Bilston Township Commissioners with respect to the construction of waterworks and the supply of water within their district and for other purposes.
Plymouth, Devonport, and South Western Junction Railway Act 1893	56 & 57 Vict. c. clxxii	27 July 1893
An Act to confer further powers on the Plymouth Devonport and South Western Junction Railway Company.
Bexley Heath Railway Act 1893	56 & 57 Vict. c. clxxiii	27 July 1893
An Act to confer further powers on the Bexley Heath Railway Company.
Glasgow, Yoker, and Clydebank Railway Act 1893	56 & 57 Vict. c. clxxiv	27 July 1893
An Act to authorise the Glasgow Yoker and Clydebank Railway Company to extend their Railway to Dalmuir and to double their existing main line and for other purposes.
North British Railway Act 1893	56 & 57 Vict. c. clxxv	27 July 1893
An Act to empower the North British Railway Company to construct a Junction Railway between their Edinburgh and Glasgow and Monkland and Kirkintilloch Railways to construct new roads and stop up and discontinue level crossings to substitute open cutting for tunnel over portion of their Charing Cross Station at Glasgow to acquire additional lands and for other purposes.
Retford, Rotherham, and Barnsley Railway Act 1893	56 & 57 Vict. c. clxxvi	27 July 1893
An Act to authorise the Sutton Rotherham and Barnsley Railway Company to construct new railways in the West Riding of the County of York to abandon certain of their authorised railways and for other purposes.
Aberdeen University (Buildings Extension) Act 1893	56 & 57 Vict. c. clxxvii	27 July 1893
An Act to authorise the extension of the Buildings of the Marischal College of the University of Aberdeen to provide for the removal and re-erection of Greyfriars Church and other purposes.
Belfast Water Act 1893	56 & 57 Vict. c. clxxviii	27 July 1893
An Act for providing an additional supply of water to the City of Belfast and the suburban districts adjacent thereto to confer further powers on the Belfast City and District Water Commissioners and for other purposes.
Caledonian Railway Act 1893	56 & 57 Vict. c. clxxix	27 July 1893
An Act for enabling the Caledonian Railway Company to widen the Dalmarnock Branch Railway across the River Clyde to acquire lands in Glasgow and to abandon the Mid-Calder Branch Railway for amalgamating the Greenock and Wemyss Bay Railway Company with the Caledonian Railway Company for extending and reviving the time for the purchase of lands for and for the completion of certain rail ways and works for sanctioning the Earnock Branch Railway for stopping up the Forth and Cart Junction Canal for extending the time for the sale of superfluous lands of the Caledonian and Solway Junction Railway Companies for enabling the Caledonian Railway Company to raise additional money and for conferring further powers on them with respect to their undertaking and for other purposes.
Greenock Corporation Act 1893	56 & 57 Vict. c. clxxx	27 July 1893
An Act to confer further Powers on the Corporation Board of Police and Water Trust of Greenock and for various other purposes.
Liverpool Corporation Act 1893 (repealed)	56 & 57 Vict. c. clxxxi	27 July 1893
An Act to amend the existing provisions as to and make further provisions for the discharge of the Corporate Debt of the City of Liverpool and for the borrowing and repayment of Capital in future to consolidate rates and to abolish district rating in the City and to confer powers on the Corporation of the City and make new provisions with respect to the Northern Hospital and the Derby Museum and with respect to the Superannuation of Officers of the Corporation and with respect to Waterworks Buildings Streets Sewers Hoards Sky Signs and other matters. (Repealed by County of Merseyside Act 1980 (c. x))
Wigan Corporation Act 1893	56 & 57 Vict. c. clxxxii	27 July 1893
An Act to empower the Mayor Aldermen and Burgesses of the Borough of Wigan to construct additional Tramways and to make better provision in relation to the health local government and improvement of the borough and for other purposes.
Accrington Gas and Waterworks Act 1893 (repealed)	56 & 57 Vict. c. clxxxiii	27 July 1893
An Act for empowering the Accrington Gas and Waterworks Company to raise additional Capital and for other purposes. (Repealed by County of Lancashire Act 1984 (c. xxi))
Bristol Dock Act 1893	56 & 57 Vict. c. clxxxiv	27 July 1893
An Act to enable the Mayor Aldermen and Burgesses of the City of Bristol to make certain Street Improvements and for other purposes connected with their Dock Undertaking.
Frimley and Farnborough District Water Act 1893	56 & 57 Vict. c. clxxxv	27 July 1893
An Act for incorporating the Frimley and Farnborough District Water Company and empowering them to construct Works and supply Water and for other purposes.
Portsea Island Building Society (Arbitration) Act 1893	56 & 57 Vict. c. clxxxvi	27 July 1893
An Act to effect a settlement of the affairs of the Portsea Island Building Society.
Waterloo and City Railway Act 1893	56 & 57 Vict. c. clxxxvii	27 July 1893
An Act for incorporating the Waterloo and City Railway Company and for empowering them to construct an Underground Railway from near Waterloo Station to Mansion House Street City and for other purpose.
County of the City of Glasgow Act 1893	56 & 57 Vict. c. clxxxviii	24 August 1893
An Act to provide for the Constitution of the City and Royal Burgh of Glasgow as a County of a City, and for other purposes connected therewith.
Local Government Board's Provisional Orders Confirmation (No. 15) Act 1893	56 & 57 Vict. c. clxxxix	24 August 1893
An Act to confirm certain Provisional Orders of the Local Government Board relating to the Urban Sanitary Districts of Abergavenny, Bolton, Kingston-upon-Hull, Wolverhampton, and Worthing.
	Abergavenny Order 1893 Provisional Order for altering certain Local Acts (Note: Abergavenny Improvement Act 1854 (17 & 18 Vict. c. xlix)) (Note: Abergavenny Improvement Act 1860 (23 & 24 Vict. c. cxxxvii)) (Note: Abergavenny Improvement Act 1871 (34 & 35 Vict. c. xcii)) and a Confirming Act. (Note: Local Government Board's Provisional Orders Confirmation (Abergavenny, &c.) Act 1880 (43 & 44 Vict. c. lviii))	
	Bolton Order 1893 Provisional Order for partially repealing and altering certain Local Acts. (Note: Bolton Improvement Act 1854 (17 & 18 Vict. c. clix)) (Note: Bolton Corporation Act 1872 (35 & 36 Vict. c. lxxviii)) (Note: Bolton Improvement Act 1877 (40 & 41 Vict. c. clxxxviii)) (Note: Bolton Improvement Act 1882 (45 & 46 Vict. c. ccxliv))	
	Kingston-upon-Hull Order 1893 Provisional Order for partially repealing and altering a Local Act (Note: Kingston-upon-Hull Improvement Act 1854 (17 & 18 Vict. c. ci)) and certain Confirming Acts. (Note: Local Government Board's Provisional Orders Confirmation (Belper Union, &c.) Act 1877 (40 & 41 Vict. c.cxxxіi)) (Note: Local Government Board's Provisional Orders Confirmation (No. 10) Act 1886 (50 Vict. c. xvi))	
	Wolverhampton Order 1893 Provisional Order for partially repealing and altering certain Local Acts (Note: Wolverhampton Improvement Act 1869 (32 & 33 Vict. c. cxxxi)) (Note: Wolverhampton Corporation Loans Act 1882 (45 & 46 Vict. c. ccxl)) (Note: Wolverhampton Corporation Act 1887 (50 & 51 Vict. c. clxxiv)) (Note: Wolverhampton Corporation Act 1891 (54 & 55 Vict. c. cxcv)) and a Confirming Act. (Note: Local Government Board's Provisional Order Confirmation (No. 13) Act 1888 (51 & 52 Vict. c. clxvii))	
	Worthing Order 1893 Provisional Order for partially repealing and altering certain Local Acts (Note: Worthing Improvement Act 1821 (1 & 2 Geo. 4. c. lix)) (Note: West Worthing Improvement Act 1865 (28 & 29 Vict. c. xxvii)) and Confirming Acts. (Note: Local Government Supplemental Act 1869 (32 & 33 Vict. c. cxxiv)) (Note: Local Government Board's Provisional Orders Confirmation (No. 4) Act 1882 (45 & 46 Vict. c. lxii))	
Salmon Fishery Act, 1873, Provisional Order (Tees Fishery District) Confirmation Act 1893	56 & 57 Vict. c. cxc	24 August 1893
An Act to confirm a Provisional Order made by the Board of Trade in pursuance of the Salmon Fishery Act, 1873, (Note: Salmon Fishery Act 1873 (36 & 37 Vict. c. 71)) relating to the Tees Fishery District.
	Tees Fishery District Order 1893 Provisional Order to empower the Board of Conservators of the Fishery District of the River Tees to put in force the provisions of the "Lands Clauses Consolidation Acts" relating to purchase otherwise than by agreement in respect of Dinsdale Dam.	
Education Department Provisional Order Confirmation (London) Act 1893	56 & 57 Vict. c. cxci	24 August 1893
An Act to confirm a Provisional Order made by the Education Department under the Elementary Education Act, 1870, to enable the School Board for London to put in force the Lands Claus's Acts.
	London School Board Order 1893 The School Board for London. Provisional Order for putting in force the Lands Clauses Acts.	
Education Department Provisional Order Confirmation (London) (No. 2) Act 1893	56 & 57 Vict. c. cxcii	24 August 1893
An Act to confirm a Provisional Order made by the Education Department under the Elementary Education Act, 1870, to enable the School Board for London to put in force the Lands Clauses Acts.
	London School Board Order (2) 1893 The School Board for London. County of London. Provisional Order for putting in force the Lands Clauses Acts.	
Tramways Orders Confirmation Act 1893	56 & 57 Vict. c. cxciii	24 August 1893
An Act to confirm certain Provisional Orders made by the Board of Trade under the Tramways Act, 1870, relating to Blackpool Corporation Tramways, Manchester Corporation Tramways, and Plymouth Corporation Tramways.
	Blackpool Corporation Tramways Order 1893 Order authorising the Mayor Aldermen and Burgesses of the Borough of Blackpool to construct additional Tramways in the said Borough.	
	Manchester Corporation Tramways Order 1893 Order authorising the Mayor Aldermen and Citizens of the City of Manchester in the County of Lancaster to construct additional Tramways in the said City.	
	Plymouth Corporation Tramways Order 1893 Order authorising the Mayor Aldermen and. Burgesses of the Borough of Plymouth to construct additional Tramways in the said Borough.	
Aberdeen Corporation (Gas and Water) Act 1893 (repealed)	56 & 57 Vict. c. cxciv	24 August 1893
An Act to confer further powers on the Lord Provost Magistrates and Town Council of the City and Royal Burgh of Aberdeen with reference to their Gas and Water Undertakings to make more effectual provision for the prevention of the pollution of the River Dee and for other purposes. (Repealed by Aberdeen Corporation (Administration Finance &c.) Order Confirmation Act 1940 (3 & 4 Geo. 6. c. iii))
Ashton-under-Lyne Corporation Act 1893	56 & 57 Vict. c. cxcv	24 August 1893
An Act to authorise the construction of new sewers and to make better provision in relation to the health local government and improvement of the borough of Ashton-under-Lyne and for other purposes.
East Fife Central Railway Act 1893	56 & 57 Vict. c. cxcvi	24 August 1893
An Act for incorporating the East Fife Central Railway Company and authorising the Construction of Railways in the county of Fife and for other purposes.
Metropolitan District Railway Act 1893	56 & 57 Vict. c. cxcvii	24 August 1893
An Act to confer further powers on the Metropolitan District Railway Company and for other purposes.
North Eastern Railway (Hull Docks) Act 1893	56 & 57 Vict. c. cxcviii	24 August 1893
An Act for the amalgamation of the Undertaking of the Dock Company at Kingston-upon-Hull with the Undertaking of the North Eastern Railway Company and for other purposes.
Aberlady, Gullane and North Berwick Railway Act 1893	56 & 57 Vict. c. cxcix	24 August 1893
An Act for incorporating the Aberlady Gullane and North Berwick Railway Company and authorising the construction of railways in the county of Haddington and for other purposes.
Gifford and Garvald Railway Act 1893	56 & 57 Vict. c. cc	24 August 1893
An Act to enable the Gifford and Garvald Railway Company to construct a Deviation Railway and for other purposes.
Great North of Scotland Railway (Various Powers) Act 1893	56 & 57 Vict. c. cci	24 August 1893
An Act to authorise the Great North of Scotland Railway Company to extend their Railway to buy Additional Land and for other purposes.
London County Council (Subways) Act 1893	56 & 57 Vict. c. ccii	24 August 1893
An Act to confer further powers on the London County Council with respect to their existing subways.
Towcester and Buckingham Railway (Abandonment) Act 1893 (repealed)	56 & 57 Vict. c. cciii	24 August 1893
An Act for the abandonment of the Towcester and Buckingham Railway and the repayment of the deposit fund. (Repealed by Statute Law (Repeals) Act 2013 (c. 2))
West Ham Corporation Act 1893	56 & 57 Vict. c. cciv	24 August 1893
An Act to confer further powers upon the Corporation of the borough of West Ham and to make further provision for the good government of that borough and for other purposes.
West Hampshire Water Act 1893	56 & 57 Vict. c. ccv	24 August 1893
An Act for incorporating the West Hampshire Water Company and empowering them to construct waterworks and supply water and for other purposes.
Barry Railway Act 1893	56 & 57 Vict. c. ccvi	24 August 1893
An Act to enable the Barry Railway Company to construct a new Dock new Railways a Tramroad and other works and for other purposes.
City and South London Railway Act 1893	56 & 57 Vict. c. ccvii	24 August 1893
An Act to empower the City and South London Railway Company to make an Underground Railway to Islington and to extend the time for the purchase of lands for and for the completion of the Underground Railway authorised by the City and South London Railway Act 1890 (Note: City and South London Railway Act 1890 (53 & 54 Vict. c. cxiv)) and for other purposes.
Glasgow Corporation Act 1893	56 & 57 Vict. c. ccviii	24 August 1893
An Act to authorise the Lord Provost Magistrates and Council of the City of Glasgow to construct additional Tramways and for other purposes.
Harrogate Corporation Act 1893	56 & 57 Vict. c. ccix	24 August 1893
An Act to place the Stray under the control and management of the Corporation of Harrogate and to make better provision in regard to the health local government and improvement of the Borough of Harrogate.
Leeds Improvement Act 1893 (repealed)	56 & 57 Vict. c. ccx	24 August 1893
An Act to make further provision for the Local Government of the City of Leeds to authorise certain Street Improvements and for other purposes. (Repealed by West Yorkshire Act 1980 (c. xiv))
London County Council (Money) Act 1893 (repealed)	56 & 57 Vict. c. ccxi	24 August 1893
An Act to regulate the expenditure of Money by the London County Council on Capital Account during the current Financial Period and the raising of Money to meet such Expenditure. (Repealed by London County Council (Finance Consolidation) Act 1912 (2 & 3 Geo. 5. c. cv))
London, Deptford and Greenwich Tramways Act 1893	56 & 57 Vict. c. ccxii	24 August 1893
An Act to extend the time for the completion of certain authorised Tramways of the London Deptford and Greenwich Tramways Company to authorise the use of mechanical power on the Tramways of the Company and for other purposes.
Brean Down Harbour and Railway Act 1893	56 & 57 Vict. c. ccxiii	24 August 1893
An Act to revive the powers and extend the time for the compulsory purchase of Lands for and to extend the time for the completion of the Pier or Jetty Railway and Works authorised by the Brean Down Harbour and Railway Act 1889. (Note: Brean Down Harbour and Railway Act 1889 (52 & 53 Vict. c. cciv))
Charing Cross, Euston, and Hampstead Railway Act 1893	56 & 57 Vict. c. ccxiv	24 August 1893
An Act for incorporating the Charing Cross Euston and Hampstead Railway Company and for empowering them to construct underground Railways from Charing Cross to Hampstead with a branch to Euston Station and for other purposes.
St. Helens Corporation Act 1893	56 & 57 Vict. c. ccxv	24 August 1893
An Act to extend the boundaries of the borough of Saint Helens in the county of Lancaster to consolidate the townships within the borough to dissolve the Burial Board and to make better provision for the health local government and improvement of the borough and for other purposes.
Blackpool, St. Anne's and Lytham Tramways Act 1893 (repealed)	56 & 57 Vict. c. ccxvi	24 August 1893
An Act for incorporating and conferring powers on the Blackpool Saint Anne's and Lytham Tramways Company and for other purposes. (Repealed by Lytham St. Anne's Corporation Act 1923 (13 & 14 Geo. 5. c. lxxxvi))
Fleetwood Improvement Act 1893	56 & 57 Vict. c. ccxvii	24 August 1893
An Act for authorising the Fleetwood Improvement Commissioners to establish maintain work and regulate a Ferry across the River Wyre between Fleetwood and Knot End and for making further and better provision for the Improvement Health and good Government of the Urban Sanitary District of Fleetwood and for other purposes.
Garve and Ullapool Railway (Abandonment) Act 1893	56 & 57 Vict. c. ccxviii	24 August 1893
An Act to provide for the abandonment of the under taking authorised by the Garve and Ullapool Railway Act 1890. (Note: Garve and Ullapool Railway Act 1890 (53 & 54 Vict. c. ccxxxiii))
South Leeds Junction Railway Act 1893	56 & 57 Vict. c. ccxix	24 August 1893
An Act for incorporating the South Leeds Junction Railway Company and for other purposes.
Dublin Southern District Tramways Act 1893	56 & 57 Vict. c. ccxx	24 August 1893
An Act to authorise the use of mechanical power upon the undertaking of the Dublin Southern District Tramways Company to enable that company to acquire the undertaking of the Blackrock and Kingstown Tramways Company and for other purposes.
London County Council (General Powers) Act 1893	56 & 57 Vict. c. ccxxi	24 August 1893
An Act to provide for the representation of certain County Councils on the Thames Conservancy Board to empower the Council to prohibit or regulate the erection of dwelling-houses on low lands subject to floods to confer powers on the Council with respect to their procedure investigations on various subjects prevention of epidemic diseases the requiring of returns the re-arrangement of wards compensation to workmen, and electric lighting to provide against the giving of false alarms of fire to extend and explain the powers of the Council with respect to sky signs and with respect to bands and to confer certain powers on Vestries and District Boards.
Derry City and County Railway Act 1893	56 & 57 Vict. c. ccxxii	24 August 1893
An Act to confer Further Powers on the Derry City and County Railway Company and for other purposes.
Cleveland Extension Mineral Railway Act 1893	56 & 57 Vict. c. ccxxiii	12 September 1893
An Act to revive and extend the powers of the Cleveland Extension Mineral Railway Company.
Blackrock and Kingstown Drainage and Improvement Act 1893	56 & 57 Vict. c. ccxxiv	12 September 1893
An Act to constitute a Joint Drainage Board for the township of Blackrock and the township of Kingstown in the county of Dublin to confer powers on such Board for the construction of sewers and other purposes to confer additional powers on the Blackrock and Kingstown Township Commissioners and for other purposes.
Canal Rates, Tolls and Charges (Leeds and Liverpool Canal) Order Confirmation Act 1893	56 & 57 Vict. c. ccxxv	12 September 1893
An Act to confirm a Provisional Order made by the Board of Trade under the Railway and Canal Traffic Act, 1888, containing the Classification of Merchandise Traffic, and the Schedule of Maximum Rates, Tolls, and Charges applicable thereto, of the Leeds and Liverpool Canal Company.
	Canal Rates, Tolls and Charges (Leeds and Liverpool Canal) Order 1893 Order of the Board of Trade under the Railway and Canal Traffic Act, 1888, embodying the Classification of Merchandise Traffic and the authorised Schedule of Maximum Rates, Tolls, and Charges, including all Terminal and Wharfage Charges applicable to the said Classification of the Leeds and Liverpool Canal Company.	
Canal Rates, Tolls and Charges (Navigation of the Rivers Aire and Calder) Order Confirmation Act 1893	56 & 57 Vict. c. ccxxvi	12 September 1893
An Act to confirm a Provisional Order made by the Board of Trade under the Railway and Canal Traffic Act, 1888, containing the Classification of Merchandise Traffic, and the Schedule of Maximum Rates, Tolls, and Charges applicable thereto, of the Undertakers of the Navigation of the Rivers Aire and Calder.
	Canal Rates, Tolls and Charges (Navigation of the Rivers Aire and Calder) Order 1893 Order of the Board of Trade under the Railway and Canal Traffic Act, 1888, embodying the Classification of Merchandise Traffic and the authorised Schedule of Maximum Rates, Tolls, and Charges, including all Terminal and Wharfage Charges applicable to the said Classification of the Undertakers of the Navigation of the Rivers Aire and Calder.	
Canal Tolls and Charges (Grand Junction Canal) Order Confirmation Act 1893	56 & 57 Vict. c. ccxxvii	12 September 1893
An Act to confirm a Provisional Order made by the Board of Trade under the Railway and Canal Traffic Act, 1888, containing the Classification of Merchandise Traffic, and the Schedule of Maximum Tolls and Charges applicable thereto, of the Company of Proprietors of the Grand Junction Canal.
	Canal Tolls and Charges (Grand Junction Canal) Order 1893 Order of the Board of Trade under the Railway and Canal Traffic Act, 1888, embodying the Classification of Merchandise Traffic and the authorised Schedule of Maximum Tolls and Charges, including all Wharfage Charges applicable to the said Classification of the Company of Proprietors of the Grand Junction Canal.	
Canal Tolls and Charges (Warwick and Birmingham Canal) Order Confirmation Act 1893	56 & 57 Vict. c. ccxxviii	12 September 1893
An Act to confirm a Provisional Order made by the Board of Trade under the Railway and Canal Traffic Act, 1888, containing the Classification of Merchandise Traffic, and the Schedule of Maximum Tolls and Charges applicable thereto, of the Warwick and Birmingham Canal Company.
	Canal Tolls and Charges (Warwick and Birmingham Canal) Order 1893 Order of the Board of Trade under the Railway and Canal Traffic Act, 1888, embodying the Classification of Merchandise Traffic and the authorised Schedule of Maximum Tolls and Charges, including all Wharfage Charges applicable to the said Classification of the Warwick and Birmingham Canal Company.	
Local Government Board's Provisional Orders Confirmation (No. 13) Act 1893	56 & 57 Vict. c. ccxxix	12 September 1893
An Act to confirm certain Provisional Orders of the Local Government Board relating to the Urban Sanitary Districts of Carshalton, Festiniog, Macclesfield, Northampton, Ossett, and Richmond (Surrey), and to the Rural Sanitary District of the Wakefield Union.
	Carshalton Order 1893 Provisional Order to enable the Sanitary Authority for the Urban Sanitary District of Carshalton to put in force the Compulsory Clauses of the Lands Clauses Acts.	
	Festiniog Order 1893 Provisional Order to enable the Sanitary Authority for the Urban Sanitary District of Festiniog to put in force the Compulsory Clauses of the Lands Clauses Acts.	
	Macclesfield Order 1893 Provisional Order to enable the Urban Sanitary Authority for the Borough of Macclesfield to put in force the Compulsory Clauses of the Lands Clauses Acts.	
	Northampton Order 1893 Provisional Order to enable the Urban Sanitary Authority for the Borough of Northampton to put in force the Compulsory Clauses of the Lands Clauses Acts.	
	Ossett Order 1893 Provisional Order to enable the Urban Sanitary Authority for the Borough of Ossett to put in force the Compulsory Clauses of the Lands Clauses Acts.	
	Richmond (Surrey) Order 1893 Provisional Order to enable the Urban Sanitary Authority for the Borough of Richmond (Surrey) to put in force the Compulsory Clauses of the Lands Clauses Acts.	
	Wakefield Union Order 1893 Provisional Order to enable the Sanitary Authority for the Rural Sanitary District of the Wakefield Union to put in force the Compulsory Clauses of the Lands Clauses Acts.	

=== Private and personal acts ===
Short title	Citation	Royal assent
Long title
Ryland's Estate Act 1893	56 & 57 Vict. c. 1 Pr.	9 June 1893
An Act to authorise the payment under certain conditions of a Legacy bequeathed by Louisa Anne Ryland to the General Hospital Birmingham.
Fleming's Divorce Act 1893 (Note: This act was not printed by the Queen's Printer.)	56 & 57 Vict. c. 2	27 July 1893
An Act to dissolve the Marriage of Delamere Peter Fleming, of Kingstown in the County of Dublin, Master Mariner, with Catherine Fleming, his now Wife, and to enable him to marry again, and for other purposes.

=== Sources ===
- The Law Reports: The public general statutes. Vol. 29. Council of Law Reporting. 1894 – via Google Books.

== See also ==
- List of acts of the Parliament of the United Kingdom
