= Colchester power station =

Former coal-fired power station in England

- Country: England
- Location: Colchester
- Coordinates: 51°52′59″N 00°55′35″E
- Status: Decommissioned
- Construction began: 1896
- Commission date: 1900; 125 years ago
- Decommission date: 1960; 65 years ago
- Owners: Colchester Corporation (1894–1948); British Electricity Authority (1948–1955); Central Electricity Authority (1955–1957); Central Electricity Generating Board (1958–1970)
- Operator: As owner

Thermal power station
- Primary fuel: Coal
- Turbine technology: Steam turbines
- Cooling source: River water and cooling ponds

Power generation
- Units operational: 2 x 1.25 MW, 1 x 3.75 MW
- Nameplate capacity: 7.5 MW
- Annual net output: 9,499 MWh (1946)

Colchester power station supplied electricity to the city of Colchester, Essex, England and the surrounding area from 1900 to 1960. It was owned and operated by Colchester Corporation prior to the nationalisation of the electricity supply industry in 1948. The power station was redeveloped several times incorporating new plant.

== History ==
In 1893 Colchester Corporation applied for a provisional order under the Electric Lighting Acts to generate and supply electricity to the then town. The Colchester Electric Lighting Order 1893 was granted by the Board of Trade and was confirmed by Parliament through the Electric Lighting Orders Confirmation (No. 2) Act 1893 (56 & 57 Vict. c. xxxv). The power station was built on Hythe Quay and first supplied electricity in 1900.

== Equipment specification ==
By 1923 the generating plant comprised:

- Coal-fired boilers generating up to 48,000 lb/h (6.05 kg/s) of steam, these supplied steam to:
- Generators
  - 1 × 150 kW reciprocating engine driving a generator
  - 1 × 250 kW reciprocating engine driving a generator
  - 1 × 350 kW reciprocating engine driving a generator
  - 1 × 375 kW reciprocating engine driving a generator
  - 1 × 500 kW reciprocating engine driving a generator
  - 1 × 750 kW reciprocating engine driving a generator

These machines had a total generating capacity of 2,375 kW of direct current (DC) power.

Electricity supply was at 420 & 210 Volts DC.

=== New plant 1955 ===
The plant in 1955 comprised:

- Boilers:
  - 4 × Vickers Spearing boilers with chain grate stokers
  - 1 × Babcock boiler with chain grate stoker

The total evaporative capacity was 82,000 lb/h (10.3 kg/s), steam conditions were 250 psi and 650°F (17.2 bar, 343°C), steam was supplied to:

- Turbo-alternators:
  - 3 × Allen’s geared 1.25 MW turbo-alternator
  - 1 × Allen’s geared 3.75 MW turbo-alternator

The total installed generating capacity was 7.5 MW, with an output capacity of 6 MW.

Condenser cooling water was drawn from the River Colne and was cooled in two cooling ponds of 0.45 million gallons per hour (0.57 m^{3}/s).

== Operations ==
=== Operating data 1921–23 ===
The operating data for the period 1921–23 is shown in the table:

Colchester power station operating data 1921–23
Electricity Use	Units	Year		
Electricity Use	Units	1921	1922	1923
Lighting and domestic use	MWh	570	573	582
Public lighting use	MWh	19	20	30
Traction	MWh	448	354	362
Power use	MWh	687	538	610
Total use	MWh	1,728	1,485	1,585
Load and connected load
Maximum load	kW	1,321	1,270	1,316
Total connections	kW	3,213	3,515	3,613
Load factor	Per cent	18.0	17.3	18.5
Financial
Revenue from sales of current	£	–	34,944	35,588
Surplus of revenue over expenses	£	–	8,545	14,074

Under the terms of the Electricity (Supply) Act 1926 (16 & 17 Geo. 5. c. 51) the Central Electricity Board (CEB) was established. The CEB identified high efficiency ‘selected’ power stations that would supply electricity most effectively. The CEB also constructed the national grid (1927–33) to connect power stations within a region.

=== Operating data 1946 ===
Colchester power station operating data in 1946 is given below:

Colchester power station operating data in 1946
Year	Load factor per cent	Max output load MW	Electricity supplied MWh	Thermal efficiency per cent
1946	18.0	6,172	9,499	9.59

The British electricity supply industry was nationalised in 1948 under the provisions of the Electricity Act 1947 (10 & 11 Geo. 6. c. 54). The Colchester electricity undertaking was abolished, ownership of Colchester power station was vested in the British Electricity Authority, and subsequently the Central Electricity Authority and the Central Electricity Generating Board (CEGB). At the same time the electricity distribution and sales responsibilities of the Colchester electricity undertaking were transferred to the Eastern Electricity Board (EEB).

=== Operating data 1954–58 ===
Operating data for the period 1954–8 is shown in the table:

Colchester power station operating data, 1954–8
Year	Running hours	Max output capacity MW	Electricity supplied GWh	Thermal efficiency per cent
1954	390	6	1.201	6.51
1955	645	6	2.269	7.28
1956	610	6	2.215	7.86
1957	437	6	1.468	7.57
1958	663	6	2.536	8.98

Colchester power station was part of the Colchester electricity supply district. This district served an area of 195 square miles and a population of 103,600 (1959). It included Colchester, West Mersea, Wivenhoe, Lexden, Winstree, Maldon, Tendering and Samford. The number of customers and the electricity sold was as follows:

	1956	1957	1958
Total number of consumers	32,776	33,523	34,378
No. of domestic consumers	28,967	29,386	See below
Units sold kWh	110,612	122,866	139,218
Domestic units sold kWh	40,753	44,390	See below

In 1958 the number of units sold to categories of consumers was as follows:

Type of consumer	No. of consumers	Units sold kWh
Domestic	30,169	48,845
Commercial	2,154	19,890
Combined premises	599	2,596
Farms	6,309	6,309
Industrial	517	60,854
Public lighting	15	724
Total	34,378	139,218

There were 735 miles (1183 km) of high voltage mains in the district comprising 281 miles (452 km) of underground mains and 454 miles (731 km) of overhead cables.

== Closure ==
Colchester power station was decommissioned in about 1960.

== See also ==
- Timeline of the UK electricity supply industry
- List of power stations in England
