= Metropolitan Board of Works (Loans) Act 1869 =

Act of the Parliament of the United Kingdom

Metropolitan Board of Works (Loans) Act 1869 (Note: Section 1.)
- Act of Parliament
- Parliament of the United Kingdom
- Long title: An Act for making further provision respecting the borrowing of Money by the Metropolitan Board of Works, and for other purposes connected therewith.
- Citation: 32 & 33 Vict. c. 102
- Introduced by: Acton Smee Ayrton MP (Commons)
- Territorial extent: United Kingdom

Dates
- Royal assent: 11 August 1869
- Commencement: 11 August 1869 (Note: The Acts of Parliament (Commencement) Act 1793.)
- Repealed: 7 August 1912
Other legislation
Amends	See § Repealed enactments
Repeals/revokes	See § Repealed enactments
Repealed by	London County Council (Finance Consolidation) Act 1912

Status: Repealed

History of passage through Parliament

Records of Parliamentary debate relating to the statute from Hansard

Text of statute as originally enacted

The Metropolitan Board of Works (Loans) Act 1869 (32 & 33 Vict. c. 102) was an act of the Parliament of the United Kingdom that consolidated and amended enactments relating to the ability of the Metropolitan Board of Works to borrow money. The act created one consolidated stock charged on all securities raised by the Metropolitan Board of Works and established one fund for doing so.

== Background ==
The Metropolitan Board of Works was authorised by various acts to borrow money, and had incurred debts of £5,000,000 (equivalent to £514,570,139 in 2025) under those acts by 1869.

Reference	Title
Part I - General Improvement Acts
18 & 19 Vict. c. 120.	The Metropolis Management Act, 1855
19 & 20 Vict. c. 112.	The Metropolis Management Amendment Act, 1856
25 & 26 Vict. c. 102.	The Metropolis Management Amendment Act, 1862
20 & 21 Vict. c. cxv.	Covent Garden Approach and Southwark and Westminster Communication Act, 1857
20 & 21 Vict. c. l.	The Finsbury Park Act, 1857
21 & 22 Vict. c. xxxviii.	Victoria Park Approach Act, 1858
27 & 28 Vict. c. iv.	The Southwark Park Act, 1861
28 & 29 Vict. c. iii.	Whitechapel and Holborn Improvement Act, 1865
29 & 30 Vict. c. cl.	Kensington Improvement Act, 1865
31 & 32 Vict. c. vii.	Marylebone (Sligo Lane) Improvement Act, 1868
Part II - Main Drainage Acts
25 & 26 Vict. c. 104.	The Metropolis Management Amendment Act, 1868
26 & 27 Vict. c. 65.	The Metropolitan Main Drainage Extension Act, 1863
28 & 29 Vict. c. 19.	An Act to extend the period for borrowing the sum authorized to be raised under The Metropolitan Act
Part III - Fire Brigade Act
28 & 29 Vict. c. 190.	The Metropolitan Fire Brigade Act, 1865
Part IV - Embankment Acts
25 & 26 Vict. c. 93.	The Thames Embankment Act, 1862
26 & 27 Vict. c. 45.	The Metropolis Improvement Act, 1863
27 & 28 Vict. c. 77.	The Thames Embankment Act, 1864
27 & 28 Vict. c. cxxxv.	Thames Embankment Amendment Act, 1864
27 & 28 Vict. c. ci.	The Thames Embankment and Metropolis Improvement Act, 1864
31 & 32 Vict. c. 43.	The Thames Embankment and Metropolis Improvement (Loans) Act, 1868
31 & 32 Vict. c. cxl.	The Thames Embankment (North and South) Act, 1868
31 & 32 Vict. c. cxxxv.	The Thames Embankment Extension Act, 1868
32 & 33 Vict. c. xxxiv.	The Park Lane Improvement Act, 1869

It was necessary for the Metropolitan Board of Works to borrow a further £10,000,000 (equivalent to £1,029,140,279 in 2025).

== Passage ==
On 23 June 1869, the Committee on Board of Metropolitan Board of Works (Loans) in the House of Commons was appointed. The Committee met and reported on 24 June 1869, resolving to that:

1. That it is expedient to enable the Metropolitan Board of Works to raise a portion of the Loans authorised by the General Improvement Acts, the Main Drainage Acts, the Fire Brigade Act, and the Thames Embankment Acts, by the creation of Consolidated Stock, and to authorise the Commissioners for the Reduction of the National Debt to make Advances on the security of such Stock.
2. That a Stamp Duty be charged on every Certificate of such Stock equal to three times the amount of the Stamp Duty which would be chargeable on a transfer of the Stock specified in the Certificate.
3. That a Stamp Duty of Two Shillings and Sixpence be charged on the transfer of every full sum of One hundred Pounds of such Stock, and for any fractional part over and above that amount.
4. That it is expedient to enable the said Board to raise further Sums for completing the Works authorised by the said acts, subject to the provisions contained in those acts respectively.

The Metropolitan Board of Works (Loans) Bill had its first reading in the House of Commons on 26 June 1869, presented by Acton Smee Ayrton MP. The bill had its second reading in the House of Commons on 20 July 1869 and committed to a select committee, which reported on 23 July 1869, with amendments. The amended bill and was committed to a committee of the whole house, which met on 31 July 1869, and 2 August 1869, and reported on 3 August 1869, with amendments. The amended bill had its third reading in the House of Commons on 4 August 1869 and 5 August 1869, during which a Motion to re-commit the bill to a committee of the whole house was defeated. The amended bill passed, without amendments.

The bill had its first reading in the House of Lords on 6 August 1869. The bill had its second reading in the House of Lords on 7 August 1869 and was committed to a committee of the whole house, which met and reported on 9 August 1869, without amendments. The bill had its third reading in the House of Lords on 10 August 1869 and passed, with amendments.

The amended bill was considered and agreed to by the House of Commons on 10 August 1869.

The bill was granted royal assent on 11 August 1869.

== Provisions ==
=== Repealed enactments ===
Section 50 of the act repealed 21 enactments, listed in the third schedule to the act. Section 50 preserved existing securities, rates and charges and protected all pre-existing rights, actions and proceedings from being affected by the repeal.

Citation	Short title	Title	Extent of repeal
18 & 19 Vict. c. 120	Metropolis Management Act 1855	"An Act for the better Local Management of the Metropolis."	So much of section one hundred and thirty-five of the Metropolis Management Act, 1855, as provides that the sewers and works therein mentioned shall be completed on or before the 31st of December 1860; so much of section one hundred and eighty-three as relates to the mode of borrowing by the Metropolitan Board of Works, and sections one hundred and eighty-four to one hundred and ninety-one, both inclusive, so far as respects the Metropolitan Board of Works.
20 & 21 Vict. c. cxv	Covent Garden Approach and Southwark and Westminster Communication Act 1857	"Covent Garden Approach and Southern and Westminster Communication Act, 1857."	Section forty-five from "and for securing," and sections forty-six to fifty-three, both inclusive, and section fifty-six.
20 & 21 Vict. c. cl	Finsbury Park Act 1857	"The Finsbury Park Act, 1857 "	Section thirty-six from "and for securing " to end of section, and sections thirty-seven to forty-four, both inclusive.
21 & 22 Vict. c. 104	Metropolis Management Amendment Act 1858	"An Act to alter and amend the Metropolis Local Management Act (1855), and to extend the powers of the Metropolitan Board of Works for the Purification of the Thames and the Main Drainage of the Metropolis."	Sections four to seven, and ten to twenty-two, all inclusive, and section twenty-six.
21 & 22 Vict. c. xxxviii	Victoria Park Approach Act 1858	"Victoria Park Approach Act, 1858"	Section thirty-eight from "and for securing " to end of section, and sections thirty-nine to forty-four, both inclusive, and section forty-seven.
25 & 26 Vict. c. 93	Thames Embankment Act 1862	"An Act for embanking the North Side of the River Thames from Westminster Bridge to Blackfriars Bridge, and for making new Streets in and near thereto."	Section thirty-seven, and sections forty-two to forty-six, both inclusive.
25 & 26 Vict. c. 102	Metropolis Management Amendment Act 1862	"An Act to amend the Metropolis Local Management Acts."	Sections nineteen and twenty so far as regards the Metropolitan Board of Works, and section twenty-six.
26 & 27 Vict. c. 45	Metropolis Improvement Act 1863	"An Act for making a new street from Blackfriars to the Mansion House in the City of London in connexion with the Embankment of the River Thames on the northern side of that river, and for other purposes."	So much of section twenty as incorporates section thirty-seven of The Thames Embankment Act, 1862; and sections twenty-two and twenty-three.
26 & 27 Vict. c. 68	Metropolitan Main Drainage Extension Act 1863	"An Act to extend the powers of the Acts relating to the Main Drainage of the Metropolis."	The whole Act.
26 & 27 Vict. c. 75	Thames Embankment Act 1863	"An Act for the embankment of part of the river Thames on the south side thereof, in the parish of Saint Mary, Lambeth, and for other purposes."	So much of section twenty-one as incorporates section thirty-seven of The Thames Embankment Act, 1862; sections twenty-six, twenty-seven, twenty-eight, and twenty-nine.
27 & 28 Vict. c. 61	Thames Embankment and Metropolis Improvement (Loans) Act 1864	"An Act for empowering the Commissioners of the Treasury to guarantee, and the Commissioners for the Reduction of the National Debt to advance, the sums mentioned to be borrowed for the Embankment of the Thames and Improvement of the Metropolis, and for other purposes connected therewith."	The whole Act.
27 & 28 Vict. c. iv	Southwark Park Act 1864	"The Southwark Park Act, 1864"	Section thirty-one from "and for securing" to end of section, and sections thirty-two to thirty-nine, both inclusive.
28 & 29 Vict. c. 19	Metropolitan Main Drainage Extension Act 1865	"An Act to extend the period for borrowing moneys authorized to be raised under The Metropolitan Main Drainage Extension Act, 1863."	The whole Act.
28 & 29 Vict. c. 90	Metropolitan Fire Brigade Act 1865	"An Act for the establishment of a Fire Brigade within the Metropolis."	Sections nineteen, twenty, and twenty-one.
28 & 29 Vict. c. iii	Whitechapel and Holborn Improvement Act 1865	"Whitechapel and Holborn Improvement Acts, 1865."	Section thirty-one from "and for securing" to end of section, and sections thirty-two to thirty-nine, both inclusive, and section forty-two.
29 & 30 Vict. c. cl	Kensington Improvement Act 1866	"Kensington Improvement Act, 1865."	Section thirty from "and for securing" to end of section, and sections thirty-one to thirty-eight, both inclusive, and section forty-one.
31 & 32 Vict. c. 43	Thames Embankment and Metropolis Improvement (Loans) Act 1868	"An Act for extending the provisions of The Thames Embankment and Metropolis Improvement (Loans) Act, 1864, and for amending the powers of the Metropolitan Board of Works in relation to loans under that Act."	The whole Act.
31 & 32 Vict. c. vii	Marylebone (Stingo Lane) Improvement Act 1868	"Marylebone Circus Local Improvement Act, 1868."	Section nineteen from "and for securing" to end of section, and sections twenty to twenty-six, both inclusive, and section twenty-nine.
31 & 32 Vict. c. cxi	Thames Embankment (North and South) Act 1868	"The Thames Embankment (North and South) Act, 1868."	So much of section eighteen as relates to the mode of borrowing, and sections nineteen to twenty-two, both inclusive.
31 & 32 Vict. c. cxxxv	Thames Embankment (Chelsea) Act 1868	"The Thames Embankment (Chelsea) Act, 1868."	So much of section twenty-eight as incorporates section thirty-seven of The Thames Embankment Act, 1862; so much of section twenty-nine as relates to the mode of borrowing, and sections thirty to thirty-two, both inclusive.
32 & 33 Vict. c. cxxxiv	Park Lane Improvement Act 1869	The Park Lane Improvement Act, 1869.	So much of section twenty-five as relates to the mode of borrowing, and sections twenty-six to twenty-eight, both inclusive.

== Subsequent developments ==
Courtenay Ilbert described the act as a Consolidation Act, given that the act, which amended the borrowing powers of the Metropolitan Board of Works, also consolidated various enactments relating to that particular branch of law.

The whole act repealed by the London County Council (Finance Consolidation) Act 1912 (2 & 3 Geo. 5. c. cv), which came into force on 7 August 1912.
