= London County Council (Finance Consolidation) Act 1912 =

Act of the Parliament of the United Kingdom

London County Council (Finance Consolidation) Act 1912 (Note: Section 1.)
- Act of Parliament
- Parliament of the United Kingdom
- Long title: An Act to consolidate the provisions of the Metropolitan Board of Works Loans Acts 1869 to 1871 and the London County Council (Money) Acts 1875 to 1912 with respect to the raising of money by the London County Council on capital account and other matters with such amendments as are necessary to make those provisions applicable to existing conditions.
- Citation: 2 & 3 Geo. 5. c. cv
- Territorial extent: United Kingdom

Dates
- Royal assent: 7 August 1912
- Commencement: 7 August 1912 (Note: The Acts of Parliament (Commencement) Act 1793.)
- Repealed: 1 April 1956
Other legislation
Amends	See § Repealed enactments
Repeals/revokes	See § Repealed enactments
Amended by	London County Council (Money) Act 1953
Repealed by	London County Council (Loans) Act 1955

Status: Repealed

Text of statute as originally enacted

The London County Council (Finance Consolidation) Act 1912 (2 & 3 Geo. 5. c. cv) was an act of the Parliament of the United Kingdom that consolidated enactments related to the raising of money by the London County Council on capital account.

== Provisions ==
=== Repealed enactments ===
Section 48 of the act repealed 41 enactments, listed in the second schedule to the act.

Citation	Short title	Extent of repeal
32 & 33 Vict. c. 102	Metropolitan Board of Works (Loans) Act 1869	The whole act.
33 & 34 Vict. c. 24	Metropolitan Board of Works (Loans) Act 1870	The whole act.
34 & 35 Vict. c. 47	Metropolitan Board of Works (Loans) Act 1871	The whole act.
38 & 39 Vict. c. 65	Metropolitan Board of Works (Loans) Act 1875	The whole act.
39 & 40 Vict. c. 55	Metropolitan Board of Works (Loans) Act 1876	The whole act.
40 & 41 Vict. c. 52	Metropolitan Board of Works (Money) Act 1877	The whole act.
41 & 42 Vict. c. 37	Metropolitan Board of Works (Money) Act 1878	The whole act.
42 & 43 Vict. c. 69	Metropolitan Board of Works (Money) Act 1879	The whole act.
43 & 44 Vict. c. 25	Metropolitan Board of Works (Money) Act 1880	The whole act.
44 & 45 Vict. c. 48	Metropolitan Board of Works (Money) Act 1881	The whole act.
45 & 46 Vict. c. 33	Metropolitan Board of Works (Money) Act 1882	The whole act.
46 & 47 Vict. c. 27	Metropolitan Board of Works (Money) Act 1883	The whole act.
47 & 48 Vict. c. 50	Metropolitan Board of Works (Money) Act 1884	The whole act.
48 & 49 Vict. c. 50	Metropolitan Board of Works (Money) Act 1885	The whole act.
49 & 50 Vict. c. 44	Metropolitan Board of Works (Money) Act 1886	The whole act.
50 & 51 Vict. c. 31	Metropolitan Board of Works (Money) Act 1887	The whole act.
51 & 52 Vict. c. 40	Metropolitan Board of Works (Money) Act 1888	The whole act.
52 & 53 Vict. c. 61	London Council (Money) Act 1889	The whole act.
53 & 54 Vict. c. 41	London County Council (Money) Act 1890	The whole act.
54 & 55 Vict. c. 62	London County Council (Money) Act 1891	The whole act.
55 & 56 Vict. c. ccxxxvii	London County Council (Money) Act 1892	The whole act.
56 & 57 Vict. c. ccxi	London County Council (Money) Act 1893	The whole act.
57 & 58 Vict. c. clxiii	London County Council (Money) Act 1894	The whole act.
58 & 59 Vict. c. cxl	London County Council (Money) Act 1895	The whole act.
59 & 60 Vict. c. ccxiv	London County Council (Money) Act 1896	The whole act.
60 & 61 Vict. c. ccxx	London County Council (Money) Act 1897	The whole act.
61 & 62 Vict. c. ccxxii	London County Council (Money) Act 1898	The whole act.
62 & 63 Vict. c. ccxxxviii	London County Council (Money) Act 1899	The whole act.
63 & 64 Vict. c. ccxvi	London County Council (Money) Act 1900	The whole act.
1 Edw. 7. c. lxxxvii	London County Council (Money) Act 1901	The whole act.
2 Edw. 7. c. clxiv	London County Council (Money) Act 1902	The whole act.
3 Edw. 7. c. ccxviii	London County Council (Money) Act 1903	The whole act.
4 Edw. 7. c. xcvii	London County Council (Money) Act 1904	The whole act.
5 Edw. 7. c. cxliii	London County Council (Money) Act 1905	The whole act.
6 Edw. 7. c. cxciii	London County Council (Money) Act 1906	The whole act.
7 Edw. 7. c. cxxxviii	London County Council (Money) Act 1907	The whole act.
8 Edw. 7. c. lxxix	London County Council (Money) Act 1908	The whole act.
9 Edw. 7. c. lxxxi	London County Council (Money) Act 1909	The whole act.
10 Edw. 7 & 1 Geo. 5. c. cxv	London County Council (Money) Act 1910	The whole act.
1 & 2 Geo. 5. c. cxiv	London County Council (Money) Act 1911	The whole act.
2 & 3 Geo. 5. c. ciii	London County Council (Money) Act 1912	The whole act.

== Subsequent developments ==
The whole act was repealed by section 49 of, and the third schedule to, the London County Council (Loans) Act 1955 (4 & 5 Eliz. 2. c. xxvi), which came into operation on 1 April 1956.

== Bibliography ==
- Annual Report of the Proceedings of the Council. London County Council. 1913.
- Hill, Harold Arthur; Naylor, T. W. (1933). The Complete Law of Town and Country Planning. Butterworth. p. 162.
