= Regimental Debts Act 1893 =

Act of the Parliament of the United Kingdom

Regimental Debts Act 1893 (Note: Section 33.) (Note: The act was renamed to the Debts (Deceased Servicemen etc) Act 1893 by section 378(1) of, and schedule 16 to, the Armed Forces Act 2006.)
- Act of Parliament
- Parliament of the United Kingdom
- Long title: An Act to consolidate and amend the Law relating to the Payment of Regimental Debts, and the Collection and Disposal of the Effects of Officers and Soldiers in case of Death, Desertion, Insanity, and other cases.
- Citation: 56 & 57 Vict. c. 5
- Territorial extent: United Kingdom (Note: Section 30.)

Dates
- Royal assent: 29 April 1893
- Commencement: 1 October 1893 (Note: Section 31.)
Other legislation
Amends	Regulation of the Forces Act 1881
Repeals/revokes	Regimental Debts Act 1863
Amended by	Statute Law Revision Act 1950; Statute Law (Repeals) Act 1973; Statute Law (Repeals) Act 1975; Armed Forces Act 2006

Status: Amended

Text of statute as originally enacted

Revised text of statute as amended

Text of the Regimental Debts Act 1893 as in force today (including any amendments) within the United Kingdom, from legislation.gov.uk.

The Regimental Debts Act 1893 (56 & 57 Vict. c. 5), also known as the Debts (Deceased Servicemen etc.) Act 1893, is an act of the Parliament of the United Kingdom that consolidated enactments relating to regimental debts.

== Provisions ==
=== Repealed enactments ===
Section 32 of the act repealed the Regimental Debts Act, 1863 (26 & 27 Vict. c. 57) and section 1 of the Regulation of the Forces Act 1881 (44 & 45 Vict. c. 57).

== Subsequent developments ==
In section 29 of the act (definitions) the words " although not holding an honorary commission " were repealed by section 1(1) of, and the first schedule to, the Statute Law Revision Act 1950 (14 Geo. 6. c. 6), which came into force on 23 May 1950.

In section 16, the words " or India ", and in section 29, in the definition of " representation ", the words " India or ", wherever occurring, and, in the definition of " official administrator ", the words " means in India the administrator-general of any province, and ", were repealed by section 1(1) of, and part VII of schedule 1 to, the Statute Law (Repeals) Act 1973, which came into force on 18 July 1973.

In section 9(1) of the act, the words " military or other " were repealed by section 1(1) of, and part XIII of the schedule to, the Statute Law (Repeals) Act 1975, which came into force on 13 March 1975.

The act was renamed to the Debts (Deceased Servicemen etc.) Act 1893 by section 378(1) of, and schedule 16 to, the Armed Forces Act 2006.
