= List of acts of the Parliament of the United Kingdom from 1863 =

This is a complete list of acts of the Parliament of the United Kingdom for the year 1863.

Note that the first parliament of the United Kingdom was held in 1801; parliaments between 1707 and 1800 were either parliaments of Great Britain or of Ireland). For acts passed up until 1707, see the list of acts of the Parliament of England and the list of acts of the Parliament of Scotland. For acts passed from 1707 to 1800, see the list of acts of the Parliament of Great Britain. See also the list of acts of the Parliament of Ireland.

For acts of the devolved parliaments and assemblies in the United Kingdom, see the list of acts of the Scottish Parliament, the list of acts of the Northern Ireland Assembly, and the list of acts and measures of Senedd Cymru; see also the list of acts of the Parliament of Northern Ireland.

The number shown after each act's title is its chapter number. Acts passed before 1963 are cited using this number, preceded by the year(s) of the reign during which the relevant parliamentary session was held; thus the Union with Ireland Act 1800 is cited as "39 & 40 Geo. 3 c. 67", meaning the 67th act passed during the session that started in the 39th year of the reign of George III and which finished in the 40th year of that reign. Note that the modern convention is to use Arabic numerals in citations (thus "41 Geo. 3" rather than "41 Geo. III"). Acts of the last session of the Parliament of Great Britain and the first session of the Parliament of the United Kingdom are both cited as "41 Geo. 3".

Some of these acts have a short title. Some of these acts have never had a short title. Some of these acts have a short title given to them by later acts, such as by the Short Titles Act 1896.

== 26 & 27 Vict. ==
The fifth session of the 18th Parliament of the United Kingdom, which met from 5 February 1863 until 28 July 1863.

=== Public general acts ===
Short title	Citation	Royal assent
Long title
Annuities (Prince of Wales, etc.) Act 1863 (repealed)	26 & 27 Vict. c. 1	5 March 1863
An act to enable Her Majesty to provide for the Establishment of His Royal Highness the Prince of Wales and Her Royal Highness the Princess Alexandra of Denmark, (Note: Alexandra of Denmark.) and to settle certain Annuities on Her Royal Highness. (Repealed by Civil List Act 1901 (1 Edw. 7. c. 4))
Bills and Notes (Metropolis) Act 1863 (repealed)	26 & 27 Vict. c. 2	5 March 1863
An Act to make Provision concerning Bills of Exchange and Promissory Notes payable in the Metropolis on the Day appointed for the Passage through the Metropolis of Her Royal Highness the Princess Alexandra of Denmark. (Repealed by Statute Law Revision Act 1875 (38 & 39 Vict. c. 66))
Excise Duty on Malt Act 1863 (repealed)	26 & 27 Vict. c. 3	27 March 1863
An Act to extend the Credit for Payment of a Portion of the Excise Duty on Malt. (Repealed by Inland Revenue Act 1880 (43 & 44 Vict. c. 20))
Union Relief Aid Continuance Act 1863 (repealed)	26 & 27 Vict. c. 4	27 March 1863
An Act to extend for a further Period the Provisions of the Union Relief Aid Act (Note: Union Relief Aid Act 1862 (25 & 26 Vict. c. 110)) of the last Session. (Repealed by Statute Law Revision Act 1875 (38 & 39 Vict. c. 66))
Naval Coast Volunteers Act 1863 (repealed)	26 & 27 Vict. c. 5	27 March 1863
An Act to amend the Law relating to the Royal Naval Coast Volunteers. (Repealed by Statute Law Revision Act 1875 (38 & 39 Vict. c. 66))
Consolidated Fund (£10,000,000) Act or the Supply Act 1863 (repealed)	26 & 27 Vict. c. 6	27 March 1863
An Act to apply the Sum of Ten Millions out of the Consolidated Fund to the Service of the Year One thousand eight hundred and sixty-three. (Repealed by Statute Law Revision Act 1875 (38 & 39 Vict. c. 66))
Manufactured Tobacco Act 1863 (repealed)	26 & 27 Vict. c. 7	27 March 1863
An Act for altering the Duties on Tobacco, and permitting the Manufacture of Cavendish and Negrohead in Bond. (Repealed by Customs and Excise Act 1952 (15 & 16 Geo. 6 & 1 Eliz. 2. c. 44))
Mutiny Act 1863 (repealed)	26 & 27 Vict. c. 8	20 April 1863
An Act for punishing Mutiny and Desertion, and for the better Payment of the Army and their Quarters. (Repealed by Statute Law Revision Act 1875 (38 & 39 Vict. c. 66))
Marine Mutiny Act 1863 (repealed)	26 & 27 Vict. c. 9	20 April 1863
An Act for the Regulation of Her Majesty's Royal Marine Forces while on shore. (Repealed by Statute Law Revision Act 1875 (38 & 39 Vict. c. 66))
Salmon Acts Amendment Act 1863 (repealed)	26 & 27 Vict. c. 10	20 April 1863
An Act for prohibiting the Exportation of Salmon at certain Times. (Repealed by Salmon Act 1986 (c. 62))
Registration of Births and Deaths (Ireland) Act 1863 (repealed)	26 & 27 Vict. c. 11	20 April 1863
An Act for the Registration of Births and Deaths in Ireland. (Repealed by Births and Deaths Registration Act (Northern Ireland) 1967 (c. 25 (N.I.)))
Secretary at War Abolition Act 1863 (repealed)	26 & 27 Vict. c. 12	4 May 1863
An Act to abolish the Office of Secretary at War, and to transfer the Duties of that Office to One of Her Majesty's Principal Secretaries of State. (Repealed by Defence (Transfer of Functions) (No. 1) Order 1964 (SI 1964/488))
Town Gardens Protection Act 1863	26 & 27 Vict. c. 13	4 May 1863
An Act for the Protection of certain Garden or Ornamental Grounds in Cities and Boroughs.
Post Office Savings Bank Act 1863 (repealed)	26 & 27 Vict. c. 14	4 May 1863
An Act to amend the Law relating to Post Office Savings Banks. (Repealed by Post Office Savings Bank Act 1954 (2 & 3 Eliz. 2. c. 62) and Trustee Savings Banks Act 1954 (2 & 3 Eliz. 2. c. 63))
Consolidated Fund (£20,000,000) Act or the Supply (No. 2) Act 1863 (repealed)	26 & 27 Vict. c. 15	11 May 1863
An Act to apply the Sum of Twenty Millions out of the Consolidated Fund to the Service of the Year One thousand eight hundred and sixty-three. (Repealed by Statute Law Revision Act 1875 (38 & 39 Vict. c. 66))
Exchequer Bonds Act 1863 (repealed)	26 & 27 Vict. c. 16	11 May 1863
An Act for raising the Sum of One Million Pounds by Exchequer. Bonds for the Service of the Year One thousand eight hundred and sixty-three. (Repealed by Statute Law Revision Act 1875 (38 & 39 Vict. c. 66))
Local Government Act Amendment Act 1863 or the Local Government Amendment Act 1863 (repealed)	26 & 27 Vict. c. 17	11 May 1863
An Act for amending the Local Government Act (1858). (Note: Local Government Act 1858 (21 & 22 Vict. c. 98)) (Repealed by Public Health Act 1875 (38 & 39 Vict. c. 55))
Annual Inclosure Act 1863	26 & 27 Vict. c. 18	11 May 1863
An Act to authorize the Inclosure of certain Lands in pursuance of a Report of the Inclosure Commissioners for England and Wales.
Sale of Hares (Ireland) Act 1863 (repealed)	26 & 27 Vict. c. 19	8 June 1863
An Act to amend the Law relative to the Sale of Hares in Ireland. (Repealed by Statute Law Revision Act 1875 (38 & 39 Vict. c. 66))
Elections in Recess Act 1863 (repealed)	26 & 27 Vict. c. 20	8 June 1863
An Act to further limit and define the Time for proceeding to Election during the Recess. (Repealed by Recess Elections Act 1975 (c. 66))
Bastardy (Ireland) Act 1863 (repealed)	26 & 27 Vict. c. 21	8 June 1863
An Act to amend the Law enabling Boards of Guardians to recover Costs of Maintenance of illegitimate Children in certain Cases in Ireland. (Repealed by Illegitimate Children (Affiliation Orders) Act (Northern Ireland) 1924 (14 & 15 Geo. 5. c. 27 (N.I.)))
Customs and Inland Revenue Act 1863 (repealed)	26 & 27 Vict. c. 22	8 June 1863
An Act to grant certain Duties of Customs and Inland Revenue. (Repealed by Statute Law Revision Act 1875 (38 & 39 Vict. c. 66) and Customs Consolidation Act 1876 (39 & 40 Vict. c. 36))
New Zealand Boundaries Act 1863	26 & 27 Vict. c. 23	8 June 1863
An Act to alter the Boundaries of New Zealand.
Vice Admiralty Courts Act 1863 (repealed)	26 & 27 Vict. c. 24	8 June 1863
An Act to facilitate the Appointment of Vice Admirals and of Officers in Vice Admiralty Courts in Her Majesty's Possessions abroad, and to confirm the past Proceedings, to extend the Jurisdiction, and to amend the Practice of those Courts. (Repealed by Colonial Courts of Admiralty Act 1890 (53 & 54 Vict. c. 27))
Savings Bank Investment Act 1863 (repealed)	26 & 27 Vict. c. 25	8 June 1863
An Act to make further Provision for the Investment of the Monies received by the Commissioners for the Reduction of the National Debt from the Trustees of Savings Banks established under the Enactments of the Act Ninth George the Fourth, Chapter Ninety-two. (Repealed by National Loans Act 1968 (c. 13))
Land Drainage Act (Ireland) 1863 or the Land Drainage (Ireland) Act 1863 (repealed)	26 & 27 Vict. c. 26	8 June 1863
An Act to facilitate the Drainage of Land in Ireland. (Repealed by Statute Law Revision Act (Northern Ireland) 1954 (c. 35 (N.I.)))
Marriage Law (Ireland) Amendment Act 1863	26 & 27 Vict. c. 27	8 June 1863
An Act to amend the Law relating to Marriages in Ireland.
Stock Certificate Act 1863 (repealed)	26 & 27 Vict. c. 28	8 June 1863
An Act to give further Facilities to the Holders of the Public Stocks. (Repealed by Statute Law Revision Act 1870 (33 & 34 Vict. c. 69))
Corrupt Practices Prevention Act 1863 (repealed)	26 & 27 Vict. c. 29	8 June 1863
An Act to amend and continue the Law relating to Corrupt Practices at Elections of Members of Parliament. (Repealed by Representation of the People Act 1949 (12, 13 & 14 Geo. 6. c. 68))
Dockyards Protection Act Amendment Act 1863 (repealed)	26 & 27 Vict. c. 30	22 June 1863
An Act to authorize further Harbour Regulations for the Protection of Her Majesty's Ships, Dockyards, and Naval Stations. (Repealed by Admiralty, &c. Acts Repeal Act 1865 (28 & 29 Vict. c. 112))
Cayman Islands Act 1863 (repealed)	26 & 27 Vict. c. 31	22 June 1863
An Act for the Government of the Cayman Islands. (Repealed by Cayman Islands and Turks and Caicos Islands Act 1958 (6 & 7 Eliz. 2. c. 13))
Local Government Supplemental Act 1863	26 & 27 Vict. c. 32	29 June 1863
An Act to confirm certain Provisional Orders under the Local Government Act (1858) relating to the Districts of Basford, Teignmouth, Kingston-upon-Hull, Nottingham, Bradford, Ryde, Bedford, Croydon, Batley, Berwick-upon-Tweed, Sheerness, and Bromsgrove.
	Provisional Order putting in force the Lands Clauses Consolidation Act, 1845, (Note: Lands Clauses Consolidation Act 1845 (8 & 9 Vict. c. 18)) within the District of the Basford Local Board in the County of Nottingham, for the Purchase of Lands by the said Board for Street Improvements.	
	Provisional Order putting in force the Lands Clauses Consolidation Act, 1845, within the District of the Teignmouth Local Board, for the Purchase of Land by the said Board for a Public Road.	
	Provisional Order putting in force the Lands Clauses Consolidation Act, 1845, within the Borough of Kingston-upon-Hull, for the Purchase of Lands by the Local Board of Health of the aforesaid Borough for Street Improvements.	
	Provisional Order putting in force the Lands Clauses Consolidation Act, 1845, within the District of the Local Board for the Borough of Nottingham, for the Purchase and taking of Lands by the said Board otherwise than by Agreement.	
	Provisional Order putting in force the Lands Clauses Consolidation Act, 1845, within the District of the Bradford Local Board of Health, for the Purchase of Land by the said Board for Street Improvements.	
	Provisional Order altering the Kingston-upon-Hull Improvement Act, 1854, (Note: Kingston-upon-Hull Improvement Act 1854 (17 & 18 Vict. c. ci)) in force within the Borough of Kingston-upon-Hull, incorporating in it Provisions of the Towns Improvements Clauses Act, 1847, (Note: Towns Improvement Clauses Act 1847 (10 & 11 Vict. c. 34)) respecting Streets, providing for the Recovery of Expenses incurred in the making good of Streets, and extending Provisions for preventing Fraud in the Sale and Delivery of Coal.	
	Provisional Order for extending the Borrowing Powers of the Ryde Commissioners acting as Local Board within the District of Ryde in the Isle of Wight.	
	Provisional Order repealing and altering Parts of Local Acts in force within the District of the Bedford Local Board.	
	Provisional Order for altering the Provisional Order applying the Public Health Act, 1848, (Note: Public Health Act 1848 (11 & 12 Vict. c. 63)) to the District of Croydon in the County of Surrey.	
	Provisional Order for altering the Order in Council applying the Public Health Act, 1848, to the District of Batley in the County of York.	
	Provisional Order for extending the Borrowing Powers of the Berwick-upon-Tweed Local Board of Health.	
	Provisional Order for extending the Borrowing Powers of the Sheerness Local Board of Health.	
	Provisional Order altering parts of a Local Act (Note: Bromsgrove Improvement and Small Tenements Act 1846 (9 & 10 Vict. c. cxxiv)) in force within the District of the Bromsgrove Local Board.	
Revenue Act 1863 (repealed)	26 & 27 Vict. c. 33	29 June 1863
An Act for granting to Her Majesty certain Duties of Inland Revenue; and to amend the Laws relating to the Inland Revenue. (Repealed for England and Wales and Scotland by Cheap Trains Act 1883 (46 & 47 Vict. c. 34), Statute Law Revision Act 1893 (56 & 57 Vict. c. 14), Finance (1909-10) Act 1910 (10 Edw. 7 & 1 Geo. 5. c. 8), Customs and Excise Act 1952 (15 & 16 Geo. 6 & 1 Eliz. 2. c. 44) and Statute Law Revision Act 1964 (c. 79) and for Northern Ireland by Licensing Act (Northern Ireland) 1971 (c. 13 (N.I.)))
African Slave Trade Treaty Act 1863 (repealed)	26 & 27 Vict. c. 34	29 June 1863
An Act to carry into effect an additional Article to the Treaty of the Seventh Day of April One thousand eight hundred and sixty-two, between Her Majesty and the United States of America, for the Suppression of the African Slave Trade. (Repealed by Slave Trade Act 1873 (36 & 37 Vict. c. 88))
South Africa Offences Act 1863 (repealed)	26 & 27 Vict. c. 35	29 June 1863
An Act for the Prevention and Punishment of Offences committed by Her Majesty's Subjects in South Africa. (Repealed by Statute Law (Repeals) Act 1973 (c. 39))
London Diocese Act 1863 (repealed)	26 & 27 Vict. c. 36	29 June 1863
An Act for carrying into effect the Report of the Commissioners appointed to inquire into the State of the Dioceses of Canterbury, London, Winchester, and Rochester; and for other Purposes. (Repealed by Statute Law (Repeals) Act 1971 (c. 52))
Militia Pay Act 1863 (repealed)	26 & 27 Vict. c. 37	29 June 1863
An Act to defray the Charge of the Pay, Clothing, and contingent and other Expenses of the Disembodied Militia in Great Britain and Ireland; to grant Allowances in certain Cases to Subaltern Officers, Adjutants, Paymasters, Quartermasters, Surgeons, Assistant Surgeons, and Surgeons Mates of the Militia; and to authorize the Employment of the Non-commissioned Officers. (Repealed by Statute Law Revision Act 1875 (38 & 39 Vict. c. 66))
Bleaching and Dyeing Works Act Amendment Act 1863 (repealed)	26 & 27 Vict. c. 38	29 June 1863
An Act to amend the Act for placing the Employment of Women, young Persons, and Children in Bleaching Works and Dyeing Works under the Regulations of the Factories Acts. (Repealed by Factory and Workshop Act 1870 (33 & 34 Vict. c. 62))
Second Annual Inclosure Act 1863	26 & 27 Vict. c. 39	13 July 1863
An Act to authorize the Inclosure of certain Lands in pursuance of a Special Report of the Inclosure Commissioners.
Bakehouse Regulation Act 1863 (repealed)	26 & 27 Vict. c. 40	13 July 1863
An Act for the Regulation of Bakehouses. (Repealed by Factory and Workshop Act 1878 (41 & 42 Vict. c. 16))
Innkeepers' Liability Act 1863 (repealed)	26 & 27 Vict. c. 41	13 July 1863
An Act to amend the Law respecting the Liability of Innkeepers, and to prevent certain Frauds upon them. (Repealed for England and Wales and Scotland by Hotel Proprietors Act 1956 (4 & 5 Eliz. 2. c. 62) and for Northern Ireland by Hotel Proprietors Act (Northern Ireland) 1958 (c. 32 (N.I.)))
Sale of Mill Sites, etc. (Ireland) Act 1863 (repealed)	26 & 27 Vict. c. 42	13 July 1863
An Act to amend the Act of the Twentieth and Twenty-first Years of Victoria, (Note: Public Works (Ireland) Act 1857 (20 & 21 Vict. c. 23)) authorizing the Sale of Mill Sites and Water Powers by the Commissioners of Public Works in Ireland. (Repealed by Statute Law Revision Act 1893 (56 & 57 Vict. c. 14))
Post Office Lands Act 1863 (repealed)	26 & 27 Vict. c. 43	13 July 1863
An Act to enable Her Majesty's Postmaster General to sell and otherwise dispose of Land. (Repealed by Post Office Act 1908 (8 Edw. 7. c. 48))
Garrotters Act 1863 or the Security from Violence Act 1863 (repealed)	26 & 27 Vict. c. 44	13 July 1863
An Act for the further Security of the Persons of Her Majesty's Subjects from personal Violence. (Repealed by Criminal Justice Act 1948 (11 & 12 Geo. 6. c. 58) and Treatment of Offenders Act (Northern Ireland) 1968 (c. 29 (N.I.)))
Metropolis Improvement Act 1863 (repealed)	26 & 27 Vict. c. 45	13 July 1863
An Act for making a new Street from Blackfriars to the Mansion House in the City of London in connexion with the Embankment of the River Thames on the Northern Side of that River; and for other Purposes. (Repealed by Local Law (Greater London Council and Inner London Boroughs) Order 1965 (SI 1965/540))
London Coal and Wine Duties Continuance Act 1863 (repealed)	26 & 27 Vict. c. 46	13 July 1863
An Act for further continuing and appropriating the London Coal and Wine Duties. (Repealed by Statute Law Revision Act 1893 (56 & 57 Vict. c. 14))
Church of Scotland Courts Act 1863	26 & 27 Vict. c. 47	13 July 1863
An Act for removing Doubts as to the Powers of the Courts of the Church of Scotland, and extending the Powers of the said Courts.
Mutiny, East Indies Act 1863 (repealed)	26 & 27 Vict. c. 48	13 July 1863
An Act to repeal the Act of the Twentieth and Twenty-first Years of Her Majesty, Chapter Sixty-six, (Note: Mutiny, etc., East Indies Act 1857 (20 & 21 Vict. c. 66)) for punishing Mutiny and Desertion of Officers and Soldiers in the Service of the East India Company; and for regulating in such Service the Payment of Regimental Debts and the Distribution of the Effects of Officers and Soldiers dying in the Service. (Repealed by Statute Law Revision Act 1875 (38 & 39 Vict. c. 66))
Duchy of Cornwall Management Act 1863	26 & 27 Vict. c. 49	13 July 1863
An Act giving Power to sell and dispose of Lands, Parcel of the Possessions of the Duchy of Cornwall, and to purchase other Lands to be annexed thereto, and to regulate future Grants of Leases of the Possessions of the said Duchy; and for other Purposes.
Salmon Fisheries (Scotland) Act 1863 (repealed)	26 & 27 Vict. c. 50	13 July 1863
An Act to continue the Powers of the Commissioners under the Salmon Fisheries (Scotland) Act (Note: Salmon Fisheries (Scotland) Act 1862 (25 & 26 Vict. c. 97)) until the First Day of January One thousand eight hundred and sixty-five, and to amend the said Act. (Repealed by Salmon Act 1986 (c. 62))
Passengers Act Amendment Act 1863 (repealed)	26 & 27 Vict. c. 51	13 July 1863
An Act to amend the Passengers Act, 1855. (Note: Passengers Act 1855 (18 & 19 Vict. c. 119)) (Repealed by Merchant Shipping Act 1894 (57 & 58 Vict. c. 60))
Vaccination (Ireland) Act 1863 (repealed)	26 & 27 Vict. c. 52	13 July 1863
An Act to further extend and make compulsory the Practice of Vaccination in Ireland. (Repealed by Vaccination (Repeals) Act (Northern Ireland) 1963 (c. 30 (N.I.)))
Militia Ballots Suspension Act 1863 (repealed)	26 & 27 Vict. c. 53	13 July 1863
An Act to suspend the making of Lists and the Ballots for the Militia of the United Kingdom. (Repealed by Statute Law Revision Act 1875 (38 & 39 Vict. c. 66))
Walmer Vesting Act 1863	26 & 27 Vict. c. 54	13 July 1863
An Act for vesting in Her Majesty's Principal Secretary of State for the War Department certain Lands and Hereditaments at Walmer in the County of Kent.
Poor Law Board Continuance Act 1863 (repealed)	26 & 27 Vict. c. 55	21 July 1863
An Act to continue the Poor Law Board for a limited Period. (Repealed by Statute Law Revision Act 1875 (38 & 39 Vict. c. 66))
Loan Act 1863 (repealed)	26 & 27 Vict. c. 56	21 July 1863
An Act to make perpetual an Act (Note: Loan Societies Act 1840 (3 & 4 Vict. c. 110)) to amend the Laws relating to Loan Societies. (Repealed by Statute Law Revision Act 1875 (38 & 39 Vict. c. 66))
Regimental Debts Act 1863 (repealed)	26 & 27 Vict. c. 57	21 July 1863
An Act to consolidate and amend the Acts relating to the Payment of Regimental Debts, and the Distribution of the Effects of Officers and Soldiers in case of Death, and to make like Provision for the Cases of Desertion and Insanity, and other Cases. (Repealed by Regimental Debts Act 1893 (56 & 57 Vict. c. 5))
Hitcham's Charity Act 1863 (repealed)	26 & 27 Vict. c. 58	21 July 1863
An Act for confirming a Scheme of the Charity Commissioners for the Management of the Charity of Sir Robert Hitcham, Knight, King's Serjeant, for the Benefit of Framlingham, Debenham, and Levington, in the County of Suffolk, and of Coggeshall in the County of Essex. (Repealed by Statute Law (Repeals) Act 1981 (c. 19))
Ruthin Charities Act 1863	26 & 27 Vict. c. 59	21 July 1863
An Act for confirming a Scheme of the Charity Commissioners for the Management of the Charities in the Borough of Ruthin in the County of Denbigh, comprising the Hospital of Christ and its subsidiary Endowments, the Grammar School, Edward Lloyd's Foundation, and Bishop Goodman's Charity.
General Police and Improvement (Scotland) Supplemental Act 1862 (repealed)	26 & 27 Vict. c. 60	21 July 1863
An Act to confirm a certain Provisional Order under the General Police and Improvement (Scotland) Act, 1862, (Note: General Police and Improvement (Scotland) Act 1862 (25 & 26 Vict. c. 101)) relating to the Burgh of Leith. (Repealed by Statute Law (Repeals) Act 1981 (c. 19))
	Leith.	
Highway Act 1863 (repealed)	26 & 27 Vict. c. 61	21 July 1863
An Act to prevent Waywardens contracting for Works within their own District. (Repealed by Statute Law Revision Act 1950 (14 Geo. 6. c. 6))
Seizure of Crops (Ireland) Act 1863 (repealed)	26 & 27 Vict. c. 62	21 July 1863
An Act to amend the Law relating to the Seizure of growing Crops in Ireland. (Repealed by Statute Law Revision Act 1875 (38 & 39 Vict. c. 66), Statute Law Revision Act 1893 (56 & 57 Vict. c. 14) and County Courts Act (Northern Ireland) 1959 (c. 25 (N.I.)))
Land Drainage Supplemental Act 1863	26 & 27 Vict. c. 63	21 July 1863
An Act to confirm certain Provisional Orders under The Land Drainage Act, 1861. (Note: Land Drainage Act 1861 (24 & 25 Vict. c. 133))
	In the Matter of Morden Carrs. County of Durham.	
	In the Matter of Longdon and Eldersfield Drainage.	
	In the Matter of Maxey Drainage.	
Local Government Supplemental Act 1863 (No. 2) or the Local Government Supplemental (No. 2) Act 1863	26 & 27 Vict. c. 64	21 July 1863
An act to confirm certain Provisional Orders under the Local Government Act (1858), relating to the Districts of Plymouth, Holywell, Llanelly, West Ham, Worthing, Aberavon, and Wallasey.
	Provisional Order putting in force the Lands Clauses Consolidation Act, 1845, within the District of the Local Board for the Borough of Plymouth, for the Purchase and taking of Lands by the said Board otherwise than by Agreement.	
	Provisional Order putting in force the Lands Clauses Consolidation Act, 1845, within the Holywell Local Board District, for the Purchase and taking of Lands by the said Board otherwise than by Agreement.	
	Provisional Order putting in force the Lands Clauses Consolidation Act, 1845, within the District of the Local Board for the Borough of Llanelly, for the Purchase and taking of Lands by the said Board otherwise than by Agreement.	
	Provisional Order putting in force the Lands Clauses Consolidation Act, 1845, within the District of the West Ham Local Board of Health, for the Purchase and taking of Lands by the said Board otherwise than by Agreement; and for other Purposes therein set forth.	
	Provisional Order for altering the Provisional Order applying the Public Health Act, 1848, to the District of West Ham in the County of Essex; and for other Purposes.	
	Provisional Order repealing and altering Parts of a Local Act (Note: Worthing Improvement Act 1821 (1 & 2 Geo. 4. c. lix)) in force within the District of the Worthing Local Board of Health.	
	Provisional Order repealing a Local Act (Note: South Wales Highways Act 1860 (23 & 24 Vict. c. 68)) in force within the District of the Aberavon Board.	
	Provisional Order for extending the Borrowing Powers of the Wallasey Local Board of Health.	
Volunteer Act 1863 (repealed)	26 & 27 Vict. c. 65	21 July 1863
An act to consolidate and amend the Acts relating to the Volunteer Force in Great Britain. (Repealed by Statute Law Revision Act 1966 (c. 5))
Prisons (Ireland) Act 1863 (repealed)	26 & 27 Vict. c. 66	21 July 1863
An Act to amend the Law relating to Prisons in Ireland. (Repealed by Statute Law Revision Act 1893 (56 & 57 Vict. c. 14))
Greenwich Hospital (Provision for Widows) Act 1863 (repealed)	26 & 27 Vict. c. 67	21 July 1863
An Act to enable Provision to be made out of the Funds of Greenwich Hospital for the Widows of Seamen and Marines slain, killed, or drowned in the Sea Service of the Crown. (Repealed by Greenwich Hospital Act 1865 (28 & 29 Vict. c. 89))
Metropolitan Main Drainage Extension Act 1863 (repealed)	26 & 27 Vict. c. 68	21 July 1863
An Act to extend the Powers of the Act (Note: Metropolis Management Amendment Act 1858 (21 & 22 Vict. c. 104)) relating to the Main Drainage of the Metropolis. (Repealed by Metropolitan Board of Works (Loans) Act 1869 (32 & 33 Vict. c. 102))
Officers of Royal Naval Reserve Act 1863 (repealed)	26 & 27 Vict. c. 69	21 July 1863
An Act to establish Officers of the Royal Naval Reserve. (Repealed by Reserve Forces Act 1980 (c. 9))
Public Works (Manufacturing Districts) Act 1863 or the Public Works Act 1863 (repealed)	26 & 27 Vict. c. 70	21 July 1863
An Act to facilitate the Execution of Public Works in certain Manufacturing Districts; to authorize for that Purpose Advances of Public Money to a limited Amount upon Security of Local Rates; and to shorten the Period for the Adoption of the Local Government Act, 1858, in certain Cases. (Repealed by Statute Law Revision Act 1950 (14 Geo. 6. c. 6))
Harwich Harbour Act 1863	26 & 27 Vict. c. 71	28 July 1863
An Act for the Preservation and Improvement of Harwich Harbour.
Howth Harbour Act 1863	26 & 27 Vict. c. 72	28 July 1863
An Act for the further Improvement of the Harbour of Howth.
India Stock Certificate Act 1863 (repealed)	26 & 27 Vict. c. 73	28 July 1863
An Act to give further Facilities to the Holders of India Stock. (Repealed by Statute Law (Repeals) Act 1993 (c. 50))
Sydney Branch Mint Act 1863 (repealed)	26 & 27 Vict. c. 74	28 July 1863
An Act to enable Her Majesty to declare Gold Coins to be issued from Her Majesty's Branch Mint at Sydney, New South Wales, a legal Tender for Payments; and for other Purposes relating thereto. (Repealed by Coinage Act 1870 (33 & 34 Vict. c. 10))
Thames Embankment Act 1863	26 & 27 Vict. c. 75	28 July 1863
An Act for the Embankment of Part of the River Thames, on the South Side thereof, in the Parish of Saint Mary Lambeth, and for other Purposes.
Colonial Letters Patent Act 1863 (repealed)	26 & 27 Vict. c. 76	28 July 1863
An Act to determine the Time at which Letters Patent shall take effect in the Colonies. (Repealed by Statute Law (Repeals) Act 1973 (c. 39))
Summary Jurisdiction Act 1863 (repealed)	26 & 27 Vict. c. 77	28 July 1863
An Act to amend the Law relating to the Jurisdiction of Justices residing or being out of the County for which they are Justices. (Repealed by Magistrates' Courts Act 1952 (15 & 16 Geo. 6 & 1 Eliz. 2. c. 55))
Metropolis Roads Act 1863 or the Metropolis Roads Amendment Act 1863 (repealed)	26 & 27 Vict. c. 78	28 July 1863
An Act to amend the Acts relating to the Turnpike Roads in the Neighbourhood of the Metropolis North of the River Thames. (Repealed by Annual Turnpike Acts Continuance Act 1871 (34 & 35 Vict. c. 115))
Prison Ministers Act 1863 (repealed)	26 & 27 Vict. c. 79	28 July 1863
An Act for the Amendment of the Law relating to the Religious Instruction of Prisoners in County and Borough Prisons in England and Scotland. (Repealed for England and Wales by Prison Act 1952 (15 & 16 Geo. 6 & 1 Eliz. 2. c. 52) and for Scotland by Prisons (Scotland) Act 1952 (15 & 16 Geo. 6 & 1 Eliz. 2. c. 61))
Fortification for Royal Arsenals, etc. Act 1863 (repealed)	26 & 27 Vict. c. 80	28 July 1863
An Act for providing a further Sum towards defraying the Expenses of constructing Fortifications for the Protection of the Royal Arsenals and Dockyards and the Ports of Dover and Portland, and of erecting a Central Arsenal. (Repealed by Revenue, Friendly Societies, and National Debt Act 1882 (45 & 46 Vict. c. 72))
Public Works and Fisheries Acts Amendment Act 1863	26 & 27 Vict. c. 81	28 July 1863
An Act to amend, so far as regards Advances for the Purposes of the Harbours and Passing Tolls, &c. Act 1861, (Note: Harbours and Passing Tolls, &c. Act 1861 (24 & 25 Vict. c. 47)) certain of the Acts authorizing the Advance of Money out of the Consolidated Fund for carrying on Public Works and Fisheries and Employment of the Poor.
Church Services (Wales) Act 1863 or the English Services in Wales Act 1863 (repealed)	26 & 27 Vict. c. 82	28 July 1863
An Act to empower the Bishops of Welsh Dioceses to facilitate the making Provision for English Services in certain Parishes in Wales. (Repealed by Statute Law Revision Act 1950 (14 Geo. 6. c. 6))
British Columbia Boundaries Act 1863 (repealed)	26 & 27 Vict. c. 83	28 July 1863
An Act to define the Boundaries of the Colony of British Columbia, and to continue an Act (Note: British Columbia Government Act 1858 (21 & 22 Vict. c. 99)) to provide for the Government of the said Colony. (Repealed by British Columbia Act 1866 (29 & 30 Vict. c. 67))
Colonial Acts Confirmation Act 1863 (repealed)	26 & 27 Vict. c. 84	28 July 1863
An Act to confirm certain Acts of Colonial Legislatures. (Repealed by Statute Law Revision Act 1963 (c. 30))
Oaths Relief in Criminal Proceedings (Scotland) Act 1863 (repealed)	26 & 27 Vict. c. 85	28 July 1863
An Act to give Relief to Persons who may refuse or be unwilling, from alleged conscientious Motives, to be sworn in Criminal Proceedings in Scotland. (Repealed by Affirmations (Scotland) Act 1865 (28 & 29 Vict. c. 9))
Isle of Man Harbours Act 1863 (repealed)	26 & 27 Vict. c. 86	28 July 1863
An Act to authorize the taking of Harbour Dues At Port Erin in the Isle of Man, in order to provide a Fund for the Improvement of the Harbour; and for other Purposes. (Repealed by Isle of Man Harbours Act 1911 (1 & 2 Geo. 5. c. 33))
Trustee Savings Banks Act 1863 (repealed)	26 & 27 Vict. c. 87	28 July 1863
An Act to consolidate and amend the Laws relating to Savings Banks. (Repealed by Trustee Savings Banks Act 1954 (2 & 3 Eliz. 2. c. 63))
Drainage and Improvement of Lands Act (Ireland) 1863 or the Drainage and Improvement of Lands (Ireland) Act 1863 (repealed)	26 & 27 Vict. c. 88	28 July 1863
An Act to enable Landed Proprietors to construct Works for the Drainage and Improvement of Lands in Ireland. (Repealed by Erne Drainage and Development Act (Northern Ireland) 1950 (c. 15 (N.I.)))
Poor Removal Act 1863 (repealed)	26 & 27 Vict. c. 89	28 July 1863
An Act for the further Amendment of the Law relating to the Removal of Poor Persons, Natives of Ireland, from England. (Repealed for England and Wales and Scotland by National Assistance Act 1948 (11 & 12 Geo. 6. c. 29) and for Northern Ireland by Statute Law Revision Act (Northern Ireland) 1954 (c. 35 (N.I.)))
Registration of Marriages (Ireland) Act 1863	26 & 27 Vict. c. 90	28 July 1863
An Act to provide for the Registration of Marriages in Ireland.
Union Relief Aid Act 1863 (repealed)	26 & 27 Vict. c. 91	28 July 1863
An Act to extend for a further Period the Provisions of the Union Relief Aid Acts. (Repealed by Statute Law Revision Act 1875 (38 & 39 Vict. c. 66))
Railways Clauses Act 1863	26 & 27 Vict. c. 92	28 July 1863
An Act for consolidating in One Act certain Provisions frequently inserted in Acts relating to Railways.
Waterworks Clauses Act 1863 (repealed)	26 & 27 Vict. c. 93	28 July 1863
An Act for consolidating in One Act certain Provisions frequently inserted in Acts relating to Waterworks. (Repealed for England and Wales by Water Act 1945 (8 & 9 Geo. 6. c. 42), for Scotland by Water (Scotland) Act 1946 (9 & 10 Geo. 6. c. 42) and for Northern Ireland by Water and Sewerage Services (Northern Ireland) Order 1973 (SI 1973/70 (N.I. 2)))
Annual Turnpike Acts Continuance Act 1863 (repealed)	26 & 27 Vict. c. 94	28 July 1863
An Act to amend the Law relating to the Repair of Turnpike Roads in England, and to continue certain Turnpike Acts in Great Britain. (Repealed by Annual Turnpike Acts Continuance Act 1871 (34 & 35 Vict. c. 115), Statute Law Revision Act 1875 (38 & 39 Vict. c. 66) and Statute Law Revision Act 1950 (14 Geo. 6. c. 6))
Expiring Laws Continuance Act 1863 (repealed)	26 & 27 Vict. c. 95	28 July 1863
An Act for continuing various expiring Acts. (Repealed by Statute Law Revision Act 1875 (38 & 39 Vict. c. 66))
Petty Sessions (Ireland) Amendment Act 1863 (repealed)	26 & 27 Vict. c. 96	28 July 1863
An Act to amend the Petty Sessions (Ireland) Act, 1851, (Note: Petty Sessions (Ireland) Act 1851 (14 & 15 Vict. c. 93)) and the Petty Sessions Clerks (Ireland) Act, 1858. (Note: Petty Sessions Clerk (Ireland) Act 1858 (21 & 22 Vict. c. 100)) (Repealed by Licensing Act (Northern Ireland) 1971 (c. 13 (N.I.)))
Stipendiary Magistrates Act 1863 (repealed)	26 & 27 Vict. c. 97	28 July 1863
An Act to enable Cities, Towns, and Boroughs of Twenty-five thousand Inhabitants and upwards to appoint Stipendiary Magistrates. (Repealed by Justices of the Peace Act 1949 (12, 13 & 14 Geo. 6. c. 101))
Provisional Order Confirmation (Turnpikes) Act 1863 (repealed)	26 & 27 Vict. c. 98	28 July 1863
An Act to confirm certain Provisional Orders made under an Act of the Fifteenth Year of Her present Majesty, (Note: Turnpike Trusts (Making of Provisional Orders) Act 1851 (14 & 15 Vict. c. 38)) to facilitate Arrangements for the Relief of Turnpike Trusts. (Repealed by Statute Law (Repeals) Act 1981 (c. 19))
Appropriation Act 1863 (repealed)	26 & 27 Vict. c. 99	28 July 1863
An Act to apply a Sum out of the Consolidated Fund and the Surplus of Ways and Means to the Service of the Year One thousand eight hundred and sixty-three, and to appropriate the Supplies granted in this Session of Parliament. (Repealed by Statute Law Revision Act 1875 (38 & 39 Vict. c. 66))
Dogs (Scotland) Act 1863 (repealed)	26 & 27 Vict. c. 100	28 July 1863
An Act to render Owners of Dogs in Scotland liable in certain Cases for Injuries done by their Dogs to Sheep and Cattle. (Repealed by Dogs Act 1906 (6 Edw. 7. c. 32))
Land Tax Commissioners (Appointment) Act 1863 (repealed)	26 & 27 Vict. c. 101	28 July 1863
An Act to appoint additional Commissioners for executing the Acts for granting a Land Tax and other Rates and Taxes. (Repealed by Statute Law (Repeals) Act 1971 (c. 52))
Reduction of Duty on Rum Act 1863 (repealed)	26 & 27 Vict. c. 102	28 July 1863
An Act to reduce the Duty on Rum in certain Cases. (Repealed by Statute Law Revision Act 1878 (41 & 42 Vict. c. 79))
Misappropriation by Servants Act 1863 (repealed)	26 & 27 Vict. c. 103	28 July 1863
An Act to amend the Law in certain Cases of Misappropriation by Servants of the Property of their Masters. (Repealed by Theft Act 1968 (c. 60))
Pier and Harbour Orders Confirmation Act 1863	26 & 27 Vict. c. 104	28 July 1863
An Act for confirming certain Provisional Orders made by the Board of Trade under the General Pier and Harbour Act, 1861, (Note: General Pier and Harbour Act 1861 (24 & 25 Vict. c. 45)) relating to Blackpool, Deal, and Walmer, Exmouth, Rosehearty, Ilfracombe, Instow, Bangor, Chatham, Bray, Dartmouth, and Nairn.
	Blackpool Pier Order 1863 Provisional Order of the Board of Trade for the Construction, Maintenance, and Regulation of a Pier at Blackpool, in the County of Lancaster.	
	Deal and Walmer Pier Amendment Order 1863 Provisional Order of the Board of Trade for the Amendment of the Deal and Walmer Pier Order, 1862.	
	Exmouth Pier Order 1863 Provisional Order of the Board of Trade for the Construction, Maintenance, and Regulation of a Pier at Exmouth, in the County of Devon.	
	Rosehearty Harbour Order 1863 Provisional Order of the Board of Trade for the Improvement, Maintenance, and Regulation of the Harbour of Rosehearty, in the County of Aberdeen.	
	Ilfracombe Harbour Order 1863 Provisional Order of the Board of Trade for the Improvement, Maintenance, and Regulation of the Harbour at Ilfracombe, in the County of Devon.	
	North Devon Dock Order 1863 Provisional Order of the Board of Trade for the Construction, Maintenance, and Regulation of Docks at Instow, in the County of Devon.	
	Bangor Harbour Order 1863 Provisional Order of the Board of Trade for the Improvement, Maintenance, and Regulation of the Harbour of Bangor, in the County of Down.	
	Chatham Sun Pier Order 1863 Provisional Order of the Board of Trade for the Purchase, Maintenance, and Regulation of the Chatham Sun Pier at Chatham, in the County of Kent.	
	Bray Pier and Harbour Order 1863 Provisional Order of the Board of Trade for the Construction, Maintenance, and Regulation of a Pier and Harbour at Bray, in the County of Wicklow.	
	Dartmouth Harbour Order 1863 Provisional Order of the Board of Trade for the Improvement, Maintenance, and Regulation of the Harbour of Dartmouth, in the County of Devon.	
	Nairn Harbour Order 1863 Provisional Order of the Board of Trade for the Maintenance and Regulation of the Harbour of Nairn.	
Promissory Notes Act 1863 (repealed)	26 & 27 Vict. c. 105	28 July 1863
An Act to remove certain Restrictions on the Negotiation of Promissory Notes and Bills of Exchange under a limited Sum. (Repealed by Statute Law (Repeals) Act 1971 (c. 52))
Charity Lands Act 1863 (repealed)	26 & 27 Vict. c. 106	28 July 1863
An Act to farther amend the Law relating to the Conveyance of Land for Charitable Uses. (Repealed by Charities Act 1960 (8 & 9 Eliz. 2. c. 58))
Indemnity Act 1863 (repealed)	26 & 27 Vict. c. 107	28 July 1863
An Act to indemnify such Persons in the United Kingdom as have omitted to qualify themselves for Offices and Employments, and to extend the Time limited for those Purposes respectively. (Repealed by Promissory Oaths Act 1871 (34 & 35 Vict. c. 48))
Vaccination (Scotland) Act 1863 (repealed)	26 & 27 Vict. c. 108	28 July 1863
An Act to extend and make compulsory the Practice of Vaccination in Scotland. (Repealed by National Health Service (Scotland) Act 1947 (10 & 11 Geo. 6. c. 27) (Note: Incorrectly cited as "Nat Health Service (S), 1943 c 27" in the Chronological Table of the Statutes.))
Prisoners Removal (Scotland) Act 1863 (repealed)	26 & 27 Vict. c. 109	28 July 1863
An Act for remedying certain Defects in the Law relating to the Removal of Prisoners in Scotland. (Repealed by Prisons (Scotland) Act 1952 (15 & 16 Geo. 6 & 1 Eliz. 2. c. 61))
Lunacy Acts Amendment Act 1863 (repealed)	26 & 27 Vict. c. 110	28 July 1863
An Act to amend the Lunacy Acts in relation to the building of Asylums for Pauper Lunatics. (Repealed by Lunacy Act 1890 (53 & 54 Vict. c. 5))
Naval Medical, etc., Society Act 1863 (repealed)	26 & 27 Vict. c. 111	28 July 1863
An Act to amend the Naval Medical Supplemental Fund Society Winding-up Act, 1861. (Note: Naval Medical Supplemental Fund Society Winding-up Act 1861 (24 & 25 Vict. c. 108)) (Repealed by Naval Medical Compassionate Fund Act 1915 (5 & 6 Geo. 5. c. 28))
Telegraph Act 1863	26 & 27 Vict. c. 112	28 July 1863
An Act to regulate the Exercise of Powers under Special Acts for the Construction and Maintenance of Telegraphs.
Poisoned Grain Prohibition Act 1863 (repealed)	26 & 27 Vict. c. 113	28 July 1863
An Act to prohibit the Sale and Use of poisoned Grain or Seed. (Repealed for England and Wales and Ireland by Protection of Animals Act 1911 (1 & 2 Geo. 5. c. 27) and for Scotland by Protection of Animals (Scotland) Act 1912 (2 & 3 Geo. 5. c. 14))
Salmon Fishery (Ireland) Act 1863 (repealed)	26 & 27 Vict. c. 114	28 July 1863
An Act to amend the Laws relating to Fisheries in Ireland. (Repealed by Statute Law (Repeals) Act 1978 (c. 45))
Gratuitous Trustees (Scotland) Act 1863 (repealed)	26 & 27 Vict. c. 115	28 July 1863
An Act to explain the Act (Note: Trusts (Scotland) Act 1861 (24 & 25 Vict. c. 84)) for the Amendment of the Law relative to gratuitous Trustees in Scotland. (Repealed by Statute Law Revision Act 1893 (56 & 57 Vict. c. 14))
Navy Prize Agents Act 1863 (repealed)	26 & 27 Vict. c. 116	28 July 1863
An Act to provide for the Appointment of Navy Prize Agents, and respecting their Duties and Remuneration. (Repealed by Naval Prize Acts Repeal Act 1864 (27 & 28 Vict. c. 23))
Nuisances Removal Act for England (Amendment) Act 1863 (repealed)	26 & 27 Vict. c. 117	28 July 1863
An Act to amend the Nuisances Removal Act for England, 1855, (Note: Nuisances Removal Act for England 1855 (18 & 19 Vict. c. 121)) with respect to the Seizure of diseased and unwholesome Meat. (Repealed for England and Wales by Public Health Act 1875 (38 & 39 Vict. c. 55), for Ireland by Public Health (Ireland) Act 1878 (41 & 42 Vict. c. 52) and for London by Public Health (London) Act 1891 (54 & 55 Vict. c. 76))
Companies Clauses Act 1863	26 & 27 Vict. c. 118	28 July 1863
An Act for consolidating in One Act certain Provisions frequently inserted in Acts relating to the Constitution and Management of Companies incorporated for carrying on Undertakings of a public Nature.
Exhibition Medals Act 1863 (repealed)	26 & 27 Vict. c. 119	28 July 1863
An Act to prevent false Representations as to Grants of Medals or Certificates made by the Commissioners for the Exhibitions of 1851 and 1862. (Repealed by Statute Law Revision Act 1958 (6 & 7 Eliz. 2. c. 46))
Lord Chancellor's Augmentation Act 1863 (repealed)	26 & 27 Vict. c. 120	28 July 1863
An Act for the Augmentation of certain Benefices, the Right of Presentation to which is vested in the Lord Chancellor. (Repealed by Statute Law (Repeals) Act 1969 (c. 52))
Clergymen Ordained Abroad Act 1863 (repealed)	26 & 27 Vict. c. 121	28 July 1863
An Act to establish the Validity of Acts performed in Her Majesty's Possessions abroad by certain Clergymen ordained in Foreign Parts, and to extend the Powers of Colonial Legislatures with respect to such Clergymen. (Repealed by Statute Law Revision Act 1875 (38 & 39 Vict. c. 66))
Power to Alter the Circuits of Judges Act 1863 (repealed)	26 & 27 Vict. c. 122	28 July 1863
An Act to enable Her Majesty in Council to make Alterations in the Circuits of the Judges. (Repealed by Statute Law Revision Act 1893 (56 & 57 Vict. c. 14))
Church of Ireland Act 1863	26 & 27 Vict. c. 123	28 July 1863
An Act to amend the Law relating to District Parochial Churches in Ireland.
Alkali Act 1863 (repealed)	26 & 27 Vict. c. 124	28 July 1863
An Act for the more effectual condensation of Muriatic Acid Gas in Alkali Works. (Repealed by Alkali, &c. Works Regulation Act 1881 (44 & 45 Vict. c. 37))
Statute Law Revision Act 1863	26 & 27 Vict. c. 125	28 July 1863
An Act for promoting the Revision of the Statute Law by repealing certain Enactments which have ceased to be in force or have become unnecessary.

=== Local acts ===
Short title	Citation	Royal assent
Long title
Cambridge Streets Act 1863	26 & 27 Vict. c. i	4 May 1863
An Act for stopping up certain Streets and widening other Streets in the Borough of Cambridge.
Mid Wales Railway Capital Act 1863	26 & 27 Vict. c. ii	4 May 1863
An Act to enable the Mid-Wales Railway Company to raise a further Sum of Money.
Berks and Hants Extension Railway Act 1863	26 & 27 Vict. c. iii	4 May 1863
An Act to grant further Powers to the Berks and Hants Extension Railway Company.
Market Harborough and Loughborough Road Act 1863 (repealed)	26 & 27 Vict. c. iv	4 May 1863
An Act for repairing the Road from Market Harborough to Loughborough in the County of Leicester; and for other Purposes. (Repealed by Annual Turnpike Acts Continuance Act 1878 (41 & 42 Vict. c. 62))
London and North Western and Lancashire and Yorkshire Companies (North Union and Preston and Wyre Railway, Harbour and Dock) Act 1863	26 & 27 Vict. c. v	4 May 1863
An Act for enabling the London and North-western and Lancashire and Yorkshire Railway Companies to raise further Monies for Purposes connected with the North Union Railway and the Preston and Wyre Railway, Harbour, and Dock; and for other Purposes.
South Staffordshire Railway Act 1863	26 & 27 Vict. c. vi	4 May 1863
An Act for conferring further Powers on the South Staffordshire Railway Company with respect to their Undertaking; and for other Purposes.
Glasgow Gaslight Company's Act 1863 (repealed)	26 & 27 Vict. c. vii	4 May 1863
An Act to regulate the Mode of Valuation of certain underground Gas Pipes or Works in the City of Glasgow, for the Purpose of Assessments under "The Glasgow Police Act, 1862," (Note: Glasgow Police Act 1862 (25 & 26 Vict. c. cciv)) in conformity with the Provisions of "The General Police and Improvement (Scotland) Act, 1862." (Note: General Police and Improvement (Scotland) Act 1862 (25 & 26 Vict. c. 101)) (Repealed by Glasgow Gas Act 1910 (10 Edw. 7 & 1 Geo. 5. c. cxxxi))
Leyland and Farington Gas Act 1863	26 & 27 Vict. c. viii	4 May 1863
An Act for lighting with Gas Leyland and Farington, and other Places in the Neighbourhood thereof, in Lancashire.
Hereford, Hay and Brecon Railway Act 1863	26 & 27 Vict. c. ix	4 May 1863
An Act to enable the Hereford, Hay, and Brecon Railway Company to raise a further Sum of Money; and for other Purposes.
Caledonian Railway (Bredisholm Deviation) Act 1863	26 & 27 Vict. c. x	4 May 1863
An Act to enable the Caledonian Railway Company to make a Deviation of their Rutherglen and Coatbridge Branch in the County of Lanark; and for other Purposes.
Scarborough Waterworks Amendment Act 1863	26 & 27 Vict. c. xi	4 May 1863
An Act to enable the Scarborough Waterworks Company to raise further Sums of Money; and for other Purposes.
Harrogate Gas Company's Act 1863	26 & 27 Vict. c. xii	4 May 1863
An Act to enable the Harrogate Gas Company to raise additional Capital; to extend their Limits for supplying Gas; to repeal, amend, and extend the Act relating to the Company; and for other Purposes.
Swansea Municipal Corporation Act 1863	26 & 27 Vict. c. xiii	4 May 1863
An Act to confer upon the Mayor, Aldermen, and Burgesses of the Borough of Swansea further Powers for the Improvement and Regulation of the Markets and Fairs in the said Borough, and also for commuting or disposing of certain Quayage and Town Dues now payable in the said Borough, and for the better Government and Regulation of the said Borough.
Glasgow and South Western Railway (Capital) Act 1863	26 & 27 Vict. c. xiv	4 May 1863
An Act to enable the Glasgow and South-western Railway Company to raise a further Sum of Money; and for other Purposes.
Leeds Gaslight Company's Act 1863 (repealed)	26 & 27 Vict. c. xv	4 May 1863
An Act to enable the Leeds Gaslight Company to raise a further Sum of Money, to extend their Limits of Supply; and for other Purposes. (Repealed by Leeds Corporation (Consolidation) Act 1905 (5 Edw. 7. c. i))
Workington Wet Dock Act 1863 (repealed)	26 & 27 Vict. c. xvi	11 May 1863
An Act to enable the Right Honourable William Earl of Lonsdale to make and maintain a Wet Dock at Workington in the County of Cumberland, and a Railway therefrom to join the Whitehaven Junction Railway, in lieu of the Dock or Tidal Basin and Railway authorized by "The Workington Dock Act, 1861;" (Note: Workington Dock Act 1861 (24 & 25 Vict. c. lxxxiii)) and for other Purposes. (Repealed by Workington Harbour and Dock (Transfer) Act 1957 (5 & 6 Eliz. 2. c. xxxii))
Denbigh Waterworks Act 1863	26 & 27 Vict. c. xvii	11 May 1863
An Act for better supplying the Town of Denbigh and Neighbourhood thereof with Water, and for other Purposes.
North Bierley Gas Act 1863 (repealed)	26 & 27 Vict. c. xviii	11 May 1863
An Act to incorporate the North Bierley Gaslight and Coke Company, Limited, and to make further Provision for lighting North Bierley and other Townships and Places in the Neighbourhood thereof with Gas. (Repealed by West Yorkshire Act 1980 (c. xiv))
St. Asaph and Conway Turnpike Road Act 1863 (repealed)	26 & 27 Vict. c. xix	11 May 1863
An Act to repeal an Act passed in the Third Year of the Reign of His late Majesty King William the Fourth, (Note: Road from Pant Evan Brook to Abergele Act 1833 (3 & 4 Will. 4. c. xxvi)) intituled "An Act for the more effectually repairing and maintaining the Turnpike Road from Pant Evan Brook in the County of Flint to Abergele in the County of Denbigh, and thence to Conway Ferry House in the County of Carnarvon. (Repealed by Annual Turnpike Acts Continuance Act 1882 (45 & 46 Vict. c. 52))
Vale of Llangollen Railway Act 1863	26 & 27 Vict. c. xx	11 May 1863
An Act for enabling the Vale of Llangollen Railway Company to raise additional Capital; and for other Purposes.
Van Diemen's Land Company's Act 1863	26 & 27 Vict. c. xxi	11 May 1863
An Act to reduce and regulate the Capital of the Van Diemen's Land Company.
Peterborough Cattle Market Act 1863	26 & 27 Vict. c. xxii	11 May 1863
An Act for providing a Cattle Market in the City of Peterborough, and for other Purposes.
Aylesbury Market Act 1863	26 & 27 Vict. c. xxiii	11 May 1863
An Act to incorporate a Company for holding a Market and Fairs in the Town and Parish of Aylesbury in the County of Buckingham; and for other Purposes.
Caledonian Railway (Carstairs and Dolphinton Branch) Act 1863	26 & 27 Vict. c. xxiv	11 May 1863
An Act to enable the Caledonian Railway Company to make a Branch Railway from Carstairs to join the Leadburn, Linton, and Dolphinton Railway; and for other Purposes.
Caledonian Railway (Improvements) Act 1863	26 & 27 Vict. c. xxv	11 May 1863
An Act for enabling the Caledonian Railway Company to widen and improve certain Portions of their Lesmahagow Branches; to make a Deviation and Extension in connexion therewith; to substitute Bridges for certain level Crossings on their Main Line and on the Glasgow, Barrhead, and Neilson Direct Railway; to alter certain Roads, improve and enlarge certain Stations and other Works, and acquire additional Lands; and for other Purposes.
Busby Railway Act 1863	26 & 27 Vict. c. xxvi	11 May 1863
An Act for making a Railway from the Glasgow, Barrhead, and Neilson Direct Railway to Busby, with a Branch to Busby Print Works, in the Counties of Renfrew and Lanark; and for other Purposes.
Penzance and St. Just Turnpike Roads Act 1863	26 & 27 Vict. c. xxvii	11 May 1863
An Act for making a Turnpike Road from Penzance to Saint Just in Penrith in the County of Cornwall, with Branches, and for the Adoption, Alteration, and Improvement, for the Purposes thereof, of certain public Highways; and for other Purposes.
Cleeve and Evesham Road Act 1863	26 & 27 Vict. c. xxviii	11 May 1863
An Act to continue the Cleeve and Evesham Turnpike Trust in the County of Gloucester, and for other Purposes.
Hamilton Waterworks Amendment Act 1863	26 & 27 Vict. c. xxix	11 May 1863
An Act to amend "The Hamilton Waterworks Act, 1854," (Note: Hamilton Waterworks Act 1854 (17 & 18 Vict. c. xc)) and to authorize the raising of a further Sum of Money; and for other Purposes.
Flint, Holywell and Mostyn Roads Act 1863 (repealed)	26 & 27 Vict. c. xxx	11 May 1863
An Act for more effectually repairing and improving the several Roads comprised in the Flint, Holywell, and Mostyn Districts of Roads; and for reviving and extending the Powers for the Construction of certain new Roads; and for other Purposes. (Repealed by Annual Turnpike Acts Continuance Act 1884 (47 & 48 Vict. c. 52))
Cleveland Railway Act 1863	26 & 27 Vict. c. xxxi	11 May 1863
An Act to extend the Time for completing the Cleveland Railway; to authorize the Cleveland Railway Company to raise further Sums of Money, and the West Hartlepool Harbour and Railway Company to hold additional Shares; and for other Purposes.
Inverness and Aberdeen Junction Railway (Bonar Bridge Extension) Act 1863 or the Ross-shire Railway Extension Act 1863 (repealed)	26 & 27 Vict. c. xxxii	11 May 1863
An Act to enable the Inverness and Aberdeen Junction Railway Company to extend their Railway from Invergordon in the County of Ross to Tain and Bonar Bridge in the same County; and for other Purposes. (Repealed by Highland Railway Act 1865 (28 & 29 Vict. c. clxviii))
Rugby Waterworks Act 1863	26 & 27 Vict. c. xxxiii	11 May 1863
An Act to enable the Local Board of Health for the District of Rugby in the County of Warwick to provide a better Supply of Water for the Inhabitants of that District and its Neighbourhood; and for other Purposes.
Newcastle and Gateshead Waterworks Act 1863	26 & 27 Vict. c. xxxiv	11 May 1863
An Act for better supplying with Water the Towns of Newcastle-upon-Tyne and Gateshead, and the Neighbourhood thereof, and for amending and consolidating the Provisions of the Acts relating to the Whittle Dean Water Company.
Great Grimsby Waterworks Act 1863 (repealed)	26 & 27 Vict. c. xxxv	11 May 1863
An Act for more effectually supplying Water to the Town of Great Grimsby, and several Places near thereto. (Repealed by Grimsby Corporation (Grimsby, Cleethorpes and District Water, &c.) Act 1937 (1 Edw. 8 & 1 Geo. 6. c. xli))
Accrington Gas and Waterworks Act 1863	26 & 27 Vict. c. xxxvi	8 June 1863
An Act to authorize the Accrington Gas and Water Works Company to extend their Gasworks and Waterworks, and their Limits of Supply; to raise additional Monies; and for other Purposes.
Surrey Consumers Gas Company's Act 1863	26 & 27 Vict. c. xxxvii	8 June 1863
An Act to authorize the Surrey Consumers Gas Company to raise a further Sum of Money.
Caledonian Railway (Granton Branches) Act 1863	26 & 27 Vict. c. xxxviii	8 June 1863
An Act for more completely merging in the Undertaking of the Caledonian Railway Company the Railways known as the Granton Branches, and for raising Money to widen and improve the same, and for other Purposes.
Desford Road Act 1863	26 & 27 Vict. c. xxxix	8 June 1863
An Act for continuing the Term and amending and extending the Provisions of the Act (Note: Roads in Parishes of Desford and Newbold (Leicestershire) Act 1831 (1 Will. 4. c. xxxviii)) relating to the Desford Turnpike Road, being the Road branching out of the Leicester and Welford Road at Foston Lane to the Road leading from Hinckley to Ashby-de-la-Zouch at Osbaston Toll Gate in the County of Leicester.
Newtown and Machynlleth Railway Act 1863	26 & 27 Vict. c. xl	8 June 1863
An Act for enabling the Newtown and Machynlleth Railway Company to raise additional Capital; and for other Purposes.
Nottingham Gas Amendment Act 1863 (repealed)	26 & 27 Vict. c. xli	8 June 1863
An Act to amend the Acts relating to the Nottingham Gas Company, and to enable that Company to acquire additional Lands; and for other Purposes. (Repealed by Statute Law (Repeals) Act 1995 (c. 44))
Cockermouth and Workington Railway Act 1863	26 & 27 Vict. c. xlii	8 June 1863
An Act for enabling the Cockermouth and Workington Railway Company to execute further Works; and for amending the Acts relating to their Railway.
Landport and Southsea Tramway Act 1863	26 & 27 Vict. c. xliii	8 June 1863
An Act for making a Tramway in the Parish of Portsea in the County of Southampton, and for other Purposes.
Maidstone Waterworks Act 1863	26 & 27 Vict. c. xliv	8 June 1863
An Act for extending the Limits within which the Maidstone Waterworks Company may supply Water, and for authorizing them to provide additional Works and to raise further Monies; and for other Purposes.
Dungarvan Harbour, Markets and Improvement Act 1863	26 & 27 Vict. c. xlv	8 June 1863
An Act for the Improvement of the Port and Harbour of Dungarvan; for vesting the Markets of that Town in the Town Commissioners of Dungarvan, and for enabling the said Commissioners to extend and regulate the same; for the Transfer from the Grand Jury of the County of Waterford to the said Commissioners of the Management of the Roads and Bridges in the said Town; for the Improvement of the said Town; and for other Purposes.
Queen's Road, Battersea, Extension Act 1863	26 & 27 Vict. c. xlvi	8 June 1863
An Act to authorize the Construction of a new public Road from Battersea to Clapham, and for other Purposes.
Greenock and Wemyss Bay Railway Extension Act 1863	26 & 27 Vict. c. xlvii	8 June 1863
An Act for making an Extension of the Greenock and Wemyss Bay Railway in the County of Renfrew, and a Pier in connexion therewith, in lieu of the Pier authorized by "The Greenock and Wemyss Bay Railway Act, 1862," (Note: Greenock and Wemyss Bay Railway Act 1862 (25 & 26 Vict. c. clx)) and for other Purposes.
Marshland Smeeth and Fen District Act 1863	26 & 27 Vict. c. xlviii	8 June 1863
An Act for making further Provision for the Drainage of the Marshland Smeeth and Fen District in the Country of Marshland in the County of Norfolk, and for other Purposes.
Wear Navigation and Sunderland Dock Act 1863 (repealed)	26 & 27 Vict. c. xlix	8 June 1863
An Act to amend the Acts relating to the Wear Navigation and Sunderland Docks, and to authorize the making of additional Works, and for other Purposes. (Repealed by Wear Navigation and Sunderland Dock (Consolidation and Amendment) Act 1922 (12 & 13 Geo. 5. c. lxxxiv))
Cowes and Newport Railway Act 1863	26 & 27 Vict. c. l	8 June 1863
An Act for authorizing the Cowes and Newport Railway Company to raise further Monies.
Cheltenham Roads Act 1863 (repealed)	26 & 27 Vict. c. li	8 June 1863
An Act to continue the Cheltenham Turnpike Trust in the County of Gloucester, and for other Purposes. (Repealed by Annual Turnpike Acts Continuance Act 1878 (41 & 42 Vict. c. 62))
Sowerby Bridge Local Board Act 1863 (repealed)	26 & 27 Vict. c. lii	8 June 1863
An Act for extending the District of the Local Board of Health for the District of Sowerby Bridge in the West Riding of the County of York; to enable them to contract for Water and supply the District therewith; to amend the Acts relating to the District; and for other Purposes. (Repealed by West Yorkshire Act 1980 (c. xiv))
Loughborough, Ashby-de-la-Zouche and Rempstone Road Act 1863 (repealed)	26 & 27 Vict. c. liii	8 June 1863
An Act for repairing the Road leading from Burleigh Bridge in Loughborough to Ashby-de-la-Zouch in the County of Leicester, and also the Road branching out of the said Road at Coleorton Church to Rempstone in the Counties of Leicester and Nottingham. (Repealed by Annual Turnpike Acts Continuance Act 1884 (47 & 48 Vict. c. 52))
Mersey Docks (North Wall) Act 1863	26 & 27 Vict. c. liv	8 June 1863
An Act to enable the Mersey Docks and Harbour Board to extend the North River Wall at Liverpool, and to raise a further Sum of Money; and for other Purposes.
Mercantile Marine Service Association Act 1863	26 & 27 Vict. c. lv	8 June 1863
An Act to incorporate the Mercantile Marine Service Association of Liverpool, and to enable them the better to carry on their beneficial Designs.
Cork and Kinsale Junction Railway Act 1863	26 & 27 Vict. c. lvi	8 June 1863
An Act to enable the Cork and Kinsale Junction Railway Company to raise additional Money, and to contribute to an Hotel at Kinsale; and for other Purposes.
Gravesend Gas Act 1863	26 & 27 Vict. c. lvii	8 June 1863
An Act for more effectually lighting with Gas the Parishes of Gravesend, Milton, and Northfleet, in the County of Kent.
Inverness and Perth Junction and Perth and Dunkeld Railways Amalgamation Act 1863	26 & 27 Vict. c. lviii	8 June 1863
An Act for the Amalgamation of the Perth and Dunkeld Railway Company with the Inverness and Perth Junction Railway Company.
Abergavenny Roads Act 1863	26 & 27 Vict. c. lix	8 June 1863
An Act to continue the Abergavenny Turnpike Trust, excepting certain Roads, and for other Purposes.
Bristol and Exeter Railway Act 1863	26 & 27 Vict. c. lx	8 June 1863
An Act to enable the Bristol and Exeter Railway Company to purchase additional Lands, and raise further Sums of Money; to confer Powers with respect to the West Somerset and Chard and Taunton Railways, and other Undertakings; to alter Rates and Charges; to amend the Acts relating to the Company; and for other Purposes.
Inverness and Perth Junction Railway (Deviations) Act 1863 (repealed)	26 & 27 Vict. c. lxi	8 June 1863
An Act to enable the Inverness and Perth Junction Railway Company to make Deviations of their authorized Line of Railway, and for other Purposes. (Repealed by Highland Railway Act 1865 (28 & 29 Vict. c. clxviii))
Blackfriars Bridge Act 1863	26 & 27 Vict. c. lxii	8 June 1863
An Act to authorize the Mayor and Commonalty and Citizens of the City of London to rebuild Blackfriars Bridge.
Rixton and Warburton Bridge Act 1863	26 & 27 Vict. c. lxiii	8 June 1863
An Act for the making and maintaining of a Bridge over the River Mersey, to be called "Rixton and Warburton Bridge," with Roads thereto, and for other Purposes.
Whitehaven, Cleator and Egremont Railway Act 1863	26 & 27 Vict. c. lxiv	8 June 1863
An Act to enable the Whitehaven, Cleator, and Egremont Railway Company to extend their Railway from Lamplugh to join the Cockermouth and Workington Railway in the County of Cumberland; to divert and alter a Portion of the Frizington Branch Railway at Cleator Moor; to raise further Capital; and for other Purposes.
Fochabers and Garmouth Railway Act 1863	26 & 27 Vict. c. lxv	8 June 1863
An Act for making a Railway from Fochabers to Garmouth, and for other Purposes.
Londonderry Railway (Seaham to Sunderland) Act 1863 or the Londonderry (Seaham to Sunderland) Railway Act 1863	26 & 27 Vict. c. lxvi	8 June 1863
An Act for the Regulation and Management of certain Railways between Seaham and Sunderland in the County of Durham, the Construction of additional Railways in connexion therewith, the Acquisition of the Lands over which the same are or are to be constructed, and for other Purposes.
Isle of Purbeck Railway Act 1863	26 & 27 Vict. c. lxvii	22 June 1863
An Act for making a Railway from Wareham to Swanage in the County of Dorset, and for other Purposes.
Manchester Corporation Waterworks Act 1863	26 & 27 Vict. c. lxviii	22 June 1863
An Act for enabling the Mayor, Aldermen, and Citizens of the City of Manchester to construct new Works and acquire additional Lands in connexion with their Waterworks; to extend their Limits of Supply; to improve Piccadilly in Manchester; and for other Purposes.
London, Tilbury and Southend Railway Act 1863	26 & 27 Vict. c. lxix	22 June 1863
An Act to authorize Arrangements between the London, Tilbury, and Southend Railway Company, and the Lessees of their Undertaking, and the Eastern Counties and London and Blackwall Railway Companies, with reference to the Lease and Working of the London, Tilbury, and Southend Railway; and for other Purposes.
Southampton and Netley Railway Act 1863	26 & 27 Vict. c. lxx	22 June 1863
An Act for enabling the Southampton and Netley Railway Company to make a Deviation of their authorized Line of Railway; and for other Purposes.
Rusthall Manor Act 1863	26 & 27 Vict. c. lxxi	22 June 1863
An Act for the better Regulation of the Commons of the Manor of Rusthall, and the Rights therein of the Freehold Tenants of the Manor, and for other Purposes.
Pembroke Township Act 1863	26 & 27 Vict. c. lxxii	22 June 1863
An Act for the Improvement of Pembroke Township, comprising Baggotrath, Donnybrook, Sandymount, Ringsend, and Irishtown, in the Barony of Dublin and County of Dublin.
Exeter Gaol Act 1863 (repealed)	26 & 27 Vict. c. lxxiii	22 June 1863
An Act for the Committal of Prisoners from the City and County of the City of Exeter to the Gaol and House of Correction for the County of Devon; and for the Sale and Disposal of the present Gaol and House of Correction for the City and County of the City of Exeter and the Land belonging thereto; and for other Purposes. (Repealed by Statute Law (Repeals) Act 2008 (c. 12))
Midland Railway (Extension to London) Act 1863	26 & 27 Vict. c. lxxiv	22 June 1863
An Act for the Construction by the Midland Railway Company of a new Line of Railway between London and Bedford, with Branches therefrom; and for other Purposes.
Penarth Harbour, Dock and Railway Leasing Act 1863	26 & 27 Vict. c. lxxv	22 June 1863
An Act for a Lease of the Undertaking of the Penarth Harbour, Dock, and Railway Company to the Taff Vale Railway Company, and for other Purposes.
County Mayo Grand Jury Cess Act 1863	26 & 27 Vict. c. lxxvi	22 June 1863
An Act to enable the Grand Jury of the County of Mayo to present and recover Arrears of Grand Jury Cess upon said County, and upon certain Baronies thereof, in order to the Payment of Sums due to Contractors and others.
Central Wales Extension Railway Act 1863	26 & 27 Vict. c. lxxvii	22 June 1863
An Act for enabling the Central Wales Extension Railway Company to raise additional Capital; to make working and other Agreements with the London and North-western Railway Company; and for other Purposes.
Dublin Corporation Waterworks Amendment Act 1863	26 & 27 Vict. c. lxxviii	22 June 1863
An Act to enable the Lord Mayor, Aldermen, and Burgesses of Dublin to abandon a Portion of the Works authorized by "The Dublin Corporation Waterworks Act, 1861," (Note: Dublin Corporation Waterworks Act 1861 (24 & 25 Vict. c. clxxii)) and to construct and maintain other Works; and for other Purposes.
Central Wales Railway Act 1863	26 & 27 Vict. c. lxxix	22 June 1863
An Act for the Amalgamation of the Knighton and the Central Wales Railway Companies; for authorizing Arrangements between those Companies, or either of them, and the London and North-western Railway Company; and for other Purposes.
Mid Wales Railway (Llangurig Branch, &c.) Act 1863	26 & 27 Vict. c. lxxx	22 June 1863
An Act to enable the Mid-Wales Railway Company to make a Branch Railway from the Mid-Wales Railway in the Parish of Saint Harmon in the County of Radnor to the Manchester and Milford Railway in the Parish of Llangurig in the County of Montgomery, and to enable the said Company to use the Brecon and Merthyr Junction Railways; and for other Purposes.
Tramore Embankment Act 1863	26 & 27 Vict. c. lxxxi	22 June 1863
An Act to confer further Powers for embanking and reclaiming from the Sea the Estuary or Back Strand of Tramore in the County of Waterford; and to amend "The Tramore Embankment Act, 1852," (Note: Tramore Embankment Act 1852 (15 & 16 Vict. c. cxi)) and "The Tramore Embankment Act, 1858." (Note: Tramore Embankment Amendment Act 1858 (21 & 22 Vict. c. liv))
Furness and Midland Railway Act 1863	26 & 27 Vict. c. lxxxii	22 June 1863
An Act to empower the Furness Railway Company and the Midland Railway Company to construct a Railway to be called "The Furness and Midland Railway;" and for other Purposes.
Saffron Walden Railway Extension Act 1863	26 & 27 Vict. c. lxxxiii	22 June 1863
An Act for authorizing the Saffron Walden Railway Company to make and maintain Railways to the Great Eastern Railway at Bartlow; to raise further Monies; and for other Purposes.
Horsey Island Reclamation Act 1863	26 & 27 Vict. c. lxxxiv	22 June 1863
An Act for the Reclamation from the Sea of Waste Lands subject to be overflowed by the Tide near to Horsey Island on the Coast of Essex.
Bishops Waltham Railway Act 1863	26 & 27 Vict. c. lxxxv	22 June 1863
An Act to enable the Bishops Waltham Railway Company to increase their Capital, and for other Purposes.
Dublin, Wicklow and Wexford Railway Act 1863	26 & 27 Vict. c. lxxxvi	22 June 1863
An Act to enable the Dublin, Wicklow, and Wexford Railway Company to purchase Lands in the City and County of Dublin; to construct a Branch Railway in the County of Wicklow; to raise additional Capital; and for other Purposes.
Stockport District Waterworks Act 1863 (repealed)	26 & 27 Vict. c. lxxxvii	22 June 1863
An Act for authorizing the Stockport District Waterworks Company to acquire existing Waterworks within their District, and to raise further Monies; and for other Purposes. (Repealed by Stockport and District Water Board Order 1962 (SI 1962/467))
Ware, Hadham and Buntingford Railway Act 1863	26 & 27 Vict. c. lxxxviii	22 June 1863
An Act to enable the Ware, Hadham, and Buntingford Railway Company to raise additional Capital; and for other Purposes.
Furness Railway and Barrow Harbour Act 1863	26 & 27 Vict. c. lxxxix	22 June 1863
An Act for vesting the Harbour of Barrow in the County Palatine of Lancaster in the Furness Railway Company; for enabling the said Company to construct a Dock and other Works at Barrow, and to raise further Capital; and for other Purposes.
South Western Railway Act 1863	26 & 27 Vict. c. xc	22 June 1863
An Act for authorizing the Amalgamation of the Undertakings of divers Railway Companies with the Undertaking of the London and South-western Railway Company; and divers Arrangements between that Company and other Companies and Bodies; and for other Purposes.
Elsecar, Wentworth and Hoyland Gas Act 1863 (repealed)	26 & 27 Vict. c. xci	22 June 1863
An Act for supplying with Gas the Villages of Elsecar, Wentworth, and Hoyland, and Parts adjacent, in the West Riding of the County of York. (Repealed by Sheffield Gas Order 1932 (SR&O 1932/532))
Coventry Market House Act 1863 (repealed)	26 & 27 Vict. c. xcii	29 June 1863
An Act to authorize the Mayor, Aldermen, and Citizens of the City of Coventry in the County of Warwick to erect a Market House in the said City. (Repealed by West Midlands County Council Act 1980 (c. xi))
Norwich Poor Act 1863 (repealed)	26 & 27 Vict. c. xciii	29 June 1863
An Act for making better Provision for the Management and Relief of the Poor in the City of Norwich and County of the same City. (Repealed by Norwich Corporation Act 1970 (c. xxvii))
Skipton Gas Act 1863	26 & 27 Vict. c. xciv	29 June 1863
An Act for incorporating the Skipton Gaslight and Coke Company, and for conferring upon them further Powers for the Supply of Gas to the Township of Skipton and certain neighbouring Townships in the West Riding of the County of York.
Stourbridge Railway (Capital) Act 1863	26 & 27 Vict. c. xcv	29 June 1863
An Act for authorizing the Stourbridge Railway Company to raise further Monies; and for other Purposes.
Oswestry and Newtown Railway Act 1863	26 & 27 Vict. c. xcvi	29 June 1863
An Act for authorizing the Oswestry and Newtown Railway Company to make a Branch to Aberbechan, and to raise additional Capital; and for other Purposes.
Shrewsbury and Welchpool Railway (Capital) Act 1863 or the Shrewsbury and Welshpool Railway (Capital) Act 1863	26 & 27 Vict. c. xcvii	29 June 1863
An Act to authorize the Shrewsbury and Welchpool Railway Company to raise a further Sum of Money; and for other Purposes.
Ashbourne, Sudbury and Yoxhall Bridge, and Uttoxeter and Callingwood Plain Turnpike Road Act 1863	26 & 27 Vict. c. xcviii	29 June 1863
An Act to repeal an Act passed in the Eleventh Year of the Reign of His late Majesty King George the Fourth, (Note: Ashbourne, Hatton Moor, Uttoxeter and Hadley Plain Roads Act 1830 (11 Geo. 4 & 1 Will. 4. c. lxxxix)) intituled "An Act for repairing, altering, and improving the Roads from Ashbourne to Sudbury, and from Sudbury to Yoxall Bridge, and from Hatton Moor to Tutbury, and from Uttoxeter to or near the Village of Draycott-in-the-Clay, and from Hadley Plain on the same late Forest or Chase of Needwood to Callingwood Plain on the same late Forest or Chase; and to make other Provisions in lieu thereof.
Cork and Youghal Railway Act 1863	26 & 27 Vict. c. xcix	29 June 1863
An Act with respect to the Capital of the Cork and Youghal Railway Company, and to enable that Company to transfer their Undertaking.
River Bann Navigation Act 1863	26 & 27 Vict. c. c	29 June 1863
An Act for the Improvement by the Coleraine Town Commissioners of the Navigation of the River Bann; and for other Purposes.
St. Luke's (Middlesex) Workhouse and Vestry Hall Act 1863 (repealed)	26 & 27 Vict. c. ci	29 June 1863
An Act to authorize Arrangements between the Vestry and Guardians of the Poor of the Parish of Saint Luke in the County of Middlesex for the Erection and Use of a Vestry Hall and Offices, to amend the Acts relating to such Workhouse and Parish, and for other Purposes. (Repealed by London Government (Borough of Finsbury) Order in Council 1901 (SR&O 1901/266))
Itchen Floating Bridge Act 1863 (repealed)	26 & 27 Vict. c. cii	29 June 1863
An Act for authorizing the Company of Proprietors of the Southampton and Itchen Floating Bridge and Roads to improve their present Works, and to establish a new Floating Jetty, and to raise further Monies; and for other Purposes. (Repealed by Southampton Corporation Act 1973 (c. xix))
Llanelly Railway and Dock Act 1863	26 & 27 Vict. c. ciii	29 June 1863
An Act to confer further Powers upon the Llanelly Railway and Dock Company.
Buckley Railway Act 1863	26 & 27 Vict. c. civ	29 June 1863
An Act to enable the Buckley Railway Company to raise a further Sum of Money; and for other Purposes.
Launceston and South Devon Railway Act 1863	26 & 27 Vict. c. cv	29 June 1863
An Act to enable the Launceston and South Devon Railway Company to make a Deviation of their authorized Line of Railway; and for other Purposes.
Birkenhead Improvement Commissioners Act 1863	26 & 27 Vict. c. cvi	29 June 1863
An Act to confer further Powers upon the Birkenhead Improvement Commissioners, and to make Provisions with respect to their Mortgage Debts, and to enable them to raise further Monies; and for other Purposes.
Bristol and Portishead Pier and Railway Act 1863	26 & 27 Vict. c. cvii	29 June 1863
An Act to authorize the Construction of a Pier at Portbury in the County of Somerset, and of a Railway therefrom to the Bristol and Exeter Railway near Bristol, with a Branch Railway to Portishead; and for other Purposes.
Cockermouth, Keswick and Penrith Railway Act 1863	26 & 27 Vict. c. cviii	29 June 1863
An Act to confer further Powers on the Cockermouth, Keswick, and Penrith Railway Company, in relation to their Undertaking; to enable the London and North-western and the Stockton and Darlington Railway Companies to subscribe thereto; and for other Purposes relating thereto, and to the Cockermouth and Workington Railway.
Andover and Redbridge and South Western Railways Act 1863	26 & 27 Vict. c. cix	29 June 1863
An Act for authorizing the making and maintaining of Lines of Railway to connect the Andover and Redbridge Railway with the London and South-western Railway, and for the Amalgamation of the Andover and Redbridge Railway with the London and South-western Railway; and for other Purposes.
Newport Pagnell Railway Act 1863	26 & 27 Vict. c. cx	29 June 1863
An Act to incorporate a Company for making a Railway from the London and North-western Railway to Newport Pagnell, with Powers to purchase the Newport Pagnell Canal.
Tranmere Docks Act 1863	26 & 27 Vict. c. cxi	29 June 1863
An Act to authorize the Construction of Docks at Tranmere Pool in the County of Chester.
Great Yarmouth Gas Act 1863	26 & 27 Vict. c. cxii	29 June 1863
An Act to incorporate the Great Yarmouth Gas Company, and make further Provision for lighting the Town of Great Yarmouth and certain neighbouring Places with Gas.
Great Western Railway (West Midland Amalgamation) Act 1863	26 & 27 Vict. c. cxiii	13 July 1863
An Act for the Amalgamation of the West Midland Railway Company with the Great Western Railway Company; and for other Purposes.
Evesham and Redditch Railway Act 1863	26 & 27 Vict. c. cxiv	13 July 1863
An Act for making a Railway from the Ashchurch and Evesham Railway of the Midland Railway Company, in the Parish of Saint Lawrence, Evesham, in the County of Worcester, to the Redditch Railway at Redditch, with a Branch to the West Midland Railway; and for other Purposes.
Charing Cross Railway Act 1863	26 & 27 Vict. c. cxv	13 July 1863
An Act for regulating the Capital and Debenture Debt of the Charing Cross Railway Company; and for authorizing the Amalgamation of that Company with the South-eastern Railway Company; and for other Purposes.
Letterkenny Railway Act 1863	26 & 27 Vict. c. cxvi	13 July 1863
An Act to alter the Line of the Letterkenny Railway in the County of Donegal; to extend and enlarge the Powers of the Act relating to that Railway; (Note: Letterkenny Railway Act 1860 (23 & 24 Vict. c. xcix)) and to authorize certain Arrangements with the Londonderry and Lough Swilly Railway Company; and for other Purposes.
Rotherham and Kimberworth Local Board of Health Act 1863	26 & 27 Vict. c. cxvii	13 July 1863
An Act for enabling the Local Board of Health for the District of Rotherham and Kimberworth in the West Riding of the County of York to construct and maintain an improved System of Waterworks for the Supply of the District and adjacent Places with Water; and for enabling the Board to purchase the existing Markets and Fairs within the District, and to establish new Markets and Fairs within the District, and to purchase and extinguish Dues and Duties paid and collected within the Town of Rotherham; and for amending Acts relating to the District; and for other Purposes.
Seaton and Beer Railway Act 1863	26 & 27 Vict. c. cxviii	13 July 1863
An Act for making a Railway from the London and South-western Railway to Seaton, otherwise Seaton-with-Beer in the County of Devon; and for other Purposes.
Southampton Harbour Act 1863	26 & 27 Vict. c. cxix	13 July 1863
An Act for the Consolidation of the Acts relating to the Port and Harbour of the Town and County of Southampton, and of the Acts relating to the Southampton Pier, and for constituting One united Body or Harbour Board for such Port, Harbour, and Pier, with further Powers.
Vale of Neath Railway Act 1863	26 & 27 Vict. c. cxx	13 July 1863
An Act for the Amalgamation of the Swansea and Neath Railway Company with the Vale of Neath Railway Company, and for authorizing the Vale of Neath Railway Company to make a further Line of Railway, and to raise further Monies; and for other Purposes.
Blackrock Township Act 1863	26 & 27 Vict. c. cxxi	13 July 1863
An Act for the Improvement of Blackrock, Monkstown, and Booterstown in the Baronies of Dublin and Rathdown and County of Dublin.
North-eastern and Stockton and Darlington Railways Amalgamation Act 1863	26 & 27 Vict. c. cxxii	13 July 1863
An Act for the Amalgamation of the Stockton and Darlington Railway Company with the North-eastern Railway Company; and for other Purposes.
Belfast, Holywood and Bangor Railway Act 1863	26 & 27 Vict. c. cxxiii	13 July 1863
An Act to grant further Powers to the Belfast, Holywood, and Bangor Railway Company, and to extend the Time for the Completion of their Undertaking; to authorize Contributions towards a Quay and other Works at Bangor; and for other Purposes.
Devon Valley Railway Act 1863	26 & 27 Vict. c. cxxiv	13 July 1863
An Act to enable the Devon Valley Railway Company to create Preference Shares; to reduce the Capital of the Company; and for other Purposes.
Newcastle-upon-Tyne and Carlisle Road (within Northumberland) Act 1863 (repealed)	26 & 27 Vict. c. cxxv	13 July 1863
An Act to create a further Term in so much of the Newcastle-upon-Tyne and Carlisle Turnpike Road as is within the County of Northumberland; to repeal, amend, and extend the Powers of the Act relating to the said Road; and for other Purposes. (Repealed by Annual Turnpike Acts Continuance Act 1878 (41 & 42 Vict. c. 62))
Merthyr, Tredegar and Abergavenny Railway Act 1863	26 & 27 Vict. c. cxxvi	13 July 1863
An Act to enable the Merthyr, Tredegar, and Abergavenny Railway Company to raise an additional Sum of Money, and to execute further Works; and for other Purposes.
Leominster and Kington Railway Act 1863	26 & 27 Vict. c. cxxvii	13 July 1863
An Act to authorize the Leominster and Kington Railway Company to enter into Working Arrangements with, and to lease or sell their Railway to the West Midland Railway Company; and for other Purposes.
Anglesey Central Railway Act 1863	26 & 27 Vict. c. cxxviii	13 July 1863
An Act to authorize the Construction of a Railway in the County of Anglesey, to be called "The Anglesey Central Railway;" and for other Purposes.
Okehampton Railway Act 1863	26 & 27 Vict. c. cxxix	13 July 1863
An Act for authorizing the Okehampton Railway Company to extend their Railway from Okehampton to the Launceston and South Devon Railway near Lidford [Lydford], and to raise further Monies; and for other Purposes.
Neath and Brecon Railway Act 1863	26 & 27 Vict. c. cxxx	13 July 1863
An Act to enable the Dulas Valley Mineral Railway Company to deviate Portions of their authorized Line; to make a Railway to Brecon; to change the Name of the Company; and for other Purposes.
Watford and Rickmansworth Railway (Sale) Act 1863	26 & 27 Vict. c. cxxxi	13 July 1863
An Act to grant further Powers to the Watford and Rickmansworth Railway Company.
Stonehouse and Nailsworth Railway Act 1863	26 & 27 Vict. c. cxxxii	13 July 1863
An Act for making a Railway from the Bristol and Birmingham Line of the Midland Railway at Stonehouse to Nailsworth in the County of Gloucester.
Athenry and Ennis Junction Railway Act 1863	26 & 27 Vict. c. cxxxiii	13 July 1863
An Act to extend the Time for the Completion of the Athenry and Ennis Junction Railway; and for other Purposes.
Ringwood, Christchurch and Bournemouth Railway Act 1863	26 & 27 Vict. c. cxxxiv	13 July 1863
An Act to empower the Ringwood, Christchurch, and Bournemouth Railway Company to extend their Railway to Bournemouth; and for other Purposes.
Wakefield and Aberford Turnpike Road Act 1863 (repealed)	26 & 27 Vict. c. cxxxv	13 July 1863
An Act to extend the Term and amend the Provisions of the Act (Note: Wakefield and Aberford Road Act 1831 (1 Will. 4. c. xxxv)) relating to the Turnpike Road from Wakefield to Aberford in the County of York. (Repealed by Annual Turnpike Acts Continuance Act 1882 (45 & 46 Vict. c. 52))
West Midland Railway Act 1863	26 & 27 Vict. c. cxxxvi	13 July 1863
An Act to grant further Powers to the West Midland Railway Company, and to enable them to make a Branch Railway in the County of Glamorgan; and for other Purposes.
London, Brighton, and South Coast Railway (Dorking to Leatherhead) Act 1863	26 & 27 Vict. c. cxxxvii	13 July 1863
An Act to enable the London, Brighton, and South Coast Railway Company to make a Railway from Dorking to Leatherhead; and for other Purposes.
Mid Kent Railway Act 1863	26 & 27 Vict. c. cxxxviii	13 July 1863
An Act to authorize the Mid-Kent Railway Company to raise a further Sum of Money.
Ogmore Valley Railways Act 1863	26 & 27 Vict. c. cxxxix	13 July 1863
An Act to authorize the Construction of Railways in Glamorganshire, to be called "The Ogmore Valley Railways."
Lands Improvement Company's Amendment Act 1863	26 & 27 Vict. c. cxl	13 July 1863
An Act to alter and amend the Acts relating to the Lands Improvement Company.
Aberystwith and Welsh Coast Railway Act 1863 or the Aberystwyth and Welsh Coast Railway Act 1863	26 & 27 Vict. c. cxli	13 July 1863
An Act for authorizing the Aberystwith and Welsh Coast Railway Company to make and maintain further Lines of Railway and other Works, and to make Arrangements with other Companies, and to raise further Monies; and for other Purposes.
London, Brighton and South Coast Railway (Extensions, &c.) Act 1863	26 & 27 Vict. c. cxlii	13 July 1863
An Act to enable the London, Brighton, and South Coast Railway Company to make Extensions and Alterations of their Railways authorized by "The London, Brighton, and South Coast Railway (New Lines) Act, 1862," (Note: London, Brighton and South Coast Railway (New Lines) Act 1862 (25 & 26 Vict. c. lxxviii)) and other Works; and for other Purposes.
Tendring Hundred Railway Extension Act 1863	26 & 27 Vict. c. cxliii	13 July 1863
An Act to authorize the Tendring Hundred Railway Company to extend their Railway to Weeley and Walton in Essex.
Tees Conservancy Act 1863	26 & 27 Vict. c. cxliv	13 July 1863
An Act to enable the Tees Conservancy Commissioners to purchase additional Lands; to alter existing and impose new Tolls, Rates, and Duties; to confer additional Powers for raising Money; to repeal and amend the existing Acts of the Commissioners; to confer additional Powers; and for other Purposes.
West Shropshire Mineral Railway Act 1863	26 & 27 Vict. c. cxlv	13 July 1863
An Act to enable the West Shropshire Mineral Railway Company to make a Deviation and a new Railway, and to make Agreements with other Companies; and for other Purposes.
South Yorkshire Railway Act 1863	26 & 27 Vict. c. cxlvi	13 July 1863
An Act to enable the South Yorkshire Railway and River Dun Company to alter their authorized Line; to purchase the Barnsley Coal Railway; and for other Purposes relating to the same Company.
Great Northern Railway (Cheshire Lines) Act 1863	26 & 27 Vict. c. cxlvii	13 July 1863
An Act to grant to the Great Northern Railway Company certain Powers with respect to the Stockport and Woodley Junction, Cheshire Midland, Stockport, Timperley, and Altrincham Junction, West Cheshire, and Manchester South Junction and Altrincham Railways; and for other Purposes.
Glasgow and South Western and Ayr and Maybole Railways Act 1863	26 & 27 Vict. c. cxlviii	13 July 1863
An Act to enable the Glasgow and South-western Railway Company to use the Railway of the Ayr and Maybole Junction Railway Company, and for other Purposes relating to that Railway.
Scottish Central Railway (Plean Branches) Act 1863	26 & 27 Vict. c. cxlix	13 July 1863
An Act to enable the Scottish Central Railway Company to make Branches to Plean Mineral Fields, and for other Purposes.
Standedge and Oldham Road Act 1863	26 & 27 Vict. c. cl	13 July 1863
An Act to repeal an Act passed in the Seventh and Eighth Years of the Reign of His Majesty King George the Fourth, (Note: Standedge and Oldham Road Act 1827 (7 & 8 Geo. 4. c. lxiv)) intituled "An Act for more effectually repairing and improving the Road from Standedge in Saddleworth in the County of York to Oldham in the County of Lancaster, and other Roads in the said County of York, and for making and maintaining Two new Branches to communicate therewith," and granting more effectual Powers in lieu thereof; and for other Purposes.
Great Western Railway (Branch at Great Bridge) Act 1863	26 & 27 Vict. c. cli	13 July 1863
An Act for enabling the Great Western Railway Company to construct a Railway from their Birmingham, Wolverhampton, and Dudley Line, in the Parish of West Bromwich, to the South Staffordshire Railway in the Parish of Tipton in the County of Stafford; and for other Purposes.
Hemel Hempsted and London and North Western Railway Act 1863	26 & 27 Vict. c. clii	13 July 1863
An Act for making a Railway from the London and North-western Railway at Boxmoor to Hemel Hempsted, in the County of Hertford; and for other Purposes.
Portadown, Dungannon and Omagh Junction Railway Act 1863	26 & 27 Vict. c. cliii	13 July 1863
An Act to grant further Powers to the Portadown, Dungannon, and Omagh Junction Railway Company; to amend the Acts relating to the Company; and for other Purposes.
West Hartlepool Harbour and Railway (Capital) Act 1863	26 & 27 Vict. c. cliv	13 July 1863
An Act for regulating the Debenture Debt and Capital of the West Hartlepool Harbour and Railway Company; and for other Purposes.
Tamworth and Harrington Bridge Roads Act 1863 (repealed)	26 & 27 Vict. c. clv	13 July 1863
An Act to repeal an Act passed in the Fourth Year of the Reign of His Majesty King George the Fourth, (Note: Roads from Tamworth and from Harrington Bridge Act 1823 (4 Geo. 4. c. cxxii)) intituled "An Act for repairing the Roads from the Borough of Tamworth in the Counties of Stafford and Warwick to the Town of Ashby-de-la-Zouch in the County of Leicester, and from Harrington Bridge (heretofore Sawley Ferry) in the said County of Leicester to a Turnpike Gate at or near the end of Swarcliffe Lane leading to Ashby-de-la-Zouch aforesaid;" and for granting more effectual Powers in lieu thereof. (Repealed by Annual Turnpike Acts Continuance Act 1878 (41 & 42 Vict. c. 62))
Wakefield Ings Turnpike Trust Act 1863	26 & 27 Vict. c. clvi	13 July 1863
An Act for continuing the Term and amending and extending the Provisions of the Act (Note: Kirkgate and Westgate (Wakefield) Road Act 1831 (1 & 2 Will. 4. c. xxvii)) relating to the Road from the Bottom of Kirkgate to the Bottom of Westgate, both in the Parish of Wakefield in the West Riding of the County of York, and to make other Provisions in lieu thereof.
Glasgow and South Western Railway (Additional Powers) Act 1863	26 & 27 Vict. c. clvii	13 July 1863
An Act to enable the Glasgow and South-western Railway Company to make a Junction Line of Railway to connect the Glasgow and Paisley Joint Line of Railway with the Paisley and Renfrew Railway, and other Works; and for other Purposes.
North Staffordshire Railway (Additional Powers) Act 1863	26 & 27 Vict. c. clviii	13 July 1863
An Act to authorize the North Staffordshire Railway Company to make certain Railways at Burton-upon-Trent, and from their Railway at Burslem to their Railway at Cheddleton, and to acquire Station Lands at Burton and Uttoxeter; and for other Purposes.
Teign Valley Railway Act 1863	26 & 27 Vict. c. clix	13 July 1863
An Act for incorporating "The Teign Valley Railway Company," and for authorizing them to make and maintain "The Teign Valley Railway;" and for other Purposes.
Sligo and Ballaghaderreen Junction Railway Act 1863	26 & 27 Vict. c. clx	13 July 1863
An Act to authorize the Construction of a Railway from the Midland Great Western Railway of Ireland to the Town of Ballaghaderreen; and for other Purposes.
Law Life Assurance Society's Act 1863	26 & 27 Vict. c. clxi	13 July 1863
An Act for enabling the Law Life Assurance Society to sue and be sued in their own Name; and for making further Provision with respect to the Investment of their Monies; and for other Purposes.
Galway Commissioners Waterworks Act 1863	26 & 27 Vict. c. clxii	21 July 1863
An Act to enable the Galway Town Improvement Commissioners to construct Waterworks and obtain a Supply of Water for the Town of Galway; and for other Purposes.
Milford Haven Dock and Railway Act 1863	26 & 27 Vict. c. clxiii	21 July 1863
An Act to revive the Powers for the Purchase of Lands, and to extend the Time for the Completion of Works, authorized by "The Milford Haven Dock and Railway Act, 1860;" and for other Purposes.
Great North of Scotland Railway (Aberdeen Junction) Act 1863	26 & 27 Vict. c. clxiv	21 July 1863
An Act to authorize the Great North of Scotland Railway Company to construct a Railway to connect their Railway with the Scottish North-eastern Railway at Aberdeen.
Metropolitan Railway Act 1863	26 & 27 Vict. c. clxv	21 July 1863
An Act to enable the Metropolitan Railway Company to acquire certain additional Lands for the Purposes of their Undertaking; and for other Purposes.
Carmarthen and Cardigan Railway (Extension to Cardigan) Act 1863	26 & 27 Vict. c. clxvi	21 July 1863
An Act to enable the Carmarthen and Cardigan Railway Company to extend their Railway from Newcastle-Emlyn to Cardigan.
West Yorkshire Railway Act 1863	26 & 27 Vict. c. clxvii	21 July 1863
An Act to enable the Bradford, Wakefield, and Leeds Railway Company to make a Railway to Methley in the West Riding of the County of York; and for other Purposes.
Bristol and North Somerset Railway Act 1863	26 & 27 Vict. c. clxviii	21 July 1863
An Act for making a Railway from the Great Western Railway at Radstock to Bristol, together with Branches therefrom to Camerton and other Places; and for other Purposes.
Lowestoft Water, Gas and Market Act 1863 (repealed)	26 & 27 Vict. c. clxix	21 July 1863
An Act for extending the Limits within which the Lowestoft Water, Gas, and Market Company may supply Water and Gas, and for authorizing them to raise further Monies; and for other Purposes. (Repealed by East Anglian Water (Constitution and Regulation) Order 1990 (SI 1990/2574))
Banffshire Railway Act 1863 (repealed)	26 & 27 Vict. c. clxx	21 July 1863
An Act for extending the Banff, Portsoy, and Stathisla Railway to Portgordon; and for other Purposes. (Repealed by Great North of Scotland Railway (Further Powers) Act 1867 (30 & 31 Vict. c. cxc))
Dare Valley Railway Act 1863	26 & 27 Vict. c. clxxi	21 July 1863
An Act for making a Railway from the Aberdare Railway in the Parish of Aberdare in the County of Glamorgan, with a Branch therefrom to be called "The Dare Valley Railway;" and for other Purposes.
Hammersmith and City Junction Railway Act 1863	26 & 27 Vict. c. clxxii	21 July 1863
An Act to authorize the Hammersmith and City Railway Company to make another Junction with the Great Western Railway; and for other Purposes.
Uxbridge and Rickmansworth Railway Amendment Act 1863 (repealed)	26 & 27 Vict. c. clxxiii	21 July 1863
An Act to extend the Time for making the Uxbridge and Rickmansworth Railway. (Repealed by Statute Law (Repeals) Act 2013 (c. 2))
Birmingham and Sutton Coldfield Extension Railway Act 1863	26 & 27 Vict. c. clxxiv	21 July 1863
An Act for incorporating a Company for making a Railway in the Counties of Warwick, Stafford, and in the City and County of the City of Lichfield, to be called "The Birmingham and Sutton Coldfield Extension Railway;" and for other Purposes.
Hastings Harbour Act 1863	26 & 27 Vict. c. clxxv	21 July 1863
An Act to authorize the Construction of a Tramroad from the South-eastern Railway at Hastings to Hastings Harbour.
Wexford Free Bridge Approaches and Roads Act 1863	26 & 27 Vict. c. clxxvi	21 July 1863
An Act to provide additional Powers for the Completion of certain Approach Roads to Wexford Free Bridge; and for other Purposes.
London and North Western Railway (New Branch Lines) Act 1863	26 & 27 Vict. c. clxxvii	21 July 1863
An Act to empower the London and North-western Railway Company to make new Branch Railways, and to abandon Part of the Chelford and Knutsford Line of their Railway; and for other Purposes.
Mistley, Thorpe and Walton Railway Act 1863	26 & 27 Vict. c. clxxviii	21 July 1863
An Act for making a Railway from the Great Eastern Railway at Mistley to Walton-on-the-Naze in the County of Essex; and for other Purposes.
Bala and Dolgelley Railway Act 1863	26 & 27 Vict. c. clxxix	21 July 1863
An Act to enable the Bala and Dolgelley Railway Company to construct additional Works at Dolgelley in the County of Merioneth; to amend the Acts relating to the Company; and to authorize certain Arrangements with the Aberystwith and Welsh Coast Railway Company; and for other Purposes.
Frieston Reclamation Act 1863	26 & 27 Vict. c. clxxx	21 July 1863
An Act for incorporating the Frieston Reclamation Company; and for authorizing them to reclaim certain Lands in the Estuary of the Wash; and for other Purposes.
Madras Irrigation and Canal (Accounts) Act 1863	26 & 27 Vict. c. clxxxi	21 July 1863
An Act for authorizing the Madras Irrigation and Canal Company to keep separate Accounts; and for other Purposes.
Midland Railway (Bristol Line) Act 1863	26 & 27 Vict. c. clxxxii	21 July 1863
An Act for the Construction by the Midland Railway Company of a new Railway in the City of Bristol; and for other Purposes.
Midland Railway (New Lines and Additional Powers) Act 1863	26 & 27 Vict. c. clxxxiii	21 July 1863
An Act for enabling the Midland Railway Company to construct new Railways and Works, and to acquire additional Lands in the West Riding of the County of York, and in the Counties of Derby, Warwick, Leicester, Gloucester, the City of Worcester, Nottingham, the Town of Nottingham, and Northampton; and for other Purposes.
Newhaven Harbour and Ouse Lower Navigation Improvement Act 1863	26 & 27 Vict. c. clxxxiv	21 July 1863
An Act to enable "The Trustees of Newhaven Harbour and Ouse Lower Navigation" to form a new Cut for diverting the Channel of the River Ouse, and to construct a Road, Tramway, and other Works for the Improvement of the said Harbour and Navigation; and for other Purposes.
Worcester, Dean Forest, and Monmouth Railway Act 1863 (repealed)	26 & 27 Vict. c. clxxxv	21 July 1863
An Act for making Railways from the Worcester and Hereford Line of the West Midland Railway Company through the Forest of Dean to the Coleford, Monmouth, Usk, and Pontypool Railway; and for other Purposes. (Repealed by Statute Law (Repeals) Act 2013 (c. 2))
Colne Valley and Halstead Railway Act 1863	26 & 27 Vict. c. clxxxvi	21 July 1863
An Act to enable the Colne Valley and Halstead Railway Company to increase their Capital, to use Part of the Great Eastern Railway at Haverhill; and for other Purposes with respect to the same Company.
Edinburgh Water Company's Amendment Act 1863 (repealed)	26 & 27 Vict. c. clxxxvii	21 July 1863
An Act to authorize the Edinburgh Water Company to introduce an additional Supply of Water to the City of Edinburgh and Town and Port of Leith and Places adjacent; and for other Purposes. (Repealed by Edinburgh Corporation Order Confirmation Act 1958 (7 & 8 Eliz. 2. c. v))
Banff, Macduff and Turriff Extension Railway Act 1863	26 & 27 Vict. c. clxxxviii	21 July 1863
An Act to enable the Banff, Macduff, and Turriff Extension Railway Company to extend their Railway from the Bridge of Banff to the Harbour of Macduff; and for other Purposes.
Formartine and Buchan Railway Act 1863	26 & 27 Vict. c. clxxxix	21 July 1863
An Act to authorize the Formartine and Buchan Railway Company to abandon the authorized Extension to Fraserburgh, and to make another Line instead thereof; also to make a new Road in connexion with the Peterhead Extension; and for other Purposes.
Great Eastern Railway (Additional Powers) Act 1863	26 & 27 Vict. c. cxc	21 July 1863
An Act to amend "The Great Eastern Railway Act, 1862," (Note: Great Eastern Railway Act 1862 (25 & 26 Vict. c. ccxxiii)) and to confer Powers in reference to the Undertakings of the Great Eastern, the Waveney Valley, the Lynn and Hunstanton, and the Bishop Stortford, Dunmow, and Braintree Railways; and for other Purposes.
Great Northern Railway (Spalding to March) Act 1863	26 & 27 Vict. c. cxci	21 July 1863
An Act to enable the Great Northern Railway Company to extend their Railway from Spalding to the Great Eastern Railway at March in Cambridgeshire.
London, Brighton and South Coast Railway (Various Powers) Act 1863	26 & 27 Vict. c. cxcii	21 July 1863
An Act to enable the London, Brighton, and South Coast Railway Company to make a new Line of Railway at Croydon, and a Tramway at Newhaven; to acquire additional Lands; and for other Purposes.
Lynn and Sutton Bridge Railway Act 1863	26 & 27 Vict. c. cxciii	21 July 1863
An Act to amend "The Lynn and Sutton Bridge Railway Act, 1861." (Note: Lynn and Sutton Bridge Railway Act 1861 (24 & 25 Vict. c. ccxlv))
North British Railway (Wansbeck Railway and Finance) Act 1863	26 & 27 Vict. c. cxciv	21 July 1863
An Act to authorize the North British Railway Company to raise more Money; and an Amalgamation with them of the Wansbeck Railway Company; and for other Purposes.
Esk Valley Railway Act 1863	26 & 27 Vict. c. cxcv	21 July 1863
An Act for making a Railway from a Point near to Eskbank Station on the Line of the Hawick Branch of the North British Railway to Springfield in the Parish of Lasswade and County of Edinburgh, to be called "The Esk Valley Railway;" and for other Purposes.
Brecon and Merthyr Railway Act 1863	26 & 27 Vict. c. cxcvi	21 July 1863
An Act for making and maintaining Bridges over the River Thames at Hampton and Shepperton; and for other Purposes.
Thames Bridges Act 1863	26 & 27 Vict. c. cxcvii	21 July 1863
An Act for making and maintaining Bridges over the River Thames at Hampton and Shepperton; and for other Purposes.
Great Western Railway (South Wales Amalgamation) Act 1863	26 & 27 Vict. c. cxcviii	21 July 1863
An Act for the Amalgamation of the South Wales Railway Company with the Great Western and West Midland Railway Companies; and for other Purposes.
Ely Valley Extension Railway Act 1863	26 & 27 Vict. c. cxcix	28 July 1863
An Act for incorporating a Company, and for making and maintaining the Ely Valley Extension Railway; and for other Purposes.
Milford Railway (Amendment) Act 1863	26 & 27 Vict. c. cc	28 July 1863
An Act to revive the Powers for the Purchase of Land, and for the Completion of the Milford Railway, and to raise further Capital, and to authorize Agreements with other Companies; and for other Purposes.
Brecon and Llandovery Junction Railway Act 1863	26 & 27 Vict. c. cci	28 July 1863
An Act for making a Railway from Defynnock to Llandovery; and for other Purposes.
Rumney and Brecon and Merthyr Railways Act 1863	26 & 27 Vict. c. ccii	28 July 1863
An Act for making a Railway to complete the Connexion between the Brecon and Merthyr Tydfil Junction Railway and the Rumney Railway; for enabling the Brecon and Merthyr Tydfil Junction Railway Company to acquire the Rumney Railway; for facilitating the Transmission of Traffic over, from, and at the Rhymney Railway; and for other Purposes.
Kettering, Thrapstone and Huntingdon Railway Act 1863	26 & 27 Vict. c. cciii	28 July 1863
An Act to enable the Kettering and Thrapstone Railway Company to extend their authorized Line of Railway to Huntingdon, with a Branch Railway at Huntingdon; to change their Name; to authorize them to use certain Stations and Portions of Railway of the Great Eastern Railway Company and the Great Northern Railway Company; and to make Traffic Arrangements with the Midland Railway Company and the Great Northern Railway Company; and for other Purposes.
London, Chatham and Dover Railway Act 1863	26 & 27 Vict. c. cciv	28 July 1863
An Act to enable the London, Chatham, and Dover Railway Company to extend their Railway to Greenwich; to improve the Communication with the Victoria Station; and to execute certain other Works in connexion with their Undertaking.
Tottenham and Hampstead Junction Railway Act 1863	26 & 27 Vict. c. ccv	28 July 1863
An Act for authorizing the Tottenham and Hampstead Junction Railway Company to make and maintain an additional Line of Railway, and to raise further Monies; and for other Purposes.
City of London Traffic Regulation Act 1863 (repealed)	26 & 27 Vict. c. ccvi	28 July 1863
An Act for the better Regulation of the Traffic in the Streets of the City of London, and for the Prevention of Obstructions therein. (Repealed by Statute Law (Repeals) Act 2013 (c. 2))
Hoylake Railway Act 1863	26 & 27 Vict. c. ccvii	28 July 1863
An Act for making and maintaining Railways from Birkenhead and Poulton-cum-Seacombe to Hoylake in the County of Chester.
West London Extension Railway Act 1863	26 & 27 Vict. c. ccviii	28 July 1863
An Act for increasing the Capital of and conferring further Powers on the West London Extension Railway Company; amending their Acts; providing for the Dissolution of the West London Railway Company; and for other Purposes.
Wicklow Copper Mine Company's Act 1863	26 & 27 Vict. c. ccix	28 July 1863
An Act for the Amalgamation of the Hibernian Mine Company with the Wicklow Copper Mine Company (Limited); and for other Purposes.
Morayshire Railway Act 1863	26 & 27 Vict. c. ccx	28 July 1863
An Act to enable the Morayshire Railway Company to raise additional Capital; and for other Purposes.
Putney and Fulham Bridge Act 1863 (repealed)	26 & 27 Vict. c. ccxi	28 July 1863
An Act to incorporate a Company for making a new Bridge from Putney to Fulham; and for other Purposes. (Repealed by Local Law (Greater London Council and Inner London Boroughs) Order 1965 (SI 1965/540))
Bonelli's Electric Telegraph Act 1863	26 & 27 Vict. c. ccxii	28 July 1863
An Act to amend the Act (Note: Bonelli's Electric Telegraph Act 1861 (24 & 25 Vict. c. xcii)) and enlarge the Powers of Bonelli's Electric Telegraph Company (Limited).
North British (Edinburgh, Dunfermline and Perth) Railway Act 1863	26 & 27 Vict. c. ccxiii	28 July 1863
An Act to authorize the Construction of Railways and other Works for improving the Railway Communication between Edinburgh and Perth viâ the Firth of Forth; and for other Purposes.
Elgin and Nairn Roads and Bridges Act 1863	26 & 27 Vict. c. ccxiv	28 July 1863
An Act for more effectually making, maintaining, and keeping in repair the Roads, Highways, and Bridges within the Counties of Elgin and Nairn; and for other Purposes.
Haddingtonshire Roads Act 1863	26 & 27 Vict. c. ccxv	28 July 1863
An Act for repairing, amending, and maintaining the Public Roads and Bridges in the County of Haddington.
Hadlow Railway Act 1863 (repealed)	26 & 27 Vict. c. ccxvi	28 July 1863
An Act for making a Railway from the Town of Hadlow in the County of Kent to the Sevenoaks, Maidstone, and Tunbridge Railway in the Parish of Ightham in the aforesaid County; and for other Purposes. (Repealed by Statute Law (Repeals) Act 2013 (c. 2))
London and North Western Railway (Additional Powers) Act 1863	26 & 27 Vict. c. ccxvii	28 July 1863
An Act for conferring additional Powers on the London and North-western Railway Company for the Construction of Works, and otherwise in relation to their own Undertaking and the Undertakings of other Companies; and for other Purposes.
London, Brighton and South Coast Railway (Mitcham and Tooting Lines, &c.) Act 1863	26 & 27 Vict. c. ccxviii	28 July 1863
An Act to enable the London, Brighton, and South Coast Railway Company to make new Lines of Railway to Mitcham, Sutton, and Tooting, in Surrey, and to connect the same with other Railways; and for other Purposes.
New Milford Docks Act 1863	26 & 27 Vict. c. ccxix	28 July 1863
An Act for authorizing the Construction of a Dock and Railways and other Works upon or near Neyland Pill at Milford Haven in the County of Pembroke; and for other Purposes.
Northampton and Banbury Junction Railway Act 1863	26 & 27 Vict. c. ccxx	28 July 1863
An Act to authorize the Construction of a Railway in the County of Northampton, to be called "The Northampton and Banbury Junction Railway;" and for other Purposes.
North-eastern Railway Company (Newcastle-upon-Tyne and Starbeck Branches) Act 1863	26 & 27 Vict. c. ccxxi	28 July 1863
An Act to enable the North-eastern Railway Company to construct Branch Railways at Newcastle-upon-Tyne and Starbeck; and for other Purposes.
Peterborough, Wisbeach, and Sutton Railway Act 1863	26 & 27 Vict. c. ccxxii	28 July 1863
An Act for making a Railway from Peterborough to Thorney, Wisbeach, and Sutton; and for other Purposes.
Scottish Central Railway (Dundee, Perth and Aberdeen Railway Purchase) Act 1863	26 & 27 Vict. c. ccxxiii	28 July 1863
An Act to vest the Undertaking of the Dundee and Perth and Aberdeen Railway Junction Company, and their Interest in the Dundee and Newtyle Railway, in the Scottish Central Railway Company; and for other Purposes.
Waterford and Passage Railway Act 1863	26 & 27 Vict. c. ccxxiv	28 July 1863
An Act to enable the Waterford and Passage Railway Company to extend their Railway to the South-west Shore of the Estuary of the River Suir at Passage, and in connexion therewith to establish, make, and maintain Ferries on or across the said Estuary; and for other Purposes.
Great Eastern Railway (Steamboats) Act 1863	26 & 27 Vict. c. ccxxv	28 July 1863
An Act to authorize the Great Eastern Railway Company to run Steam Vessels between Harwich and certain Foreign Ports.
North British Railway (Steamboats) Act 1863	26 & 27 Vict. c. ccxxvi	28 July 1863
An Act to authorize the North British Railway Company to run Steam Vessels between Port Carlisle and Silloth and Belfast.
Victoria Station and Pimlico Railway Act 1863	26 & 27 Vict. c. ccxxvii	28 July 1863
An Act to confer further Powers on the London Brighton, and South Coast Railway Company, with reference to the widening and Improvement of the Pimlico Railway; and for other Purposes.
West London Docks and Warehouses Act 1863	26 & 27 Vict. c. ccxxviii	28 July 1863
An Act to incorporate a Company for constructing Docks, Warehouses, and other Works in the Parish of Saint Mary, Battersea, in the County of Surrey.
Newry and Greenore Railway Act 1863	26 & 27 Vict. c. ccxxix	28 July 1863
An Act to authorize the Construction of a Railway from Newry to Carlingford Lough, and of a Pier and other Works in connexion therewith.
Saint Ives and West Cornwall Junction Railway Act 1863 (repealed)	26 & 27 Vict. c. ccxxx	28 July 1863
An Act for making a Railway from the West Cornwall Railway at or near Saint Erth to the Town of Saint Ives in the County of Cornwall; and for other Purposes. (Repealed by Statute Law (Repeals) Act 2013 (c. 2))
Scottish North Eastern Railway Act 1863	26 & 27 Vict. c. ccxxxi	28 July 1863
An Act to unite and amalgamate the Undertaking of the Dundee and Arbroath Railway Company with the Undertaking of the Scottish North-eastern Railway Company, and to regulate the Management of and confer additional Powers on the United Company; and for other Purposes.
Isle of Wight Railway's (Extensions) Act 1863	26 & 27 Vict. c. ccxxxii	28 July 1863
An Act for changing the Name of the Isle of Wight Eastern Section Railway Company, and for authorizing them to make and maintain Railways (the Central Lines), in Extension of their authorized Railways (the Eastern Lines), and to raise Monies for the Purpose, and to make Arrangements with other Companies; and for other Purposes.
Dundalk and Greenore Railway Act 1863	26 & 27 Vict. c. ccxxxiii	28 July 1863
An Act for making a Railway from the Irish North-western Railway at Dundalk to Greenore in the County of Louth; and for other Purposes.
Sidmouth and Budleigh-Salterton Railway Act 1863	26 & 27 Vict. c. ccxxxiv	28 July 1863
An Act for incorporating a Company for making a Railway from the Sidmouth Railway, near Tipton, to Budleigh-Salterton; and for other Purposes.
Northumberland Central Railway Act 1863	26 & 27 Vict. c. ccxxxv	28 July 1863
An Act for making Railways in the County of Northumberland from the Wansbeck Railway in the Parish of Hartburn to the Parish of Ford, and thence to the Berwick and Kelso Branch of the North-eastern Railway; and for other Purposes.
Irish North Western Railway (Quay Extension) Act 1863	26 & 27 Vict. c. ccxxxvi	28 July 1863
An Act to empower the Irish North-western Railway Company to extend their Railway along the Quays of Dundalk; and for other Purposes.
Edinburgh and Glasgow Railway (Queensferry) Act 1863	26 & 27 Vict. c. ccxxxvii	28 July 1863
An Act to authorize the Edinburgh and Glasgow Railway Company to make a Railway to South Queensferry, with subsidiary Branches and Works; and for other Purposes.
North Eastern Railway (Hull and Doncaster Branch) Act 1863	26 & 27 Vict. c. ccxxxviii	28 July 1863
An Act to enable the North-eastern Railway Company to construct a Railway from the Hull and Selby Railway at Staddlethorpe to the authorized Line of the South Yorkshire Railway near Thorne, with Two Branches therefrom, to raise additional Capital; and for other Purposes.

=== Private acts ===
Short title	Citation	Royal assent
Long title
Sir Gilbert Stirling's Estate Act 1863	26 & 27 Vict. c. 1 Pr.	22 June 1863
An Act to continue an Act for extending the Time during which the Trustees of the late Sir Gilbert Stirling of Mansfield, Baronet, were authorized to purchase Lands to be entailed in the Terms declared by certain Trust Deeds executed by him; and for other Purposes.
Sir Henry Meux's Estate Act 1863	26 & 27 Vict. c. 2 Pr.	29 June 1863
An Act for making Provision with respect to the Interest of Sir Henry Meux, Baronet, in the Business of the Horse Shoe Brewery.
Finch Hatton's Estate Act 1863	26 & 27 Vict. c. 3 Pr.	28 July 1863
An Act to modify the Condition of Residence at Haverholme Priory contained in the Will of the late Sir Jenison William Gordon, Baronet, in so far as such Condition affects the present or any future Infant Tenant in Tail under the Limitations of the same Will.
Aston's Estate Act 1863	26 & 27 Vict. c. 4 Pr.	28 July 1863
An Act for a Re-settlement of Estates devised by the Will of the Right Honourable Sir Arthur Ingram Aston, deceased.
Fife Estates Improvement Act 1858 Amendment Act 1863	26 & 27 Vict. c. 5 Pr.	28 July 1863
An Act to amend "The Fife Estates Improvement Act, 1858"; (Note: Fife Estates Improvement Act 1858 (21 & 22 Vict. c. 4 Pr.)) to authorize the Exchange of the entailed Estate of Ardgye in the County of Elgin for the Lands of Westerton in the same County, to be entailed in lieu thereof; and for other Purposes.
Bolton Estates Act 1863	26 & 27 Vict. c. 6 Pr.	28 July 1863
An Act for enabling Agricultural Leases to be granted of the Estates called the Bolton Estates, entailed by an Act of the Twenty-seventh Year of the Reign of His Majesty King Henry the Eighth; (Note: Partition of Lands between the heirs of Lord Broke Act 1535 (27 Hen. 8. c. 44)) and for enabling, with the Sanction of the Court of Chancery, the granting of Building and Mining and Improvement Leases, and for enabling the Partition and Sale of the same Estates.
Arundel Estate Act 1863	26 & 27 Vict. c. 7 Pr.	28 July 1863
An Act for the better Management of the Estates annexed to the Earldom of Arundel; and for the Sale of certain Parts of the same Estates, and for other Purposes, the Short Title whereof is "The Arundel Estate Act, 1863."
Leconfield Estate Act 1863	26 & 27 Vict. c. 8 Pr.	28 July 1863
An Act for enlarging and extending the Powers given by "Wyndham's Estate Act, 1854," (Note: Wyndham's Estate Act 1854 (17 & 18 Vict. c. 7 Pr.)) of or over divers Freehold, Copyhold, and Leasehold Estates, devised by or subject to the Limitations of the Will of the Right Honourable George Obrien Earl of Egremont deceased.

=== Sources ===
- Rickards, George Kettilby, ed. (1863). The Statutes of the United Kingdom of Great Britain and Ireland, 26 & 27 Victoria, 1863 London. Eyre and Spottiswoode – via Internet Archive.
- A Collection of the Public General Statutes passed in the Twenty-sixth and Twenty-seventh Years of the Reign of Her Majesty Queen Victoria. London: Eyre and Spottiswoode. 1863 – via Google Books.

== See also ==
- List of acts of the Parliament of the United Kingdom
