= Regimental Debts Act 1863 =

Act of the Parliament of the United Kingdom

Regimental Debts Act 1863 (Note: Section 1.)
- Act of Parliament
- Parliament of the United Kingdom
- Long title: An Act to consolidate and amend the Acts relating to the Payment of Regimental Debts, and the Distribution of the Effects of Officers and Soldiers in case of Death, and to make like Provision for the Cases of Desertion and Insanity, and other Cases.
- Citation: 26 & 27 Vict. c. 57
- Territorial extent: United Kingdom

Dates
- Royal assent: 21 July 1863
- Commencement: 21 July 1863 (Note: Section 37.)
- Repealed: 1 October 1893
Other legislation
Amends	See § Repealed enactments
Repeals/revokes	See § Repealed enactments
Repealed by	Regimental Debts Act 1893

Status: Repealed

Text of statute as originally enacted

The Regimental Debts Act 1863 (26 & 27 Vict. c. 57) was an act of the Parliament of the United Kingdom that consolidated enactments relating to regimental debts.

== Provisions ==
=== Repealed enactments ===
Section 3 of the act repealed 5 enactments, listed in the schedule to the act.

Citation	Short title	Description	Extent of Repeal
58 Geo. 3. c. 73	Payment of Regimental Debts Act 1818	An Act for regulating the Payment of Regimental Debts and the Distribution of the Effects of Officers and Soldiers dying in Service, and the Receipt of Sums due to Soldiers.	Sections One, Two, and Three.
6 Geo. 4. c. 61	Army Act 1825	An Act to amend Two Acts; of the Fifty-eighth Year of His late Majesty, for regulating the Payment of Regimental Debts and the Distribution of the Effects of Officers and Soldiers dying in Service, and the Receipt of Sums due to Soldiers; and of the Fourth Year of His present Majesty, for punishing Mutiny and Desertion of Officers and Soldiers in the Service of the East India Company.	The whole.
11 Geo. 4. & 1 Will. 4. c. 41	Army Pensions Act 1830	An Act to make further Regulations with respect to Army Pensioners.	Section Five, except as to Pension or Prize Money.
20 & 21 Vict. c. 66	Mutiny, etc., East Indies Act 1857	An Act for punishing Mutiny and Desertion of Officers and Soldiers in the Service of the East India Company, and for regulating in such Service the Payment of Regimental Debts and the Distribution of the Effects of Officers and Soldiers dying in the Service.	Sections Sixty-one to Sixty-six, both inclusive.
26 & 27 Vict. c. 8	Mutiny Act 1863	An Act for punishing Mutiny and Desertion, and for the better Payment of the Army and their Quarters.	Sections Ninety-eight to One hundred and two, both inclusive.

== Subsequent developments ==
The whole act was repealed by section 32 of the Regimental Debts Act 1893 (56 & 57 Vict. c. 5), which came into force on 1 October 189.
