= Alkali Act 1863 =

Act of the Parliament of the United Kingdom

Alkali Act 1863 (Note: Section 1.)
- Act of Parliament
- Parliament of the United Kingdom
- Long title: An Act for the more effectual condensation of Muriatic Acid Gas in Alkali Works.
- Citation: 26 & 27 Vict. c. 124
- Territorial extent: United Kingdom

Dates
- Royal assent: 28 July 1863
- Commencement: 1 January 1864 (Note: Section 2.)
- Expired: 1 July 1868 (Note: Section 19.)
- Repealed: 1 January 1882
Other legislation
Amended by	Alkali Act 1868; Alkali Act 1874
Repealed by	Alkali, &c. Works Regulation Act 1881

Status: Repealed

Text of statute as originally enacted

The Alkali Act 1863 (26 & 27 Vict. c. 124) was an act of the Parliament of the United Kingdom.

Under the act, an alkali inspector and four sub-inspectors were appointed to curb discharge into the air of muriatic acid gas (gaseous hydrochloric acid) from Leblanc alkali works. It was later extended to cover other industrial pollutants.

Section 19 provided that the act was to continue in force until 1 July 1868, and no longer. This section was repealed by section 1 of 31 & 32 Vict. c. 36, which enacted that the Alkali Act 1863 was "continued without any such limitation".

== Subsequent developments ==
=== Alkali Act 1868 ===
Alkali Act 1868
- Act of Parliament
- Parliament of the United Kingdom
- Long title: An Act to make perpetual the Alkali Act 1863.
- Citation: 31 & 32 Vict. c. 36
- Territorial extent: United Kingdom

Dates
- Royal assent: 25 June 1868
- Commencement: 25 June 1868 (Note: The Acts of Parliament (Commencement) Act 1793.)
- Repealed: 16 August 1878 (Note: This act was re-repealed on 1 January 1882)
Other legislation
Amends	Alkali Act 1863
Repealed by	Statute Law Revision Act 1878 (Note: This act was re-repealed by the Alkali, &c. Works Regulation Act 1881 44 & 45 Vict. c. 37).)
Relates to	Alkali, &c. Works Regulation Act 1881

Status: Repealed

Text of statute as originally enacted

The act 31 & 32 Vict. c. 36, sometimes called the Alkali Act 1868, the Alkali Act Perpetuation Act 1868, or the Alkali Act (1863) Perpetuation Act 1868, was an act of the Parliament of the United Kingdom. It made perpetual the Alkali Act 1863 (26 & 27 Vict. c. 124). The bill for this act was originally called the Alkali Act Continuance Bill and was subsequently called the Alkali Act (1863) Perpetuation Bill. The act 31 & 32 Vict. c. 36 was repealed by section 30 of the Alkali, &c. Works Regulation Act 1881 (44 & 45 Vict. c. 37), which further provided that this repeal was "without prejudice to anything done or suffered before the commencement of this Act, or to the recovery of any penalty incurred before or proceeding pending at the commencement of this Act; and any such penalty or proceeding may be recovered or continued as if this Act had not been passed."

=== Alkali Act 1874 ===
Alkali Act 1874
- Act of Parliament
- Parliament of the United Kingdom
- Long title: An Act to amend the Alkali Act, 1863.
- Citation: 37 & 38 Vict. c. 43
- Territorial extent: United Kingdom

Dates
- Royal assent: 30 July 1874
- Commencement: 1 March 1875
- Repealed: 1 January 1882
Other legislation
Amends	Alkali Act 1863
Repealed by	Alkali, &c. Works Regulation Act 1881

Status: Repealed

Text of statute as originally enacted

In 1874, under the Alkali Act 1874 (37 & 38 Vict. c. 43), sometimes called the Alkali Act (1863) Amendment Act 1874, the Inspector became the Chief Inspector. The first Chief Inspector was Dr Robert Angus Smith, he was statutorily responsible for the standards set and maintained by the Inspectorate, and reported directly to the Permanent Secretary of his department. For the first sixty years of its existence, the inspectorate was solely concerned with the heavy chemicals industry, but from the 1920s onwards, its responsibilities were expanded, culminating in the Alkali. &c. Works Order 1958 (SI 1958/497). This placed all major heavy industries which emitted smoke, grit, dust and fumes under the supervision of the Inspectorate.

== Timeline ==
The Inspectorate has worked under the purview of many different departments:

- From 1863 to 1872, the Board of Trade
- From 1873 to 1918, the Local Government Board
- From 1919 to 1951, the Ministry of Health
- From 1951 to 1970, the Ministry of Housing and Local Government
- From 1970 to 1975, the Department of the Environment

The Chief Inspector's independence disappeared when the Inspectorate was transferred to the Health and Safety Executive in 1975.

The Inspectorate was known as Industrial Air Pollution Inspectorate from 1983 to 1987 and became Her Majesty's Inspectorate of Pollution (HMIP) when it was transferred back to the Department of the Environment in 1987.

HMIP became part of the Environment Agency and Scottish Environment Protection Agency on 1 April 1996.

Together with amendments, the Alkali Act became the main legislative control of industrial pollution in the UK.

== Subsequent developments ==
The whole act was repealed by section 20 of the Alkali, &c. Works Regulation Act 1881 (44 & 45 Vict. c. 37), which came into force on 1 January 1882. The 1881 act was amended by the Alkali, &c. Works Regulation Act 1892 (55 & 56 Vict. c. 30), and subsequent repealed by the Alkali, &c. Works Regulation Act 1906 (6 Edw. 7. c. 14).

The Alkali Acts were finally replaced by the Environmental Protection Act 1990.

== Bibliography ==
- George Pitt Lewis, assisted by H A de Colyar, "Jurisdiction and Proceedings under the Alkali Act, 1863". A Complete Practice of the County Courts. Stevens and Sons. London. 1880. Part 2. Book 5. Division 1. Chapter 2. Pages 909 to 914.
- Baker, Thomas. "Alkali Works Act". The Laws Relating to Public Health, Sanitary-Medical-Protective. 1865. Page 62. See also page 591 to 595.
- Pollock and Nicol. "The Alkali Act, 1863". Pollock's Practice of the County Courts. Sixth Edition. H Sweet. London. 1868. Page 4. See also pages 763 to 766.
- "The Alkali Act, 1863". Report of the Ministry of Housing and Local Government 1959. Cmnd 1027. HMSO. Page 35. See also the rest of chapter 4, "The Alkali Inspectorate" at page 33 onwards. Google Books.
- http://www.glossary.com/reference.php?q=Alkali%20Act%201863
