= Alkali, &c. Works Regulation Act 1881 =

Act of the Parliament of the United Kingdom

Alkali, &c. Works Regulation Act 1881 (Note: Section 1.)
- Act of Parliament
- Parliament of the United Kingdom
- Long title: An Act to consolidate the Alkali Acts, 1863 and 1874, and to make further provision for regulating Alkali and certain other works in which noxious or offensive gases are evolved.
- Citation: 44 & 45 Vict. c. 37
- Territorial extent: United Kingdom

Dates
- Royal assent: 11 August 1881
- Commencement: 1 January 1882 (Note: Section 2.)
- Repealed: 1 January 1907
Other legislation
Amends	See § Repealed enactments
Repeals/revokes	See § Repealed enactments
Amended by	Alkali, &c. Works Regulation Act 1892
Repealed by	Alkali, &c. Works Regulation Act 1906
Relates to	Statute Law Revision Act 1878

Status: Repealed

Text of statute as originally enacted

The Alkali, &c. Works Regulation Act 1881 (44 & 45 Vict. c. 37) was an act of the Parliament of the United Kingdom that consolidated enactments related to the regulation of alkali works and certain other works in which noxious or offensive gases are evolved in the United Kingdom.

== Provisions ==
=== Repealed enactments ===
Section 30 of the act repealed 3 enactments, listed in that section.

Citation	Short title	Description	Extent of repeal
26 & 27 Vict. c. 124	Alkali Act 1863	The Alkali Act, 1863.	The whole act.
31 & 32 Vict. c. 36	Alkali Act 1868	The Act to make perpetual the Alkali Act 1863.	The whole act. (Note: The act was already repealed by section 1 of, and the schedule to, the Statute Law Revision Act 1878 (41 & 42 Vict. c. 79).)
37 & 38 Vict. c. 43	Alkali Act 1874	The Alkali Act, 1874.	The whole act.

== Subsequent developments ==
Alkali, &c. Works Regulation Act 1892 (Note: Section 4.)
- Act of Parliament
- Parliament of the United Kingdom
- Long title: An Act to amend the Alkali, &c. Works Regulation Act, 1881.
- Citation: 55 & 56 Vict. c. 30
- Territorial extent: United Kingdom

Dates
- Royal assent: 27 June 1892
- Commencement: 1 April 1893 (Note: Section 3.)
- Repealed: 1 January 1907
Other legislation
Amends	Alkali, &c. Works Regulation Act 1881
Repealed by	Alkali, &c. Works Regulation Act 1906

Status: Repealed

Text of statute as originally enacted

The act was amended by the Alkali, &c. Works Regulation Act 1892 (55 & 56 Vict. c. 30).

The whole act was repealed by section 30 of, and the second schedule to, the Alkali, &c. Works Regulation Act 1906 (6 Edw. 7. c. 14), which came into force on 1 January 1907.
