= Petroleum (Hawkers) Act 1881 =

Act of the Parliament of the United Kingdom

Petroleum (Hawkers) Act 1881 (Note: Section 7.)
- Act of Parliament
- Parliament of the United Kingdom
- Long title: An Act to regulate the hawking of petroleum and other substances of a like nature.
- Citation: 44 & 45 Vict. c. 67
- Introduced by: Leonard Courtney (Under-Secretary of State for the Home Department) 29 July 1881 (Second reading of Bill) (Commons)
- Territorial extent: United Kingdom

Dates
- Royal assent: 27 August 1881
- Commencement: 27 August 1881 (Note: The Acts of Parliament (Commencement) Act 1793.)
- Repealed: 4 August 1926
Other legislation
Repealed by	(United Kingdom) England and Wales and Scotland: Petroleum Act 1926; (Republic of Ireland) Ireland: Dangerous Substances Act 1972
Relates to	Petroleum Act 1871

Status: Repealed

Text of statute as originally enacted

The Petroleum (Hawkers’) Act 1881 (44 & 45 Vict. c. 67) was an act of the Parliament of the United Kingdom to regulate the hawking or selling of petroleum and similar substances.

== Background ==
In the 1870s concerns had grown about the safety of carrying petroleum and similar hazardous commodities around in carts particularly in urban areas. The activities of hawkers of petroleum were controlled, in general terms, under the provisions of the Petroleum Act 1871 (34 & 35 Vict. c. 105). However, offences were regularly committed. For example:

- In 1871 in Newport Isle of Wight an ironmonger was 'going round in cart and hawking petroleum' without a licence (Southampton Herald 16 Dec 1871).
- In 1874 in Bristol a man was summonsed for hawking petroleum without a licence (Bristol Mercury 5 December 1874).
- In 1876 in Sheffield a lamp and oil dealer was charged with hawking petroleum from door to door contrary to the terms of his licence (Sheffield Independent 21 January 1876).

In a legal case in the 1870s the court determined that petroleum could not be kept for hawking unless the cart was licensed. The Law Officers decided that a cart could not be licensed as it was not a place.

Legislation was seen as necessary to better regulate this trade. The 1881 act was enacted to remedy this deficiency. The quantities of petroleum carried for hawking were also specified as a maximum of 20 gallons (91 litres).

== Provisions ==
The act received royal assent on 27 August 1881. Its long title is 'An Act to regulate the hawking of petroleum and other substances of a like nature'. The act comprises seven sections:

- Section 1 Power to hawk petroleum
- Section 2 Regulations for hawking petroleum, including: amount of petroleum not to exceed 20 gallons; conveyed in a closed vessel free of leakage; ventilated to avoid an explosive mixture; no fire or naked light to be brought dangerously near; carriages to prevent escape of petroleum; care to prevent escape into building or drain; precautions to prevent fire or explosion
- Section 3 Modifications of conditions of licence under the Petroleum Act 1871, previous condition made under Petroleum Act 1871 are void
- Section 4 Power of constable as to prevention of offences, to seize and retain petroleum, vessels or carriage believed to contravene conditions
- Section 5 Saving of rights of municipal boroughs, no authority to hawk petroleum if forbidden
- Section 6 Definitions, carriage and hawker
- Section 7 Short title and construction

This act shall be construed as one with the Petroleum Acts 1971 and 1979 and together may be cited as the Petroleum Acts 1871 to 1881.

== Subsequent developments ==
Offences under the 1881 act occurred, for example:

- In 1887 in Springfield Essex a petroleum hawker was summonsed for an offence under the Petroleum Hawkers’ Act (Essex Standard 30 April 1887).
- In 1889 in Chelmsford an oil man and grocer was summonsed under the 1881 Act for allowing a light to ‘get dangerously near to his carriage’, while hawking petroleum (Essex Standard 9 November 1889).

A parliamentary select committee on petroleum met in 1898. It identified deficiencies in the law in respect of the keeping, selling, using and conveying of petroleum. It specifically identified that further provisions should be made for the hawking of petroleum oil and petroleum spirit. However, no immediate changes to the existing legislation were made.

The whole act was repealed for Great Britain by section 11(4) of, and the fourth schedule to, the Petroleum Act 1926 (16 & 17 Geo. 5. c. 25), which came into force on 4 August 1926.

The act applied to Ireland and remained a statute of the Republic of Ireland until 1972 when it was repealed by the Dangerous Substances Act 1972.
