= List of acts of the Parliament of the United Kingdom from 1881 =

This is a complete list of acts of the Parliament of the United Kingdom for the year 1881.

Note that the first parliament of the United Kingdom was held in 1801; parliaments between 1707 and 1800 were either parliaments of Great Britain or of Ireland). For acts passed up until 1707, see the list of acts of the Parliament of England and the list of acts of the Parliament of Scotland. For acts passed from 1707 to 1800, see the list of acts of the Parliament of Great Britain. See also the list of acts of the Parliament of Ireland.

For acts of the devolved parliaments and assemblies in the United Kingdom, see the list of acts of the Scottish Parliament, the list of acts of the Northern Ireland Assembly, and the list of acts and measures of Senedd Cymru; see also the list of acts of the Parliament of Northern Ireland.

The number shown after each act's title is its chapter number. Acts passed before 1963 are cited using this number, preceded by the year(s) of the reign during which the relevant parliamentary session was held; thus the Union with Ireland Act 1800 is cited as "39 & 40 Geo. 3 c. 67", meaning the 67th act passed during the session that started in the 39th year of the reign of George III and which finished in the 40th year of that reign. Note that the modern convention is to use Arabic numerals in citations (thus "41 Geo. 3" rather than "41 Geo. III"). Acts of the last session of the Parliament of Great Britain and the first session of the Parliament of the United Kingdom are both cited as "41 Geo. 3". Acts passed from 1963 onwards are simply cited by calendar year and chapter number.

All modern acts have a short title, e.g. the Local Government Act 2003. Some earlier acts also have a short title given to them by later acts, such as by the Short Titles Act 1896.

== 44 & 45 Vict. ==
The second session of the 22nd Parliament of the United Kingdom, which met from 6 January 1881 until 27 August 1881.

=== Public general acts ===
Short title	Citation	Royal assent
Long title
Consolidated Fund (No. 1) Act 1881 (repealed)	44 & 45 Vict. c. 1	17 February 1881
An Act to apply the sum of Two million five hundred thousand pounds out of the Consolidated Fund to the service of the year ending on the thirty-first day of March one thousand eight hundred and eighty one. (Repealed by Statute Law Revision Act 1894 (57 & 58 Vict. c. 56))
Burial and Registration Acts (Doubts Removal) Act 1881 (repealed)	44 & 45 Vict. c. 2	17 February 1881
An Act to remove Doubts as to the operation and effect of so much of the Burial Laws Amendment Act, 1880, (Note: Burial Laws Amendment Act 1880 (43 & 44 Vict. c. 41)) as relates to the Births and Deaths Registration Act, 1874. (Note: Births and Deaths Registration Act 1874 (37 & 38 Vict. c. 88)) (Repealed by Births and Deaths Registration Act 1926 (16 & 17 Geo. 5. c. 48))
Judicial Committee Act 1881 (repealed)	44 & 45 Vict. c. 3	17 February 1881
An Act to further improve the Administration of Justice in the Judicial Committee of the Privy Council. (Repealed by Constitutional Reform Act 2005 (c. 4))
Protection of Persons and Property (Ireland) Act 1881 or the Protection of Person and Property (Ireland) Act 1881 or the Coercion Act 1881 or the Crimes Act 1881 (repealed)	44 & 45 Vict. c. 4	2 March 1881
An Act for the better Protection of Person and Property in Ireland. (Repealed by Statute Law Revision Act 1894 (57 & 58 Vict. c. 56))
Peace Preservation (Ireland) Act 1881 (repealed)	44 & 45 Vict. c. 5	21 March 1881
Act to amend the Law relating to the carrying and Possession of Arms, and for the Preservation of the public Peace in Ireland. (Repealed by Statute Law Revision Act (Northern Ireland) 1954 (c. 35 (N.I.)))
Local Taxation Returns (Scotland) Act 1881 (repealed)	44 & 45 Vict. c. 6	29 March 1881
Act to provide for an Annual Return of Rates, Taxes, Tolls, and Dues levied for local purposes in Scotland, (Repealed by Local Government (Scotland) Act 1947 (10 & 11 Geo. 6. c. 43))
India Office (Sale of Superfluous Land) Act 1881	44 & 45 Vict. c. 7	29 March 1881
An Act to authorise the Secretary of State for India in Council to sell a piece of land in Charles Street, Westminster, to the Commissioners of Her Majesty's Works and Public Buildings for the Public Service.
Consolidated Fund (No. 2) Act 1881 (repealed)	44 & 45 Vict. c. 8	29 March 1881
An Act to apply certain Sums out of the Consolidated Fund to the service of the years ending on the thirty-first day of March one thousand eight hundred and eighty, one thousand eight hundred and eighty-one, and one thousand eight hundred and eighty-two. (Repealed by Statute Law Revision Act 1894 (57 & 58 Vict. c. 56))
Army Discipline and Regulation (Annual) Act 1881 (repealed)	44 & 45 Vict. c. 9	8 April 1881
An Act to provide during twelve months for the Discipline and Regulation of the Army. (Repealed by Statute Law Revision Act 1894 (57 & 58 Vict. c. 56))
Inland Revenue Buildings Act 1881	44 & 45 Vict. c. 10	3 June 1881
An Act for the transfer of Property held for the Use and Service of the Inland Revenue to the Commissioners of Her Majesty's Works and Public Buildings; and for other purposes.
Sea Fisheries (Clam and Bait Beds) Act 1881 (repealed)	44 & 45 Vict. c. 11	3 June 1881
An Act to further amend the law relating to Sea Fisheries by providing for the protection of Clam and other Bait Beds. (Repealed for England and Wales by Sea Fisheries Regulation Act 1888 (51 & 52 Vict. c. 54) and for Scotland by Inshore Fishing (Scotland) Act 1984 (c. 26))
Customs and Inland Revenue Act 1881	44 & 45 Vict. c. 12	3 June 1881
An Act to grant certain Duties of Customs and Inland Revenue, to alter other Duties, and to amend the Laws relating to Customs and Inland Revenue.
Municipal Elections Amendment (Scotland) Act 1881 (repealed)	44 & 45 Vict. c. 13	3 June 1881
An Act to amend the Municipal Elections Amendment (Scotland) Act, 1868. (Note: Municipal Elections Amendment (Scotland) Act 1868 (31 & 32 Vict. c. 108)) (Repealed by Town Councils (Scotland) Act 1900 (63 & 64 Vict. c. 49))
South Wales Bridges Act 1881 (repealed)	44 & 45 Vict. c. 14	3 June 1881
An Act to enable County Authorities in South Wales to take over and contribute towards certain Bridges, and to remove doubts as to the liability to repair the Highways over and adjoining certain Bridges which have been rebuilt. (Repealed by Highways Act 1959 (7 & 8 Eliz. 2. c. 25))
Consolidated Fund (No. 3) Act 1881 (repealed)	44 & 45 Vict. c. 15	27 June 1881
An Act to apply the sum of Six million nine hundred and seventy-five thousand six hundred and twenty-seven pounds out of the Consolidated Fund to the service of the year ending on the thirty-first day of March one thousand eight hundred and eighty-two. (Repealed by Statute Law Revision Act 1894 (57 & 58 Vict. c. 56))
Land Tax Commissioners (Names) Act 1881 (repealed)	44 & 45 Vict. c. 16	27 June 1881
An Act to appoint additional Commissioners for executing the Acts for granting a Land Tax and other Rates and Taxes. (Repealed by Statute Law Revision Act 1950 (14 Geo. 6. c. 6))
Tramways (Ireland) Amendment Act 1881	44 & 45 Vict. c. 17	27 June 1881
An Act to amend the Tramways (Ireland) Acts, 1860, (Note: Tramways (Ireland) Act 1860 (23 & 24 Vict. c. 152)) 1861, (Note: Tramways (Ireland) Amendment Act 1861 (24 & 25 Vict. c. 102)) and 1871. (Note: Tramways (Ireland) Amendment Act 1871 (34 & 35 Vict. c. 114))
Petty Sessions Clerks (Ireland) Act 1881 (repealed)	44 & 45 Vict. c. 18	27 June 1881
An Act to amend the law with respect to the payment of Clerks of Petty Sessions in Ireland. (Repealed by Administration of Justice Act (Northern Ireland) 1954 (c. 9 (N.I.)))
Post Office (Newspaper) Act 1881 (repealed)	44 & 45 Vict. c. 19	18 July 1881
An Act for further regulating the Transmission of Newspapers. (Repealed by Post Office Act 1908 (8 Edw. 7. c. 48))
Post Office (Land) Act 1881 (repealed)	44 & 45 Vict. c. 20	18 July 1881
An Act to amend the Law with respect to the Acquisition of Land and the Execution of Instruments for the purposes of the Post Office. (Repealed by Post Office Act 1908 (8 Edw. 7. c. 48))
Married Women's Property (Scotland) Act 1881	44 & 45 Vict. c. 21	18 July 1881
An Act for the Amendment of the Law regarding Property of Married Women in Scotland.
Bankruptcy and Cessio (Scotland) Act 1881 (repealed)	44 & 45 Vict. c. 22	18 July 1881
An Act to amend the Bankruptcy Acts and Cessio Acts with respect to the discharge of Bankrupt Debtors in Scotland, and in certain other respects. (Repealed by Bankruptcy (Scotland) Act 1913 (3 & 4 Geo. 5. c. 20))
Court of Bankruptcy (Ireland) Officers and Clerks Act 1881 (repealed)	44 & 45 Vict. c. 23	18 July 1881
An Act to amend the Law relating to the Official Staff of the Court of Bankruptcy in Ireland. (Repealed by Statute Law Revision Act 1953 (2 & 3 Eliz. 2. c. 5))
Summary Jurisdiction (Process) Act 1881	44 & 45 Vict. c. 24	18 July 1881
An Act to amend the Law respecting the Service of Process of Courts of Summary Jurisdiction in England and Scotland.
Incumbents of Benefices Loans Extension Act 1881 (repealed)	44 & 45 Vict. c. 25	11 August 1881
An Act to extend for a period not exceeding Three Tears the term fixed for the Repayment of Loans granted by the Governors of the Bounty of Queen Anne for the Augmentation of the Maintenance of the Poor Clergy to Incumbents of Benefices. (Repealed by Statute Law (Repeals) Act 1971 (c. 52))
Stratified Ironstone Mines (Gunpowder) Act 1881 (repealed)	44 & 45 Vict. c. 26	11 August 1881
An Act to amend the Law relating to the use of Gunpowder in certain Stratified Ironstone Mines. (Repealed by Coal Mines Regulation Act 1887 (50 & 51 Vict. c. 58))
Burial Grounds (Scotland) Act 1855, Amendment Act 1881 (repealed)	44 & 45 Vict. c. 27	11 August 1881
An Act to amend the Burial Grounds (Scotland) Act, 1855. (Note: Burial Grounds (Scotland) Act 1855 (18 & 19 Vict. c. 68)) (Repealed by Burial Grounds (Scotland) Amendment Act 1886 (49 & 50 Vict. c. 21))
Local Government Board (Ireland) Amendment Act 1881	44 & 45 Vict. c. 28	11 August 1881
An Act to make provision for the payment by reduced Instalments of Loans under the Seed Supply (Ireland) Act, 1880; (Note: Seed Supply (Ireland) Act 1880 (43 Vict. c. 1)) and to amend and explain the Relief of Distress (Ireland) Amendment Act, 1880, (Note: Relief of Distress (Ireland) Amendment Act 1880 (43 & 44 Vict. c. 14)) and the Local Government Board (Ireland) Act, 1872. (Note: Local Government Board (Ireland) Act 1872 (35 & 36 Vict. c. 69))
Reformatory Institutions (Ireland) Act 1881 (repealed)	44 & 45 Vict. c. 29	11 August 1881
An Act further to facilitate the building, enlargement, and maintenance of Reformatory Institutions, in Ireland. (Repealed by Children Act 1908 (8 Edw. 7. c. 67))
Customs (Officers) Act 1881 (repealed)	44 & 45 Vict. c. 30	11 August 1881
An Act to provide for the employment of certain Officers and Clerks by the Commissioners of Customs. (Repealed by Statute Law Revision Act 1950 (14 Geo. 6. c. 6))
Annual Turnpike Acts Continuance Act 1881 (repealed)	44 & 45 Vict. c. 31	11 August 1881
An Act to continue certain Turnpike Acts, and to repeal certain other Turnpike Acts; and for other purposes connected therewith. (Repealed by Statute Law Revision Act 1894 (57 & 58 Vict. c. 56))
Public Loans (Ireland) Remission Act 1881 (repealed)	44 & 45 Vict. c. 32	11 August 1881
An Act to remit certain Loans formerly made out of the Consolidated Fund. (Repealed by Statute Law Revision Act 1894 (57 & 58 Vict. c. 56))
Summary Jurisdiction (Scotland) Act 1881 (repealed)	44 & 45 Vict. c. 33	11 August 1881
An Act to amend the Summary Procedure Act, 1864. (Note: Summary Procedure Act 1864 (27 & 28 Vict. c. 53)) (Repealed by Summary Jurisdiction (Scotland) Act 1908 (8 Edw. 7. c. 65))
Metropolitan Open Spaces Act 1881 (repealed)	44 & 45 Vict. c. 34	11 August 1881
An Act to amend the Metropolitan Open Spaces Act, 1877. (Note: Metropolitan Open Spaces Act 1877 (40 & 41 Vict. c. 35)) (Repealed by Open Spaces Act 1906 (6 Edw. 7. c. 25))
Coroners (Ireland) Act 1881 (repealed)	44 & 45 Vict. c. 35	11 August 1881
An Act to amend the Law relating to Coroners in Ireland. (Repealed by Coroners Act (Northern Ireland) 1959 (c. 15 (N.I.)))
British Honduras (Court of Appeal) Act 1881 (repealed)	44 & 45 Vict. c. 36	11 August 1881
An Act to authorise the establishment of a Court of Appeal for Her Majesty's Colony of British Honduras. (Repealed by British Caribbean Federation Act 1956 (4 & 5 Eliz. 2. c. 63))
Alkali, &c. Works Regulation Act 1881 (repealed)	44 & 45 Vict. c. 37	11 August 1881
An Act to consolidate the Alkali Acts, 1863 and 1874, and to make further provision for regulating Alkali and certain other works in which noxious or offensive gases are evolved. (Repealed by Alkali, &c. Works Regulation Act 1906 (6 Edw. 7. c. 14))
Public Works Loans Act 1881 (repealed)	44 & 45 Vict. c. 38	22 August 1881
An Act to grant Money for the purpose of Loans by the Public Works Loan Commissioners and the Commissioners of Public Works in Ireland; and for other purposes relating to Loans by those Commissioners. (Repealed by Statute Law (Repeals) Act 1989 (c. 43))
Removal Terms (Burghs) (Scotland) Act 1881 (repealed)	44 & 45 Vict. c. 39	22 August 1881
An Act to provide for uniform Terms of entry to and removal from Houses within Burghs in Scotland. (Repealed by Removal Terms (Scotland) Act 1886 (49 & 50 Vict. c. 50))
Universities Elections Amendment (Scotland) Act 1881 (repealed)	44 & 45 Vict. c. 40	22 August 1881
An Act to make farther provision in regard to the Registration of Parliamentary Voters, and also in regard to the taking of the Poll by means of Voting Papers, in the Universities of Scotland. (Repealed by Representation of the People Act 1918 (7 & 8 Geo. 5. c. 64))
Conveyancing Act 1881 or the Conveyancing and Law of Property Act 1881	44 & 45 Vict. c. 41	22 August 1881
An Act for simplifying and improving the practice of Conveyancing; and for vesting in Trustees, Mortgagees, and others various powers commonly conferred by provisions inserted in Settlements, Mortgages, Wills, and other Instruments; and for amending in various particulars the Law of Property; and for other purposes.
Corrupt Practices (Suspension of Elections) Act 1881 (repealed)	44 & 45 Vict. c. 42	22 August 1881
An Act to suspend for a limited period, on account of Corrupt Practices, the holding of an Election of a Member or Members to serve in Parliament for certain cities and boroughs. (Repealed by Statute Law Revision Act 1894 (57 & 58 Vict. c. 56))
Superannuation Act 1881 (repealed)	44 & 45 Vict. c. 43	22 August 1881
An Act to extend the Superannuation Act Amendment Act, 1873, (Note: Superannuation Act Amendment Act 1873 (36 & 37 Vict. c. 23)) to certain persons admitted into subordinate situations in the departments of the Postmaster-General, and the Commissioners of Her Majesty's Works and Public Buildings. (Repealed by Statute Law Revision Act 1950 (14 Geo. 6. c. 6))
Solicitors Remuneration Act 1881 (repealed)	44 & 45 Vict. c. 44	22 August 1881
An Act for making better provision respecting the Remuneration of Solicitors in Conveyancing and other non-contentious Business. (Repealed for England and Wales by Solicitors Act 1932 (22 & 23 Geo. 5. c. 37) and for Northern Ireland by Solicitors (Northern Ireland) Order 1976 (SI 1976/582 (N.I. 12)))
Pedlars Act 1881	44 & 45 Vict. c. 45	22 August 1881
An Act to amend the Pedlars Act, 1871, (Note: Pedlars Act 1871 (34 & 35 Vict. c. 96)) as regards the district within which a certificate authorises a person to act as Pedlar.
Patriotic Fund Act 1881 (repealed)	44 & 45 Vict. c. 46	22 August 1881
An Act to amend the Patriotic Fund Act, 1867, (Note: Patriotic Fund Act 1867 (30 & 31 Vict. c. 98)) and make further provision respecting certain Funds administered by the same Commissioners as the Patriotic Fund. (Repealed by Patriotic Fund Reorganisation Act 1903 (3 Edw. 7. c. 20))
Presumption of Life Limitation (Scotland) Act 1881 (repealed)	44 & 45 Vict. c. 47	22 August 1881
An Act to amend the Law as regards the Presumption of Life in persons long absent from Scotland. (Repealed by Presumption of Life Limitation (Scotland) Act 1891 (54 & 55 Vict. c. 29))
Metropolitan Board of Works (Money) Act 1881 (repealed)	44 & 45 Vict. c. 48	22 August 1881
An Act farther to amend the Acts relating to the raising of Money by the Metropolitan Board of Works; and for other purposes relating thereto. (Repealed by London County Council (Finance Consolidation) Act 1912 (2 & 3 Geo. 5. c. cv))
Land Law (Ireland) Act 1881 (repealed)	44 & 45 Vict. c. 49	22 August 1881
An Act to further amend the Law relating to the Occupation and Ownership of Land in Ireland, and for other purposes relating thereto. (Repealed by Property (Northern Ireland) Order 1997 (SI 1997/1179 (N.I. 8)))
Consolidated Fund (No. 4) Act 1881 (repealed)	44 & 45 Vict. c. 50	22 August 1881
An Act to apply the sum of Twenty-one million six hundred and ninety-five thousand seven hundred and twelve pounds out of the Consolidated Fund to the service of the year ending on the thirty-first day of March one thousand eight hundred and eighty-two. (Repealed by Statute Law Revision Act 1894 (57 & 58 Vict. c. 56))
Wild Birds Protection Act 1881 (repealed)	44 & 45 Vict. c. 51	22 August 1881
An Act to explain the Wild Birds Protection Act, 1880. (Note: Wild Birds Protection Act 1880 (43 & 44 Vict. c. 35)) (Repealed by Protection of Birds Act 1954 (2 & 3 Eliz. 2. c. 30))
Royal University of Ireland Act 1881 (repealed)	44 & 45 Vict. c. 52	22 August 1881
An Act for providing Funds to defray certain of the Expenses of the Royal University of Ireland. (Repealed by Queen's University of Belfast (Northern Ireland) Order 1981 (SI 1981/610 (N.I. 18)))
East Indian Railway (Redemption of Annuities) Act 1881 (repealed)	44 & 45 Vict. c. 53	22 August 1881
An Act for making further provision with respect to the Redemption of the Annuity created under the East Indian Railway Company Purchase Act, 1879; (Note: East Indian Railway Company Purchase Act 1879 (42 & 43 Vict. c. ccvi)) and for other purposes. (Repealed by East India Loans Act 1937 (1 Edw. 8 & 1 Geo. 6. c. 14))
Indian Loan Act 1881 (repealed)	44 & 45 Vict. c. 54	22 August 1881
An Act to make further provision with respect to the Indian Loan of 1879. (Repealed by National Debt Act 1884 (47 & 48 Vict. c. 2) and Statute Law Revision Act 1894 (57 & 58 Vict. c. 56))
National Debt Act 1881 (repealed)	44 & 45 Vict. c. 55	22 August 1881
An Act to make further provision respecting the National Debt and the Investment of Moneys in the hands of the National Debt Commissioners on account of Savings Banks and otherwise. (Repealed by National Debt and Local Loans Act 1887 (50 & 51 Vict. c. 16), Savings Banks Act 1904 (4 Edw. 7. c. 8), Finance Act 1942 (5 & 6 Geo. 6. c. 21) and Statute Law Revision Act 1950 (14 Geo. 6. c. 6))
Appropriation Act 1881 (repealed)	44 & 45 Vict. c. 56	27 August 1881
An Act to apply a sum out of the Consolidated Fund to the Service of the year ending on the thirty-first day of March one thousand eight hundred and eighty-two, and to appropriate the Supplies granted in this Session of Parliament. (Repealed by Statute Law Revision Act 1894 (57 & 58 Vict. c. 56))
Regulation of the Forces Act 1881 (repealed)	44 & 45 Vict. c. 57	27 August 1881
An Act to amend the Law respecting the Regulation of Her Majesty's Forces, and to amend the Army Discipline and Regulation Act, 1879. (Note: Army Discipline and Regulation Act 1879 (42 & 43 Vict. c. 33)) (Repealed by Statute Law Revision Act 1966 (c. 5))
Army Act 1881 (repealed)	44 & 45 Vict. c. 58	27 August 1881
An Act to consolidate the Army Discipline and Regulation Act, 1879, and the subsequent Acts amending the same. (Repealed by Statute Law (Repeals) Act 2008 (c. 12))
Statute Law Revision and Civil Procedure Act 1881 (repealed)	44 & 45 Vict. c. 59	27 August 1881
An Act for promoting the revision of the Statute Law by repealing various enactments chiefly relating to Civil Procedure or matters connected therewith, and for amending in some respects the law relating to Civil Procedure. (Repealed by Statute Law (Repeals) Act 1989 (c. 43))
Newspaper Libel and Registration Act 1881	44 & 45 Vict. c. 60	27 August 1881
An Act to amend the Law of Newspaper Libel, and to provide for the Registration of Newspaper Proprietors.
Sunday Closing (Wales) Act 1881 (repealed)	44 & 45 Vict. c. 61	27 August 1881
An Act to prohibit the Sale of Intoxicating Liquors on Sunday in Wales. (Repealed by Licensing (Consolidation) Act 1910 (10 Edw. 7 & 1 Geo. 5. c. 24))
Veterinary Surgeons Act 1881 (repealed)	44 & 45 Vict. c. 62	27 August 1881
An Act to amend the Law relating to Veterinary Surgeons. (Repealed by Veterinary Surgeons Act 1966 (c. 36))
India Office Auditor Act 1881 (repealed)	44 & 45 Vict. c. 63	27 August 1881
An Act for providing a Superannuation Allowance for the Auditor of the Accounts of the Secretary of State for India in Council and his Assistants. (Repealed by Government of India Act 1915 (5 & 6 Geo. 5. c. 61))
Central Criminal Court (Prisons) Act 1881 (repealed)	44 & 45 Vict. c. 64	27 August 1881
An Act to remove certain doubts as to the application of section twenty-four of the Prison Act, 1877, (Note: Prison Act 1877 (40 & 41 Vict. c. 21)) and enactments amending the same, to the Central Criminal Court district. (Repealed by Statute Law (Repeals) Act 2004 (c. 14))
Leases for Schools (Ireland) Act 1881	44 & 45 Vict. c. 65	27 August 1881
An Act to facilitate leases of land for the erection thereon of Schools and Buildings for the promotion of Public Education in Ireland.
Pollen Fishing (Ireland) Act 1881 (repealed)	44 & 45 Vict. c. 66	27 August 1881
An Act to amend the Law regulating the Close Season for fishing for Pollen in Ireland. (Repealed by Fisheries Act (Northern Ireland) 1966 (c. 17 (N.I.)))
Petroleum (Hawkers) Act 1881 (repealed)	44 & 45 Vict. c. 67	27 August 1881
An Act to regulate the hawking of petroleum and other substances of a like nature. (Repealed for England and Wales and Scotland by Petroleum Act 1926 (16 & 17 Geo. 5. c. 25) and for Northern Ireland by Petroleum (Amendment) Act (Northern Ireland) 1929 (19 Geo. 5. c. 8 (N.I.)))
Supreme Court of Judicature Act 1881 (repealed)	44 & 45 Vict. c. 68	27 August 1881
An Act to amend the Supreme Court of Judicature Acts; and for other purposes. (Repealed by Administration of Justice Act 1977 (c. 38))
Fugitive Offenders Act 1881 (repealed)	44 & 45 Vict. c. 69	27 August 1881
An Act to amend the Law with respect to Fugitive Offenders in Her Majesty's Dominions, and for other Purposes connected with the Trial of Offenders. (Repealed by Fugitive Offenders Act 1967 (c. 68))
Expiring Laws Continuance Act 1881 (repealed)	44 & 45 Vict. c. 70	27 August 1881
An Act to continue various expiring Laws. (Repealed by Statute Law Revision Act 1894 (57 & 58 Vict. c. 56))
Irish Church Act Amendment Act 1881 (repealed)	44 & 45 Vict. c. 71	27 August 1881
An Act to make provision for the future administration of the Property and the performance of the Duties vested in the Commissioners of Church Temporalities in Ireland. (Repealed by Statute Law Revision (Northern Ireland) Act 1980 (c. 59))
Highways (Isle of Wight) Act 1881 (repealed)	44 & 45 Vict. c. 72	27 August 1881
An Act to amend certain provisions of the Highways and Locomotives (Amendment) Act, 1878. (Note: Highways and Locomotives (Amendment) Act 1878 (41 & 42 Vict. c. 77)) (Repealed by Local Government Act 1888 (51 & 52 Vict. c. 41))

=== Local acts ===
Short title	Citation	Royal assent
Long title
Local Government Board's Provisional Orders Confirmation (Godalming, &c.) Act 1881	44 & 45 Vict. c. i	29 March 1881
An Act to confirm certain Provisional Orders of the Local Government Board relating to the Borough of Godalming, the Improvement Act District of Lytham, and the Borough of Stratford-upon-Avon.
	Godalming Order 1881 Provisional Order for repealing a Local Act. (Note: Godalming Improvement Act 1825 (6 Geo. 4. c. clxxvii))	
	Lytham Order 1881 Provisional Order amending a Local Act, (Note: Lytham Improvement Act 1847 (10 & 11 Vict. c. ccli)) and a Confirming Act. (Note: Local Government Board's Provisional Orders Confirmation Act 1874 (No. 4) (37 & 38 Vict. c. clii))	
	Stratford-upon-Avon Order 1881 Provisional Order for partially repealing and altering a Local Act. (Note: Stratford-upon-Avon Borough Act 1879 (42 & 43 Vict. c. cxix))	
Cambridge University and Town Gas Act 1881	44 & 45 Vict. c. ii	29 March 1881
An Act to authorise the Cambridge University and Town Gaslight Company to acquire additional land and erect additional gasworks, and to raise further money.
Local Government Board (Ireland) Provisional Orders Confirmation (Clonakilty, &c.) Act 1881	44 & 45 Vict. c. iii	8 April 1881
An Act to confirm certain Provisional Orders of the Local Government Board for Ireland relating to the towns of Clonakilty, Dromore, and Navan.
	Clonakilty Provisional Order 1880 Town of Clonakilty. Provisional Order.	
	Town of Dromore Provisional Order 1880 (Note: Although passed in 1881, the short title is specified as the Town of Dromore Provisional Order 1880.) Town of Dromore. Provisional Order.	
	Navan Provisional Order 1880 (Note: Although passed in 1881, the short title is specified as the Navan Provisional Order 1880.) Town of Navan. Provisional Order.	
Tuckton Bridge Act 1881 (repealed)	44 & 45 Vict. c. iv	8 April 1881
An Act for making and maintaining a Road and Bridge across the River Stour in the Parish of Christchurch and County of Southampton. (Repealed by Bournemouth Borough Council Act 1985 (c. v))
Lydd Railway Act 1881	44 & 45 Vict. c. v	8 April 1881
An Act for making a Railway from Appledore to Lydd, in the county of Kent, and for other purposes.
Hancock's Patent Act 1881	44 & 45 Vict. c. vi	8 April 1881
An Act for rendering valid certain Letters Patent granted to James Hancock for Improvements in Bobbin Net or Twist Lace Machines.
Australian Agricultural Company's Act 1881 (repealed)	44 & 45 Vict. c. vii	8 April 1881
An Act to authorise the Australian Agricultural Company to borrow further moneys on debenture. (Repealed by Australian Agricultural Company Act 1912 (2 & 3 Geo. 5. c. xlviii))
Hylton, Southwick and Monkwearmouth Railway Act 1881	44 & 45 Vict. c. viii	8 April 1881
An Act for increasing the Capital of the Hylton Southwick and Monkwearmouth Railway Company and for other purposes.
Manchester, Sheffield and Lincolnshire Railway Act 1881	44 & 45 Vict. c. ix	8 April 1881
An Act for conferring additional powers on the Manchester Sheffield and Lincolnshire Railway Company and for other purposes.
Colonial Company Act 1881	44 & 45 Vict. c. x	8 April 1881
An Act for regulating the Capital of the Colonial Company Limited and for other purposes.
Caledonian Railway (Guaranteed Annuities Stock No. 2) Act 1881	44 & 45 Vict. c. xi	8 April 1881
An Act to provide for the Dissolution of the Lesmahagow Railways Guaranteed Company, the Dundee and Perth and Aberdeen Railway Junction Company, and the Forth and Clyde Navigation Guaranteed Company, and for the Conversion of the Stocks of those Companies into Annuities Stock of the Caledonian Railway Company; and for other purposes.
Ramsey and Somersham Junction Railway Act 1881	44 & 45 Vict. c. xii	8 April 1881
An Act to extend the time limited for the compulsory purchase of Lands and completion of the Railway and Works authorised by the Ramsey and Somersham Junction Railway Acts 1875 (Note: Ramsey and Somersham Junction Railway Act 1875 (38 & 39 Vict. c. ccxii)) and 1878 (Note: Ramsey and Somersham Junction Railway Act 1878 (41 & 42 Vict. c. cxliii)) and for other purposes.
Cleveland Mineral Railway Act 1881	44 & 45 Vict. c. xiii	8 April 1881
An Act to revive and extend the Powers of the Cleveland Extension Mineral Railway Company.
Liverpool City Police Superannuation Act 1881 (repealed)	44 & 45 Vict. c. xiv	8 April 1881
An Act to make further Provisions with respect to the Police Superannua tion Fund of the City of Liverpool and for other purposes. (Repealed by Liverpool Corporation Act 1921 (11 & 12 Geo. 5. c. lxxiv))
Local Government Board's Provisional Orders Confirmation (Bath, &c.) Act 1881	44 & 45 Vict. c. xv	3 June 1881
An Act to confirm certain Provisional Orders of the Local Government Board relating to the City and Borough of Bath, the Local Government District of Bowness, the Improvement Act District of Cambridge, the Borough of Derby, the Port of Hartlepool, and the Local Government District of Wigton.
	Bath Order 1881 Provisional Order to enable the Urban Sanitary Authority for the City and Borough of Bath to put in force the Compulsory Clauses of the Lands Clauses Consolidation Acts, 1845, (Note: Lands Clauses Consolidation Act 1845 (8 & 9 Vict. c. 18)) 1860, (Note: Lands Clauses Consolidation Acts Amendment Act 1860 (23 & 24 Vict. c. 106)) and 1869. (Note: Lands Clauses Consolidation Act 1869 (32 & 33 Vict. c. 18))	
	Bowness Order 1881 Provisional Order to enable the Sanitary Authority for the Urban Sanitary District of Bowness to put in force the Compulsory Clauses of the Lands Clauses Consolidation Acts, 1845, 1860, and 1869.	
	Cambridge Order 1881 Provisional Order for partially repealing and altering certain Local Acts. (Note: Cambridge Improvement Act 1788 (28 Geo. 3. c. 64)) (Note: Cambridge Improvement Act 1794 (34 Geo. 3. c. 104))	
	Derby Order 1881 Provisional Order to enable the Urban Sanitary Authority for the Borough of Derby to put in forcc the Compulsory Clauses of the Lands Clauses Consolidation Acts, 1845, 1860, and 1869.	
	Port of Hartlepool Order 1881 Provisional Order for permanently constituting a Port Sanitary Authority, and for other purposes.	
	Wigton Order 1881 Provisional Order to enable the Sanitary Authority for the Urban Sanitary District. of Wigton to put in force the Compulsory Clauses of the Lands Clauses Consolidation Acts, 1845, 1860, and 1869.	
Local Government Board's (Highways) Provisional Order Confirmation (York, E. R.) Act 1881	44 & 45 Vict. c. xvi	3 June 1881
An Act to confirm a Provisional Order of the Local Government Board under the Highways and Locomotives (Amendment) Act, 1878, (Note: Highways and Locomotives (Amendment) Act 1878 (41 & 42 Vict. c. 77)) relating to the East Riding of the county of York.
	York (East Riding) Order 1881 Provisional Order as to a certain Disturnpiked Road. (Note: The road leading from Selby, through Bubwith, to Market Weighton.)	
Local Government Board's Provisional Orders Confirmation (Poor Law) Act 1881	44 & 45 Vict. c. xvii	3 June 1881
An Act to confirm certain Orders of the Local Government Board under the provisions of the Divided Parishes and Poor Law Amendment Act, 1876, (Note: Divided Parishes and Poor Law Amendment Act 1876 (39 & 40 Vict. c. 61)) as amended and extended by the Poor Law Act, 1879, (Note: Poor Law Act 1879 (42 & 43 Vict. c. 54)) relating to the Parishes of Asgarby, Bolingbroke, Boston, Carrington, Chesilborne, Frieston, Hagnaby, Hareby, Hundleby, Keal West, Leverton, Lusby, Mavis Enderby, Milton Abbas, Miningsby, Owermoigne, Reithby, Revesby, Spilsby, Stickford, and Thorpe, and to the Townships of Asselby, Balkholme, Barmby-on-the-Marsh, Bellasize, Blacktoft, Cotness, Eastrington, Gilberdike, Kendal, Kilpin, Knedlington, Laxton, Metham, Nether Graveship, Saltmarsh, Skelton, and Yokefleet.
	Chesilborne and Milton Abbas Order 1881 Blandford and Cerne Unions.	
	Milton Abbas and Owermoigne Order 1881 Blandford and Weymouth Unions.	
	Asgarby, Bolingbroke, Boston, Carrington, Minningsby, and Revesby Order 1881 Boston, Horncastle, and Spilsby Unions.	
	West Fen Order 1881 Boston and Spilsby Unions.	
	Keal West, Lusby, Spilsby, and Stickford Order 1881 Horncastle and Spilsby Unions.	
	Hagnaby and Thorpe Order 1881 Spilsby Union.	
	Bishopsoil Order 1881 Howden Union.	
	Balkholme, Eastrington, Kilpin, Saltmarsh, and Skelton Order 1881 Howden Union.	
	Kendal and Nether Graveship Order 1881 Kendal Union.	
Metropolitan Commons Supplemental Act 1881	44 & 45 Vict. c. xviii	3 June 1881
An Act to confirm a Scheme under the Metropolitan Commons Act, 1866, (Note: Metropolitan Commons Act 1866 (29 & 30 Vict. c. 122)) and the Metropolitan Commons Amendment Act, 1869, (Note: Metropolitan Commons Amendment Act 1869 (32 & 33 Vict. c. 107)) relating to Brook Green, Eel Brook Common, Parson's Green, and another piece of waste land adjoining the King's Road.
	Scheme with respect to Brook Green, Eel Brook Common, Parson's Green, and a narrow piece of waste land adjoining the King's Road.	
Commons Regulation (Langbar Moor) Provisional Order Confirmation Act 1881	44 & 45 Vict. c. xix	3 June 1881
An Act to confirm the Provisional Order for the Regulation of certain lands known as Langbar Moor, situate in the township of Nesfield-with-Langbar, in the parish of Ilkley, in the county of York, in pursuance of a report of the Inclosure Commissioners for England and Wales.
	Langbar Moor Order 1881 Provisional Order for the Regulation of a Common.	
Commons Regulation (Beamsley Moor) Provisional Order Confirmation Act 1881	44 & 45 Vict. c. xx	3 June 1881
An Act to confirm the Provisional Order for the Regulation of certain lands known as Beamsley Moor, situate in the township of Beamsleys Both, in the parish of Skipton, in the county of York, in pursuance of the report of the Inclosure Commissioners for England and Wales.
	Beamsley Moor Order 1881 Provisional Order for the Regulation of a Common.	
Inclosure (Scotton and Ferry Common) Provisional Orders Confirmation Act 1881	44 & 45 Vict. c. xxi	3 June 1881
An Act to confirm the Provisional Orders for the Inclosure of certain lands called or known as Scotton and Ferry Common, situate in the parish of Scotton, in the county of Lincoln, in pursuance of a report of the Inclosure Commissioners for England and Wales.
	Scotton and Ferry Common Order 1881 (1) Provisional Order for the Regulation of a Common.	
	Scotton and Ferry Common Order 1881 (2) Order modifying the foregoing Provisional Order.	
Inclosure (Wibsey Slack and Low Moor Commons) Provisional Order Confirmation Act 1881	44 & 45 Vict. c. xxii	3 June 1881
An Act to confirm the Provisional Order for the Inclosure of certain lands called or known as Wibsey Slack and Low Moor Commons, situate in the township of North Bierley, in the parish of Bradford, in the county of York, in pursuance of a report of the Inclosure Commissioners for England and Wales.
	Wibsey Slack and Low Moor Commons Order 1881 Provisional Order for the Regulation of a Common.	
North and South Woolwich Subway Act 1881	44 & 45 Vict. c. xxiii	3 June 1881
An Act to further extend the time for the completion of the North and South Woolwich Subway.
Brading Harbour Improvement, Railway and Works (Additional Powers) Act 1881	44 & 45 Vict. c. xxiv	3 June 1881
An Act for reviving the powers and extending the time for the completion of a portion of the Railway and Works authorised by the Brading Harbour Improvement Railway and Works Act 1874 (Note: Brading Harbour Improvement Railway and Works Act 1874 (37 & 38 Vict. c. cxcv)) and for other purposes.
Metropolitan Railway Act 1881	44 & 45 Vict. c. xxv	3 June 1881
An Act to authorise the Metropolitan Railway Company to make part of Railway No. 1 authorised by the Metropolitan and District (City Lines and Extensions) Act 1879 (Note: Metropolitan and District Railways (City Lines and Extensions) Act 1879 (42 & 43 Vict. c. cci)) to make Agreements with respect to the widening of part of the Saint John's Wood Railway and to raise additional Capital also to authorise that company and the Great Western Railway Company to purchase additional Lands and for other purposes.
Sheffield Waterworks Act 1881 (repealed)	44 & 45 Vict. c. xxvi	3 June 1881
An Act to extend and amend enactments relating to the Company of Proprietors of the Sheffield Waterworks and for other purposes. (Repealed by Sheffield Corporation (Consolidation) Act 1918 (8 & 9 Geo. 5. c. lxi))
Westgate and Birchington Gas Act 1881	44 & 45 Vict. c. xxvii	3 June 1881
An Act for incorporating the Westgate and Birchington Gas Company and conferring powers on them with reference to the construction and maintenance of works the supply of Gas and otherwise; and for other purposes.
Paisley Waterworks Act 1881	44 & 45 Vict. c. xxviii	3 June 1881
An Act to authorise the Paisley Waterworks Commissioners to construct additional works; and for other purposes.
Byker Bridge (Newcastle-upon-Tyne) Act 1881	44 & 45 Vict. c. xxix	3 June 1881
An Act to enable the Byker Bridge Company (Newcastle-upon-Tyne) to raise additional Capital and to acquire Land.
Sevenoaks Gas Act 1881	44 & 45 Vict. c. xxx	3 June 1881
An Act for conferring additional powers upon the Sevenoaks Gas Company, and for other purposes.
Canada Company's Amendment Act 1881 (repealed)	44 & 45 Vict. c. xxxi	3 June 1881
An Act to amend the Canada Company's Act of 1856, (Note: Canada Company's Amendment Act 1856 (19 & 20 Vict. c. 23)) and to confer further powers upon the Company, and for other purposes relating thereto. (Repealed by Canada Company Act 1916 (6 & 7 Geo. 5. c. xiv))
Fylde Waterworks Act 1881	44 & 45 Vict. c. xxxii	3 June 1881
An Act to confer further powers upon the Fylde Waterworks Company; and for other purposes.
London and Blackwall Railway (Extension of Time) Act 1881	44 & 45 Vict. c. xxxiii	3 June 1881
An Act to extend the time for completing certain works in connexion with the London and Blackwall Railway.
Penarth, Sully and Barry Railway (Amendment) Act 1881	44 & 45 Vict. c. xxxiv	3 June 1881
An Act for the Abandonment of the Penarth, Sully, and Barry Railway.
Richmond Gas Act 1881	44 & 45 Vict. c. xxxv	3 June 1881
An Act for enabling the Richmond Gas Company to raise additional Capital, to enlarge their Works, and for other purposes.
Crystal Palace Company's Act 1881 (repealed)	44 & 45 Vict. c. xxxvi	3 June 1881
An Act for making further provision respecting the Capital and Undertaking of the Crystal Palace Company and for other purposes. (Repealed by London County Council (Crystal Palace) Act 1951 (14 & 15 Geo. 6. c. xxviii))
Great Eastern and East Norfolk Railways Act 1881	44 & 45 Vict. c. xxxvii	3 June 1881
An Act for authorising the sale or transfer to the Great Eastern Railway Company of the Undertaking of the East Norfolk Railway Company; and for other purposes.
North Level and Nene Outfall Act 1881	44 & 45 Vict. c. xxxviii	3 June 1881
An Act to incorporate the North Level Commissioners and to enable them to lay an additional tax on lands within their district and to borrow further money to amend the Nene Outfall Acts and for other purposes.
Oxford Police Act 1881 (repealed)	44 & 45 Vict. c. xxxix	3 June 1881
An Act for continuing and maintaining a United Constabulary Force in and for the University and City of Oxford. (Repealed by Oxfordshire Act 1985 (c. xxxiv))
Coventry Canal Navigation Act 1881	44 & 45 Vict. c. xl	3 June 1881
An Act to amend the Acts relating to the Company of Proprietors of the Coventry Canal Navigation; and for other purposes.
Railway Passengers Assurance Act 1881 (repealed)	44 & 45 Vict. c. xli	3 June 1881
An Act for extending the Powers of the Railway Passengers Assurance Company, and enabling them to grant Insurances against Liability for Compensation in respect of Death or Injury occasioned by Accident; and for other purposes. (Repealed by Railway Passengers Assurance (Consolidation) Act 1892 (55 & 56 Vict. c. viii))
Ruthin and Cerrig-y-Druidion Railway (Amendment) Act 1881 (repealed)	44 & 45 Vict. c. xlii	3 June 1881
An Act to revive the powers of the Ruthin and Cerrig-y-druidion Railway Company for the compulsory Purchase of Lands for making and to extend the time for completing the Railway authorised by the Ruthin and Cerrig-y-druidion Railway Act, 1876. (Note: Ruthin and Cerrig-y-druidion Railway Act 1876 (39 & 40 Vict. c. lxxxi)) (Repealed by Statute Law (Repeals) Act 2013 (c. 2))
Great Northern Railway (Ireland) Act 1881	44 & 45 Vict. c. xliii	3 June 1881
An Act to enable the Great Northern Railway Company (Ireland) to extend their Railway to Carrickmacross in the county of Monaghan and to Belturbet in the county of Cavan and for other purposes.
Hexham Gas Act 1881	44 & 45 Vict. c. xliv	3 June 1881
An Act to re incorporate with further Powers the Hexham Gaslight Company Limited.
St. Helens and District Tramways (Extension of Time) Act 1881 (repealed)	44 & 45 Vict. c. xlv	3 June 1881
An Act to extend the time for the completion of certain of the Tramways authorised by the Saint Helens and District Tramways Act 1879. (Note: Saint Helens and District Tramways Act 1879 (42 & 43 Vict. c. cxcii)) (Repealed by County of Merseyside Act 1980 (c. x))
Gosport Street Tramways Act 1881	44 & 45 Vict. c. xlvi	3 June 1881
An Act for empowering the Gosport Street Tramways Company to extend their authorised Tramways and for other purposes.
London and North Western and Midland Railways (Market Harborough Line) Act 1881	44 & 45 Vict. c. xlvii	3 June 1881
An Act for empowering the London and North-western and the Midland Railway Companies to make a new Railway and other Works at Market Harborough and for other purposes.
Cleator and Workington Junction Railway Act 1881	44 & 45 Vict. c. xlviii	3 June 1881
An Act to confer further powers upon the Cleator and Workington Junction Railway Company for the extension of their railways and for other purposes.
Mersey Docks Act 1881 (repealed)	44 & 45 Vict. c. xlix	3 June 1881
An Act for authorising the Mersey Docks and Harbour Board to acquire and work vessels for the pilotage service of the port of Liverpool to borrow moneys for that purpose and to make byelaws for regulating the division amongst pilots of pilotage earnings and for altering the times of vacation of office by members of the Board and the times of nomination election and appointment of new members. (Repealed by Mersey Docks and Harbour Board Act 1971 (c. x))
Eastbourne Waterworks Act 1881	44 & 45 Vict. c. l	3 June 1881
An Act for extending the limits of supply of the Eastbourne Waterworks Company and for conferring further powers on the Company for the construction of works the raising of money and otherwise in relation to their undertaking and for other purposes.
Penarth Harbour, Dock and Railway Act 1881	44 & 45 Vict. c. li	3 June 1881
An Act to empower the Penarth Harbour Dock and Railway Company to extend their existing Dock and to execute other works in connexion therewith and to raise additional capital; and for other purposes.
Tyne Improvement Act 1881 (repealed)	44 & 45 Vict. c. lii	3 June 1881
An Act for modifying the provisions relating to the completion of works; the borrowing and repayment of money; the application of dues and sums received by the Tyne Improvement Commissioners; and for other purposes. (Repealed by Port of Tyne Reorganisation Scheme 1967 Confirmation Order 1968 (SI 1968/942))
Hyde Gas Act 1881	44 & 45 Vict. c. liii	3 June 1881
An Act for conferring additional powers upon the Hyde Gas Company; and for other purposes.
Burry Port and North Western Junction Railway Amendment Act 1881 (repealed)	44 & 45 Vict. c. liv	3 June 1881
An Act to confer further powers on the Burry Port and North-western Junction Railway Company; and for other purposes. (Repealed by Burry Port and North Western Junction Railway (Abandonment) Act 1889 (52 & 53 Vict. c. cliii))
Metropolitan and District Railways (City Lines and Extensions) Act 1881	44 & 45 Vict. c. lv	3 June 1881
An Act to extend the time for purchasing Lands and completing the Metropolitan City Lines and Extensions.
Alnwick Gas Act 1881	44 & 45 Vict. c. lvi	3 June 1881
An Act for incorporating and conferring powers on the Alnwick Gas Company.
West Lancashire Railway Act 1881	44 & 45 Vict. c. lvii	3 June 1881
An Act to enable the West Lancashire Railway Company to purchase certain lands in the county of Lancaster and a branch railway or siding known as the Tarleton Branch Railway to raise further moneys and to confer further powers in relation to their undertaking on the Company and for other purposes.
Milford Haven Dock and Railway Act 1881	44 & 45 Vict. c. lviii	3 June 1881
An Act to enable the Milford Haven Dock and Railway Company to lease their Railway and Pier undertaking and for other purposes.
Burton-upon-Trent (Station Street Extension) Railway Act 1881	44 & 45 Vict. c. lix	3 June 1881
An Act to authorise the construction of a Railway at Burton-upon-Trent by Messieurs Worthington and Company; and for other purposes.
Kirkcaldy and Dysart Waterworks (Additional Powers) Act 1881 (repealed)	44 & 45 Vict. c. lx	3 June 1881
An Act for providing an additional supply of water to Kirkcaldy and Dysart and suburbs and places adjacent; and for other purposes. (Repealed by Kirkcaldy Corporation Order Confirmation Act 1939 (2 & 3 Geo. 6. c. vi))
Local Government Board's Provisional Orders Confirmation (Berwick-upon-Tweed, &c.) Act 1881	44 & 45 Vict. c. lxi	27 June 1881
An Act to confirm certain Provisional Orders of the Local Government Board relating to the Boroughs of Berwick-upon-Tweed and Cheltenham, the Urban Sanitary District of Folkestone, the Rural Sanitary District of the Hendon Union, the Metropolis and the Local Government Districts of Redruth, Swinton, and Willington.
	Berwick-upon-Tweed Order 1881 Provisional Order to enable the Urban Sanitary Authority for the Borough of Berwick-upon-Tweed to put in force the Compulsory Clauses of the Lands Clauses Consolidation Acts, 1845, 1860, and 1869.	
	Cheltenham Order 1881 Provisional Order to enable the Urban Sanitary Authority for the Borough of Cheltenham to put in force the Compulsory Clauses of the Lands Clauses Consolidation Acts, 1845, 1860, and 1869.	
	Folkestone Order 1881 Provisional Order for altering The Folkestone Improvement Act, 1855. (Note: Folkestone Improvement Act 1855 (18 & 19 Vict. c. cxlvii))	
	Hendon Union Order 1881 Provisional Order to enable the Sanitary Authority for the Rural Sanitary District of the Hendon Union to put in force the Compulsory Clauses of the Lands Clauses Consolidation Acts, 1845, 1860, and 1869.	
	Metropolis Order 1881 Provisional Order to enable the Local Authority in and for the Metropolis, for the purposes of the provisions of the Contagious Discases (Animals) Act, 1878, (Note: Contagious Discases (Animals) Act 1878 (41 & 42 Vict. c. 74)) relating to foreign animals, to put in force the Compulsory Clauses of the Lands Clauses Consolidation Acts, 1845, 1860, and 1869.	
	Redruth Order 1881 Provisional Order to enable the Sanitary Authority for the Urban Sanitary District of Redruth to put in force the Compulsory Clauses of the Lands Clauses Consolidation Acts, 1845, 1860, and 1869.	
	Swinton Order 1881 Provisional Order to enable the Sanitary Authority for the Urban Sanitary District of Swinton to put in force the Compulsory Clauses of the Lands Clauses Consolidation Acts, 1845, 1860, and 1869.	
	Willington Order 1881 Provisional Order for constituting a Local Government District.	
Local Government Board's Provisional Orders Confirmation (Poor Law No. 2) Act 1881	44 & 45 Vict. c. lxii	27 June 1881
An Act to confirm certain Orders of the Local Government Board under the provisions of the Divided Parishes and Poor Law Amendment Act, 1876, as amended and extended by the Poor Law Act, 1879, relating to the Parishes of Bromsgrove, Claines, Dodderhill, Grafton Manor, Hadsor, Hampton Lovett, Hanbury, Hinlip, In-Liberties, Pelhams Lands, Saint Andrew, Saint Nicholas, Saint Peter, Salwarpe, Swineshead, Upton Warren, and Warndon.
	Pelhams Lands and Swineshead Order 1881 Boston Union.	
	Bromsgrove, Dodderhill, Grafton Manor, and Upper Warren Order 1881 Bromsgrove Union.	
	Claines, Dodderhill, Hadsor, Hampton Lovett, Hanbury, Hinlip, In Liberties, St. Andrew, St. Nicholas, St. Peter, Salwarpe, and Warndon Order 1881 Droitwich Union.	
Local Government Board's Provisional Orders Confirmation (Brentford Union, &c.) Act 1881	44 & 45 Vict. c. lxiii	27 June 1881
An Act to confirm certain Provisional Orders of the Local Government Board relating to the Rural Sanitary District of the Brentford Union, the Bromley and Beckenham Joint Hospital District, the Local Government District of Burgess Hill, the Rural Sanitary District of the Cuckfield Union, the Local Government District of Houghton-le-Spring, the Special Drainage District of Hurstpierpoint, the Local Government District of Marple, the Stourbridge Main Drainage District, and the Rural Sanitary District of the Whitehaven Union.
	Brentford Union Order 1881 Provisional Order to enable the Sanitary Authority for the Rural Sanitary District of the Brentford Union to put in force the Compulsory Clauses of the Lands Clauses Consolidation Acts, 1845, 1860, and 1869.	
	Bromley and Beckenham Joint Hospital Order 1881 Provisional Order for forming a United District under Sect. 279 of the Public Hcalth Act, 1875. (Note: Public Hcalth Act 1875 (38 & 39 Vict. c. 55))	
	Burgess Hill Order 1881 Provisional Order to enable the Sanitary Authority for the Urban Sanitary District of Burgess Hill, to put in force the Compulsory Clauses of the Lands Clauses Consolidation Acts, 1845, 1860, and 1869.	
	Cuckfield Union Order 1881 Provisional Order to enable the Sanitary Authority for the Rural Sanitary District of the Cuckfield Union to put in force the Compulsory Clauses of the Lands Clauses Consolidation Acts, 1845, 1860, and 1869.	
	Houghton-le-Spring Order 1881 Provisional Order to enable the Sanitary Authority for the Urban Sanitary District of Houghton-le-Spring to put in force the Compulsory Clauses of the Lands. Clauses Consolidation Acts, 1845, 1860, and 1869.	
	Hurtspierpoint Order 1881 Provisional Order for dissolving the Special Drainage District of Hurstpierpoint.	
	Marple Order 1881 Provisional Order to enable the Sanitary Authority for the Urban Sanitary District of Marple to put in force the Compulsory Clauses of the Lands Clauses Consolidation Acts, 1845, 1860, and 1869.	
	Stourbridge Main Drainage Order 1881 Provisional Order for forming a United District under Sect. 279 of the Public Health Act, 1875.	
	Whitehaven Union Order 1881 Provisional Order for altering the Arlecdon and Frizinyton Water Act, 1879. (Note: Arlecdon and Frizington Water Act 1879 (42 & 43 Vict. c. cxxxi))	
Education Department Provisional Order Confirmation (Clay Lane) Act 1881	44 & 45 Vict. c. lxiv	27 June 1881
An Act to confirm a Provisional Order made by the Education Department under the Elementary Education Act, 1870, (Note: Elementary Education Act 1870 (33 & 34 Vict. c. 75)) to enable the School Board for the United School District of Clay Lane, Derby, to put in force the Lands Clauses Consolidation Act, 1845, and the Acts amending the same.
	Clay Lane Order 1881 The School Board for the United School District of Clay Lane, County of Derby. Provisional Order for putting in force the Lands Clauses Consolidation Act, 1845.	
Local Government Board (Ireland) Provisional Orders Confirmation (Bandon, &c.) Act 1881	44 & 45 Vict. c. lxv	27 June 1881
An Act to confirm certain Provisional Orders of the Local Government Board for Ireland relating to Waterworks in the towns of Bandon and Bangor, and in the Little Island in the county of Cork.
	Bandon Waterworks Provisional Order 1881 Bandon Waterworks. Provisional Order.	
	Bangor Waterworks Provisional Order 1881 Town of Bangor. Provisional Order.	
	Little Island Provisional Order 1881 Little Island Waterworks. Provisional Order.	
Local Government Board's Provisional Orders Confirmation (Halifax, &c.) Act 1881	44 & 45 Vict. c. lxvi	27 June 1881
An Act to confirm certain Provisional Orders of the Local Government Board relating to the Boroughs of Halifax and Leeds, and the City of Manchester.
	Halifax Order 1881 Provisional Order for partially repealing, altering, and amending certain Local Acts. (Note: Halifax Gas Act 1855 (18 & 19 Vict. c. cxliv)) (Note: Halifax Park and Improvement Act 1858 (21 & 22 Vict. c. xci)) (Note: Halifax Extension and Improvement Act 1865 (28 & 29 Vict. c. cxl)) (Note: Halifax Water and Gas Extension Act 1876 (39 & 40 Vict. c. ccxxxiv))	
	Leeds Order 1881 Provisional Order for altering and amending certain Local Acts. (Note: Leeds Improvement Act 1842 (5 & 6 Vict. c. civ)) (Note: Leeds Improvement Act 1866 (29 & 30 Vict. c. clvii)) (Note: Leeds Improvement Act 1877 (40 & 41 Vict. c. clxxviii))	
	Manchester Order 1881 Provisional Order for altering certain Local Acts. (Note: Manchester Corporation Waterworks and Improvement Act 1867 (30 & 31 Vict. c. xxxvi)) (Note: Manchester Corporation Waterworks and Improvement Act 1869 (32 & 33 Vict. c. cxvii)) (Note: Manchester Improvement Act 1871 (34 & 35 Vict. c. lxv)) (Note: Manchester Corporation Waterworks and Improvement Act 1872 (35 & 36 Vict. c. xxxi)) (Note: Manchester Corporation Waterworks and Improvement Act 1875 (38 & 39 Vict. c. clxi))	
Local Government Board's (Gas) Provisional Order Confirmation Act 1881	44 & 45 Vict. c. lxvii	27 June 1881
An Act to confirm a Provisional Order of the Local Government Board under the provisions of the Gas and Water Works Facilities Act, 1870, (Note: Gas and Water Works Facilities Act 1870 (33 & 34 Vict. c. 70)) and the Public Health Act, 1875, relating to the Borough of Bridgnorth.
	Bridgnorth Gas Order 1881 Borough of Bridgnorth. Provisional Order under the Gas and Water Works Facilities Act, 1870.	
Local Government Board's Provisional Order Confirmation (Birmingham) Act 1881 (repealed)	44 & 45 Vict. c. lxviii	27 June 1881
An Act to confirm a Provisional Order of the Local Government Board relating to the Borough of Birmingham. (Repealed by West Midlands County Council Act 1980 (c. xi))
	Birmingham Corporation Stock Order 1881 Provisional Order for altering and amending a Confirming Act. (Note: Local Government Board's Provisional Orders Confirmation (Bethesda, &c.) Act 1880 (43 & 44 Vict. c. clxxviii))	
Local Government Board (Ireland) Provisional Orders Confirmation (Ballymena, &c.) Act 1881	44 & 45 Vict. c. lxix	27 June 1881
An Act to confirm certain Provisional Orders of the Local Government Board for Ireland relating to the towns of Ballymena, Belmullet, and Enniskerry.
	Ballymena Waterworks Provisional Order 1881 Ballymena Waterworks. Provisional Order.	
	Belmullet Waterworks Provisional Order 1881 Belmullet Waterworks. Provisional Order.	
	Enniskerry Waterworks Provisional Order 1881 Enniskerry Waterworks. Provisional Order.	
Local Government Board's Provisional Orders Confirmation (Cottingham, &c.) Act 1881	44 & 45 Vict. c. lxx	27 June 1881
An Act to confirm certain Provisional Orders of the Local Government Board relating to the Local Government District of Cottingham, the Lanchester Joint Hospital District, and the Improvement Act District of Middleton and Tonge.
	Cottingham Order 1881 Provisional Order for extending the Local Government District of Cottingham, and for other purposes.	
	Lanchester Joint Hospital Order 1881 Provisional Order for forming a United District under Sect. 279 of the Public Health Act, 1875.	
	Middleton and Tonge Order 1881 Provisional Order for altering and amending a Local Act (Note: Middleton and Tonge Improvement Act 1861 (24 & 25 Vict. c. c)) and certain Confirming Acts. (Note: Local Government Board's Provisional Orders Confirmation (Bournemouth, &c.) Act 1878 (41 & 42 Vict. c. clxii)) (Note: Local Government Board's Provisional Orders Confirmation (Castleton-by-Rochdale, &c.) Act 1879 (42 & 43 Vict. c. lxxxvi)) (Note: Local Government Board's Provisional Orders Confirmation (Abingdon, &c.) Act 1880 (43 & 44 Vict. c. xxxvi))	
Irvine Burgh Act 1881 (repealed)	44 & 45 Vict. c. lxxi	27 June 1881
An Act for extending the boundaries of the burgh of Irvine for municipal and police purposes; for empowering the Corporation to widen and improve streets, and to supply gas and water; and for other purposes. (Repealed by Irvine and District Water Board Order 1961 (SI 1961/872))
Leicester Improvement Act 1881	44 & 45 Vict. c. lxxii	27 June 1881
An Act to enable the mayor aldermen and burgesses of the borough of Leicester to construct additional Flood Works and for other purposes.
Aberdeen Corporation Act 1881 (repealed)	44 & 45 Vict. c. lxxiii	27 June 1881
An Act to confer further powers on the Lord Provost, Magistrates, and Town Council of the Royal Burgh and City of Aberdeen, for municipal, police, and other purposes. (Repealed by Aberdeen Corporation (Administration Finance &c.) Order Confirmation Act 1940 (3 & 4 Geo. 6. c. iii))
Cheltenham Corporation Water Act 1881	44 & 45 Vict. c. lxxiv	27 June 1881
An Act for extending the time for the compulsory purchase of lands and for the construction of the works authorised by the Cheltenham Corporation Water Act 1878 (Note: Cheltenham Corporation Water Act 1878 (41 & 42 Vict. c. cciii)) for extending the limits of water supply of the Corporation and for other purposes.
Dudley Gas Act 1881	44 & 45 Vict. c. lxxv	27 June 1881
An Act to enable the Town of Dudley Gaslight Company to raise a further Sum of Money.
Matlock Waterworks Act 1881 (repealed)	44 & 45 Vict. c. lxxvi	27 June 1881
An Act to enable the Matlock Waterworks Company to acquire additional land to raise further capital and for other purposes. (Repealed by Matlock Urban District Council Act 1898 (61 & 62 Vict. c. clx))
Ryton (Parish) Local Board (Water) Act 1881 (repealed)	44 & 45 Vict. c. lxxvii	27 June 1881
An Act to enable the Local Board for the district of Ryton (Parish), in the county of Durham, to acquire Waters and lands for the purposes of their Water undertaking. (Repealed by Newcastle and Gateshead Water (Consolidation etc.) Order 1982 (SI 1982/1718))
Cleator Moor Local Board Act 1881	44 & 45 Vict. c. lxxviii	27 June 1881
An Act to authorise the Cleator Moor Local Board to construct Waterworks for the supply of water to their district and to make further provision for the government of their district and for other purposes.
Glencairn Railway (Abandonment) Act 1881 (repealed)	44 & 45 Vict. c. lxxix	27 June 1881
An Act for the Abandonment of the Glencairn Railway and for authorising the repayment of the money deposited for securing its completion. (Repealed by Statute Law (Repeals) Act 2013 (c. 2))
Goole and District Gas and Water Act 1881	44 & 45 Vict. c. lxxx	27 June 1881
An Act to incorporate the Goole and District Gas and Water Company; to enable them to acquire the Gas Undertaking at Goole belonging to the Undertakers of the Navigation of the Rivers of Aire and Calder, in the county of York, to construct Waterworks; and for other purposes.
West Ham Local Board Extension of Powers Act 1881	44 & 45 Vict. c. lxxxi	27 June 1881
An Act for enabling the Local Board for the District of West Ham, in the county of Essex, to make certain alterations and to maintain certain Works in and upon the Embankment of the Northern Outfall Sewer vested in the Metropolitan Board of Works, and to enlarge and add to their Town Hall and Offices; and for granting additional powers to the said Local Board; and for other purposes.
Moffat Railway Act 1881	44 & 45 Vict. c. lxxxii	27 June 1881
An Act to authorise the construction and maintenance of a railway from near the Beattock Station of the Caledonian Railway to Moffat; and for other purposes.
Colne and Marsden Local Board Act 1881	44 & 45 Vict. c. lxxxiii	27 June 1881
An Act for empowering the Colne and Marsden Local Board to acquire the Colne Waterworks, to construct additional waterworks, to make street improvements, and to make better provision in relation to the disposal of the sewage, the holding of markets, and the good government of the district, and for other purposes.
Bingley Water and Improvement Act 1881 (repealed)	44 & 45 Vict. c. lxxxiv	27 June 1881
An Act for extending the powers of the Bingley Improvement Commissioners in relation to the supply of Water to their District, for empowering the Commissioners to make Street Improvements, and to make further provision for the Local Government of the District of the Commissioners; and for other purposes. (Repealed by West Yorkshire Act 1980 (c. xiv))
Burntisland Harbour Act 1881 (repealed)	44 & 45 Vict. c. lxxxv	27 June 1881
An Act for vesting in Commissioners the Harbour of Burntisland. in the County of Fife; for improving and maintaining the said Harbour; and for other purposes. (Repealed by Forth Ports Authority Order Confirmation Act 1969 (c. xxxiv))
Metropolitan District Railway Act 1881	44 & 45 Vict. c. lxxxvi	27 June 1881
An Act to enable the Metropolitan District Railway Company to make a junction at West Brompton and to confer other powers on the Company.
Charnwood Forest Railway Act 1881	44 & 45 Vict. c. lxxxvii	27 June 1881
An Act to confer further powers on the Charnwood Forest Railway Company, and to authorise a diversion of part of their authorised line; and for other purposes.
Dumbarton Harbour Act 1881	44 & 45 Vict. c. lxxxviii	27 June 1881
An Act to constitute a body of Harbour Trustees for the management, maintenance, and regulation of the Harbour of Dumbarton; and for other purposes.
City of London Commissioners of Sewers (Artizans Dwellings) Act 1881	44 & 45 Vict. c. lxxxix	27 June 1881
An Act for making better provision respecting the borrowing of money by the Commissioners of Sewers of the City of London for the purposes of the Artizans Dwellings Acts and for other purposes.
Witham Drainage Act 1881	44 & 45 Vict. c. xc	27 June 1881
An Act for further improving the drainage by the River Witham, in the County of Lincoln, and for amending the Acts relating thereto; and for other purposes.
London, Chatham and Dover Railway (Maidstone and Faversham Junction Railway) Act 1881	44 & 45 Vict. c. xci	27 June 1881
An Act to authorise the London Chatham and Dover Railway Company to construct a Railway in the County of Kent to be called the Maidstone and Faversham Junction Railway and for other purposes.
Maidstone and Ashford Railway Act 1881	44 & 45 Vict. c. xcii	27 June 1881
An Act to confer further powers on the London Chatham and Dover Railway Company in respect to the Maidstone and Ashford Railway.
London, Chatham and Dover Railway (City and Suburban Traffic Station) Act 1881	44 & 45 Vict. c. xciii	27 June 1881
An Act to confer further powers on the London Chatham and Dover Railway Company in respect to the Maidstone and Ashford Railway.
Hull Corporation Loans Act 1881	44 & 45 Vict. c. xciv	27 June 1881
An Act to make further Provision respecting the Borrowing of Money by the Corporation of Kingston-upon-Hull and for other purposes.
Lancashire County Justices Act 1881 (repealed)	44 & 45 Vict. c. xcv	27 June 1881
An Act for authorising the Justices of the Peace for the County Palatine of Lancaster to construct Bridges over the Rivers Lune and Croal, and to consolidate the County Debt; and for other purposes. (Repealed by County of Lancashire Act 1984 (c. xxi))
Watford and Rickmansworth Railway (Transfer and Dissolution) Act 1881	44 & 45 Vict. c. xcvi	27 June 1881
An Act to vest the undertaking of the Watford and Rickmansworth Railway Company in the London and North-western Railway Company; and for other purposes.
Midland Great Western Railway of Ireland Act 1881 (repealed)	44 & 45 Vict. c. xcvii	27 June 1881
An Act to confer further powers on the Midland Great Western Railway of Ireland Company; and for other purposes. (Repealed by Statute Law (Repeals) Act 2013 (c. 2))
Local Government Board's Provisional Orders Confirmation (Askern, &c.) Act 1881	44 & 45 Vict. c. xcviii	18 July 1881
An Act to confirm certain Provisional Orders of the Local Government Board relating to the Local Government Districts of Askern and Atherton, the Borough of Birmingham, the Local Government Districts of Ealing and Hampton Wick, the City of Liverpool, the Borough of Middlesbrough, and the Local Government Districts of Selby and Shirley.
	Askern Order 1881 Provisional Order for dissolving the Local Government District of Askern.	
	Atherton Order 1881 Provisional Order for altering and amending a Confirming Act. (Note: Atherton Local Board Act 1873 (36 & 37 Vict. c. xciv))	
	Birmingham Order 1881 (2) Provisional Order for altering certain Local Acts of Parliament. (Note: Birmingham Improvement Act 1851 (14 & 15 Vict. c. xciii)) (Note: Birmingham Improvement Act 1861 (24 & 25 Vict. c. ccvi))	
	Ealing Order 1881 Provisional Order to enable the Sanitary Authority for the Urban Sanitary District of Ealing to put in force the Compulsory Clauses of the Lands Clauses Consolidation Acts, 1845, 1860, and 1869.	
	Hampton Wick Order 1881 Provisional Order to enable the Urban Sanitary Authority for the District of Hampton Wick to put in force the Compulsory Clauscs of the Lands Clauses Consolidation Acts, 1845, 1860, and 1869.	
	Liverpool Order 1881 Provisional Order for partially repealing and altering certain Local Acts. (Note: Liverpool Improvement Act 1786 (26 Geo. 3. c. 12)) (Note: Liverpool Markets and Tolls Act 1819 (59 Geo. 3. c. ix)) (Note: Liverpool Improvement Act 1842 (5 & 6 Vict. c. cvi))	
	Middlesbrough Order 1881 Provisional Order for altering a Local Act. (Note: Middlesbrough Improvement Act 1841 (4 & 5 Vict. c. lxviii))	
	Selby Order 1881 Provisional Order for extending the Local Government District of Selby, and for other purposes.	
	Shirley Order 1881 Provisional Order for extending the Local Government District of Shirley, and for other purposes.	
Local Government Board's Provisional Orders Confirmation (Horfield, &c.) Act 1881	44 & 45 Vict. c. xcix	18 July 1881
An Act to confirm certain Provisional Orders of the Local Government Board relating to the Local Government Districts of Horfield and Teignmouth.
	Horfield Order 1881 Provisional Order for extending the Local Government District of Horfield.	
	Teignmouth Order 1881 Provisional Order for extending the Local Government District of Teignmouth and for other purposes.	
Inclosure (Thurstaston Common) Provisional Order Confirmation Act 1881	44 & 45 Vict. c. c	18 July 1881
An Act to confirm the Provisional Order for the inclosure of certain lands called or known as Thurstaston Common, situate in the parish of Thurstaston, in the county of Chester, in pursuance of a report of the Inclosure Commissioners for England and Wales.
	Thurstaston Common Order 1881 Provisional Order for the Inclosure of a Common.	
Land Drainage Supplemental Act 1881	44 & 45 Vict. c. ci	18 July 1881
An Act to confirm certain Provisional Orders under the Land Drainage Act, 1861. (Note: Land Drainage Act 1861 (24 & 25 Vict. c. 133))
	Swavesey and Fen Drayton Order 1881 In the matter of Swavesey and Fen Drayton Improvements, situate in the parishes of Swavesey and Fen Drayton in the county of Cambridge.	
	Feltwell and Methwold Order 1881 In the matter of Feltwell and Methwold Improvements situate in the parishes of Feltwell and Methwold in the county of Norfolk.	
Local Government Board's Provisional Orders Confirmation (Birmingham, Tame and Rea, &c.). Act 1881	44 & 45 Vict. c. cii	18 July 1881
An Act to confirm certain Provisional Orders of the Local Government Board relating to the Birmingham, Tame, and Rea Main Sewerage District, the Local Government Districts of Cowpen and Leigh, the Borough of Nottingham, and the Local Government District of Risca.
	Birmingham, Tame and Rea Order 1881 Provisional Order for altering a Confirming Act. (Note: Local Government Board's Provisional Orders Confirmation (Joint Boards) Act 1877 (40 & 41 Vict. c. ccxxix))	
	Cowpen Order 1881 Provisional Order for extending the Local Government District of Cowpen, and for other purposes.	
	Leigh Order 1881 Provisional Order for partially repealing and amending a Local Act. (Note: Westleigh, Pennington and Bedford Local Boards (Gas) Act 1874 (37 & 38 Vict. c. lxxi))	
	Nottingham Order 1881 Provisional Order to enable the Urban Sanitary Authority for the Borough of Nottingham to put in force the Compulsory Clauses of the Lands Clauses Consolidation Acts, 1845, 1860, and 1869.	
	Risca Order 1881 Provisional Order for extending the Local Government District of Risca.	
Gas Orders Confirmation Act 1881	44 & 45 Vict. c. ciii	18 July 1881
An Act to confirm certain Provisional Orders made by the Board of Trade under the Gas and Water Works Facilities Act, 1870, relating to Brentford Gas, Chichester Gas, Ely Gas, Grays Thurrock Gas, Ilford Gas, Kirkham Gas, Northfleet and Greenhithe Gas, Pinner Gas, Staines and Egham Gas, Stone Gas, and Waltham Abbey and Cheshunt Gas; and to amend the Gas and Water Works Facilities Act, 1870, in so far as relates to the district of the Brentford Gas Company.
	Brentford Gas Order 1881 Order empowering the Brentford Gas Company to raise Additional Capital, to purchase Additional Lands, and to construct Additional Gasworks.	
	Chichester Gas Order 1881 Order empowering the City of Chichester Gas Company to raise additional Capital.	
	Ely Gas Order 1881 Order empowering the City of Ely Gas Company (Limited) to maintain and continue Gasworks, and to make and supply Gas in the parishes of Holy Trinity, hamlet of Stuntney St. Mary, hamlet of Chettisham, and parish of the College, Ely.	
	Grays Thurrock Gas Order 1881 Order empowering the Grays Thurrock Gas and Coke Company to maintain and continue Gasworks, to construct new Gasworks, and to make and supply Gas in the parishes of Grays Thurrock, West Thurrock, Little Thurrock, and Stifford, all in the county of Essex.	
	Ilford Gas Order 1881 Order empowering the Ilford Gas Light and Coke Company to raise additional Capital.	
	Kirkham Gas Order 1881 Order empowering the Kirkham Gas Company (Limited) to maintain and continue Gasworks, to construct additional Gasworks, and to make and supply Gas in the townships of Kirkham, Medlar-with-Wesham, Westby-with-Plumpton, Ribby-with-Wrea, Freckleton and Treales, Roseacre and Wharles, in the parish of Kirkham, all in the county of Lancaster.	
	Northfleet and Greenhithe Gas Order 1881 Order authorising the amalgamation of the Gas Undertakings respectively authorised by the Northfleet Gas Order, 1879, and the Greenhithe Gas Order, 1878, and authorising the Northfleet and Greenhithe Gas Company, Limited, to maintain and continue Gasworks, and to make and supply Gas in part of the parish of Northfleet and the entire parish of Swanscombe, in the county of Kent.	
	Pinner Gas Order 1881 Order conferring powers for the maintenance and continuance of Gasworks, and for the manufacture and supply of Gas, in part of the parish of Pinner, and in the several parishes or places of Ruislip, Harefield, and Ickenham, all in the county of Middlesex.	
	Staines and Egham Gas Order 1881 Order empowering the Staines and Egham District Gas and Coke Company, Limited, to construct and maintain additional Gas Works, and to raise additional Capital for such purposes.	
	Stone Gas Order 1881 Order empowering the Stone Gaslight and Coke Company (Limited) to maintain and continue Gasworks, and to make and supply Gas in the township of Stone and the adjoining townships or places of Darlaston, Meaford, Oulton, Walton, Aston, Stoke by Stone, and Little Aston, all in the parish of Stone and county of Stafford.	
	Waltham Abbey and Cheshunt Gas Order 1881 Order empowering the Waltham Abbey and Cheshunt Gas and Coke Company to raise additional capital and to maintain gasworks.	
Pier and Harbour Orders Confirmation Act 1881	44 & 45 Vict. c. civ	18 July 1881
An Act to confirm certain Provisional Orders made by the Board of Trade under the General Pier and Harbour Act, 1861, (Note: General Pier and Harbour Act 1861 (24 & 25 Vict. c. 45)) relating to Burghead, Cart, Crarae, Devonport, Folkestone, Folkestone (Central), Girvan, Leven, Lochaline, Penarth, Peterhead, Pittenweem, Ramsgate, Sandhaven, Shanklin, Stornoway, Weston-super-Mare, and Whitby.
	Burghead Harbour Order 1881 Order for the Improvement and Maintenance of the Harbour of Burghead, in the county of Elgin.	
	Cart Navigation Order 1881 Order for amending the Acts with respect to the Harbour of Paisley and the Cart Navigation; and for making further provision with respect to the Harbour and Navigation.	
	Crarae Pier Order 1881 Order for the Maintenance and Regulation of Crarae Pier, in the parish of Kilmichael Glassary and county of Argyll.	
	Devonport Landing Stages Order 1881 Order for the Construction and Maintenance of Landing Stages and other Works in the Borough of Devonport, in the County of Devon.	
	Folkestone Pier and Lift Order 1881 Order for the construction, maintenance, and regulation of a Pier and Lift at Folkestone, in the county of Kent.	
	Folkestone (Central) Pier Order 1881 Provisional Order for the Construction, Maintenance, and Regulation of a Pier at Folkestone, in the County of Kent.	
	Girvan Harbour Order 1881 Order for the further Improvement and Regulation of the Harbour of Girvan, in the County of Ayr.	
	Leven Harbour Order 1881 Order for the revival of certain of the Powers conferred by and for the amendment of the Leven Harbour Act, 1876. (Note: Leven Harbour Act 1876 (39 & 40 Vict. c. clxxiii))	
	Lochaline Pier Order 1881 Order for the construction, maintenance, and regulation of a Pier at Lochaline in the county of Argyll.	
	Penarth Promenade and Landing Pier Order 1881 Order for the construction, maintenance, and regulation of a Pier at Penarth, in the County of Glamorgan.	
	Peterhead Harbours Order 1881 Order for amending the Peterhead Harbours Acts, 1873 (Note: Peterhead Harbours Act 1873 (36 & 37 Vict. c. clvii)) and 1876. (Note: Peterhead Harbours Amendment Act 1876 (39 & 40 Vict. c. clxxiv))	
	Pittenween Harbour Order 1881 Order varying the rates levied in the harbour of Pittenweem, and making further provision with respect to the Harbour.	
	Ramsgate (West Cliff) Pier Order 1881 Order for the construction, maintenance, and regulation of a Pier and Works in the parish of Ramsgate, in the county of Kent.	
	Sandhaven Harbour Order 1881 Order for amending the Sandhaven Harbour Order, 1873.	
	Shanklin Pier Order 1881 Order for the Construction, Maintenance, and Regulation of a Pier at Shanklin, in the Isle of Wight.	
	Stornoway Harbour Order 1881 Order for amending the Stornoway Harbour Order, 1865.	
	Weston-super-Mare Pier Order 1881 Order for amending the Weston-super-Mare Pier Acts, 1862 (Note: Weston-super-Mare Pier Act 1862 (25 & 26 Vict. c. clxix)) and 1864, (Note: Weston-super-Mare Pier (Extension) Act 1864 (27 & 28 Vict. c. clv)) and conferring further powers on the Weston-super-Mare Pier Company.	
	Whitby Port and Harbour Order 1881 Order for varying the rates levied in the harbour of Whitby, in the county of York.	
Tramways Orders Confirmation (No. 1) Act 1881	44 & 45 Vict. c. cv	18 July 1881
An Act to confirm certain Provisional Orders made by the Board of Trade under the Tramways Act, 1870, (Note: Tramways Act 1870 (33 & 34 Vict. c. 78)) relating to Bootle-cum-Linacre Corporation Tramways, Gravesend, Rosherville, and Northfleet Tramways, Jarrow and Hebburn and District Tramways, Liverpool Corporation Tramways (Extension), Manchester Corporation Tramways, Middlesbrough Tramways (Extensions), North Staffordshire Tramways (Extensions), Rusholme Local Board Tramways, Shipley Tramways, South Gosforth Tramways, South Shields Corporation Tramways, Woolwich and South-east London Tramways, and York Tramways (Extensions).
	Bootle-cum-Linacre Corporation Tramways Order 1881 Order authorising the Mayor, Aldermen, and Burgesses of the borough of Bootle-cum-Linacre to construct Tramways in the said borough.	
	Gravesend, Rosherville and Northfleet Tramways Order 1881 Order authorising the construction of Tramways from Gravesend to Northfleet, in the county of Kent.	
	Jarrow and Hebburn and District Tramways Order 1881 Order authorising the construction of tramways in the borough of Jarrow and district of Hebburn, in the county of Durham.	
	Liverpool Corporation Tramways (Extension) Order 1881 Order authorising the Mayor, Aldermen, and Citizens of the city of Liverpool to construct certain Tramways in the said city.	
	Manchester Corporation Tramways Order 1881 Order authorising the Mayor, Aldermen, and Citizens of the city of Manchester, in the county of Lancaster, to construct certain Tramways in the said city.	
	Middlesbrough Tramways (Extensions) Order 1881 Order authorising the construction of Tramways in the borough of Middlesbrough and parish of Ormesby, in the North Riding of the county of York.	
	North Staffordshire Tramways Extensions Order 1881 Order authorising the construction of Tramways in the district of the rural sanitary authority of Stone, the borough of Hanley, the borough of Burslem, the borough of Stoke-upon-Trent, the borough of Newcastle-under-Lyme, the district of the rural sanitary authority of Wolstanton, and the district of the rural sanitary authority of Cheadle, in the parish of Trentham, the township of Blurton, in the parish of Trentham, the township of Normacot, in the parish of Stone, the parish of Stoke-upon-Trent, the parish of Newcastle-under-Lyme, the parish of Wolstanton, the parish of Burslem, in the township of Knutton, in the parish of Wolstanton, and the township of Weston Coyney, in the parish of Caverswall, all in the county of Stafford.	
	Rusholme Local Board of Health Tramways Order 1881 Order authorising the Local Board of Health for the district of Rusholme, in the county of Lancaster, to construct certain Tramways in the district of the said Local Board.	
	Shipley Tramways Order 1881 Order authorising the construction of Tramways in the Local Government district or township of Shipley, in the parish of Bradford, in the West Riding of the county of York.	
	South Gosforth Tramways Order 1881 Order authorising the construction of Tramways in the district of South Gosforth, in the township of Coxlodge, in the parish of Gosforth, in the county of Northumberland.	
	South Shields Corporation Tramways Order 1881 Order authorising the Mayor, Aldermen, and Burgesses of the borough of South Shields to construct Tramways in the said borough.	
	Woolwich and South East London Tramways Order 1881 Order authorising the Woolwich and South-east London Tramways Company, Limited, to construct Street Tramways from Woolwich to Greenwich, in the county of Kent; and amending the Woolwich and Plumstead Tramways Order, 1880.	
	York Tramways (Extensions) Order 1881 Order authorising the York Tramways Company, Limited, to construct additional Tramways in the city and county of the city of York, and in the East Riding of the county of York, and amending the York Tramways Order, 1879.	
Limerick and Kerry Railway Act 1881	44 & 45 Vict. c. cvi	18 July 1881
An Act to confer further powers on the Limerick and Kerry Railway Company, and other Companies.
Swansea Corporation Loans Act 1881	44 & 45 Vict. c. cvii	18 July 1881
An Act for making further Provision respecting the Borrowing of Money by the Corporation of Swansea; and for other purposes.
East London Railway Act 1881	44 & 45 Vict. c. cviii	18 July 1881
An Act to make provision for the payment of the debts of the East London Railway Company.
Ipswich Tramways Act 1881	44 & 45 Vict. c. cix	18 July 1881
An Act to incorporate the Ipswich Tramways Company, and to authorise the acquisition by them of Tramways in the borough of Ipswich, and to empower them to construct new Tramways; and for other purposes.
London Sea Water Supply Act 1881	44 & 45 Vict. c. cx	18 July 1881
An Act for authorising the construction of Works for supplying Sea Water to certain parts of London and other places; and for other purposes.
Beverley Waterworks Act 1881 (repealed)	44 & 45 Vict. c. cxi	18 July 1881
An Act for better supplying with Water the borough of Beverley, in the East Riding of the county of York. (Repealed by Beverley Water Order 1949 (SI 1949/551))
Boston Dock Act 1881	44 & 45 Vict. c. cxii	18 July 1881
An Act to authorise the Construction of a new Dock and other Works at Boston, in the county of Lincoln, and for conferring further Powers on the Mayor, Aldermen, and Burgesses of the borough of Boston in relation to the port and harbour of Boston.
North British and Montrose Railway Companies Amalgamation Act 1881	44 & 45 Vict. c. cxiii	18 July 1881
An Act to amalgamate the Montrose and Bervie Railway Company with the North British Railway Company; and for other purposes.
Warehouse Owners Company (Delivery Warrants) Act 1881	44 & 45 Vict. c. cxiv	18 July 1881
An Act to enable the Warehouse Owners Company Limited to issue transferable certificates and warrants for the delivery of goods and for other purposes.
Seacombe, Hoylake and Dee Side Railway Act 1881	44 & 45 Vict. c. cxv	18 July 1881
An Act to authorise the Hoylake and Birkenhead Rail and Tramway Company to extend their Railway to Seacombe; to change the name of the Company; and for other purposes.
Woking Water and Gas Act 1881	44 & 45 Vict. c. cxvi	18 July 1881
An Act for incorporating the Woking Water and Gas Company; and for other purposes.
Aylesbury and Rickmansworth Railway Act 1881	44 & 45 Vict. c. cxvii	18 July 1881
An Act for making a Railway from the Aylesbury and Buckingham Railway at Aylesbury to the Rickmansworth Extension Railway at Rickmansworth; and for other purposes.
Brighton and Dyke Railway Act 1881	44 & 45 Vict. c. cxviii	18 July 1881
An Act to revive the powers and extend the periods for the compulsory purchase of lands and for the construction of the Brighton and Dyke Railway.
Caledonian Railway (Additional Powers) Act 1881	44 & 45 Vict. c. cxix	18 July 1881
An Act for confirming an Agreement for the maintenance, working, and management of the Undertaking of the Cathcart District Railway Company by the Caledonian Railway Company; for enabling the Caledonian Railway Company to contribute to and hold shares in that Undertaking, to acquire the remaining shares in the Busby Railway Company, and to provide a Hotel at their Central Station in Glasgow; for dissolving the Busby Railway Company and vesting their Undertaking in the Caledonian Railway Company; and for other purposes.
Standard Bank of British South Africa (Limited) Act 1881	44 & 45 Vict. c. cxx	18 July 1881
An Act to extend the powers of the Standard Bank of British South Africa (Limited), and for other purposes relating thereto.
Barrow-in-Furness Corporation Act 1881	44 & 45 Vict. c. cxxi	18 July 1881
An Act to extend the boundary of the borough of Barrow-in-Furness, to empower the Mayor, Aldermen, and Burgesses of the borough to make Tramways and new Streets, to confer further Borrowing Powers, to make better provision for the good government of the borough; and for other purposes.
Bradford Water and Improvement Act 1881	44 & 45 Vict. c. cxxii	18 July 1881
An Act to enable the Mayor, Aldermen, and Burgesses of the borough of Bradford, in the West Riding of the county of York, to construct and maintain additional Works for the storage and supply of Water, to enlarge the Time for making Waterworks already authorised, to effect Public Improvements, to enlarge the Borough for municipal, sanitary, and school board purposes; and for other purposes.
Egremont Local Board Waterworks Act 1881 (repealed)	44 & 45 Vict. c. cxxiii	18 July 1881
An Act to authorise the Local Board for the District of Egremont, in the county of Cumberland, to construct Waterworks and to supply Water; and for other purposes. (Repealed by Egremont Urban District Water Act 1912 (2 & 3 Geo. 5. c. xvi))
Stirling Waterworks Amendment Act 1881	44 & 45 Vict. c. cxxiv	18 July 1881
An Act to authorise the Stirling Waterworks Commissioners to make and maintain an additional Reservoir and other Works, and to extend the supply of Water; and for other purposes.
Cork, Blackrock and Passage Railway (Steam Vessels) Act 1881	44 & 45 Vict. c. cxxv	18 July 1881
An Act for empowering the Cork, Blackrock, and Passage Railway Company to provide and use Steam and other Vessels; and for other purposes.
Great Southern and Western Railway Act 1881	44 & 45 Vict. c. cxxvi	18 July 1881
An Act for enabling the Great Southern and Western Railway Company to extend their Railway to Baltinglass, and to form a junction with the Limerick and Kerry Railway at Tralee; to acquire additional Lands; and for other purposes.
Greene's Patent Act 1881	44 & 45 Vict. c. cxxvii	18 July 1881
An Act for rendering valid certain Letters Patent granted to John Greene for the invention of improvements in the manufacture of Types Logotypes and Phrasotypes and in Apparatus therefor.
Parts of Holland and Sutton Bridge Water Act 1881	44 & 45 Vict. c. cxxviii	18 July 1881
An Act for incorporating and conferring powers on the parts of Holland and Sutton Bridge Water Company.
London, Chatham and Dover Railway (Further Powers) Act 1881	44 & 45 Vict. c. cxxix	18 July 1881
An Act for conferring further powers on the London, Chatham, and Dover Railway Company; and for other purposes.
Exeter Tramways Act 1881 (repealed)	44 & 45 Vict. c. cxxx	18 July 1881
An Act for making Tramways in the county of Devon, to be called "The Exeter Tramways"; and for other purposes. (Repealed by Exeter City Council Act 1987 (c. xi))
Cheshire Lines Act 1881	44 & 45 Vict. c. cxxxi	18 July 1881
An Act for conferring further powers upon the Cheshire Lines Committee, and upon the three Companies represented upon that committee.
Elham Valley Light Railway Act 1881	44 & 45 Vict. c. cxxxii	18 July 1881
An Act for making a railway from Canterbury through the Elham Valley to join the South-eastern Railway in the parish of Cheriton, in the county of Kent; and for other purposes.
City of Glasgow Union Railway Act 1881	44 & 45 Vict. c. cxxxiii	18 July 1881
An Act to enable the City of Glasgow Union Railway Company to construct a short new railway; to abandon certain authorised railways; to convert, consolidate, and re-arrange some of their stocks and shares; and for other purposes.
Great Eastern Railway Act 1881	44 & 45 Vict. c. cxxxiv	18 July 1881
An Act to authorise the Great Eastern Railway Company to widen several of their railways, to make new railways, tramways, and works, and to exercise various powers in relation to their own undertaking and capital, and the undertakings of other companies, and for amending their Acts; and for other purposes.
Lancashire and Yorkshire Railway Act 1881	44 & 45 Vict. c. cxxxv	18 July 1881
An Act for conferring further powers on the Lancashire and Yorkshire Railway Company with relation to their own undertaking and undertakings in which they are jointly interested; and for other purposes.
Manchester, Sheffield and Lincolnshire Railway (New Works) Act 1881	44 & 45 Vict. c. cxxxvi	18 July 1881
An Act to authorise the Manchester, Sheffield, and Lincolnshire Railway Company to construct a new railway and other works, and to confer further powers upon that Company, and upon the Wigan Junction Railways Company, in connexion with their undertakings; and for other purposes.
North British Railway (New Tay Viaduct) Act 1881	44 & 45 Vict. c. cxxxvii	18 July 1881
An Act to provide for the restoration of the Railway communication across the Tay, near Dundee; and for other purposes.
King's Lynn Dock Act 1881	44 & 45 Vict. c. cxxxviii	18 July 1881
An Act to amend the Acts relating to the King's Lynn Dock Company, and to confer further Powers upon that Company.
Caledonian Railway (Lanarkshire Lines) Act 1881	44 & 45 Vict. c. cxxxix	18 July 1881
An Act for enabling the Caledonian Railway Company to make railways to Airdrie and other places in the county of Lanark; and for other purposes.
Dublin United Tramways Company Act 1881	44 & 45 Vict. c. cxl	18 July 1881
An Act to dissolve and re-incorporate the Dublin United Tramways Company (Limited), and to amalgamate therewith the Dublin Tramways Company, the North Dublin Street Tramways Company, and the Dublin Central Tramways Company; and for other purposes.
London and North Western Railway (New Railways) Act 1881	44 & 45 Vict. c. cxli	18 July 1881
An Act for empowering the London and North-western Railway Company to make new railways, and widen, alter, and improve portions of their existing railways, and for conferring further powers upon that Company, and the Lancashire and Yorkshire Railway Company, and upon the Lancashire Union Railways Company, in respect of other undertakings in which they are jointly interested; and for other purposes.
Thames Deep Water Dock Act 1881	44 & 45 Vict. c. cxlii	18 July 1881
An Act to authorise the construction and maintenance of a Dock, and other Works in connexion therewith, in the parish of Dagenham, in the county of Essex.
Bray (County Wicklow) Township Act 1881	44 & 45 Vict. c. cxliii	18 July 1881
An Act to enable the Commissioners of the Bray Township to construct a Sea Wall along the Esplanade, and other works; and for other purposes.
Gravesend Railway Act 1881	44 & 45 Vict. c. cxliv	18 July 1881
An Act for making a railway from the London, Chatham, and Dover Railway to the borough of Gravesend, and widening and extending Church Street in Gravesend; and for other purposes.
Rotherham, Parkgate and Rawmarsh Tramways Act 1881 (repealed)	44 & 45 Vict. c. cxlv	18 July 1881
An Act to authorise the construction of Street Tramways between Rotherham and Rawmarsh, in the West Riding of the county of York; and for other purposes. (Repealed by Statute Law (Repeals) Act 1989 (c. 43))
Swindon and Cheltenham Extension Railway Act 1881	44 & 45 Vict. c. cxlvi	18 July 1881
An Act for making a railway between Swindon and Cheltenham; and for other purposes.
Stockton Bridge Act 1881 (repealed)	44 & 45 Vict. c. cxlvii	18 July 1881
An Act to provide for the building of a new Bridge over the River Tees and of approach Roads thereto by the Corporation of Stockton and the Local Board for the District of South Stockton, and for removing the existing Stockton Bridge; to enable the justices of the county of Durham and of the North Riding of the county of York and the Tees Conservancy Commissioners to make contributions towards the expenses thereof; and for other purposes. (Repealed by Teesside Corporation (General Powers) Act 1971 (c. xv))
Metropolitan Board of Works (Hackney Commons) Act 1881	44 & 45 Vict. c. cxlviii	18 July 1881
An Act to enable the Metropolitan Board of Works to acquire certain rights and interests in and affecting Hackney Commons.
Glasgow and South-Western Railway Act 1881	44 & 45 Vict. c. cxlix	18 July 1881
An Act for conferring further powers on the Glasgow and South-western Railway Company for the construction of Works, the acquisition of Lands, and the raising of Money; for authorising the discontinuance of the Paisley Canal; and for other purposes.
Leeds Tramways Act 1881 (repealed)	44 & 45 Vict. c. cl	18 July 1881
An Act to confer further powers on the Leeds Tramways Company. (Repealed by Leeds Corporation (Consolidation) Act 1905 (5 Edw. 7. c. i))
Midland Railway (Additional Powers) Act 1881	44 & 45 Vict. c. cli	18 July 1881
An Act for conferring new and revived and extended powers upon the Midland Railway Company for the construction of Railways and other Works, and the acquisition of Lands; for vesting in the Company the Undertaking of the Keighley and Worth Valley Railway Company; for amending the Acts relating to the Company and to the Lessees of the North and South Western Junction Railway; for raising further Capital; and for other purposes.
Birkenhead Corporation (Gas and Water) Act 1881	44 & 45 Vict. c. clii	18 July 1881
An Act to authorise the Corporation of Birkenhead to construct additional Waterworks and extend their Gasworks, and for other purposes in relation to their Water and Gas Undertakings.
Birkenhead Corporation Act 1881	44 & 45 Vict. c. cliii	18 July 1881
An Act to consolidate and amend the Acts relating to the borough of Birkenhead; to make a Bridge; and for other purposes.
Caledonian Railway (Larbert and Grangemouth Connecting Lines) Act 1881	44 & 45 Vict. c. cliv	18 July 1881
An Act for enabling the Caledonian Railway Company to make Railways for connecting their Scottish Central Line at Larbert with their Grangemouth Branch, and with the Railway to Carron Ironworks; and for other purposes.
Edmonton Local Board (Division of District) Act 1881	44 & 45 Vict. c. clv	18 July 1881
An Act to divide the District of the Local Board of Health of Edmonton, in the county of Middlesex; and for other purposes.
Great Northern Railway Act 1881	44 & 45 Vict. c. clvi	18 July 1881
An Act to confer further powers upon the Great Northern Railway Company to enable them to acquire the Stafford and Uttoxeter Railway; and for other purposes.
London and North Western Railway (Additional Powers) Act 1881	44 & 45 Vict. c. clvii	18 July 1881
An Act for conferring further powers upon the London and North-western Railway Company in relation to their own Undertaking and other Undertakings in which they are interested jointly with other Companies, and also for conferring powers upon the Lancashire Union Railways Company, the Great Western Railway Company, the Midland Railway Company, and the Oldham, Ashton-under-Lyne, and Guide Bridge Junction Railway Company in relation to such other Undertakings; and for other purposes.
Potteries, Shrewsbury and North Wales Railway Winding-up Act 1881	44 & 45 Vict. c. clviii	18 July 1881
An Act for authorising the Sale of the Undertaking of the Potteries, Shrewsbury, and North Wales Railway Company.
Swanage Railway Act 1881	44 & 45 Vict. c. clix	18 July 1881
An Act to incorporate a Company for the construction of the Swanage Railway and for other purposes.
East London Waterworks Company Act 1881	44 & 45 Vict. c. clx	18 July 1881
An Act to confirm the creation and issue of a certain Debenture Stock by the East London Waterworks Company.
Commons Regulation (Shenfield) Provisional Order Confirmation Act 1881	44 & 45 Vict. c. clxi	11 August 1881
An Act to confirm the Provisional Order for the Regulation of certain lands known as Shenfield Common, situate in the parish of Shenfield, in the county of Essex, in pursuance of a Report of the Inclosure Commissioners for England and Wales.
	Shenfield Common Order 1881 Provisional Order for the Regulation of a Common.	
Local Government Board's Provisional Orders Confirmation (Acton, &c.) Act 1881	44 & 45 Vict. c. clxii	11 August 1881
An Act to confirm certain Provisional Orders of the Local Government Board relating to the Local Government Districts of Acton, Buxton, and Crompton, the Port of Harwich, the Improvement Act District of Llandudno, the Borough of Monmouth, the Local Government District of Normanton, the Borough of Pontefract, the Local Government District of Wallasey, the Borough of Walsall, the Improvement Act District of Wath-upon-Dearne, and the Local Board of Health District of Woolwich.
	Acton Order 1881 Provisional Order to enable the Sanitary Authority for the Urban Sanitary District of Acton to put in force the Compulsory Clauses of the Lands Clauses Consolidation Acts, 1845, 1860, and 1869.	
	Buxton Order 1881 Provisional Order for altering and amending a Local Act. (Note: Buxton Local Board Act 1873 (36 & 37 Vict. c. lvi))	
	Crompton Order 1881 Provisional Order to enable the Sanitary Authority for the Urban Sanitary District of Crompton to put in force the Compulsory Clauses of the Lands Clauses Consolidation Acts, 1845, 1860, and 1869.	
	Harwich Order 1881 Provisional Order for permanently constituting a Port Sanitary Authority, and for other purposes.	
	Llandudno Order 1881 Provisional Order for partially repealing and altering certain Local Acts. (Note: Llandudno Improvement Act 1854 (17 & 18 Vict. c. cii)) (Note: Llandudno Improvement Act 1876 (39 & 40 Vict. c. ccxli)) (Note: Llandudno Improvement Act 1879 (42 & 43 Vict. c. xviii))	
	Monmouth Order 1881 Provisional Order for partially repealing and altering a Local Act. (Note: Monmouth Improvement Act 1818 (58 Geo. 3. c. lxxxi))	
	Normanton Order 1881 Provisional Order to enable the Sanitary Authority for the Urban Sanitary District of Normanton to put in force the Compulsory Clauses of the Lands Clauses Consolidation Acts, 1845, 1860, and 1869.	
	Pontefract Order 1881 Provisional Order for altering the mode of defraying the Expenses of an Urban Sanitary Authority.	
	Wallasey Order 1881 Provisional Order for altering and amending certain Local Acts (Note: Wallasey Improvement Act 1858 (21 & 22 Vict. c. lxiii)) (Note: Wallasey Improvement Act 1861 (24 & 25 Vict. c. iv)) (Note: Wallasey Improvement Act 1864 (27 & 28 Vict. c. cxvii)) (Note: Wallasey Improvement Act 1872 (35 & 36 Vict. c. cxxv)) and a Confirming Act. (Note: Local Government Board's Provisional Orders Confirmation (Caistor Union, &c.) Act 1877 (40 & 41 Vict. c. ccxxvii))	
	Walsall Order 1881 Provisional Order to enable the Urban Sanitary Authority for the Borough of Walsall to put in force the Compulsory Clauses of the Lands Clauses Consolidation Acts, 1845, 1860, and 1869.	
	Wath-upon-Dearne Order 1881 Provisional Order for repealing a Local Act, (Note: Wath-upon-Dearne Improvement Act 1846 (9 & 10 Vict. c. ccxcv)) and for constituting a Local Government District.	
	Woolwich Order 1881 Provisional Order to enable the Local Board of Health of the Woolwich District to put in force the Compulsory Clauses of the Lands Clauses Consolidation Acts, 1845, 1860, and 1869.	
Tramways Orders Confirmation (No. 2) Act 1881	44 & 45 Vict. c. clxiii	11 August 1881
An Act to confirm certain Provisional Orders made by the Board of Trade under the Tramways Act, 1870, relating to Birmingham and Western Districts Tramways, Dudley and Tipton Tramways, Dudley, Stourbridge, and Kingswinford Tramways, South Staffordshire Tramways, and Wednesbury and West Bromwich Tramways.
	Birmingham and Western Districts Tramways Order 1881 Order authorising the construction of Tramways in the parishes or places of Birmingham, Smethwick, Oldbury, West Bromwich, Rowley Regis, Tipton, and Dudley, in the counties of Warwick, Worcester, and Stafford.	
	Dudley and Tipton Tramways Order 1881 Order authorising the construction of Tramways in the borough of Dudley, in the county of Worcester, and in the parish of Tipton, in the county of Stafford.	
	Dudley, Stourbridge and Kingswinford Tramways Order 1881 Order authorising the construction of Tramways in the counties of Worcester and Stafford between Dudley, Stourbridge, and Kingswinford.	
	South Staffordshire Tramways Order 1881 Order authorising the construction of Tramways from Wednesbury to Dudley, viá Tipton.	
	Wednesbury and West Bromwich Tramways Order 1881 Order authorising the construction of Tramways in Wednesbury, West Bromwich, and Handsworth, all in the county of Stafford.	
Tramways Orders Confirmation (No. 3) Act 1881	44 & 45 Vict. c. clxiv	11 August 1881
An Act to confirm certain Provisional Orders made by the Board of Trade under the Tramways Act, 1870, relating to Bristol Tramways (Extensions), Bury and District Tramways, City of London and Metropolitan Tramways, Lincoln Tramways, Lincolnshire Tramways, Rochdale Tramways, Shepherd's Bush and Hammersmith Tramways, and Worcester Tramways.
	Bristol Tramways (Extensions) Order 1881 Order authorising the Bristol Tramways Company (Limited) to construct additional Tramways in the county of Gloucester, in the neighbourhood of the city of Bristol, and amending the Bristol and Eastern District Tramways Order, 1875, the Bristol Tramways (Extensions) Order, 1879, and the Bristol Tramways (Extensions) Order, 1880.	
	Bury and District Tramways Order 1881 Order authorising the construction of Tramways in the boroughs of Bury and Salford, the Local Board Districts of Whitefield and Prestwich, the township of Tottington-Lower-End, in the parish of Bury, and the hamlet of Unsworth, in the parish of Prestwich-cum-Oldham, all in the county of Lancaster.	
	City of London and Metropolitan Tramways Order 1881 Order authorising the construction of Tramways in the parishes of Saint Mary, Lambeth, and Saint George the Martyr, Southwark, in the county of Surrey.	
	Lincoln Tramways Order 1881 Order authorising the construction of Tramways from Lincoln to Bracebridge, in the division of Kesteven, in the county of Lincoln.	
	Lincolnshire Tramways Order 1881 Order authorising the construction of Tramways in the city of Lincoln, and between that city and the town of Brigg, in the county of Lincoln.	
	Rochdale Tramways Order 1881 Order authorising the construction of Tramways in the borough of Rochdale, and the district of the Wuerdle and Wardle Local Board, in the parish of Rochdale, and in the county of Lancaster.	
	Shepherd's Bush and Hammersmith Tramways Order 1881 Order authorising the construction of Tramways in the Goldhawk Road, between Shepherd's Bush and Hammersmith, in the county of Middlesex.	
	Worcester Tramways Order 1881 Order authorising the construction of Tramways in and near the city of Worcester.	
Water Orders Confirmation Act 1881	44 & 45 Vict. c. clxv	11 August 1881
An Act to confirm certain Provisional Orders made by the Board of Trade under the Gas and Water Works Facilities Act, 1870, relating to Dyserth, Meliden, and Prestatyn Water, Harwich Water, Henley-on-Thames Water, Newport and Pillgwenlly Water, Newhaven and Seaford Water, and Poole Water.
	Dyserth, Meliden and Prestatyn Water Order 1881 Order authorising the construction and maintenance of Waterworks and the supply of Water in the township of Uwch-lan, and in the townships, extra-parochial places, and parishes of Cwm, Trecastle, Dyserth (with Ocher-y-Focl), Rhyd, Meliden, and Prestatyn, in the county of Flint.	
	Harwich Water Order 1881 Order authorising the maintenance and continuance of Waterworks, the construction of additional Waterworks, and the supply of Water to the borough of Harwich, in the county of Essex.	
	Henley-on-Thames Water Order 1881 Order empowering the Henley-on-Thames Water Company, Limited, to construct Waterworks and to supply Waler in the town and parish of Henley-on-Thames and the adjacent portion of the parish of Rotherfield Greys, in the county of Oxford, and in a portion of the parish of Remenham, in the county of Berks.	
	Newport and Pillgwenlly Water Order 1881 Order empowering the Newport and Pillgwenlly Waterworks Company to raise additional Capital.	
	Newhaven and Seaford Water Order 1881 Order authorising the amalgamation of the Water Undertakings respectively authorised by the Newhaven and Denton Water Order, 1880, and the East Blatchington and Seaford Water Order, 1880.	
	Poole Water Order 1881 Order empowering the Poole Waterworks Company to raise additional Capital.	
Alsager Chapel (Marriages) Act 1881 (repealed)	44 & 45 Vict. c. clxvi	11 August 1881
An Act to legalize certain Marriages celebrated in the Chapel at Alsager, in the parish of Barthomley. (Repealed by Statute Law (Repeals) Act 1977 (c. 18))
Education Department Provisional Order Confirmation (London) Act 1881	44 & 45 Vict. c. clxvii	11 August 1881
An Act to confirm a Provisional Order made by the Education Department under the Elementary Education Act, 1870, to enable the School Board for London to put in force the Lands Clauses Consolidation Act, 1845, and the Acts amending the same.
	London Order 1881 The School Board for London. Provisional Order for putting in force the Lands Clauses Consolidation Act, 1845.	
Bristol Dock Act 1881	44 & 45 Vict. c. clxviii	11 August 1881
An Act to extend and amend the powers of the Mayor, Aldermen, and Burgesses of the City of Bristol as to the taking of Dues and Charges for the use of their Docks, and to make further provisions for the accommodation of the Trade of the Port of Bristol; and for other purposes.
Caledonian Railway (Partick Siding) Act 1881	44 & 45 Vict. c. clxix	11 August 1881
An Act for enabling the Caledonian Railway Company to make a Railway Siding, and acquire Lands at Partick; and for other purposes.
Lea Bridge, Leyton and Walthamstow Tramways Act 1881	44 & 45 Vict. c. clxx	11 August 1881
An Act to authorise the construction of Tramways in the counties of Middlesex and Essex; and for other purposes.
Reading Corporation Act 1881	44 & 45 Vict. c. clxxi	11 August 1881
An Act to provide for the better local government and improvement of the borough of Reading, to amend the Reading School Act, 1867, (Note: Reading School Act 1867 (30 & 31 Vict. c. 5 Pr.)) and to make further provision for the raising of money by the corporation of the said borough; and for other purposes.
South Metropolitan Gas Act 1881	44 & 45 Vict. c. clxxii	11 August 1881
An Act to authorise the South Metropolitan Gas Company to purchase additional lands, construct new works, and raise further capital, and to amend their Acts; and for other purposes.
Southwark and Deptford Tramways Act 1881	44 & 45 Vict. c. clxxiii	11 August 1881
An Act to authorise the Southwark and Deptford Tramways Company to construct additional Tramways; to raise further Capital; and for other purposes.
Medway Conservancy Act 1881	44 & 45 Vict. c. clxxiv	11 August 1881
An Act to provide for the conservancy of the River Medway, and for the regulation, management, and improvement thereof.
Uxbridge and Rickmansworth Railway Act 1881 (repealed)	44 & 45 Vict. c. clxxv	11 August 1881
An Act for making a Railway from Uxbridge, in the county of Middlesex, to Rickmansworth, in the county of Hertford; and for other purposes. (Repealed by Uxbridge and Rickmansworth Railway (Abandonment) Act 1888 (51 & 52 Vict. c. x))
Edinburgh Street Tramways Act 1881 (repealed)	44 & 45 Vict. c. clxxvi	11 August 1881
An Act to enable the Edinburgh Street Tramways Company to make and maintain additional Tramways, and to convert part of the Portobello lines into a double line of Tramway, and to confer other powers upon the said Company. (Repealed by Edinburgh Corporation Order Confirmation Act 1932 (22 & 23 Geo. 5. c. vii))
Staines and West Drayton Railway Act 1881	44 & 45 Vict. c. clxxvii	11 August 1881
An Act to authorise the Staines and West Drayton Railway Company to divert a portion of their authorised Railway near West Drayton; and for other purposes.
Oban Burgh Act 1881	44 & 45 Vict. c. clxxviii	11 August 1881
An Act for extending the municipal and police boundaries of the burgh of Oban, in the county of Argyll; for increasing the number of magistrates and councillors of the burgh; for regulating the management and maintenance of roads; for providing an improved supply of Water; and for other purposes.
Nar Valley Drainage Act 1881	44 & 45 Vict. c. clxxix	11 August 1881
An Act to make provision for the Drainage of the lands in the valley of the River Nar, in the county of Norfolk; and for other purposes relating thereto.
Oldbury Railway Act 1881	44 & 45 Vict. c. clxxx	11 August 1881
An Act to change the name of the Dudley and Oldbury Junction Railway Company; to confer further powers on that Company and on the Great Western Railway Company; and for other purposes.
Great Southern and Western Railway (Killorglin Railway Transfer) Act 1881	44 & 45 Vict. c. clxxxi	11 August 1881
An Act for the transfer of the Powers of the Killorglin Railway Company to the Great Southern and Western Railway Company; and for other purposes.
Chambers and Offices Act 1881	44 & 45 Vict. c. clxxxii	11 August 1881
An Act to facilitate the management of blocks of buildings occupied in sections as separate tenements, and the disposal of each separate tenement; and for that purpose to incorporate a Company with powers of management, and also powers to erect and promote the erection of such buildings, and other powers.
North British Railway (General Powers) Act 1881	44 & 45 Vict. c. clxxxiii	11 August 1881
An Act to authorise the North British Railway Company to make a Railway in the county of Cumberland; to stop up part of the Glasgow, Dumbarton, and Helensburgh Railway; to raise additional Capital and for other purposes.
South London Tramways Act 1881	44 & 45 Vict. c. clxxxiv	11 August 1881
An Act to authorise the South London Tramways Company to construct additional Tramways; to raise further Money; and for other purposes.
Whitland and Cardigan Railway Act 1881	44 & 45 Vict. c. clxxxv	11 August 1881
An Act to confer further powers on the Whitland and Cardigan Railway Company, and to authorise a diversion of part of their authorised line; and for other purposes.
Annan Waterfoot Dock and Railway Act 1881	44 & 45 Vict. c. clxxxvi	11 August 1881
An Act for incorporating a Company and authorising them to make and maintain a Dock Railway and other works at Annan; and for other purposes.
Copland's Patent Act 1881	44 & 45 Vict. c. clxxxvii	11 August 1881
An Act for rendering valid certain Letters Patent granted to Henry Syed Smart Copland for improvements in the formation of roads or ways with wood paving with or without rails and in apparatus for the purpose.
Furness Railway Act 1881	44 & 45 Vict. c. clxxxviii	11 August 1881
An Act for conferring further powers on the Furness Railway Company for the construction of Works, the raising of Money, and otherwise in relation to their undertaking; and for other purposes.
Oxted and Groombridge Railway Act 1881	44 & 45 Vict. c. clxxxix	11 August 1881
An Act for incorporating the Oxted and Groombridge Railway Company; and for other purposes.
Banbury and Cheltenham Direct Railway Act 1881	44 & 45 Vict. c. cxc	11 August 1881
An Act to empower the Banbury and Cheltenham Direct Railway Company to raise further Money, and to alter the levels of a portion of their authorised Railway; to extend the time limited for the construction of their Railways; and for other purposes.
Stalybridge Extension and Improvement Act 1881	44 & 45 Vict. c. cxci	11 August 1881
An Act to extend the Borough of Stalybridge, and to confer further powers upon the Corporation of that Borough.
Metropolitan Bridges Act 1881	44 & 45 Vict. c. cxcii	11 August 1881
An Act for enabling the Metropolitan Board of Works to construct new Bridges over the Thames at Putney and Battersea, with approaches thereto; to alter and reconstruct Vauxhall and Deptford Creek Bridges; for amending the Metropolis Toll Bridges Act, 1877; (Note: Metropolis Toll Bridges Act 1877 (40 & 41 Vict. c. xcix)) and for other purposes.
Southport and Cheshire Lines Extension Railway Act 1881	44 & 45 Vict. c. cxciii	11 August 1881
An Act for making a Railway in Lancashire, to be called the Southport and Cheshire Lines Extension Railway; and for other purposes.
Cork and Kenmare Railway Act 1881 (repealed)	44 & 45 Vict. c. cxciv	11 August 1881
An Act to authorise the construction of a Railway from the town of Macroom, in the county of Cork, to the town of Kenmare, in the county of Kerry; and for other purposes. (Repealed by Kenmare Junction Railway (Abandonment) Act 1890 (53 & 54 Vict. c. xlviii))
South Eastern Railway Act 1881	44 & 45 Vict. c. cxcv	11 August 1881
An Act to confer on the South-eastern Railway Company further powers with reference to their own undertakings, and those of other Companies; and for other purposes.
Rosebush and Fishguard Railway Act 1881	44 & 45 Vict. c. cxcvi	11 August 1881
An Act to authorise a deviation of part of the Rosebush and Fishguard Railway; to extend the time for the compulsory purchase of Lands for and for the completion of other part of that Railway; to authorise the sale or lease of the Narberth Road and Maenclochog Railway to the Rosebush and Fishguard Railway Company; to enable the last mentioned Company to raise further Money; and for other purposes.
London (City) Tithes (St. Botolph Without Aldgate) Act 1881	44 & 45 Vict. c. cxcvii	11 August 1881
An Act to commute the Tithes in the Parish of St. Botolph Without, Aldgate, in the City of London; and for other purposes.
Greenwich Dock and Railway Act 1881	44 & 45 Vict. c. cxcviii	11 August 1881
An Act to authorise the construction of a Dock and Railway at Greenwich, in the county of Kent, to be called "The Greenwich Dock and Railway"; and for other purposes.
Lynn and Fakenham Railway Act 1881	44 & 45 Vict. c. cxcix	11 August 1881
An Act to confer further powers on the Lynn and Fakenham, Yarmouth and North Norfolk, and Yarmouth Union Railway Companies.
Belfast, Holywood and Bangor Railway Act 1881	44 & 45 Vict. c. cc	11 August 1881
An Act to authorise the Belfast, Holywood, and Bangor Railway Company to lay down additional narrow gauge rails on their Railway; to raise additional Capital; to use steam vessels between Belfast, Holywood, and Bangor; and for other purposes.
Great North of Scotland Railway Act 1881	44 & 45 Vict. c. cci	11 August 1881
An Act to confirm the transfer of the Morayshire Railway to the Great North of Scotland Railway Company; and for other purposes.
Teign Valley Railway Act 1881	44 & 45 Vict. c. ccii	11 August 1881
An Act to confer further powers on the Teign Valley Railway Company in relation to their undertaking; and for other purposes.
Manufacturers' and Millowners' Mutual Aid Association Act 1881	44 & 45 Vict. c. cciii	11 August 1881
An Act to incorporate and confer powers on the Manufacturers' and Millowners' Mutual Aid Association for facilitating the cleansing and preventing the pollution of rivers and streams of running water.
Cork Improvement (Extension of Time) Act 1881	44 & 45 Vict. c. cciv	11 August 1881
An Act to grant further time for the completion of the Anglesea Bridge authorised by the Cork Improvement Act, 1875. (Note: Cork Improvement Act 1875 (38 & 39 Vict. c. cix))
Severn Navigation Act 1881	44 & 45 Vict. c. ccv	22 August 1881
An Act to increase the number of the Severn Commissioners; to regulate and alter the construction of their Weirs; to amend the Severn Navigation Acts; and for other purposes.
Brighton and Hove Gas Act 1881	44 & 45 Vict. c. ccvi	22 August 1881
An Act to provide for the amalgamation of the Brighton Gaslight and Coke Company with the Brighton and Hove General Gas Company, and to authorise the said Company to purchase the undertaking of the Aldrington, Hove, and Brighton Gas Company; to acquire lands; and for other purposes.
Caterham Spring Water Company's Act 1881	44 & 45 Vict. c. ccvii	22 August 1881
An Act to authorise a lease of the Kenley Waterworks to the Caterham Spring Water Company; to increase the number of directors of the Company, and to enable them to raise further money; and for other purposes.
Great Western Railway Act 1881	44 & 45 Vict. c. ccviii	22 August 1881
An Act for conferring upon the Great Western Railway Company further powers in connexion with their own and other undertakings, and for conferring upon other Companies further powers in connexion with undertakings in which they are jointly interested with the Company; for vesting in the Company the undertaking of the Coleford, Monmouth, Usk, and Pontypool Railway Company; for extending the respective periods now limited for the completion of the Ross and Ledbury and the Newent Railways; for the abandonment of the Fal Valley Branch Railway; and for other purposes.
South Western Railway Act 1881	44 & 45 Vict. c. ccix	22 August 1881
An Act for authorising the London and South-western Railway Company to construct new Railways in the county of Surrey, to extend their Lymington Branch Railway, to execute further works, and to purchase additional lands for the improvement of their existing Railways and stations; to provide for the apportionment of the consideration for the purchase or lease of the Mid Hants Railway, and the dissolution of the Mid Hants Railway Company; and for other purposes.
Rotherham and Bawtry Railway Act 1881 (repealed)	44 & 45 Vict. c. ccx	22 August 1881
An Act to incorporate a Company for the Construction of the Rotherham and Bawtry Railway; and for other purposes. (Repealed by Rotherham and Bawtry Railway (Abandonment) Act 1888 (51 & 52 Vict. c. cc))
Carmarthen and Cardigan Railway Act 1881	44 & 45 Vict. c. ccxi	22 August 1881
An Act to authorise the Carmarthen and Cardigan Railway Company to sell their undertaking to the Great Western Railway Company, and for extending the Carmarthen and Cardigan Railway to Newcastle Emlyn; and for other purposes.
Kingston and London Railway Act 1881	44 & 45 Vict. c. ccxii	22 August 1881
An Act for making a railway from the London and South-western Railway Company's Station at Surbiton to the Fulham Extension of the Metropolitan District Railway Company at Fulham; and for other purposes.
Belfast and County Down Railway (Newcastle Transfer) Act 1881	44 & 45 Vict. c. ccxiii	22 August 1881
An Act to transfer to the Belfast and County Down Railway Company the Downpatrick, Dundrum, and Newcastle Railway; and for other purposes.
Belfast, Strandtown and High Holywood Railway Act 1881	44 & 45 Vict. c. ccxiv	22 August 1881
An Act for incorporating the Belfast, Strandtown, and High Holywood Railway Company; and for other purposes.
Ballyclare, Ligoniel and Belfast Junction Railway Act 1881	44 & 45 Vict. c. ccxv	22 August 1881
An Act for incorporating the Ballyclare, Ligoniel, and Belfast Junction Railway Company; and for other purposes.
Clonakilty Extension Railway Act 1881	44 & 45 Vict. c. ccxvi	22 August 1881
An Act to authorise the construction of a railway in the county of Cork, to be called the Clonakilty Extension Railway; and for other purposes.
Belfast and Northern Counties Railway Act 1881	44 & 45 Vict. c. ccxvii	22 August 1881
An Act to authorise the Belfast and Northern Counties Railway Company to construct branch lines of railway from King's Bog to Ballyclare, and from Ballyclare to Doagh; to extend the time limited by the Belfast and Northern Counties Railway Act, 1878, (Note: Belfast and Northern Counties Railway Act 1878 (41 & 42 Vict. c. cxviii)) for the purchase of lands and completion of the railway by that Act authorised; to subscribe towards the construction of a tramway at Carrickfergus; to erect or subscribe towards the erection of Hotels at Portrush and Giant's Causeway; to lend money to the Ballymena, Cushendall, and Redbay Railway Company instead of taking shares in the capital of that Company; and for other purposes.
Erne Lough and River Act 1881	44 & 45 Vict. c. ccxviii	27 August 1881
An Act to explain and amend the Erne Lough and River Acts, 1876 (Note: Erne Lough and River Act 1876 (39 & 40 Vict. c. ccxxxvii)) and 1879. (Note: Erne Lough and River Act 1879 (42 & 43 Vict. c. ccxxii))
Solent Navigation Act 1881	44 & 45 Vict. c. ccxix	27 August 1881
An Act to make provision with respect to the navigation of the Solent between the Isle of Wight and the Mainland, in the county of Hants.

=== Private and personal acts ===
Short title	Citation	Royal assent
Long title
Redcastle and Tarradale Estates Act 1881	44 & 45 Vict. c. 1 Pr.	11 August 1881
An Act to authorise a certain charge on the estates of Redcastle and Tarradale in the county of Ross.
Earl of Hardwicke's Estate Act 1881	44 & 45 Vict. c. 2 Pr.	11 August 1881
An Act to enable the Trustees of the Earl of Hardwicke's Settled Estates to raise money for payment of his debts and for vesting in such Trustees his Life Interest in the Settled Estates and also for vesting in them certain pictures and other effects in the mansion of Wimpole as heirlooms and for other purposes in relation thereto.
Ellon Trust Estates Act 1881	44 & 45 Vict. c. 3 Pr.	11 August 1881
An Act to authorise the Trustees of the deceased Alexander Gordon of Ellon, in the county of Aberdeen, to sell certain lands to pay debts; and for other purposes.
Bagot Estate Act 1881	44 & 45 Vict. c. 4 Pr.	11 August 1881
An Act for giving effect to a Compromise of a Suit concerning the last Will and Testament of the late Christopher Neville Bagot deceased and for modifying certain of the Trusts of his said will affecting his Estates in the counties of Galway and Roscommon in Ireland.
Croker Estates Act 1881	44 & 45 Vict. c. 5 Pr.	11 August 1881
An Act for giving further effect to a compromise of certain Opposing Claims affecting the Croker Estates in the county of Limerick in Ireland.
St. John's Hospital Bedford Act 1881	44 & 45 Vict. c. 6 Pr.	11 August 1881
An Act for the better regulation of the Hospital of Saint John the Baptist in the Town of Bedford and to provide for the separation of the Rectory of the Parish of Saint John the Baptist in the Town of Bedford from the Mastership of the said Hospital.

=== Sources ===
- Public General Statutes. Vol. 17 – via Google Books.
- The Public General Statutes, Volume 17: 44 & 45 Victoria – 1881 – via Internet Archive.

== See also ==
- List of acts of the Parliament of the United Kingdom
