= Alkali, &c. Works Regulation Act 1906 =

Act of the Parliament of the United Kingdom

Alkali, &c. Works Regulation Act 1906 (Note: Section 31.)
- Act of Parliament
- Parliament of the United Kingdom
- Long title: An Act to consolidate and amend the Alkali, &c. Works Regulation Acts, 1881 and 1892.
- Citation: 6 Edw. 7. c. 14
- Territorial extent: United Kingdom

Dates
- Royal assent: 4 August 1906
- Commencement: 1 January 1907 (Note: Section 31.)
- Repealed: England and Wales: 16 December 1996 (Note: The Environmental Protection Act 1990 (Commencement No. 18) Order 1996.); Scotland: 1 December 1994 (Note: The Environmental Protection Act 1990 (Commencement No. 16) Order 1994.); Northern Ireland: (Note: The Industrial Pollution Control (Northern Ireland) Order 1997.)
Other legislation
Amends	See § Repealed enactments
Repeals/revokes	See § Repealed enactments
Amended by	Statute Law Revision Act 1927; Local Government Act 1933; Local Government (Scotland) Act 1947; Clean Air Act 1956; London Government Act 1963; Local Government Act 1972; Control of Pollution Act 1974; Clean Air Enactments (Repeals and Modifications) Regulations 1974; Health and Safety (Emissions into the Atmosphere) Regulations 1983; Statute Law (Repeals) Act 1989; Control of Industrial Air Pollution (Registration of Works) Regulations 1989; Health and Safety (Training for Employment) Regulations 1990; Environment Act 1995
Repealed by	England and Wales and Scotland: Environmental Protection Act 1990; Northern Ireland: Industrial Pollution Control (Northern Ireland) Order 1997

Status: Repealed

Text of statute as originally enacted

Revised text of statute as amended

The Alkali, &c. Works Regulation Act 1906 (6 Edw. 7. c. 14) was an act of the Parliament of the United Kingdom that consolidated enactments related to the regulation of alkali works and certain other industrial works in which noxious or offensive gases are evolved in the United Kingdom.

== Provisions ==
=== Repealed enactments ===
Section 30 of the act repealed 3 enactments, listed in the second schedule to the act.

Citation	Short title	Extent of repeal
44 & 45 Vict. c. 37	Alkali, &c. Works Regulation Act 1881	The whole act.
47 & 48 Vict. c. clvii	Local Government Board's Provisional Order Confirmation (Salt Works) Act 1884	The whole act.
55 & 56 Vict. c. 30	Alkali, &c. Works Regulation Act 1892	The whole act.

== Subsequent developments ==
The whole act was repealed, so far as unrepealed, by section 162(2) of, and part I of schedule 16 to, the Environmental Protection Act 1990. The repeal came into force for England and Wales on 1 December 1994 for specified purposes and on 16 December 1996 otherwise.
