= Agricultural gang =

Historical practice of group contract farm labour in eastern England

Agricultural gangs were historically groups of women, girls and boys organized by an independent gang-master who did not own the land, under whose supervision they executed agricultural piece-work for farmers in certain parts of England for a payment negotiated between the gangmaster and farmer. They were sometimes called "public gangs" to distinguish them from "private gangs", consisting of workers engaged by the farmer himself, and undertaking work solely for him, under his own supervision or under that of one of his men.

The system was long prevalent in the counties of Cambridgeshire, Huntingdonshire, Lincolnshire, Nottinghamshire, Norfolk and Suffolk, and in a much modified form in The Fens, which lies within some of those counties. The practice dates from the latter years of the reign of George III, when the low-lying, marshy lands surrounding the basin of the wash were being rapidly drained and converted into rich alluvial districts.

The unreformed condition of the Poor Law, under which the support of the poor fell upon each individual parish, instead of a union of parishes, made landlords reluctant to erect cottages on the reclaimed land for the benefit of their tenants. Labour had to be obtained for the cultivation of these new lands. Women, girls and boys, being cheaper than men to employ, consequently made up the majority. The suffering resulting from this nomadic life and the poor treatment by gangmasters, often involving long hours for poor pay, was so great that an inquiry into the condition of agricultural child labour was included in the reference to the commission on child-labour appointed in 1862, and the results were so startling that the "Agricultural Gangs Act" was passed in 1867, forbidding the employment of any child under eight years old, any child below ten years old without evidence of two hundred and fifty school attendances within the past year, any child above ten without evidence of one hundred and fifty school attendances in the past year, and of any female under a male gangmaster, unless a female licensed to act as gangmistress were also present.

Gang-masters were required to be licensed by two justices, and could not hold a liquor licence. The distance to be traversed on foot was fixed by the justices, and the licences were to be renewed every six months. Later legislation made more stringent the regulations under which children were employed in agricultural gangs. By the Elementary Education Act 1876 (39 & 40 Vict. c. 70), repealing and re-enacting the principal provisions of the Agricultural Children Act (36 & 37 Vict. c. 67), no child should be employed under the age of eleven years, and none between eleven years and thirteen years before the child has obtained a certificate of having reached the standard of education fixed by a by-law in force in the district.
