= Coffee, etc. Act 1814 =

Act of the Parliament of the United Kingdom

- Act of Parliament
- Parliament of the United Kingdom
- Long title: An Act to continue, until the Twenty-fifth Day of March One thousand eight hundred and seventeen, an Act of the Fifty-second Year of His present Majesty, to regulate the Separation of Damaged from Sound Coffee, and to permit Dealers to send out any Quantity of Coffee not exceeding Eight Pounds Weight, without Permit.
- Citation: 54 Geo. 3. c. 47
- Territorial extent: United Kingdom

Dates
- Royal assent: 19 April 1814
- Commencement: 19 April 1814 (Note: The Acts of Parliament (Commencement) Act 1793.)
- Expired: 25 March 1817 (Note: Section 1.)
- Repealed: 5 August 1873

Other legislation
- Amends: Coffee, etc. Act 1812
- Repealed by: Statute Law Revision Act 1873

Status: Repealed

Text of statute as originally enacted

The Coffee, etc. Act 1814 (54 Geo. 3. c. 47) was an act of the Parliament of the United Kingdom that continued, until 25 March 1817, an earlier act regulating the sale of coffee by dealers in the United Kingdom.

== Provisions ==
=== Continued enactments ===
Section 1 of the act continued the Coffee, etc. Act 1812 (52 Geo. 3. c. 149) until 25 March 1817.

== Subsequent developments ==
The whole act was repealed by section 1 of, and the schedule to, the Statute Law Revision Act 1873 (36 & 37 Vict. c. 91), which came into force on 5 August 1873.
