= Havant Thicket Reservoir =

Reservoir in Hampshire, England

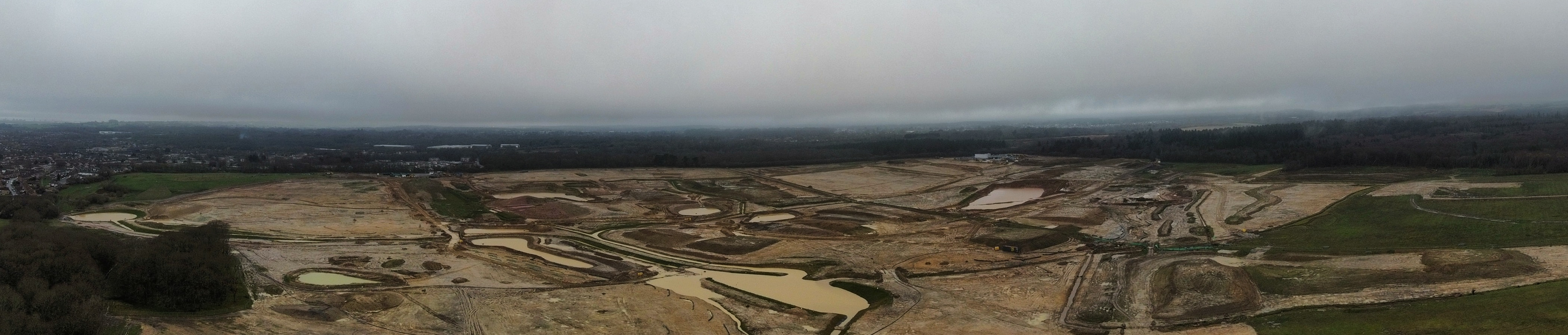
- Havant Thicket Reservoir Construction
- Interactive map of Havant Thicket Reservoir
- Coordinates: 50.88274°N 0.98756°W

Havant Thicket Reservoir is a reservoir currently under construction to the north of the town of Havant in Hampshire, England. It is the first reservoir to be built in Britain in over 30 years.

== History ==
The reservoir is a joint initiative between two water companies, Portsmouth Water and Southern Water and, when completed, it will span 160 hectares (400 acres) with an anticipated capacity of 8,700,000,000 litres (1.9×10^{9} imp gal; 2.3×10^{9} US gal). It will supply an average of 21,000,000 litres (4,600,000 imp gal; 5,500,000 US gal) of water per day and allow Southern Water to reduce the volume it extracts from the rivers Test and Itchen (typically 166,000,000 litres (37,000,000 imp gal; 44,000,000 US gal) annually. The reservoir was approved in June 2021, with an anticipated completion date of 2029. By February 2026, the expected date of opening was 2031 with an estimated cost of £340 million. However, by September 2026, the expected opening date had been pushed back to 2034 with an estimated cost more than doubling to £800 million.

The site is bounded to the north by Havant Thicket, an area of forestry managed by Forestry England, to the east by Staunton Country Park and by the Leigh Park area of Havant to the south. It will straddle the border between the Borough of Havant and East Hampshire District. The site is underlain by clay, silt and sand of the London Clay Formation and, in small part, of the Lambeth Group. The current valley floor is characterised by head deposits.

Inflow of water to the site will be piped from natural springs in the Bedhampton area. This will occur when rainfall is heavy and the water would simply otherwise flow out to the sea.

The reservoir is expected to measure 1.7 kilometres (1.1 mi) from east to west, and be between 800 metres (2,600 ft) and 1,200 metres (3,900 ft) north to south. The perimeter will measure 5.2 kilometres (3.2 mi) and the deepest point will be 21 metres (69 ft). Havant Thicket will be the first reservoir to be built in Britain since the early 1990s.
