= Agricultural Gangs Act 1867 =

Act of the Parliament of the United Kingdom

Agricultural Gangs Act 1867 (Note: Section 1.)
- Act of Parliament
- Parliament of the United Kingdom
- Long title: An Act for the Regulation of Agricultural Gangs.
- Citation: 30 & 31 Vict. c. 130
- Territorial extent: England and Wales (Note: Section 12.)

Dates
- Royal assent: 20 August 1867
- Commencement: 1 January 1868 (Note: Section 2.)
- Repealed: 13 December 1966
Other legislation
Repealed by	Local Government Act 1966

Status: Repealed

Text of statute as originally enacted

The Agricultural Gangs Act 1867 (30 & 31 Vict. c. 130) was an act of the Parliament of the United Kingdom.

It provided regulations for the employment of women and children in agricultural gangs, and for the licensing of gang-masters.

The act stipulated that no child under eight was permitted to be employed on an agricultural gang, that no female was to be employed on the same gang as males, and that no female was to be employed under a male gang-master unless a female gang-master was also present. Any gang-master in breach of these conditions was guilty of an offence and liable to a penalty of not more than 20s for each person employed, as was the occupier of the land on which the gang was employed, unless he could prove it took place without his knowledge.

The act also required gang-masters to be licensed. These licences were to be granted by two or more magistrates at petty sessions, on evidence that the applicant was of good character and a fit person to be licensed; they were valid for a period of six months before requiring renewal, at a fee of 1s. Licences were not to be granted to the keepers of public houses. A gang-master acting without a licence was to incur a penalty not exceeding 20s per day of acting without a licence.

Any conviction of a gang-master on an offence under the act would endorse his licence. On a second endorsement, the licence could be withheld for up to three months. A third allowed the licence to be withheld for up to two years, and a fourth prevented them from ever receiving or holding a licence in the future.

== Subsequent developments ==
The whole act was repealed by section 43(2) of, and part I of schedule 6 to, the Local Government Act 1966, which came into force on 13 December 1966.

== See also ==
- Agricultural Children Act 1873

== Bibliography ==
- Moore's Almanack improved: or Will's farmer's and countryman's calendar for the year 1869. Joseph Greenhill, London, 1869
