= List of acts of the Parliament of the United Kingdom from 1873 =

This is a complete list of acts of the Parliament of the United Kingdom for the year 1873.

Note that the first parliament of the United Kingdom was held in 1801; parliaments between 1707 and 1800 were either parliaments of Great Britain or of Ireland). For acts passed up until 1707, see the list of acts of the Parliament of England and the list of acts of the Parliament of Scotland. For acts passed from 1707 to 1800, see the list of acts of the Parliament of Great Britain. See also the list of acts of the Parliament of Ireland.

For acts of the devolved parliaments and assemblies in the United Kingdom, see the list of acts of the Scottish Parliament, the list of acts of the Northern Ireland Assembly, and the list of acts and measures of Senedd Cymru; see also the list of acts of the Parliament of Northern Ireland.

The number shown after each act's title is its chapter number. Acts passed before 1963 are cited using this number, preceded by the year(s) of the reign during which the relevant parliamentary session was held; thus the Union with Ireland Act 1800 is cited as "39 & 40 Geo. 3 c. 67", meaning the 67th act passed during the session that started in the 39th year of the reign of George III and which finished in the 40th year of that reign. Note that the modern convention is to use Arabic numerals in citations (thus "41 Geo. 3" rather than "41 Geo. III"). Acts of the last session of the Parliament of Great Britain and the first session of the Parliament of the United Kingdom are both cited as "41 Geo. 3".

Some of these acts have a short title. Some of these acts have never had a short title. Some of these acts have a short title given to them by later acts, such as by the Short Titles Act 1896.

== 36 & 37 Vict. ==
The fifth session of the 20th Parliament of the United Kingdom, which met from 6 February 1873 until 5 August 1873.

=== Public general acts ===
| Short title | Citation | Royal assent |
Long title
| Confirmation of Marriages (Cove Chapel) Act 1873 (repealed) | 36 & 37 Vict. c. 1 | 13 March 1873 |
An Act for legalizing certain Marriages solemnized in Cove Chapel in Pitt Portion in the parish of Tiverton, Devon. (Repealed by Statute Law (Repeals) Act 1977 (c. 18))
| Polling Districts (Ireland) Act 1873 (repealed) | 36 & 37 Vict. c. 2 | 13 March 1873 |
An Act to make special provisions in relation to the Constitution of certain Polling Districts at Parliamentary Elections in Ireland. (Repealed by Statute Law Revision Act 1883 (46 & 47 Vict. c. 39) and Representation of the People Act 1918 (7 & 8 Geo. 5. c. 64))
| Supply Act 1873 (repealed) | 36 & 37 Vict. c. 3 | 29 March 1873 |
An Act to apply certain sums out of the Consolidated Fund to the service of the years ending the thirty-first day of March one thousand eight hundred and seventy-two, one thousand eight hundred and seventy-three, and one thousand eight hundred and seventy-four. (Repealed by Statute Law Revision Act 1883 (46 & 47 Vict. c. 39))
| Somerset House (King's College Lease) Act 1873 (repealed) | 36 & 37 Vict. c. 4 | 29 March 1873 |
An Act to confirm an Agreement for a Lease by the Commissioners of Her Majesty's Works and Public Buildings to the Governors and Proprietors of King's College, London, of a piece of land on the Victoria Embankment annexed to Somerset House, and to give the said Commissioners further powers of leasing the said piece of land. (Repealed by University of London King's College (Lease) Act 1972 (c. iv))
| Epping Forest Act 1873 (repealed) | 36 & 37 Vict. c. 5 | 29 March 1873 |
An Act to extend the time for the Epping Forest Commissioners to make their final Report. (Repealed by Wild Creatures and Forest Laws Act 1971 (c. 47))
| Turks and Caicos Islands Act 1873 (repealed) | 36 & 37 Vict. c. 6 | 4 April 1873 |
An Act to enable Her Majesty by Order in Council to annex the Turks and Caicos Islands to the Colony of Jamaica. (Repealed by Statute Law Revision (No. 2) Act 1893 (56 & 57 Vict. c. 54))
| Endowed Schools (Time of Address) Act 1873 (repealed) | 36 & 37 Vict. c. 7 | 4 April 1873 |
An Act to enlarge the time within which an Address by either House of Parliament against certain Schemes made under the Endowed Schools Act, 1869, (Note: Endowed Schools Act 1869 (32 & 33 Vict. c. 56)) may be presented to Her Majesty. (Repealed by Statute Law Revision Act 1883 (46 & 47 Vict. c. 39))
| Income Tax Act 1873 (repealed) | 36 & 37 Vict. c. 8 | 4 April 1873 |
An Act to make provision for the Assessment of Income Tax, and as to Assessors in the Metropolis. (Repealed by Statute Law Revision Act 1883 (46 & 47 Vict. c. 39))
| Bastardy Laws Amendment Act 1873 (repealed) | 36 & 37 Vict. c. 9 | 24 April 1873 |
An Act to amend the Bastardy Laws. (Repealed by Magistrates' Courts Act 1952 (15 & 16 Geo. 6 & 1 Eliz. 2. c. 55))
| Mutiny Act 1873 (repealed) | 36 & 37 Vict. c. 10 | 24 April 1873 |
An Act for punishing Mutiny and Desertion, and for the better payment of the Army and their Quarters. (Repealed by Statute Law Revision Act 1883 (46 & 47 Vict. c. 39))
| Marine Mutiny Act 1873 (repealed) | 36 & 37 Vict. c. 11 | 24 April 1873 |
An Act for the Regulation of Her Majesty's Royal Marine Forces while on shore. (Repealed by Statute Law Revision Act 1883 (46 & 47 Vict. c. 39))
| Custody of Infants Act 1873 | 36 & 37 Vict. c. 12 | 24 April 1873 |
An Act to amend the Law as to the Custody of Infants.
| Salmon Fishery Commissioners Act 1873 (repealed) | 36 & 37 Vict. c. 13 | 24 April 1873 |
An Act to discontinue the Office of Special Commissioners of Salmon Fisheries in England. (Repealed by Statute Law Revision Act 1883 (46 & 47 Vict. c. 39))
| Portpatrick Harbour Act 1873 | 36 & 37 Vict. c. 14 | 15 May 1873 |
An Act to repeal the Acts relating to the Harbour of Portpatrick in Scotland, and to vest the Lighthouse of Portpatrick in the Commissioners of Northern Lighthouses.
| New Zealand (Roads, &c.) Loan Act 1873 (repealed) | 36 & 37 Vict. c. 15 | 15 May 1873 |
An Act to amend the New Zealand Roads, &c. Loan Act, 1870. (Note: New Zealand Roads, &c. Loan Act 1870 (33 & 34 Vict. c. 40)) (Repealed by Statute Law Revision Act 1950 (14 Geo. 6. c. 6))
| Marriage Law (Ireland) Amendment Act 1873 (repealed) | 36 & 37 Vict. c. 16 | 15 May 1873 |
An Act to amend the Law relating to Marriages in Ireland in certain cases. (Repealed by Statute Law (Repeals) Act 1977 (c. 18))
| East India Stock Dividend Redemption Act 1873 (repealed) | 36 & 37 Vict. c. 17 | 15 May 1873 |
An Act to provide for the Redemption or Commutation of the Dividend on the Capital Stock of the East India Company, and for the transfer of the Security Fund of the India Company to the Secretary of State in Council of India, and for the dissolution of the East India Company. (Repealed by Statute Law Revision Act 1966 (c. 5))
| Customs and Inland Revenue Act 1873 (repealed) | 36 & 37 Vict. c. 18 | 15 May 1873 |
An Act to grant certain Duties of Customs and Inland Revenue, and to alter other Duties. (Repealed by Finance Act 1937 (1 Edw. 8 & 1 Geo. 6. c. 54))
| Poor Allotments Management Act 1873 (repealed) | 36 & 37 Vict. c. 19 | 15 May 1873 |
An Act for making better provision for the management in certain cases of Lands allotted under Local Acts of Inclosure for the benefit of the Poor. (Repealed by Statute Law (Repeals) Act 1993 (c. 50))
| Marriages Confirmation (Fulford Chapel) Act 1873 (repealed) | 36 & 37 Vict. c. 20 | 26 May 1873 |
An Act for legalizing Marriages solemnized in Fulford Chapel, in the Parish of Stone, Staffordshire. (Repealed by Statute Law (Repeals) Act 1977 (c. 18))
| University of Dublin Tests Act 1873 or Fawcett's Act | 36 & 37 Vict. c. 21 | 26 May 1873 |
An Act to abolish Tests in Trinity College and the University of Dublin.
| Australian Colonies Duties Act 1873 (repealed) | 36 & 37 Vict. c. 22 | 26 May 1873 |
An Act to amend the law with respect to Customs Duties in the Australian Colonies. (Repealed by Statute Law (Repeals) Act 1973 (c. 39))
| Superannuation Act Amendment Act 1873 or the Superannuation Acts Amendment Act 1873 (repealed) | 36 & 37 Vict. c. 23 | 26 May 1873 |
An Act to amend the law relating to the grant of Superannuation Allowances and Gratuities to certain persons who entered the permanent Civil Service of the State between the passing of the Superannuation Act, 1859, (Note: Superannuation Act 1859 (22 Vict. c. 26)) and the fourth day of June one thousand eight hundred and seventy. (Repealed by Statute Law Revision Act 1883 (46 & 47 Vict. c. 39))
| Peace Preservation (Ireland) Acts Continuance Act 1873 (repealed) | 36 & 37 Vict. c. 24 | 26 May 1873 |
An Act to continue The Peace Preservation (Ireland) Act, 1870, (Note: Peace Preservation (Ireland) Act 1870 (33 & 34 Vict. c. 9)) and The Protection of Life and Property in certain Parts of Ireland Act, 1871. (Note: Protection of Life and Property in Certain Parts of Ireland Act 1871 (34 & 35 Vict. c. 25)) (Repealed by Statute Law Revision Act 1883 (46 & 47 Vict. c. 39))
| Marriages Confirmation (Gretton Chapel) Act 1873 (repealed) | 36 & 37 Vict. c. 25 | 26 May 1873 |
An Act for legalizing Marriages solemnized in Gretton Chapel, in the Parish of Winchcomb, Gloucestershire. (Repealed by Statute Law (Repeals) Act 1977 (c. 18))
| Supply (No. 2) Act 1873 (repealed) | 36 & 37 Vict. c. 26 | 16 June 1873 |
An Act to apply the sum of Twelve million Pounds out of the Consolidated Fund to the service of the year ending the thirty-first day of March one thousand eight hundred and seventy-four. (Repealed by Statute Law Revision Act 1883 (46 & 47 Vict. c. 39))
| Juries (Ireland) Act 1873 (repealed) | 36 & 37 Vict. c. 27 | 16 June 1873 |
An Act to amend the Law relating to Juries in Ireland. (Repealed by Statute Law Revision Act 1883 (46 & 47 Vict. c. 39))
| Marriages Confirmation (Eton) Act 1873 (repealed) | 36 & 37 Vict. c. 28 | 16 June 1873 |
An Act to render valid Marriages heretofore solemnized in the Chapel of Ease called "Saint John the Evangelist" Chapel, Eton, in the Parish of Eton, in the County of Buckingham. (Repealed by Statute Law (Repeals) Act 1977 (c. 18))
| Customs Sugar Duties (Isle of Man) Act 1873 (repealed) | 36 & 37 Vict. c. 29 | 16 June 1873 |
An Act to alter the Duties of Customs upon Sugar in the Isle of Man. (Repealed by Customs (Isle of Man) Tariff Act 1874 (37 & 38 Vict. c. 46) (Note: Incorrectly cited as "37 & 38 Vict. c. 64" in the Chronological Table of the Statutes.) and Customs Consolidation Act 1876 (39 & 40 Vict. c. 36))
| Registration of Voters (Ireland) Act 1873 (repealed) | 36 & 37 Vict. c. 30 | 16 June 1873 |
An Act to amend the Law of Registration in Ireland so far as relates to the year one thousand eight hundred and seventy-three, and for other purposes relating thereto. (Repealed by Statute Law Revision Act 1883 (46 & 47 Vict. c. 39) and Representation of the People Act 1918 (7 & 8 Geo. 5. c. 64))
| Matrimonial Causes Act 1873 (repealed) | 36 & 37 Vict. c. 31 | 16 June 1873 |
An Act to extend to Suits for Nullity of Marriage the Law with respect to the Intervention of Her Majesty's Proctor and others in Suits in England for dissolving Marriages. (Repealed by Supreme Court of Judicature (Consolidation) Act 1925 (15 & 16 Geo. 5. c. 49))
| East India Loan Act 1873 (repealed) | 36 & 37 Vict. c. 32 | 16 June 1873 |
An Act to enable the Secretary of State in Council of India to raise Money in the United Kingdom for the Service of the Government of India. (Repealed by East India Loans Act 1937 (1 Edw. 8 & 1 Geo. 6. c. 14))
| Municipal Corporations Evidence Act 1873 (repealed) | 36 & 37 Vict. c. 33 | 7 July 1873 |
An Act to facilitate the Proof of Byelaws and Proceedings of Municipal Corporations in England and Wales. (Repealed by Municipal Corporations Act 1882 (45 & 46 Vict. c. 50))
| Grand Jury (Ireland) Act 1873 | 36 & 37 Vict. c. 34 | 7 July 1873 |
An Act to amend an Act passed in a session held in the sixth and seventh years of the reign of King William the Fourth, chapter one hundred and sixteen, intituled "An Act to consolidate and amend the Laws relating to the Presentment of Public Money by Grand Juries in Ireland." (Note: Grand Jury (Ireland) Act 1836 (6 & 7 Will. 4. c. 116))
| County Debentures Act 1873 (repealed) | 36 & 37 Vict. c. 35 | 7 July 1873 |
An Act to amend the Law relating to Securities for Loans contracted by County Authorities. (Repealed by Local Loans Act 1875 (38 & 39 Vict. c. 83))
| Crown Lands Act 1873 (repealed) | 36 & 37 Vict. c. 36 | 7 July 1873 |
An Act for making provision as to certain portions of Her Majesty's Woods, Forests, and Land Revenues, and for other purposes relating thereto. (Repealed by Crown Lands Act 1927 (17 & 18 Geo. 5. c. 23), Statute Law Revision Act 1950 (14 Geo. 6. c. 6) and Crown Estate Act 1961 (9 & 10 Eliz. 2. c. 55))
| Fairs Act 1873 | 36 & 37 Vict. c. 37 | 7 July 1873 |
An Act to amend the Law relating to Fairs in England and Wales.
| Vagrant Act Amendment Act 1873 (repealed) | 36 & 37 Vict. c. 38 | 7 July 1873 |
An Act to amend an Act passed in the fifth year of the reign of His Majesty George the Fourth, chapter eighty-three, intituled "An Act for the punishment of idle and disorderly persons and rogues and vagabonds in that part of Great Britain called England." (Note: Vagrancy Act 1824 (5 Geo. 4. c. 83)) (Repealed by Statute Law Revision (No. 2) Act 1893 (56 & 57 Vict. c. 54), Betting and Gaming Act 1960 (8 & 9 Eliz. 2. c. 60) and Statute Law Revision Act 1966 (c. 5))
| Cathedral Acts Amendment Act 1873 (repealed) | 36 & 37 Vict. c. 39 | 21 July 1873 |
An Act to amend the Act of the third and fourth years of Victoria, chapter one hundred and thirteen, for the Regulation of Cathedrals, and to facilitate the Endowment of Canonries by private benefaction. (Repealed by Cathedrals Measure 1931 (21 & 22 Geo. 5. No. 7))
| Thames Embankment Land Act 1873 or the Thames Embankment Act 1873 | 36 & 37 Vict. c. 40 | 21 July 1873 |
An Act to authorise the acquisition and appropriation by the Metropolitan Board of Works of certain land reclaimed from the River Thames in pursuance of the Thames Embankment Act, 1862. (Note: Thames Embankment Act 1862 (25 & 26 Vict. c. 93))
| Public Schools (Shrewsbury and Harrow Schools Property) Act 1873 (repealed) | 36 & 37 Vict. c. 41 | 21 July 1873 |
An Act to amend the Public Schools Act, 1868, (Note: Public Schools Act 1868 (31 & 32 Vict. c. 118)) as to the Property of Shrewsbury and Harrow Schools. (Repealed by Statute Law (Repeals) Act 1998 (c. 43))
| Tithe Commutation Acts Amendment Act 1873 (repealed) | 36 & 37 Vict. c. 42 | 21 July 1873 |
An Act for amending the Tithe Commutation Acts with respect to Market Gardens. (Repealed by Statute Law Revision (No. 2) Act 1893 (56 & 57 Vict. c. 54))
| Indian Railway Companies Act 1873 (repealed) | 36 & 37 Vict. c. 43 | 21 July 1873 |
An Act to enable Indian Railway Companies to issue and register Shares and Securities in India. (Repealed by Statute Law Revision Act 1964 (c. 79))
| Government Annuities Act 1873 (repealed) | 36 & 37 Vict. c. 44 | 21 July 1873 |
An Act to facilitate the payment of certain annuities for life or years payable by the Commissioners for the Reduction of the National Debt. (Repealed by Government Annuities Act 1929 (19 & 20 Geo. 5. c. 29))
| Canada (Public Works) Loan Act 1873 (repealed) | 36 & 37 Vict. c. 45 | 21 July 1873 |
An Act to authorise the Commissioners of Her Majesty's Treasury to guarantee the payment of a loan to be raised by the Government of Canada for the construction of public works in that country, and to repeal the Canada Defences Loan Act, 1870. (Note: Canada Defences Loan Act 1870 (33 & 34 Vict. c. 82)) (Repealed by Statute Law Revision Act 1883 (46 & 47 Vict. c. 39) and Statute Law Revision Act 1950 (14 Geo. 6. c. 6))
| Blackwater Bridge Act 1873 | 36 & 37 Vict. c. 46 | 21 July 1873 |
An Act to afford facilities for the Transfer to the Grand Juries of the counties of Cork and Waterford of the bridge across the River Blackwater, (Note: Youghal Old Bridge.) near the town of Youghal; and for other purposes relating thereto.
| Blackwater Bridge Debt Act 1873 (repealed) | 36 & 37 Vict. c. 47 | 21 July 1873 |
An Act to amend an Act passed in the session of Parliament held in the thirtieth and thirty-first years of the reign of Her present Majesty, intituled "An Act to authorise the Commissioners of Her Majesty's Treasury to compound the public debt due by the Commissioners of the bridge across the River Blackwater, near the town of Youghal, in the county of Cork, and for the transfer of the said bridge to the Grand Juries of the counties of Cork and Waterford; and for other purposes relating thereto." (Note: Blackwater Bridge Act 1867 (30 & 31 Vict. c. 57)) (Repealed by Statute Law Revision Act 1883 (46 & 47 Vict. c. 39))
| Regulation of Railways Act 1873 | 36 & 37 Vict. c. 48 | 21 July 1873 |
An Act to make better provision for carrying into effect the Railway and Canal Traffic Act, 1854, (Note: Railway and Canal Traffic Act 1854 (17 & 18 Vict. c. 31)) and for other purposes connected therewith.
| Public Works Loan Act 1872 (repealed) | 36 & 37 Vict. c. 49 | 21 July 1873 |
An Act to authorise Advances to the Public Works Loan Commissioners for enabling them to make Loans to School Boards in pursuance of the Elementary Education Act, 1870, (Note: Elementary Education Act 1870 (33 & 34 Vict. c. 75)) and to Sanitary Authorities in pursuance of the Public Health Act, 1872. (Note: Public Health Act 1872 (35 & 36 Vict. c. 79)) (Repealed by Public Works Loans Act 1875 (38 & 39 Vict. c. 89))
| Places of Worship Sites Act 1873 | 36 & 37 Vict. c. 50 | 21 July 1873 |
An Act to afford further facilities for the Conveyance of Land for Sites for Places of Religious Worship and for Burial Places.
| Prison Officers Superannuation (Ireland) Act 1873 (repealed) | 36 & 37 Vict. c. 51 | 28 July 1873 |
An Act to amend the Law relating to the Superannuation of Prison Officers in Ireland. (Repealed by Statute Law Revision Act 1883 (46 & 47 Vict. c. 39), Statute Law Revision (No. 2) Act 1893 (56 & 57 Vict. c. 54) and Statute Law Revision Act (Northern Ireland) 1954 (c. 35 (N.I.)))
| Intestates Act 1873 (repealed) | 36 & 37 Vict. c. 52 | 28 July 1873 |
An Act for the Relief of Widows and Children of Intestates where the personal estate is of small value. (Repealed for England and Wales by County Courts (Amendment) Act 1934 (24 & 25 Geo. 5. c. 17) and for Northern Ireland by Statute Law Revision Act 1950 (14 Geo. 6. c. 6))
| Highland Schools Act 1873 (repealed) | 36 & 37 Vict. c. 53 | 28 July 1873 |
An Act to make better provision respecting certain sums payable to Schoolmasters of Highland Schools under the Act of the session of the first and second years of the reign of Her present Majesty, chapter eighty-seven, intituled "An Act to facilitate the foundation and endowment of additional Schools in Scotland." (Note: Highland Schools Act 1838 (1 & 2 Vict. c. 87)) (Repealed by Statute Law Revision Act 1883 (46 & 47 Vict. c. 39) and Education (Scotland) Act 1946 (9 & 10 Geo. 6. c. 72))
| Exchequer Bonds Act 1873 (repealed) | 36 & 37 Vict. c. 54 | 28 July 1873 |
An Act to raise the sum of one million six hundred thousand pounds sterling by Exchequer Bonds for the service of the year ending on the thirty-first day of March one thousand eight hundred and seventy-four. (Repealed by Statute Law Revision Act 1883 (46 & 47 Vict. c. 39))
| Medical Act (University of London) 1873 (repealed) | 36 & 37 Vict. c. 55 | 28 July 1873 |
An Act to amend the Medical Acts so far as relates to the University of London. (Repealed by Statute Law (Repeals) Act 1977 (c. 18))
| Treasury Chest Fund Act 1873 (repealed) | 36 & 37 Vict. c. 56 | 28 July 1873 |
An Act to reduce the Limit of the available Balance of the Treasury Chest Fund. (Repealed by Treasury Chest Fund Act 1877 (40 & 41 Vict. c. 45))
| Consolidated Fund (Permanent Charges Redemption) Act 1873 (repealed) | 36 & 37 Vict. c. 57 | 28 July 1873 |
An Act to make provision for the Redemption of divers permanent Charges on the Consolidated Fund and on the Votes of Parliament. (Repealed by Statute Law (Repeals) Act 2004 (c. 14))
| Military Manœuvres Act 1873 or the Military Manoeuvres Act 1873 (repealed) | 36 & 37 Vict. c. 58 | 28 July 1873 |
An Act for making provision for facilitating the Manœuvres of Troops to be assembled during the ensuing Autumn. (Repealed by Statute Law Revision Act 1883 (46 & 47 Vict. c. 39))
| Slave Trade (East African Courts) Act 1873 (repealed) | 36 & 37 Vict. c. 59 | 5 August 1873 |
An Act for regulating and extending the Jurisdiction in matters connected with the Slave Trade of the Vice-Admiralty Court at Aden, and of Her Majesty's Consuls under Treaties with the Sovereigns of Zanzibar, Muscat, and Madagascar, and under future Treaties. (Repealed by Statute Law (Repeals) Act 1986 (c. 12))
| Extradition Act 1873 or the Extradition Act (1870) Amendment Act 1873 (repealed) | 36 & 37 Vict. c. 60 | 5 August 1873 |
An Act to amend the Extradition Act, 1870. (Note: Extradition Act 1870 (33 & 34 Vict. c. 52)) (Repealed by Statute Law Revision Act 1950 (14 Geo. 6. c. 6), Extradition Act 1989 (c. 33), Criminal Justice (International Co-operation) Act 1990 (c. 5) and Statute Law (Repeals) Act 2013 (c. 2))
| Crown Private Estates Act 1873 | 36 & 37 Vict. c. 61 | 5 August 1873 |
An Act to explain and amend the Crown Private Estates Act, 1862. (Note: Crown Private Estates Act 1862 (25 & 26 Vict. c. 37))
| Public Schools (Eton College Property) Act 1873 (repealed) | 36 & 37 Vict. c. 62 | 5 August 1873 |
An Act to amend section twenty-four of the Public Schools Act, 1868, with respect to the property of Eton College. (Repealed by Statute Law (Repeals) Act 1973 (c. 39))
| Law Agents (Scotland) Act 1873 (repealed) | 36 & 37 Vict. c. 63 | 5 August 1873 |
An Act to amend the Law relating to Law Agents practising in Scotland. (Repealed by Solicitors (Scotland) Act 1933 (23 & 24 Geo. 5. c. 21))
| Ecclesiastical Commissioners Act 1873 (repealed) | 36 & 37 Vict. c. 64 | 5 August 1873 |
An Act for amending the Ecclesiastical Commissioners Acts, 1840 (Note: Ecclesiastical Commissioners Act 1840 (3 & 4 Vict. c. 113)) and 1850, (Note: Ecclesiastical Commissioners Act 1850 (13 & 14 Vict. c. 94)) and for other purposes. (Repealed by Cathedrals Measure 1963 (No. 2))
| County and City of Dublin Grand Juries Act 1873 (repealed) | 36 & 37 Vict. c. 65 | 5 August 1873 |
An Act to regulate the Summoning of Grand Juries in the Court of Queen's Bench in Ireland. (Repealed by Statute Law (Repeals) Act 1993 (c. 50))
| Supreme Court of Judicature Act 1873 or the Judicature Act 1873 (repealed) | 36 & 37 Vict. c. 66 | 5 August 1873 |
An Act for the constitution of a Supreme Court, and for other purposes relating to the better Administration of Justice in England; and to authorise the transfer to the Appellate Division of such Supreme Court of the Jurisdiction of the Judicial Committee of Her Majesty's Privy Council. (Repealed by Statute Law Revision (No. 2) Act 1893 (56 & 57 Vict. c. 54), Supreme Court of Judicature (Consolidation) Act 1925 (15 & 16 Geo. 5. c. 49), Limitation Act 1939 (2 & 3 Geo. 6. c. 21), Rules of the Supreme Court (Revision) 1962 (SI 1962/2145), Administration of Justice Act 1965 (c. 2) and Rules of the Supreme Court (Revision) 1965 (SI 1965/1776))
| Agricultural Children Act 1873 (repealed) | 36 & 37 Vict. c. 67 | 5 August 1873 |
An Act to regulate the Employment of Children in Agriculture. (Repealed by Elementary Education Act 1876 (39 & 40 Vict. c. 79))
| Militia (Lands and Buildings) Act 1873 | 36 & 37 Vict. c. 68 | 5 August 1873 |
An Act for extending the period of service in the Militia; and for other purposes.
| Petitions of Right (Ireland) Act 1873 (repealed) | 36 & 37 Vict. c. 69 | 5 August 1873 |
An Act to provide for proceeding on Petitions of Right in the Courts of Law and Equity in Ireland. (Repealed by Northern Ireland (Crown Proceedings) Order 1949 (SI 1949/1836))
| Revising Barristers Act 1873 (repealed) | 36 & 37 Vict. c. 70 | 5 August 1873 |
An Act to amend the Law relating to the appointment of Revising Barristers and the holding of Revision Courts. (Repealed by Statute Law Revision Act 1883 (46 & 47 Vict. c. 39) and Representation of the People Act 1918 (7 & 8 Geo. 5. c. 64))
| Salmon Fishery Act 1873 (repealed) | 36 & 37 Vict. c. 71 | 5 August 1873 |
An Act to amend the Law relating to Salmon Fisheries in England and Wales. (Repealed by Salmon and Freshwater Fisheries Act 1923 (13 & 14 Geo. 5. c. 16))
| Defence Acts Amendment Act 1873 | 36 & 37 Vict. c. 72 | 5 August 1873 |
An Act for the amendment of the Defence Acts, 1842 (Note: Defence Act 1842 (5 & 6 Vict. c. 94)) and 1860. (Note: Defence Act 1860 (23 & 24 Vict. c. 112))
| Cambridge Commissioners Act 1873 (repealed) | 36 & 37 Vict. c. 73 | 5 August 1873 |
An Act to amend so much of section four of the Public Health Act, 1872, as relates to the Cambridge Commissioners. (Repealed by Statute Law Revision Act 1883 (46 & 47 Vict. c. 39))
| Royal Irish Constabulary Act 1873 (repealed) | 36 & 37 Vict. c. 74 | 5 August 1873 |
An Act to amend the Laws relating to the Pay of the Royal Irish Constabulary. (Repealed by Statute Law Revision Act 1883 (46 & 47 Vict. c. 39))
| Expiring Laws Continuance Act 1873 (repealed) | 36 & 37 Vict. c. 75 | 5 August 1873 |
An Act to continue various expiring Laws. (Repealed by Statute Law Revision Act 1883 (46 & 47 Vict. c. 39))
| Railway Regulation Act (Returns of Signal Arrangements, Working, &c.) 1873 or the Railway Regulation (Returns of Signal Arrangements, Working, &c.) Act 1873 (repealed) | 36 & 37 Vict. c. 76 | 5 August 1873 |
An Act to make further Provision for the Regulation of Railways. (Repealed for Northern Ireland by Statute Law Revision (Northern Ireland) Act 1976 (c. 12), for England and Wales by Coroners Act 1988 (c. 13) and for Scotland by Statute Law (Repeals) Act 1989 (c. 43))
| Naval Artillery Volunteer Act 1873 (repealed) | 36 & 37 Vict. c. 77 | 5 August 1873 |
An Act to provide for the establishment of a Royal Naval Artillery Volunteer Force. (Repealed by Friendly Societies Act 1875 (38 & 39 Vict. c. 60), Summary Jurisdiction Act 1884 (47 & 48 Vict. c. 43), Statute Law Revision (No. 2) Act 1893 (56 & 57 Vict. c. 54) and Statute Law Revision Act 1953 (2 & 3 Eliz. 2. c. 5))
| Sanitary Act 1866, Ireland, Amendment Act 1873 (repealed) | 36 & 37 Vict. c. 78 | 5 August 1873 |
An Act to amend the Sanitary Act, 1866, (Note: Sanitary Act 1866 (29 & 30 Vict. c. 90)) so far as the same relates to the Nuisance Authorities of Ports in Ireland. (Repealed by Public Health (Ireland) Act 1878 (41 & 42 Vict. c. 52))
| Appropriation Act 1873 (repealed) | 36 & 37 Vict. c. 79 | 5 August 1873 |
An Act to apply a sum out of the Consolidated Fund to the service of the year ending the thirty-first day of March one thousand eight hundred and seventy-four, and to appropriate the Supplies granted in this Session of Parliament. (Repealed by Statute Law Revision Act 1883 (46 & 47 Vict. c. 39))
| Annuity to Duke and Duchess of Edinburgh Act 1873 (repealed) | 36 & 37 Vict. c. 80 | 5 August 1873 |
An Act to enable Her Majesty to provide for the Establishment of His Royal Highness the Duke of Edinburgh and Her Imperial Highness the Grand Duchess Marie Alexandrovna of Russia, and to settle an annuity on Her Imperial Highness. (Repealed by Statute Law Revision Act 1953 (2 & 3 Eliz. 2. c. 5))
| Langbaurgh Coroners Act 1873 (repealed) | 36 & 37 Vict. c. 81 | 5 August 1873 |
An Act to authorise the division of the Wapentake of Langbaurgh in the county of York into Districts for the purpose of Coroners jurisdiction, and the appointment of additional Coroners for the said Wapentake. (Repealed by Statute Law (Repeals) Act 1976 (c. 16))
| Small Penalties (Ireland) Act 1873 (repealed) | 36 & 37 Vict. c. 82 | 5 August 1873 |
An Act to amend the Law relating to Small Penalties in Ireland. (Repealed by Magistrates' Courts Act (Northern Ireland) 1964 (c. 21 (N.I.)))
| Telegraph Act 1873 (repealed) | 36 & 37 Vict. c. 83 | 5 August 1873 |
An Act for explaining the Telegraph Acts, 1868 to 1871, and for enabling a further Sum to be raised for the purposes of the said Acts and of the Pensions Commutation Act, 1872. (Note: Pensions Commutation Act 1872 (35 & 36 Vict. c. 83)) (Repealed by Statute Law Revision Act 1953 (2 & 3 Eliz. 2. c. 5))
| Militia Pay and Storehouses Act 1873 (repealed) | 36 & 37 Vict. c. 84 | 5 August 1873 |
An Act to explain the Militia Pay Acts, 1868 (Note: Militia Pay Act 1868 (31 & 32 Vict. c. 76)) and 1869, (Note: Militia Pay Act 1869 (32 & 33 Vict. c. 66)) and to facilitate the sale of property held for Militia purposes. (Repealed by Militia Act 1882 (45 & 46 Vict. c. 49) and Statute Law Revision Act 1950 (14 Geo. 6. c. 6))
| Merchant Shipping Act 1873 (repealed) | 36 & 37 Vict. c. 85 | 5 August 1873 |
An Act to amend the Merchant Shipping Acts. (Repealed by Merchant Shipping Act 1894 (57 & 58 Vict. c. 60))
| Elementary Education Act 1873 (repealed) | 36 & 37 Vict. c. 86 | 5 August 1873 |
An Act to amend the Elementary Education Act (1870), and for other purposes connected therewith. (Repealed by Education Act 1921 (11 & 12 Geo. 5. c. 51))
| Endowed Schools Act 1873 or the Endowed Schools Act (1869) Amendment Act 1873 (repealed) | 36 & 37 Vict. c. 87 | 5 August 1873 |
An Act to continue and amend the Endowed Schools Act, 1869. (Repealed by Education Act 1973 (c. 16))
| Slave Trade Act 1873 | 36 & 37 Vict. c. 88 | 5 August 1873 |
An Act for consolidating with Amendments the Acts for carrying into effect Treaties for the more effectual Suppression of the Slave Trade, and for other purposes connected with the Slave Trade.
| Gas and Water Works Facilities Act 1870 Amendment Act 1873 (repealed) | 36 & 37 Vict. c. 89 | 5 August 1873 |
An Act to extend and amend the provisions of the Gas and Water Works Facilities Act, 1870. (Note: Gas and Water Works Facilities Act 1870 (33 & 34 Vict. c. 70)) (Repealed for England and Wales by Water Act 1945 (8 & 9 Geo. 6. c. 42), for Scotland by Water (Scotland) Act 1946 (9 & 10 Geo. 6. c. 42), for England and Wales and Scotland by Gas Act 1948 (11 & 12 Geo. 6. c. 67) and for Northern Ireland by Statute Law Revision Act 1883 (46 & 47 Vict. c. 39), Gas Act (Northern Ireland) 1971 (c. 19 (N.I.)) and Water and Sewerage Services (Northern Ireland) Order 1973 (SI 1973/70 (N.I. 2)))
| Annual Turnpike Acts Continuance Act 1873 (repealed) | 36 & 37 Vict. c. 90 | 5 August 1873 |
An Act to continue certain Turnpike Acts in Great Britain, to repeal certain other Turnpike Acts, and for other purposes connected therewith. (Repealed by Statute Law Revision Act 1898 (61 & 62 Vict. c. 22))
| Statute Law Revision Act 1873 | 36 & 37 Vict. c. 91 | 5 August 1873 |
An Act for further promoting the Revision of the Statute Law by repealing certain Enactments which have ceased to be in force or have become unnecessary.

=== Local acts ===
| Short title | Citation | Royal assent |
Long title
| Local Government Board's Provisional Orders Confirmation Act 1873 | 36 & 37 Vict. c. i | 24 March 1873 |
An Act to confirm certain Provisional Orders of the Local Government Board relating to the Districts of Bishop Auckland, Bristol, Cardiff, Ealing, Idle, Lincoln, Newport in Monmouthshire, Warrington, Wigan, and Wrington.
| | Bishop Auckland Order 1873 | |
| | Bristol Order 1873 | |
| | Cardiff Order 1873 | |
| | Ealing Order 1873 | |
| | Idle Order 1873 | |
| | Lincoln Order 1873 | |
| | Newport (Monmouthshire) Order 1873 | |
| | Warrington Order 1873 | |
| | Wigan Order (No. 1) 1873 | |
| | Wigan Order (No. 2) 1873 | |
| | Wrington Order 1873 | |
| Drainage and Improvement of Lands Supplemental (Ireland) (No. 1) Act 1873 | 36 & 37 Vict. c. ii | 29 March 1873 |
An Act to confirm Provisional Orders under "The Drainage and Improvement of Lands Act (Ireland), 1863," (Note: Drainage and Improvement of Lands Act (Ireland) 1863 (26 & 27 Vict. c. 88)) and the Acts amending the same, relating to Mulkear River and Kildare Drainage Districts.
| | Mulkear River Drainage District Order 1873 | |
| | Kildare Drainage District Order 1873 | |
| Sheffield Waterworks Act 1873 (repealed) | 36 & 37 Vict. c. iii | 4 April 1873 |
An Act for amending and extending Enactments relating to the Company of Proprietors of the Sheffield Waterworks; and for other purposes. (Repealed by Sheffield Corporation (Consolidation) Act 1918 (8 & 9 Geo. 5. c. lxi))
| Grantham Waterworks Act 1873 | 36 & 37 Vict. c. iv | 24 April 1873 |
An Act for better supplying with Water Grantham and its neighbourhood, in the county of Lincoln.
| King's Lynn Dock Act 1873 | 36 & 37 Vict. c. v | 24 April 1873 |
An Act to grant further powers to the King's Lynn Dock Company; and for other purposes.
| Vestry of St. Marylebone (Surplus Lands) Act 1873 | 36 & 37 Vict. c. vi | 24 April 1873 |
An Act to enable the Vestry of Saint Marylebone to grant a Lease of, and otherwise deal with, Surplus Lands acquired by them in making Street Improvements.
| Thames Embankment (South) Act 1873 or the Thames Embankment Act 1873 | 36 & 37 Vict. c. vii | 24 April 1873 |
An Act for amending and extending the Thames Embankment Acts, 1863 (Note: Thames Embankment Act 1863 (26 & 27 Vict. c. 75)) and 1864; (Note: Thames Embankment and Metropolis Improvement (Loans) Act 1864 (27 & 28 Vict. c. 61)) and for other purposes.
| Manchester and Milford Railway (Devil's Bridge Branch) Act 1873 | 36 & 37 Vict. c. viii | 15 May 1873 |
An Act to enable the Manchester and Milford Railway Company to construct a Branch Railway to Devil's Bridge; and for other purposes.
| European Assurance Society Arbitration Act 1873 | 36 & 37 Vict. c. ix | 15 May 1873 |
An Act for making provision for Administration of the Reserved Fund of the European Assurance Society; and for other purposes.
| Burgh of Montrose Act 1873 | 36 & 37 Vict. c. x | 15 May 1873 |
An Act to authorise the Town Council of the Burgh of Montrose to sell, feu, or lease the South Links; and for other purposes.
| Leicester Gas Act 1873 | 36 & 37 Vict. c. xi | 15 May 1873 |
An Act for granting further Powers to the Leicester Gas Company.
| Shrewsbury (Kingsland) Bridge Act 1873 | 36 & 37 Vict. c. xii | 15 May 1873 |
An Act for making and maintaining a Bridge across the River Severn at Shrewsbury, with Approaches thereto; and for other purposes.
| South Alloa Dock Act 1873 | 36 & 37 Vict. c. xiii | 15 May 1873 |
An Act to authorise the construction of a Dock at South Alloa, in the county of Stirling; and for other purposes.
| London, Chatham and Dover Railway Act 1873 | 36 & 37 Vict. c. xiv | 15 May 1873 |
An Act to authorise the London Chatham and Dover Railway Company to make Branch Railways to Chatham Dockyard; and for other purposes.
| Drainage and Improvement of Lands Supplemental (Ireland) (No. 2) Act 1873 | 36 & 37 Vict. c. xv | 15 May 1873 |
An Act to confirm a Provisional Order under "The Drainage and Improvement of Lands (Ireland) Act, 1863," and the Acts amending the same, relating to Lough Oughter and River Erne Drainage District.
| | Lough Oughter and River Erne Drainage District Order 1873 | |
| Tavistock Canal Act 1873 | 36 & 37 Vict. c. xvi | 15 May 1873 |
An Act for transferring the Undertaking of the Company of Proprietors of the Tavistock Canal to the Duke of Bedford; and for other purposes.
| Chesterfield Corporation Markets Act 1873 (repealed) | 36 & 37 Vict. c. xvii | 15 May 1873 |
An Act for vesting the Undertaking of the Chesterfield Market Company in the Corporation of Chesterfield; and for other purposes. (Repealed by Chesterfield Corporation Act 1923 (13 & 14 Geo. 5. c. xcix))
| Pontefract Gas Act 1873 | 36 & 37 Vict. c. xviii | 15 May 1873 |
An Act for incorporating and conferring Powers on the Pontefract, Tanshelf, and Carleton Gas Company.
| Wakefield Waterworks Act 1873 (repealed) | 36 & 37 Vict. c. xix | 15 May 1873 |
An Act to authorise the Wakefield Waterworks Company to make a new reservoir, and to raise more money; and for other purposes. (Repealed by West Yorkshire Act 1980 (c. xiv))
| Derby Waterworks Act 1873 | 36 & 37 Vict. c. xx | 15 May 1873 |
An Act for extending the Limits within which the Derby Waterworks Company may supply Water, and for empowering them to construct additional Works and to raise additional Capital; and for other purposes.
| Chigwell, Loughton and Woodford Gas Act 1873 | 36 & 37 Vict. c. xxi | 15 May 1873 |
An Act for dissolving the Chigwell and Woodford Bridge Gas Company [Limited], and for incorporating and conferring powers on the Chigwell, Loughton, and Woodford Gas Company; and for other purposes.
| Education Department Provisional Order Confirmation (No. 2) Act 1873 (repealed) | 36 & 37 Vict. c. xxii | 15 May 1873 |
An Act to confirm a Provisional Order made by the Education Department under "The Elementary Education Act, 1870," (Note: Elementary Education Act 1870 (33 & 34 Vict. c. 75)) to enable the School Board for the parish of Caterham to put in force "The Lands Clauses Consolidation Act, 1845," (Note: Lands Clauses Consolidation Act 1845 (8 & 9 Vict. c. 18)) and the Acts amending the same. (Repealed by Surrey Act 1985 (c. iii))
| | Caterham Order 1873 Provisional Order for putting in force the Lands Clauses Consolidation Act, 1845. | |
| Education Department Provisional Order Confirmation (No. 3) Act 1873 | 36 & 37 Vict. c. xxiii | 15 May 1873 |
An Act to confirm a Provisional Order made by the Education Department under "The Elementary Education Act, 1870," to enable the School Board for London to put in force "The Lands Clauses Consolidation Act, 1845," and the Acts amending the same,
| | London Order 1873 Provisional Order for putting in force the Lands Clauses Consolidation Act, 1845. | |
| Land Drainage Supplemental Act 1873 (repealed) | 36 & 37 Vict. c. xxiv | 15 May 1873 |
An Act to confirm a Provisional Order under "The Land Drainage Act, 1861," (Note: Land Drainage Act 1861 (24 & 25 Vict. c. 133)) relating to Deeping Fen. (Repealed by Statute Law (Repeals) Act 1993 (c. 50))
| Culm Valley Light Railway Act 1873 | 36 & 37 Vict. c. xxv | 15 May 1873 |
An Act for making a railway from the Tiverton Junction Station of the Bristol and Exeter Railway to near Hemyock, all in the County of Devon, to be called the Culm Valley Light Railway; and for other purposes.
| Brighton Aquarium (Capital) Act 1873 (repealed) | 36 & 37 Vict. c. xxvi | 15 May 1873 |
An Act to enable the Brighton Aquarium Company to raise additional Capital. (Repealed by Brighton Corporation Act 1901 (1 Edw. 7. c. ccxxiv))
| Blackpool Sea Water Act 1873 | 36 & 37 Vict. c. xxvii | 15 May 1873 |
An Act for incorporating and conferring Powers on the Blackpool Sea Water Company.
| Aberystwyth Gas Act 1873 | 36 & 37 Vict. c. xxviii | 15 May 1873 |
An Act for incorporating and granting powers to the Aberystwyth Gas Company to enable them to supply with gas the borough of Aberystwyth and its neighbourhood; and for other purposes.
| Chichester Waterworks Act 1873 (repealed) | 36 & 37 Vict. c. xxix | 15 May 1873 |
An Act to incorporate a Company for supplying with Water the City of Chichester and certain Parishes and Places adjacent thereto, in the County of Sussex. (Repealed by Chichester Corporation Water Act 1897 (60 & 61 Vict. c. xlvii))
| Australian Agricultural Company's Act 1873 (repealed) | 36 & 37 Vict. c. xxx | 15 May 1873 |
An Act for granting additional powers to the Australian Agricultural Company, and for amending the Acts relating to that Company; and for other purposes. (Repealed by Australian Agricultural Company Act 1912 (2 & 3 Geo. 5. c. xlviii))
| Penshurst Glebe Act 1873 | 36 & 37 Vict. c. xxxi | 15 May 1873 |
An Act relating to the leasing of part of the Glebe Lands of the Rectory of Penshurst in the County of Kent.
| Swansea Harbour Act 1873 | 36 & 37 Vict. c. xxxii | 15 May 1873 |
An Act to enable the Swansea Harbour Trustees to raise a further sum of money for the purposes of their Undertaking; and for other purposes.
| Neath Gas Act 1873 | 36 & 37 Vict. c. xxxiii | 15 May 1873 |
An Act to authorise the Neath New Gas Company to raise additional capital, and for other purposes.
| Mills' Patent Act 1873 | 36 & 37 Vict. c. xxxiv | 15 May 1873 |
An Act for rendering valid certain Letters Patent granted to Benjamin Joseph Barnard Mills for Improvements in the Manufacture of Boots and Shoes and in Machinery employed therein.
| Sevenoaks, Maidstone and Tonbridge Railway Act 1873 | 36 & 37 Vict. c. xxxv | 26 May 1873 |
An Act for conferring further powers upon the Sevenoaks, Maidstone, and Tunbridge Railway Company for the construction of Works, and otherwise in relation to their undertaking; and for other purposes.
| Glasgow Corporation Waterworks Act 1873 | 36 & 37 Vict. c. xxxvi | 26 May 1873 |
An Act to extend the time for the construction of Works authorised by "The Glasgow Corporation Waterworks Amendment Act, 1866," (Note: Glasgow Corporation Waterworks Amendment Act 1866 (29 & 30 Vict. c. cccxxviii)) and to abandon part of the Works; and for other purposes.
| Glasgow and South-western Railway (Additional Powers) Act 1873 | 36 & 37 Vict. c. xxxvii | 26 May 1873 |
An Act for conferring additional powers on the Glasgow and South-western Railway Company for the construction of railways and works and the acquisition of lands; for defining their capital; and for other purposes connected with their undertaking.
| Glasgow Police Act 1873 (repealed) | 36 & 37 Vict. c. xxxviii | 26 May 1873 |
An Act to enable the Board of Police of Glasgow to make and maintain new streets and other improvements in the city of Glasgow. (Repealed by Statute Law (Repeals) Act 1995 (c. 44))
| Lanarkshire and Glasgow Roads Act 1873 | 36 & 37 Vict. c. xxxix | 26 May 1873 |
An Act for making a new Road or Street in substitution for a portion of the Aitkenhead Road, in the parish of Govan and county of Lanark; for discontinuing as a public thoroughfare the said portion of road; and for other purposes.
| South Eastern Railway Act 1873 | 36 & 37 Vict. c. xl | 26 May 1873 |
An Act to amend and enlarge some of the Powers and Provisions of the Acts relating to the South-eastern Railway Company.
| Worcester, Bromyard and Leominster Railway Act 1873 | 36 & 37 Vict. c. xli | 26 May 1873 |
An Act to revive and extend some of the Powers of the Worcester, Bromyard, and Leominster Railway Company.
| Gas and Water Orders Confirmation Act 1873 | 36 & 37 Vict. c. xlii | 26 May 1873 |
An Act for confirming certain Provisional Orders made by the Board of Trade under The Gas and Water Works Facilities Act, 1870, (Note: Gas and Water Works Facilities Act 1870 (33 & 34 Vict. c. 70)) relating to Abersychan Gas, Ilford Gas, Leominster Gas, Oakengates and St. George's Gas, Redditch Gas, Canterbury Water, Caterham Water, Denbigh Water, Maidstone Water, and Weston-super-Mare Water.
| | Abersychan Gas Order 1873 | |
| | Ilford Gas Order 1873 | |
| | Leominster Gas Order 1873 | |
| | Oakengate and St. George's Gas Order 1873 | |
| | Redditch Gas Order 1873 | |
| | Canterbury Water Order 1873 | |
| | Caterham Water Order 1873 | |
| | Denbigh Water Order 1873 | |
| | Maidstone Water Order 1873 | |
| | Weston-super-Mare Water Order 1873 | |
| Cape Railway Dissolution Act 1873 | 36 & 37 Vict. c. xliii | 26 May 1873 |
An Act to confirm an Agreement between the Cape Railway Company and the Local Government of the Cape of Good Hope for the sale and transfer of the Company's undertaking, and to provide for the winding-up of the affairs of the Company; and for other purposes.
| Rhymney Railway Act 1873 | 36 & 37 Vict. c. xliv | 26 May 1873 |
An Act for authorising the Rhymney Railway Company to abandon their Caerphilly Rumney Branch Railway, and to raise further moneys; and for other purposes.
| Grand Junction Waterworks Act 1873 | 36 & 37 Vict. c. xlv | 26 May 1873 |
An Act to empower the Grand Junction Waterworks Company to acquire additional lands in the parish of Hampton.
| Bristol and Portishead Pier and Railway Act 1873 | 36 & 37 Vict. c. xlvi | 26 May 1873 |
An Act for granting further powers to the Bristol and Portishead Pier and Railway Company.
| Burley Local Board Waterworks Act 1873 | 36 & 37 Vict. c. xlvii | 26 May 1873 |
An Act to authorise the Local Board of Health for the District of Burley to construct Waterworks and supply Water within their District, and to purchase certain existing Waterworks; and for other purposes.
| Ravenglass and Eskdale Railway Act 1873 | 36 & 37 Vict. c. xlviii | 26 May 1873 |
An Act for making a Railway in the county of Cumberland, to be called the Ravenglass and Eskdale Railway; and for other purposes.
| Hull Docks Act 1873 | 36 & 37 Vict. c. xlix | 26 May 1873 |
An Act to enable the Dock Company at Kingston-upon-Hull to raise additional capital.
| Dundee Harbour and Tay Ferries Act 1873 (repealed) | 36 & 37 Vict. c. l | 26 May 1873 |
An Act to vest the Tay Ferries in the Dundee Harbour Trustees, and to authorise them to work and manage the Ferries; and for other purposes. (Repealed by Dundee Harbour and Tay Ferries Consolidation Act 1911 (1 & 2 Geo. 5. c. lxxx))
| Ayr Harbour Amendment Act 1873 | 36 & 37 Vict. c. li | 26 May 1873 |
An Act for amending the Acts relating to the Harbour of Ayr; for altering the constitution of the Ayr Harbour Trust; for enabling the Ayr Harbour Trustees to borrow an additional sum of money; and for other purposes.
| Scarborough Gas Act 1873 (repealed) | 36 & 37 Vict. c. lii | 26 May 1873 |
An Act to extend the powers of the Scarborough Gas Company, and for other purposes. (Repealed by Scarborough Gas (Consolidation) Act 1927 (17 & 18 Geo. 5. c. xcv))
| Scarborough and Whitby Railway Act 1873 | 36 & 37 Vict. c. liii | 26 May 1873 |
An Act to authorise the Scarborough and Whitby Railway Company to extend their line to join the North-eastern Railway at Scarborough, and the Whitby, Redcar, and Middlesborough Union Railway near Whitby, to alter the levels of their authorised lines near Whitby; to raise additional capital; and for other purposes.
| Sheffield and Midland Railway Companies' Committee Act 1873 | 36 & 37 Vict. c. liv | 26 May 1873 |
An Act for conferring further powers upon the Sheffield and Midland Railway Companies Committee and upon the two Companies represented upon that Committee; and for other purposes.
| Pimlico, Peckham and Greenwich Street Tramways (Extension of Time) Act 1873 | 36 & 37 Vict. c. lv | 26 May 1873 |
An Act to extend the time for the completion of certain of the Works authorised by the Pimlico, Peckham, and Greenwich Street Tramways (Extensions) Act, 1870. (Note: Pimlico, Peckham and Greenwich Street Tramways (Extensions) Act 1870 (33 & 34 Vict. c. clxxiv))
| Buxton Local Board Act 1873 | 36 & 37 Vict. c. lvi | 26 May 1873 |
An Act to authorise the Local Board for the district of Buxton to construct Waterworks and supply Water; also to purchase Land for Gasworks; and for other purposes.
| Pontypool Gas and Water Act 1873 | 36 & 37 Vict. c. lvii | 26 May 1873 |
An Act for incorporating and conferring powers on the Pontypool Gas and Water Company.
| Bristol United Gaslight Company's Act 1873 | 36 & 37 Vict. c. lviii | 26 May 1873 |
An Act for conferring further powers on the Bristol United Gaslight Company.
| Crystal Palace District Gas Act 1873 (repealed) | 36 & 37 Vict. c. lix | 26 May 1873 |
An Act to enable the Crystal Palace District Gas Company to raise additional Capital; and for other purposes. (Repealed by South Suburban Gas Act 1928 (18 & 19 Geo. 5. c. lxxx))
| Cleethorpes Pier Act 1873 | 36 & 37 Vict. c. lx | 26 May 1873 |
An Act for extending the time for the completion of the Cleethorpes Promenade Pier, and for amending the Cleethorpes Promenade Pier Order, 1867; and for other purposes.
| Local Government Board (Ireland) Provisional Order (Wexford) Confirmation Act 1873 | 36 & 37 Vict. c. lxi | 16 June 1873 |
An Act to confirm a Provisional Order made by the Local Government Board for Ireland relating to the town and borough of Wexford.
| | Wexford Order 1873 | |
| Oyster and Mussel Fisheries Order Confirmation Act 1873 | 36 & 37 Vict. c. lxii | 16 June 1873 |
An Act to confirm an Order made by the Board of Trade under The Sea Fisheries Act, 1868, (Note: Sea Fisheries Act 1868 (31 & 32 Vict. c. 45)) relating to Bosham.
| | Bosham Fishery Order 1873 | |
| Pier and Harbour Orders Confirmation Act 1873 | 36 & 37 Vict. c. lxiii | 16 June 1873 |
An Act for confirming certain Provisional Orders made by the Board of Trade under The General Pier and Harbour Act, 1861, (Note: General Pier and Harbour Act 1861 (24 & 25 Vict. c. 45)) relating to Bouldnor, Broadstairs, East Loch Tarbert, Felixstowe, Filey, Fishguard, Fraserburgh, Ilfracombe, Lochaline, Newlyn, and Sandhaven.
| | Bouldnor Pier Order 1873 | |
| | Broadstairs Pier Order 1873 | |
| | East Loch Tarbert Pier Order 1873 | |
| | Felixstowe Pier Order 1873 | |
| | Filey Promenade Pier Order 1873 | |
| | Fishguard Harbour Order 1873 | |
| | Fraserburgh Harbour Order 1873 | |
| | Ilfracombe Harbour Order 1873 | |
| | Lochaline Pier Order 1873 | |
| | Newlyn Pier and Harbour Order 1873 | |
| | Sandhaven Harbour Order 1873 | |
| Swansea Waterworks Act 1873 (repealed) | 36 & 37 Vict. c. lxiv | 16 June 1873 |
An Act for enabling the Mayor, Aldermen, and Burgesses of the borough of Swansea, acting as and for the Urban Sanitary Authority for the district of Swansea under "The Public Health Act, 1872," (Note: Public Health Act 1872 (35 & 36 Vict. c. 79)) to complete and improve certain works authorised by "The Swansea Local Board of Health Waterworks Act, 1860," (Note: Swansea Local Board of Health Waterworks Act 1860 (23 & 24 Vict. c. cxlviii)) and to raise a certain sum of money; and for other purposes. (Repealed by West Glamorgan Water Board Order 1966 (SI 1966/1096))
| Lagan Navigation Act 1873 | 36 & 37 Vict. c. lxv | 16 June 1873 |
An Act to amend and continue the "Lagan Navigation Act;" (Note: Lagan Navigation Act 1814 (54 Geo. 3. c. ccxxxi)) and for other purposes.
| Bristol Harbour Railway Act 1873 | 36 & 37 Vict. c. lxvi | 16 June 1873 |
An Act to authorise the Great Western and Bristol and Exeter Railway Companies to extend the Bristol Harbour Railway, and to make a new Wharf Depôt; and for other purposes.
| Stockton Gas Act 1873 | 36 & 37 Vict. c. lxvii | 16 June 1873 |
An Act to authorise the Stockton Municipal Corporation to raise more money for the purposes of their gas supply, and to amend the Stockton Gas Acts, 1857 (Note: Stockton Gas Act 1857 (20 & 21 Vict. c. lii)) and 1866. (Note: Stockton Gas Act 1866 (29 & 30 Vict. c. cvi))
| South Western Railway (Amalgamation, &c.) Act 1873 | 36 & 37 Vict. c. lxviii | 16 June 1873 |
An Act for authorising or making further provision as to the lease, sale, or transfer of the railways or the amalgamation of the undertakings of other companies to or with the undertaking of the London and South-western Railway Company.
| Over Darwen Local Board Waterworks and Gasworks Act 1873 | 36 & 37 Vict. c. lxix | 16 June 1873 |
An Act to empower the Local Board of Health for the district of Over Darwen, in the county of Lancaster, to acquire the undertakings of the Darwen Waterworks Company and of the Over Darwen Gaslight Company; and for other purposes.
| Llanfyllin and Llangynog Railway Act 1873 (repealed) | 36 & 37 Vict. c. lxx | 16 June 1873 |
An Act for making a railway from Llanfyllin to Llangynog, in the counties of Montgomery and Denbigh, and for other purposes. (Repealed by Statute Law (Repeals) Act 2013 (c. 2))
| South Western Railway Act 1873 | 36 & 37 Vict. c. lxxi | 16 June 1873 |
An Act for authorising the London and South-western Railway Company to make additional railways; and for other purposes.
| North Wales Narrow Gauge Railways (Lease) Act 1873 | 36 & 37 Vict. c. lxxii | 16 June 1873 |
An Act to enable the North Wales Narrow Gauge Railways Company to lease their Moel-Tryfan Undertaking to Hugh Beaver Roberts.
| Bournemouth Gas and Water Act 1873 | 36 & 37 Vict. c. lxxiii | 16 June 1873 |
An Act for re-incorporating and giving additional Powers to the Bournemouth Gas and Water Company; and for other purposes.
| Harrow Gas Act 1873 | 36 & 37 Vict. c. lxxiv | 16 June 1873 |
An Act for incorporating and conferring powers on the Harrow Gaslight and Coke Company (Limited).
| Sutton, Southcoates and Drypool Gas Act 1867 Amendment Act 1873 (repealed) | 36 & 37 Vict. c. lxxv | 16 June 1873 |
An Act to amend the Sutton, Southcoates, and Drypool Gas Act, 1867 (Note: Sutton, Southcoates and Drypool Gas Act 1867 (30 & 31 Vict. c. xii)) (additional lands, power to manufacture and store gas thereon, repeal of provisions of former Act). (Repealed by East Hull Gas Act 1933 (23 & 24 Geo. 5. c. lxxxv))
| Wrexham District Tramways Act 1873 | 36 & 37 Vict. c. lxxvi | 16 June 1873 |
An Act to authorise the construction of the Wrexham District Tramways, and for other purposes.
| Manchester, Sheffield and Lincolnshire Railway Act 1873 | 36 & 37 Vict. c. lxxvii | 16 June 1873 |
An Act for authorising the Manchester, Sheffield, and Lincolnshire Railway Company to make new Branch Railways, for conferring upon them additional powers; and for other purposes.
| North Metropolitan Tramways Act 1873 | 36 & 37 Vict. c. lxxviii | 16 June 1873 |
An Act to extend the time granted by "The North Metropolitan Tramways Act, 1870," (Note: North Metropolitan Tramways Act 1870 (33 & 34 Vict. c. clxxii)) for the construction of works within the city of London.
| Kington and Eardisley Railway Act 1873 | 36 & 37 Vict. c. lxxix | 16 June 1873 |
An Act to authorise the Kington and Eardisley Railway Company to make a Railway from the Leominster and Kington Railway at Kington to New Radnor, and for other purposes.
| Colne Valley Water Act 1873 | 36 & 37 Vict. c. lxxx | 16 June 1873 |
An Act for better supplying with Water certain parishes and districts in the counties of Hertford and Middlesex.
| Gas and Water Orders Confirmation (No. 2) Act 1873 | 36 & 37 Vict. c. lxxxi | 7 July 1873 |
An Act for confirming certain Provisional Orders made by the Board of Trade under The Gas and Water Works Facilities Act, 1870, relating to Fleetwood Gas, Midsomer Norton Gas, Holywell Water, and Monmouth Gas and Water.
| | Fleetwood Gas Order 1873 | |
| | Monmouth Gas and Water Order 1873 | |
| Local Government Board's Provisional Orders Confirmation Act 1873 (No. 2) or the Local Government Board's Provisional Orders Confirmation (No. 2) Act 1873 | 36 & 37 Vict. c. lxxxii | 7 July 1873 |
An Act to confirm certain Provisional Orders of the Local Government Board relating to the Districts of Buxton, Clayton, Crewe, Hitchen, Idle, Leyton, Nottingham (two), Shanklin, Walthamstow, Wellingborough, and Wimbledon.
| | Buxton Order 1873 | |
| | Clayton Order 1873 | |
| | Crewe Order 1873 | |
| | Hitchin Order 1873 | |
| | Idle Order 1873 | |
| | Low Leyton Order 1873 | |
| | Nottingham Order (1) 1873 | |
| | Nottingham Order (2) 1873 | |
| | Shanklin Order 1873 | |
| | Walthamstow Order 1873 | |
| | Wellingborough Order 1873 | |
| | Wimbledon Order 1873 | |
| Local Government Board Provisional Orders Confirmation Act 1873 (No. 3) or the Local Government Board Provisional Orders Confirmation (No. 3) Act 1873 | 36 & 37 Vict. c. lxxxiii | 7 July 1873 |
An Act to confirm two Provisional Orders made by the Local Government Board under "The Poor Law Amendment Act, 1867," (Note: Poor Law Amendment Act 1867 (30 & 31 Vict. c. 106)) with reference to the city of Coventry in the county of Warwick and the parishes of Mid Lavant and East Lavant in the county of Sussex, respectively.
| | Coventry Order 1873 Provisional Order for the repeal of Local Acts. | |
| | West Hampnett Union Order 1873 Provisional Order for the Consolidation of Parishes. | |
| Railways Provisional Certificate Confirmation Act 1873 | 36 & 37 Vict. c. lxxxiv | 7 July 1873 |
An Act to confirm a Provisional Certificate made by the Board of Trade under The Railways Construction Facilities Act, 1864, (Note: Railways Construction Facilities Act 1864 (27 & 28 Vict. c. 121)) and The Railways (Powers and Construction) Acts, 1864, Amendment Act, 1870, (Note: Railways (Powers and Construction) Acts 1864, Amendment Act 1870 (33 & 34 Vict. c. 19)) for the incorporation of the Widnes Railway Company, and for the construction of the Widnes Railway.
| | Widnes Railways Certificate 1873 Provisional Certificate of the Board of Trade for the Construction of the Widnes Railways, and for other purposes connected therewith. | |
| Metropolitan Tramways Orders Confirmation Act 1873 (No. 2) or the Metropolitan Tramways Orders Confirmation (No. 2) Act 1873 | 36 & 37 Vict. c. lxxxv | 7 July 1873 |
An Act for confirming certain Provisional Orders made by the Board of Trade under the Tramways Act, 1870, (Note: Tramways Act 1870 (33 & 34 Vict. c. 78)) for the construction of the Common Road Conveyance Tramway, Kew and Richmond Tramway, Southall, Ealing, and Shepherd's Bush Tramway, and Uxbridge and Southall and Ealing and Brentford Tramway.
| | Common Road Conveyance Company's Tramway Order 1873 Order authorising the construction of a Tramway upon the road from Watford to London. | |
| | Southall Tramway Order 1873 Order authorising the construction of a Tramway on the road from Southall to London, in the county of Middlesex. | |
| | Kew and Richmond Tramway Order 1873 Order authorising the construction of a Tramway from the Northern Side of Kew Bridge to Richmond. | |
| | Uxbridge and Southall and Ealing and Brentford Tramway Order 1873 Order authorising the construction of Tramways on the roads between Uxbridge and Southall, and between Ealing and Brentford, in the county of Middlesex. | |
| Metropolitan Commons Supplemental Act 1873 | 36 & 37 Vict. c. lxxxvi | 7 July 1873 |
An Act to confirm a Scheme under "The Metropolitan Commons Act, 1866," (Note: Metropolitan Commons Act 1866 (29 & 30 Vict. c. 122)) relating to Tooting Beck Common.
| | Scheme for the Establishment of Local Management with respect to Tooting Beck Common. | |
| Navan and Kingscourt Railway Act 1873 | 36 & 37 Vict. c. lxxxvii | 7 July 1873 |
An Act to enable the Navan and Kingscourt Railway Company to make Deviations in their Railways; and for other purposes.
| Railway Clearing System Superannuation Fund Association Act 1873 | 36 & 37 Vict. c. lxxxviii | 7 July 1873 |
An Act for establishing the Railway Clearing System Superannuation Fund Association.
| Belfast Gas Act 1873 | 36 & 37 Vict. c. lxxxix | 7 July 1873 |
An Act for granting further powers to the Belfast Gaslight Company.
| Great Northern Railway (Additional Powers) Act 1873 | 36 & 37 Vict. c. xc | 7 July 1873 |
An Act to grant further Powers to the Great Northern Railway Company with relation to their undertaking; and for other purposes.
| Dublin Tramways Act 1873 | 36 & 37 Vict. c. xci | 7 July 1873 |
An Act to empower the Dublin Tramways Company to construct new tramways; and for other purposes.
| Bootle-cum-Linacre (Borough Boundary) Act 1873 | 36 & 37 Vict. c. xcii | 7 July 1873 |
An Act for declaring the boundary of the Borough of Bootle-cum-Linacre, in the County of Lancaster, and for other purposes.
| Birmingham Tramways Act 1873 | 36 & 37 Vict. c. xciii | 7 July 1873 |
An Act to extend the time for completion of Tramways authorised by "The Birmingham Tramways Act, 1870," (Note: Birmingham Tramways Act 1870 (33 & 34 Vict. c. clxxvii)) to be constructed; and for other purposes.
| Atherton Local Board Act 1873 | 36 & 37 Vict. c. xciv | 7 July 1873 |
An Act for empowering the Local Board for the District of Atherton in the parish of Leigh in the county of Lancaster to make and supply Gas; and for confirming an Agreement between them and the Atherton Gas Company, Limited, for the purchase of that Company's undertaking; and for other purposes.
| Hove Commissioners Act 1873 | 36 & 37 Vict. c. xcv | 7 July 1873 |
An Act for the Local Government of the parish of Hove in the county of Sussex; and for other purposes.
| Birmingham West Suburban Railway Act 1873 | 36 & 37 Vict. c. xcvi | 7 July 1873 |
An Act for amending and extending the Birmingham West Suburban Railway Act, 1871; (Note: Birmingham West Suburban Railway Act 1871 (34 & 35 Vict. c. clxxv)) and for other purposes.
| Albert Bridge Act 1873 (repealed) | 36 & 37 Vict. c. xcvii | 7 July 1873 |
An Act to extend the time limited for the completion of the Bridge and other works authorised by "The Albert Bridge Act, 1864," (Note: Albert Bridge Act 1864 (27 & 28 Vict. c. ccxxxv)) "The Albert Bridge Act, 1869," (Note: Albert Bridge Act 1869 (32 & 33 Vict. c. xliv)) and "The Albert Bridge Act, 1871," (Note: Albert Bridge Act 1871 (34 & 35 Vict. c. lxxiii)) and to continue and enlarge the powers of such Acts; and for other purposes (Repealed by Local Law (Greater London Council and Inner London Boroughs) Order 1965 (SI 1965/540))
| Birmingham and Staffordshire Tramways Act 1873 | 36 & 37 Vict. c. xcviii | 7 July 1873 |
An Act for granting further powers to the Birmingham and Staffordshire Tramways Company.
| Bank of Scotland Act 1873 (repealed) | 36 & 37 Vict. c. xcix | 7 July 1873 |
An Act to authorise the increase of the Capital Stock of the Bank of Scotland; and for other purposes. (Repealed by HBOS Group Reorganisation Act 2006 (c. i))
| Charing Cross and Victoria Embankment Approach Act 1873 (repealed) | 36 & 37 Vict. c. c | 7 July 1873 |
An Act for making a new Street from Charing Cross to the Victoria Embankment. (Repealed by Local Law (Greater London Council and Inner London Boroughs) Order 1965 (SI 1965/540))
| Girvan and Portpatrick Junction Railway Act 1873 | 36 & 37 Vict. c. ci | 7 July 1873 |
An Act to extend for a further period the time for the compulsory purchase of lands and for the completion of the Railway authorised by "The Girvan and Portpatrick Junction Railway Act, 1865;" (Note: Girvan and Portpatrick Junction Railway Act 1865 (28 & 29 Vict. c. ccclviii)) and for other purposes.
| Sheffield Town Trustees Act 1873 | 36 & 37 Vict. c. cii | 7 July 1873 |
An Act to provide for the more effectual Application of the Surplus Annual Income of the Sheffield Town Trustees, and the Investment of their Trust Funds; and for other purposes.
| Ennis and West Clare Railway Act 1873 | 36 & 37 Vict. c. ciii | 7 July 1873 |
An Act to authorise the Ennis and West Clare Railway Company to extend their Railway; to raise further Capital; and for other purposes.
| Newport Railway Act 1873 | 36 & 37 Vict. c. civ | 7 July 1873 |
An Act for extending the time for the completion of the Newport Railway; and for confirming an Agreement for the working and use of the same by the North British Railway Company; and for other purposes.
| Great Ormes Head Marine Drive Act 1873 | 36 & 37 Vict. c. cv | 7 July 1873 |
An Act for making a Marine Road or Drive round the Great Ormes Head in the parish of Llandudno in the county of Caernarvon; and for other purposes.
| Borough of Portsmouth Waterworks Act 1873 (repealed) | 36 & 37 Vict. c. cvi | 7 July 1873 |
An Act for amending the provisions of the Borough of Portsmouth Waterworks Act, 1857, (Note: Borough of Portsmouth Waterworks Act 1857 (20 & 21 Vict. c. xlv)) relative to constant supply of Water under pressure; and for other purposes. (Repealed by Portsmouth Water Order 1964 (SI 1964/790))
| Great North of Scotland Railway Act 1873 | 36 & 37 Vict. c. cvii | 7 July 1873 |
An Act to enable the Great North of Scotland Railway Company to convert certain Arrears of Dividend into Capital; and for other purposes.
| Thetford and Watton Railway Act 1873 | 36 & 37 Vict. c. cviii | 7 July 1873 |
An Act to enable the Thetford and Watton Railway Company to extend their Railway to join the Bury Saint Edmunds and Thetford Railway; and for other purposes.
| Wolverhampton, Walsall, and Midland Junction Railway Company's Act 1873 or the Wolverhampton, Walsall and Midland Junction Railway Act 1873 | 36 & 37 Vict. c. cix | 7 July 1873 |
An Act to enable the Wolverhampton, Walsall, and Midland Junction Railway Company to make an additional Junction with the Midland Railway near Water Orton; and for other purposes relating to that Company.
| Barrow-in-Furness Corporation Act 1873 | 36 & 37 Vict. c. cx | 7 July 1873 |
An Act for empowering the Mayor, Aldermen, and Burgesses of the Borough of Barrow-in-Furness to make additional Waterworks and Gasworks and new Streets; and for conferring additional powers upon them with reference to the raising of Money and the Improvement of the Borough; and for other purposes.
| Devon and Cornwall Railway (Extensions to Plymouth and Devonport) Act 1873 | 36 & 37 Vict. c. cxi | 7 July 1873 |
An Act for conferring further Powers upon the Devon and Cornwall Railway Company for the Construction of Works and the raising of Money, and otherwise in relation to their Undertaking and the Undertakings of other Companies; and for other purposes.
| Devon and Cornwall Railway (Western Extensions) Act 1873 | 36 & 37 Vict. c. cxii | 7 July 1873 |
An Act for authorising the Devon and Cornwall Railway Company to make Extensions of their Railway to Holsworthy, and to Camelford, and to the Launceston and South Devon Railway; and to raise further Moneys; and for authorising Arrangements between them and other Railway Companies; and for other purposes.
| Great Western, Bristol and Exeter, and South Devon Railways (Cornwall and West Cornwall Railways) Act 1873 | 36 & 37 Vict. c. cxiii | 7 July 1873 |
An Act to enable the Great Western Railway Company, the Bristol and Exeter Railway Company, and the South Devon Railway Company to make a Branch Railway to Saint Ives; and for other purposes.
| South Devon Railway Act 1873 | 36 & 37 Vict. c. cxiv | 7 July 1873 |
An Act to enable the South Devon Railway Company to acquire Lands and execute Works in connexion with their Undertaking; and for other purposes.
| Clyde Navigation Act 1873 | 36 & 37 Vict. c. cxv | 7 July 1873 |
An Act to authorise the Trustees of the Clyde Navigation to construct a Graving Dock, Quays or Wharfs, and other Works at and in connexion with the Harbour of Glasgow and the River Clyde; to abandon authorised Works; to borrow Money; and for other purposes.
| Gaslight and Coke Company's Act 1873 | 36 & 37 Vict. c. cxvi | 7 July 1873 |
An Act to confer additional powers on the Gaslight and Coke Company, and to amend the Gaslight and Coke Company's Act, 1868, (Note: Gaslight and Coke Company's Act 1868 (31 & 32 Vict. c. cvi)) and the several Acts altering and amending the same; and for other purposes.
| Newcastle-upon-Tyne and Gateshead Gas Act 1873 | 36 & 37 Vict. c. cxvii | 7 July 1873 |
An Act for granting further powers to the Newcastle-upon-Tyne and Gateshead Gas Company.
| Joint Portsmouth Railway Extension Act 1873 | 36 & 37 Vict. c. cxviii | 7 July 1873 |
An Act to authorise the London and South-western Railway Company and the London, Brighton, and South Coast Railway Company to extend their Joint Line at Portsmouth, and for other purposes connected with the said Extension.
| Waterford and Central Ireland Railway Act 1873 | 36 & 37 Vict. c. cxix | 7 July 1873 |
An Act to authorise deviations from the authorised Lines of the Central Ireland Railways, and to confer further powers with reference to those Lines and their respective Undertakings of the Waterford and Central Ireland Railway Company and the Kilkenny Junction Railway Company; and for other purposes.
| Lincoln Gaslight and Coke Company's Act 1873 | 36 & 37 Vict. c. cxx | 7 July 1873 |
An Act to enable the Lincoln Gaslight and Coke Company to execute new Works; to extend their Limits of Supply; to enable them to raise more Money; and for other purposes.
| Whitby, Redcar, and Middlesborough Union Railway Act 1873 | 36 & 37 Vict. c. cxxi | 7 July 1873 |
An Act to authorise the diversion and alteration of the Line and Levels of the Whitby, Redcar, and Middlesborough Union Railway; and for other purposes.
| Briton Ferry Local Board Act 1873 | 36 & 37 Vict. c. cxxii | 7 July 1873 |
An Act to enable the Briton Ferry Local Board to acquire the Undertaking of the Briton Ferry Gas and Coke Company.
| Brighton and Hove Gas Act 1873 | 36 & 37 Vict. c. cxxiii | 7 July 1873 |
An Act to make better provision for the Recovery by the Brighton and Hove General Gas Company of Gas Rents and Rates, to alter existing Rents and Rates; and for other purposes.
| Irvine Harbour Act 1873 | 36 & 37 Vict. c. cxxiv | 7 July 1873 |
An Act to consolidate the Irvine Harbour Orders, 1867 and 1870, and to authorise the construction of new Works at the Harbour; and for other purposes.
| Brighton Borough Extension Act 1873 (repealed) | 36 & 37 Vict. c. cxxv | 7 July 1873 |
An Act to extend the Borough of Brighton to part of the Parish of Preston; and for other purposes. (Repealed by Brighton Corporation Act 1931 (21 & 22 Geo. 5. c. cix))
| Durham Gas Act 1873 | 36 & 37 Vict. c. cxxvi | 7 July 1873 |
An Act for incorporating and conferring powers on the City of Durham Gas Company.
| West Lancashire Railway Act 1873 (repealed) | 36 & 37 Vict. c. cxxvii | 7 July 1873 |
An Act for authorising the West Lancashire Railway Company to raise further Capital. (Repealed by West Lancashire Railway Act 1875 (38 & 39 Vict. c. clxxxii))
| Staines and West Drayton Railway Act 1873 | 36 & 37 Vict. c. cxxviii | 7 July 1873 |
An Act for making a Railway from the London and South-western Railway at Staines to the Great Western Railway at West Drayton; and for other purposes.
| Doncaster Corporation Waterworks Act 1873 | 36 & 37 Vict. c. cxxix | 7 July 1873 |
An Act for enabling the Mayor, Aldermen, and Burgesses of the borough of Doncaster to execute Works for the Improvement of the Water Supply of that borough and of the neighbourhood thereof; and for other purposes.
| Dublin and Drogheda Railway Act 1873 | 36 & 37 Vict. c. cxxx | 7 July 1873 |
An Act for enabling the Dublin and Drogheda Railway Company to acquire additional Lands, and to widen Bridges; and for other purposes.
| Hammersmith Extension Railway Act 1873 | 36 & 37 Vict. c. cxxxi | 7 July 1873 |
An Act to authorise the construction of a Railway in extension of the Metropolitan District Railway to Hammersmith.
| Waterford, Dungarvan, and Lismore Railway Act 1873 | 36 & 37 Vict. c. cxxxii | 7 July 1873 |
An Act to amend "The Waterford, Dungarvan, and Lismore Railway Act, 1872," (Note: Waterford, Dungarvan, and Lismore Railway Act 1872 (35 & 36 Vict. c. cvi)) and to enable the Waterford Dungarvan and Lismore Railway Company to make deviations from their authorised Railway, and to abandon a portion of the authorised Railway; to extend the time for the execution of works; to afford facilities to the Company for raising the funds necessary to execute their Undertaking; and for other purposes.
| Columbia Market Act 1873 | 36 & 37 Vict. c. cxxxiii | 7 July 1873 |
An Act for confirming the Gift of Columbia Market by the Baroness Burdett Coutts to the Mayor and Commonalty and Citizens of the city of London, and for making further provision respecting the maintenance and use of the Market, and for the construction of Tramways in connexion therewith; and for other purposes.
| Trowbridge Water Act 1873 | 36 & 37 Vict. c. cxxxiv | 7 July 1873 |
An Act to dissolve the Trowbridge and District New Water Company, Limited, and to re-incorporate the Members thereof and others, for supplying with Water the town and parish of Trowbridge and other places in the county of Wilts; and for other purposes.
| Cleveland Extension Mineral Railway Act 1873 | 36 & 37 Vict. c. cxxxv | 7 July 1873 |
An Act for making certain Railways in the North Riding of the county of York; and for other purposes.
| Freshwater, Yarmouth, and Newport Railway Act 1873 (repealed) | 36 & 37 Vict. c. cxxxvi | 7 July 1873 |
An Act for the making of Railways from Freshwater to Yarmouth and Newport, in the Isle of Wight; and for other purposes. (Repealed by Freshwater, Yarmouth, and Newport Railway (Abandonment) Act 1877 (40 & 41 Vict. c. cv))
| Education Department Provisional Order Confirmation Act (No. 4) 1873 or the Education Department Provisional Order Confirmation (No. 4) Act 1873 | 36 & 37 Vict. c. cxxxvii | 21 July 1873 |
An Act to confirm a Provisional Order made by the Education Department under "The Elementary Education Act, 1870," to enable the School Board for the parish of Llanrwst to put in force "The Lands Clauses Consolidation Act, 1845," and the Acts amending the same.
| | Llanrwst Order 1873 Provisional Order for putting in force the Lands Clauses Consolidation Act, 1845. | |
| Education Department Provisional Order Confirmation Act (No. 5) 1873 or the Education Department Provisional Order Confirmation (No. 5) Act 1873 | 36 & 37 Vict. c. cxxxviii | 21 July 1873 |
An Act to confirm a Provisional Order made by the Education Department under "The Elementary Education Act, 1870," to enable the School Board for the parish of Llanelly, Carmarthen to put in force "The Lands Clauses Consolidation Act, 1845," and the Acts amending the same.
| | Llanelly Order 1873 Provisional Order for putting in force the Lands Clauses Consolidation Act, 1845. | |
| Education Department Provisional Order Confirmation Act (No. 6) 1873 or the Education Department Provisional Order Confirmation (No. 6) Act 1873 (repealed) | 36 & 37 Vict. c. cxxxix | 21 July 1873 |
An Act to confirm a Provisional Order made by the Education Department under "The Elementary Education Act, 1870," to enable the School Board for the parish of Merthyr Tydfil to put in force "The Lands Clauses Consolidation Act, 1845," and the Acts amending the same. (Repealed by Mid Glamorgan County Council Act 1987 (c. vii))
| | Merthyr Tydfil Order 1873 Provisional Order for putting in force the Lands Clauses Consolidation Act, 1845. | |
| Local Government Board's Provisional Orders Confirmation Act 1873 (No. 4) or the Local Government Board's Provisional Orders Confirmation (No. 4) Act 1873 | 36 & 37 Vict. c. cxl | 21 July 1873 |
An Act to confirm certain Provisional Orders of the Local Government Board relating to the Districts of Buxton, Carnarvon, Ealing, Pontypridd, Ravensthorpe, Reading (two), Shipley Teignmouth, Wheathampstead, Wisbech and Walsoken (two).
| | Buxton Order 1873 Provisional Order to extend the Local Government District of Buxton. | |
| | Carnarvon Order 1873 Provisional Order for extending the Borrowing Powers of the Urban Sanitary Authority of the Borough of Carnarvon. | |
| | Ealing Order 1873 Provisional Order for extending the Local Government District of Ealing, and for increasing the number of Members of the Local Board. | |
| | Ponytpridd Order 1873 Provisional Order for constituting the Pontypridd Urban Sanitary District. | |
| | Ravensthorpe Order 1873 rovisional Order to enable the Local Board of Ravensthorpe to put in force the Compulsory Clauses of the Lands Clauses Consolidation Act, 1845. | |
| | Reading Order (1) 1873 Provisional Order extending the Borrowing Powers of the Sanitary Authority of the Urban Sanitary District of Reading. | |
| | Reading Order (2) 1873 Provisional Order for altering two Local Acts. (Note: Reading Local Board Waterworks Act 1868 (31 & 32 Vict. c. lxxxi)) (Note: Reading Local Board Waterworks, Sewerage, Drainage, and Improvement Act 1870 (33 & 34 Vict. c. cxxxiii)) | |
| | Shipley Order 1873 Provisional Order for alteration of Local Act. (Note: Shipley Waterworks and Police Act 1854 (17 & 18 Vict. c. lxxvii)) | |
| | Teignmouth Order 1873 Provisional Order to enable the Local Board of Teignmouth to put in force the Compulsory Clauses of the Lands Clauses Consolidation Act, 1845. | |
| | Wheathampstead Order 1873 Provisional Order for enabling the Sanitary Authority for the Rural Sanitary District of the Saint Albans Union to put in force the Compulsory Clauses of the Lands Clauses Consolidation Act, 1845. | |
| | Wisbech and Walsoken Order (1) 1873 Provisional Order for investing the Local Board of Health for the Main Sewerage District of Wisbech and Walsoken with powers under the Public Health Act, 1872, (Note: Public Health Act 1872 (35 & 36 Vict. c. 79)) for purposes of Main Sewerage. | |
| | Wisbech and Walsoken Order (2) 1873 Provisional Order to enable the Local Board of Health for the Main Sewerage District of Wisbech and Walsoken to put in force the Compulsory Clauses of the Lands Clauses Consolidation Act, 1845. | |
| Local Government Board's Provisional Orders Confirmation Act 1873 (No. 5) or the Local Government Board's Provisional Orders Confirmation (No. 5) Act 1873 | 36 & 37 Vict. c. cxli | 21 July 1873 |
An Act to confirm certain Provisional Orders of the Local Government Board relating to the Districts of Baldersby, Bristol, Buxton, Dawlish, Nelson, and Wellington in the county of Somerset.
| | Baldersby Order 1873 Provisional Order dissolving the Local Government District of Baldersby, in the County of York. | |
| | Bristol Order 1873 Provisional Order to enable the Sanitary Authority for the Urban Sanitary District of the City and County of Bristol to put in force the Compulsory Clauses of the Lands Clauses Consolidation Act, 1845. | |
| | Buxton Order 1873 Provisional Order to enable the Local Board of Buxton to put in force the Compulsory Clauses of the Lands Clauses Consolidation Act, 1845. | |
| | Dawlish Order 1873 Provisional Order enabling the Local Board for the District of Dawlish to purchase certain lands under the Lands Clauses Consolidation Act, 1845. | |
| | Nelson Order 1873 Provisional Order for the Alteration of a Local Act. (Note: Nelson Water and Gas Act 1866 (29 & 30 Vict. c. lxxvi)) | |
| | Wellington Order 1873 Provisional Order declaring the Parish of Wellington, in the County of Somerset, to be an Urban Sanitary District. | |
| Uxbridge Gas Act 1873 | 36 & 37 Vict. c. cxlii | 21 July 1873 |
An Act to extend the powers of the Uxbridge and Hillingdon Gas Consumers Company; and for other purposes.
| Mersey Dock (Liverpool Dock Extension) Act 1873 | 36 & 37 Vict. c. cxliii | 21 July 1873 |
An Act to authorise the Mersey Docks and Harbour Board to construct new Docks and other Works on the Liverpool side of the River Mersey, and to borrow further moneys for that purpose.
| Mersey Dock (South Reserve Landing Stage) Act 1873 (repealed) | 36 & 37 Vict. c. cxliv | 21 July 1873 |
An Act to authorise the Mersey Docks and Harbour Board to construct a new Landing Stage opposite the South Reserve at Birkenhead, and confirm an Agreement with reference thereto between the said Board and the London and North-western and Great Western Railway Companies; and for other purposes. (Repealed by Mersey Docks and Harbour Board (Ore Berth) Act 1971 (c. xxxiv))
| Solway Junction Railway Act 1873 | 36 & 37 Vict. c. cxlv | 21 July 1873 |
An Act for enabling the Solway Junction Railway Company to dispose of the Purchase Money for part of their Undertaking; and for other purposes.
| London Central Railway Act 1873 (repealed) | 36 & 37 Vict. c. cxlvi | 21 July 1873 |
An Act for conferring further powers upon the London Central Railway Company for the purchase of Lands. (Repealed by London Central Railway (Abandonment) Act 1875 (38 & 39 Vict. c. cxiv))
| Cardiff and Ogmore Valley Railway Act 1873 | 36 & 37 Vict. c. cxlvii | 21 July 1873 |
An Act for making a Railway from the Llynvi and Ogmore Railway near Blackmill to the Great Western Railway at Llanharan, to be called the Cardiff and Ogmore Valley Railway; and for other purposes.
| Glasgow Corporation Gas Act 1873 (repealed) | 36 & 37 Vict. c. cxlviii | 21 July 1873 |
An Act for the Conversion into Consolidated Stock of Annuities issued under the Glasgow Corporation Gas Act, 1869; (Note: Glasgow Corporation Gas Act 1869 (32 & 33 Vict. c. lviii)) and for other purposes. (Repealed by Glasgow Gas Act 1910 (10 Edw. 7 & 1 Geo. 5. c. cxxxi))
| London and Aylesbury Railway Act 1873 | 36 & 37 Vict. c. cxlix | 21 July 1873 |
An Act for authorising the London and Aylesbury Railway Company to raise further Capital.
| South Staffordshire Mines Drainage Act 1873 | 36 & 37 Vict. c. cl | 21 July 1873 |
An Act to facilitate the Drainage of Mines in parts of South Staffordshire and East Worcestershire.
| Alexandra (Newport) Dock Act 1873 | 36 & 37 Vict. c. cli | 21 July 1873 |
An Act for amending the Acts relating to the Undertaking of the Alexandra (Newport) Dock Company; and for other purposes.
| Gosport Gas Act 1873 | 36 & 37 Vict. c. clii | 21 July 1873 |
An Act to amend "The Gosport Gas Act, 1865," (Note: Gosport Gas Act 1865 (28 & 29 Vict. c. lxiv)) with respect to the price of Gas.
| Cheshire Lines Act 1873 | 36 & 37 Vict. c. cliii | 21 July 1873 |
An Act for conferring further powers on the Cheshire Lines Committee; and for other purposes.
| Dudley and Oldbury Junction Railway Act 1873 | 36 & 37 Vict. c. cliv | 21 July 1873 |
An Act for incorporating the Dudley and Oldbury Junction Railway Company, and authorising them to make and maintain Railways from Oldbury, in the county of Worcester, communicating with the South Staffordshire and Stour Valley Branches of the Railways of the London and North-western Railway Company; and for other purposes.
| Llantrissant and Taff Vale Junction Railway Act 1873 | 36 & 37 Vict. c. clv | 21 July 1873 |
An Act to enable the Llantrissant and Taff Vale Junction Railway Company to effect a Junction between their Rail way and the Ely Valley Railway; to extend the time for the completion of a portion of their authorised Railways; and for other purposes.
| London and North-western Railway (New Lines, &c.) Act 1873 | 36 & 37 Vict. c. clvi | 21 July 1873 |
An Act for enabling the London and North-western Railway Company to construct new Railways, to widen portions of their existing Railways, to enlarge their Lime Street Station at Liverpool; and for other purposes.
| Peterhead Harbours Act 1873 (repealed) | 36 & 37 Vict. c. clvii | 21 July 1873 |
An Act to amend the constitution of the Harbour Trust of Peterhead, to authorise the construction of new Works at the Harbours, and to provide for the further improvement and maintenance of the same; and for other purposes. (Repealed by Peterhead Harbours Order Confirmation Act 1992 (c. xii))
| Taff Vale Railway Act 1873 | 36 & 37 Vict. c. clviii | 21 July 1873 |
An Act to empower the Taff Vale Railway Company to make new Railways and acquire additional Lands in the county of Glamorgan, and to run over and use a portion of the Railway of the Great Western Railway Company; and for other purposes.
| Dewsbury and Batley Corporations (Gas) Act 1873 | 36 & 37 Vict. c. clix | 21 July 1873 |
An Act to authorise the Corporations of Dewsbury and Batley in the West Riding of the county of York to construct Gasworks, and to purchase the Undertaking of the Dewsbury and Batley Gas Company; and for other purposes.
| Dunfermline and Queensferry Railway Act 1873 | 36 & 37 Vict. c. clx | 21 July 1873 |
An Act for making a Railway from Dunfermline to North Queensferry in the county of Fife, and Pier in connexion therewith; and for other purposes.
| South-western Railway (General) Act 1873 | 36 & 37 Vict. c. clxi | 21 July 1873 |
An Act for authorising the London and South-western Railway Company to make and maintain new Railways in the parish of St. Mary, Battersea, to execute other works; to purchase additional Lands; and to raise further moneys; and for other purposes.
| Cornwall Minerals Railway Act 1873 | 36 & 37 Vict. c. clxii | 21 July 1873 |
An Act to authorise the construction of Railways in the county of Cornwall, to be called the Cornwall Mineral Railways, and the amalgamation therewith of the New Quay and Cornwall Junction Railway, and other undertakings connected therewith.
| London and Blackwall Railway Act 1873 | 36 & 37 Vict. c. clxiii | 21 July 1873 |
An Act to enable the London and Blackwall Railway Company to enlarge their Stepney Station; to construct a Landing Pier in the Thames in connexion with their Millwall Extension Railway; to authorise arrangements with the Great Eastern Railway Company; and for other purposes.
| Dumbarton Corporation Gasworks, Pier, &c. Act 1873 | 36 & 37 Vict. c. clxiv | 21 July 1873 |
An Act to authorise the Provost, Magistrates, and Town Council of the Burgh of Dumbarton to supply the Burgh and adjacent district with Gas; to erect a Pier in the River Clyde, and road of approach thereto; and for other purposes.
| Halesowen and Bromsgrove Branch Railways Act 1873 | 36 & 37 Vict. c. clxv | 21 July 1873 |
An Act to authorise the Halesowen and Bromsgrove Branch Railways Company to construct deviations of their authorised Railways; and for other purposes.
| Wandsworth Bridge Act 1873 (repealed) | 36 & 37 Vict. c. clxvi | 21 July 1873 |
An Act to extend the time for the completion of the Wandsworth Bridge and approaches; and for other purposes. (Repealed by Local Law (Greater London Council and Inner London Boroughs) Order 1965 (SI 1965/540))
| Bradford Improvement Act 1873 | 36 & 37 Vict. c. clxvii | 21 July 1873 |
An Act to authorise the Mayor, Aldermen, and Burgesses of the borough of Bradford, in the West Riding of the county of York, to construct additional Waterworks, to effect Street Improvements, to enlarge the borough for Municipal, Sanitary, and other like purposes, to extend the limits of Water Supply of the Corporation; and for other purposes.
| Bristol and North Somerset Railway Act 1873 | 36 & 37 Vict. c. clxviii | 21 July 1873 |
An Act to confer upon the Bristol and North Somerset Railway Company renewed powers for making a Branch Railway to Camerton, and power to divert the road leading from Pensford to Stanton Wick, and to confer certain powers on the Great Western Railway Company with respect to the said Branch Railway; and for other purposes.
| Belgrave Market (Extension of Time) Act 1873 (repealed) | 36 & 37 Vict. c. clxix | 21 July 1873 |
An Act to extend the time for the purchase of Lands and for the completion of the Belgrave Market; and for other purposes. (Repealed by Statute Law (Repeals) Act 2008 (c. 12))
| Moulton, &c. Salt Marshes Act 1873 | 36 & 37 Vict. c. clxx | 21 July 1873 |
An Act for the reclamation of open Salt Marshes in the parish of Moulton and elsewhere in Lincolnshire.
| South Leith Parish and Church Act 1873 | 36 & 37 Vict. c. clxxi | 21 July 1873 |
An Act to provide for the discontinuance of the appointment of a Minister to the second charge of the church and parish of South Leith, in the county of Edinburgh; and for other purposes relating to the said church and parish.
| Banbury and Cheltenham Direct Railway Act 1873 | 36 & 37 Vict. c. clxxii | 21 July 1873 |
An Act to incorporate a Company for the construction or the Banbury and Cheltenham Direct Railway; and for other purposes.
| Carlisle Improvement Act 1873 | 36 & 37 Vict. c. clxxiii | 21 July 1873 |
An Act to empower the Corporation of Carlisle to make and maintain a new street, to alter, divert, and stop up existing streets and roads, to alter, enlarge, improve, and regulate the markets, to borrow money; and for other purposes.
| Dundalk, Newry, and Greenore Railway Act 1873 | 36 & 37 Vict. c. clxxiv | 21 July 1873 |
An Act to change the name of the Dundalk and Greenore Railway Company, and to enable them to make a railway from Newry to Greenore, and to acquire the undertaking of the Newry and Greenore Railway Company; and for other purposes.
| Kelvin Valley Railway Act 1873 | 36 & 37 Vict. c. clxxv | 21 July 1873 |
An Act for making a Railway from the Glasgow, Dumbarton, and Helensburgh Railway to Kilsyth, and a Railway therefrom to the Campsie Branch of the North British Railway Company; and for other purposes.
| Leeds, Castleford, and Pontefract Junction Railway Act 1873 | 36 & 37 Vict. c. clxxvi | 21 July 1873 |
An Act to incorporate a Company for making the Leeds, Castleford, and Pontefract Junction Railway; and for other purposes.
| Llynvi and Ogmore Railway Act 1873 | 36 & 37 Vict. c. clxxvii | 21 July 1873 |
An Act for authorising the Llynvi and Ogmore Railway Company to make new Railways; to deviate portions of existing Railways; to raise additional Capital; to authorise arrangements with the Great Western Railway Company; and for other purposes.
| Waterford and Limerick Railway Act 1873 | 36 & 37 Vict. c. clxxviii | 21 July 1873 |
An Act to confer further powers on the Waterford and Limerick Railway Company in relation to their own Undertaking and the Undertakings of other Companies; and for other purposes.
| Lancashire and Yorkshire Railway (New Works and Additional Powers) Act 1873 | 36 & 37 Vict. c. clxxix | 21 July 1873 |
An Act for conferring further powers on the Lancashire and Yorkshire Railway Company; and for other purposes relating to that Company and to the Preston and Wyre Railway.
| Metropolitan District Railway Act 1873 | 36 & 37 Vict. c. clxxx | 21 July 1873 |
An Act for conferring additional powers on the Metropolitan District Railway Company; and for other purposes relating to that Company.
| Metropolitan Railway Act 1873 | 36 & 37 Vict. c. clxxxi | 21 July 1873 |
An Act to grant further powers to the Metropolitan Railway Company.
| Pagham Harbour Reclamation Act 1873 | 36 & 37 Vict. c. clxxxii | 21 July 1873 |
An Act to authorise the construction of Works and Reclamation of Lands in Pagham Harbour in the county of Sussex; and for other purposes.
| Much Wenlock and Severn Junction Railway (Lightmoor Extensions) Act 1873 | 36 & 37 Vict. c. clxxxiii | 21 July 1873 |
An Act for conferring powers upon the Much Wenlock and Severn Junction Railway Company for the construction of Works and the raising of money, and otherwise in relation to their own Undertaking and the Undertakings of other Companies; and for other purposes.
| Upwell, Outwell, and Wisbech Railway Act 1873 (repealed) | 36 & 37 Vict. c. clxxxiv | 21 July 1873 |
An Act for making a Railway from the town of Wisbech in the county of Cambridge to Upwell in the county of Norfolk; and for other purposes. (Repealed by Upwell, Outwell and Wisbech Railway (Abandonment) Act 1884 (47 & 48 Vict. c. xxxi))
| Caledonian Railway (Additional Powers) Act 1873 | 36 & 37 Vict. c. clxxxv | 21 July 1873 |
An Act for enabling the Caledonian Railway Company to make certain Branch Railways and other Works, and to acquire certain Lands, in the counties of Lanark, Forfar, Renfrew, Stirling, and Perth; and for other purposes.
| Caledonian Railway (Wilsontown and West Calder Junction) Act 1873 | 36 & 37 Vict. c. clxxxvi | 21 July 1873 |
An Act for enabling the Caledonian Railway Company to make Branch Railways connecting their Wilsontown Branch with their Cleland and Midcalder Line; and for other purposes.
| Carlisle Citadel Station Act 1873 | 36 & 37 Vict. c. clxxxvii | 21 July 1873 |
An Act for enlarging the extent and improving the accommodation of the Citadel Station at Carlisle, and making and maintaining new Connecting Lines between the various Railways converging there; and for other purposes.
| Caledonian Railway (Gordon Street, Glasgow Station) Act 1873 | 36 & 37 Vict. c. clxxxviii | 21 July 1873 |
An Act for enabling the Caledonian Railway Company to make a Station at Gordon Street, Glasgow, (Note: Glasgow Central railway station.) and Connecting Lines between the same and their Railways on the south side of that city; and for other purposes.
| City of Glasgow Union Railway Act 1873 | 36 & 37 Vict. c. clxxxix | 21 July 1873 |
An Act to confer further powers on the City of Glasgow Union Railway Company, the Glasgow and South-western Railway Company, and the North British Railway Company; and for other purposes.
| Great Western Railway Act 1873 | 36 & 37 Vict. c. cxc | 21 July 1873 |
An Act for conferring further powers on the Great Western Railway Company in relation to their own Undertaking and the Undertakings of other Companies; and for other purposes.
| London and Blackwall Railway (Steamboats) Act 1873 | 36 & 37 Vict. c. cxci | 21 July 1873 |
An Act to authorise the London and Blackwall Railway Company to provide and to use Steam Vessels between Millwall and Greenwich; to authorise arrangements with the owners and lessees of Potter's Ferry and the Great Eastern Railway Company; and for other purposes.
| Severn Bridge and Forest of Dean Central Railway Act 1873 (repealed) | 36 & 37 Vict. c. cxcii | 21 July 1873 |
An Act for making a Railway in Gloucestershire, to be called the Severn Bridge and Forest of Dean Central Railway; and for other purposes. (Repealed by Severn Bridge and Forest of Dean Central Railway (Abandonment) Act 1884 (47 & 48 Vict. c. xxxiv))
| Swansea and Carmarthen and London and North-western Railway Act 1873 | 36 & 37 Vict. c. cxciii | 21 July 1873 |
An Act for the transfer of the Swansea Lines Undertaking of the Swansea and Carmarthen Railways Company to the London and North-western Railway Company; and for authorising that Company to raise Moneys; and for other purposes.
| Swindon, Marlborough, and Andover Railway Act 1873 | 36 & 37 Vict. c. cxciv | 21 July 1873 |
An Act for making a Railway from the Great Western Railway at Swindon to the London and South-western Railway at Andover; and for other purposes.
| Dun Drainage Act 1873 | 36 & 37 Vict. c. cxcv | 21 July 1873 |
An Act for making better provision for the drainage of Lands on the North and South Sides of the River Don in the West Riding of the county of York; and for other purposes.
| Clare Slob Land Reclamation Act 1873 or the Clare Slobland Reclamation Act 1873 | 36 & 37 Vict. c. cxcvi | 21 July 1873 |
An Act for embanking and reclaiming certain waste Land in the county of Clare.
| Tramways Orders Confirmation Act 1873 | 36 & 37 Vict. c. cxcvii | 28 July 1873 |
An Act for confirming certain Provisional Orders made by the Board of Trade under the Tramways Act, 1870, relating to Cardiff, Dewsbury, Batley, and Birstal, Felixstowe and Fagborough Cliff, Ipswich and Felixstowe, Leicester, Middlesbrough and Stockton, Neath and District, and Newport (Monmouthshire).
| | Cardiff Tramway Order 1873 Order authorising the Cardiff Tramways Company, Limited, to construct additional Tramways in the Parishes of St. Mary, Cardiff, and St. John, Cardiff, in the County of Glamorgan. | |
| | Dewsbury, Batley and Birstal Tramways Order 1873 Order authorising the Construction of Tramways in the Parishes of Dewsbury, Batley, and Birstal, in the West Riding of the County of York. | |
| | Felixstowe and Fagborough Cliff (Walton) Tramway Order 1873 Order authorising the Construction of a Tramway in the Parishes of Felixstowe, Walton, and Trimley Saint Mary, all in the County of Suffolk. | |
| | Ipswich and Felixstowe Tramways Order 1873 Order authorising the Construction of Tramways from the Ipswich Station of the Great Eastern Railway in the Borough of Ipswich to Felixstowe in the County of Suffolk. | |
| | Leicester Tramways Order 1873 Order authorising the Construction of Tramways in and near Leicester. | |
| | Middlesbrough and Stockton Tramways Order 1873 Order authorising the Construction of Tramways from Middlesbrough to Stockton-on-Tees. | |
| | Neath and District Tramways Order 1873 Order authorising the Construction of Tramways in the Town of Neath and its Neighbourhood, in the County of Glamorgan. | |
| | Newport (Monmouthshire) Tramways Order 1873 Order authorising the Construction of Tramways in the Borough of Newport, and the adjacent Districts, in the County of Monmouth. | |
| Drainage and Improvement of Lands Supplemental Act (Ireland) 1873 or the Drainage and Improvement of Lands Supplemental (Ireland) Act 1873 | 36 & 37 Vict. c. cxcviii | 28 July 1873 |
An Act to confirm a Provisional Order under "The Drainage and Improvement of Lands (Ireland) Act, 1863," (Note: Drainage and Improvement of Lands (Ireland) Act 1863 (26 & 27 Vict. c. 88)) and the Acts amending the same, relating to Upper Gulley River Drainage District, Queen's County.
| | Upper Gully River Drainage District Order 1873 In the matter of the Upper Gully River Drainage District, in the Queen's County. | |
| Local Government Board (Ireland) Provisional Order (Belfast) Confirmation Act 1873 | 36 & 37 Vict. c. cxcix | 28 July 1873 |
An Act to confirm a Provisional Order made by the Local Government Board for Ireland concerning the Local Government of the Borough of Belfast.
| | Belfast Order 1873 Provisional Order concerning the Local Government of the Borough of Belfast. | |
| Ayr Burgh Act 1873 | 36 & 37 Vict. c. cc | 28 July 1873 |
An Act for extending the Municipal and Police Boundaries of the Burgh of Ayr; for dividing the extended Burgh for Municipal and Police Purposes into Wards; for regulating the Number and Election and defining the Powers of the Magistrates and Town Councillors of the extended Burgh; for regulating the Common Good of the Burgh; for abolishing the Petty Customs now levied therein; for empowering the Magistrates and Town Council to improve certain Streets, to extend the Market-places and Slaughter-houses, to purchase the Undertakings of the Companies which now supply the Burgh with Gas and Water, and to supply Gas and Water to the extended Burgh; and for other purposes.
| London and North-western Railway (New Works and Additional Powers) Act 1873 | 36 & 37 Vict. c. cci | 28 July 1873 |
An Act for conferring additional Powers on the London and North-western Railway Company in relation to their own Undertaking and the Undertakings of other Companies; and for other purposes.
| Ross and Ledbury Railway Act 1873 | 36 & 37 Vict. c. ccii | 28 July 1873 |
An Act for making a Railway from Ross to Ledbury, in the counties of Gloucester and Hereford; and for other purposes.
| Central Wales and Carmarthen Junction Railway Act 1873 | 36 & 37 Vict. c. cciii | 28 July 1873 |
An Act to abandon the Mumbles Extension of the Swansea and Carmarthen Railway Company, and to extend the time for the compulsory purchase of Land and completion of Railway of the Company at Carmarthen, to confer powers upon the Company with reference to the Undertakings of other Companies; and for other purposes.
| London Tramways Company (Limited) (Purchase) Act 1873 | 36 & 37 Vict. c. cciv | 28 July 1873 |
An Act for authorising the sale and transfer of the Undertakings of the Metropolitan Street Tramways Company, and the Pimlico, Peckham, and Greenwich Street Tramways Company, to the London Tramways Company, Limited; and for other purposes.
| Nottingham Gas Act 1873 (repealed) | 36 & 37 Vict. c. ccv | 28 July 1873 |
An Act for granting further powers to the Nottingham Gaslight and Coke Company. (Repealed by Statute Law (Repeals) Act 1995 (c. 44))
| Mid-Lothian Water Act 1873 | 36 & 37 Vict. c. ccvi | 28 July 1873 |
An Act for supplying with Water certain parishes and places in the county of Edinburgh.
| Bala and Festiniog Railway Act 1873 | 36 & 37 Vict. c. ccvii | 28 July 1873 |
An Act to authorise the construction of a Railway from Bala to Festiniog in the county of Merioneth; and for other purposes.
| Great Northern Railway (Melton to Leicester) Act 1873 | 36 & 37 Vict. c. ccviii | 28 July 1873 |
An Act to enable the Great Northern Railway Company to extend their Railway from Melton Mowbray to Leicester; and for other purposes.
| North British Railway Act 1873 | 36 & 37 Vict. c. ccix | 28 July 1873 |
An Act to authorise the North British Railway Company to make several Railways, and to purchase additional Station Lands; to abandon certain Railways; to extend the time for sale of certain superfluous Lands; to authorise agreements with the North Monkland Railway Company and with the Corporation of Burntisland; purchase of the Brexburn Railway, and amalgamation with the Glasgow and Milngavie Railway Company; and for other purposes.
| Midland Railway (Additional Powers) Act 1873 | 36 & 37 Vict. c. ccx | 28 July 1873 |
An Act for conferring additional powers on the Midland Railway Company for the construction of Works and for the raising of Capital; and for other purposes in relation to their own Undertaking and the Undertakings of other Companies.
| New Shoreham Harbour Act 1873 (repealed) | 36 & 37 Vict. c. ccxi | 28 July 1873 |
An Act to constitute a new body of Trustees for administering the affairs of the Harbour of New Shoreham in the county of Sussex; and for other purposes. (Repealed by New Shoreham Harbour Act 1876 (39 & 40 Vict. c. ccxi))
| Briton Ferry Dock (Transfer) Act 1873 | 36 & 37 Vict. c. ccxii | 28 July 1873 |
An Act for vesting the undertaking of the Briton Ferry Floating Dock Company in the Great Western Railway Company; and for other purposes.
| Gedney Inclosure Act 1873 | 36 & 37 Vict. c. ccxiii | 28 July 1873 |
An Act for embanking and for dividing, allotting, and enclosing Lands in the parish of Gedney in the county of Lincoln.
| Education Department Provisional Order Confirmation Act (No. 1) 1873 or the Education Department Provisional Order Confirmation (No. 1) Act 1873 | 36 & 37 Vict. c. ccxiv | 5 August 1873 |
An Act to confirm a Provisional Order made by the Education Department under "The Elementary Education Act, 1870," to enable the School Board for London to put in force "The Lands Clauses Consolidation Act, 1845," and the Acts amending the same.
| | London Order 1873 (2) Provisional Order for putting in force the Lands Clauses Consolidation Act, 1845. | |
| Metropolitan Tramways Orders Confirmation Act 1873 | 36 & 37 Vict. c. ccxv | 5 August 1873 |
An Act for confirming certain Provisional Orders made by the Board of Trade under the Tramways Act, 1870, for the construction of the London Street Tramways (Saint Pancras Lines), Metropolitan Street Tramways (Extensions), Pimlico, Peckham, and Greenwich Street Tramways (Extensions), and West London Tramways.
| | Metropolitan Street Tramways (Extension, &c.) Order 1873 Order authorising the Metropolitan Street Tramways Company to extend their authorised Tramways. | |
| | Pimlico, Peckham, and Greenwich Street Tramways (Extensions) Order 1873 Order authorising the Pimlico, Peckham, and Greenwich Street Tramways Company to extend their authorised Tramways. | |
| | West London Tramways Order 1873 Order empowering the West London Tramways Company, Limited, to construct a Tramway from Hammersmith to Kew Bridge in and beyond the Western Districts of the Metropolis. | |
| | London Street Tramways (St. Pancras Lines) Order 1873 Order authorising the London Street Tramways Company to construct Street Tramways in the Parishes of St. Pancras and St. Mary, Islington, in the County of Middlesex. | |
| Local Government Board's Provisional Orders Confirmation Act 1873 (No. 6) or the Local Government Board's Provisional Orders Confirmation (No. 6) Act 1873 | 36 & 37 Vict. c. ccxvi | 5 August 1873 |
An Act to confirm certain Provisional Orders of the Local Government Board relating to the districts of Ashbourne, Bury St. Edmunds, Epping, Fenton, Richmond (Surrey), Shipley, Stoke, Tong Street, and Ventnor.
| | Ashbourne Order 1873 Provisional Order extending the Local Government District of Ashbourne. | |
| | Bury St. Edmunds Order 1873 Provisional Order for repealing two Local Acts. (Note: Bury St. Edmund's Improvement Act 1811 (51 Geo. 3. c. ix)) (Note: Bury St. Edmunds Improvement Act 1820 (1 Geo. 4. c. lxi)) | |
| | Special Drainage District of Epping Order 1873 Provisional Order for extending the Borrowing Powers of the Sanitary Authority for the Rural Sanitary District of the Epping Union. | |
| | Fenton Order 1873 Provisional Order for partially repealing a Local Act, (Note: Staffordshire Potteries Improvement and Police Act 1839 (2 & 3 Vict. c. xliv)) and for the constitution of the Urban Sanitary District of Fenton. | |
| | Richmond Order 1873 Provisional Order to enable the Sanitary Authority for the Urban Sanitary District of the Parish of Richmond to put in forcе the Compulsory Clauses of the Lands Clauses Consolidation Act, 1845. | |
| | Shipley Order (2) 1873 Provisional Order for extending the Borrowing Powers of the Sanitary Authority for the Urban Sanitary District of Shipley. | |
| | Stoke Order 1873 Provisional Order for partially repealing a Local Act, and for the constitution of certain parts of the Parish of Stoke-upon-Trent as an Urban Sanitary District. | |
| | Tong Street Order 1873 Provisional Order extending the Borrowing Powers of the Sanitary Authority for the Urban Sanitary District of Tong Street. | |
| | Ventnor Order 1873 Provisional Order for extending the Borrowing Powers of the Sanitary Authority for the Urban Sanitary District of Ventnor. | |
| Royal Bank of Scotland Act 1873 (repealed) | 36 & 37 Vict. c. ccxvii | 5 August 1873 |
An Act to extend the powers of the Royal Bank of Scotland, and to alter and enlarge the provisions of the Charters relating thereto. (Repealed by Royal Bank of Scotland Order Confirmation Act 1970 (c. iii))
| Beckenham Sewerage Act 1873 | 36 & 37 Vict. c. ccxviii | 5 August 1873 |
An Act to make better provision for the Sewerage of a part of the parish of Beckenham in the county of Kent; and for other purposes.
| Pegwell Bay Reclamation and Sandwich Haven Improvement Act 1873 | 36 & 37 Vict. c. ccxix | 5 August 1873 |
An Act for the cultivation and improvement of certain Waste Lands in Pegwell Bay and Sandwich Flats, and the improvement of Sandwich Haven, in the county of Kent.
| Great Northern (Halifax, Thornton, and Keighley Railways) Act 1873 | 36 & 37 Vict. c. ccxx | 5 August 1873 |
An Act to authorise the construction by the Great Northern Railway Company of Railways in the West Riding of Yorkshire for connecting Keighley with Bradford and Halifax.
| London Street Tramways (Further Powers) Act 1873 | 36 & 37 Vict. c. ccxxi | 5 August 1873 |
An Act to vest in the London Street Tramways Company certain Tramways authorised by the "North Metropolitan Tramways Act, 1870," (Note: North Metropolitan Tramways Act 1870 (33 & 34 Vict. c. clxxii)) and to enable that Company to raise further moneys; and for other purposes.
| Manchester South District Railway Act 1873 | 36 & 37 Vict. c. ccxxii | 5 August 1873 |
An Act for making a Railway between Manchester, in the county of Lancaster, and Alderley, in the county of Chester, with Branches therefrom; and for other purposes.
| Metropolitan Street Tramways (Money) Act 1873 | 36 & 37 Vict. c. ccxxiii | 5 August 1873 |
An Act to authorise the Metropolitan Street Tramways Company to raise further moneys; and for other purposes.
| Kent Tramways Act 1873 | 36 & 37 Vict. c. ccxxiv | 5 August 1873 |
An Act to incorporate a Company and authorise the construction of Tramways in the county of Kent; and for other purposes.
| London and North-western Railway (Holyhead Old Harbour) Act 1873 | 36 & 37 Vict. c. ccxxv | 5 August 1873 |
An Act for enabling the London and North-western Railway Company to enlarge and improve the Old Harbour at Holyhead, and to construct works in connexion therewith; and for other purposes.
| Tunbridge Wells and Eastbourne Railways Act 1873 | 36 & 37 Vict. c. ccxxvi | 5 August 1873 |
An Act for incorporating the Tunbridge Wells and Eastbourne Railways Company; and for other purposes.
| Newent Railway Act 1873 | 36 & 37 Vict. c. ccxxvii | 5 August 1873 |
An Act for authorising the construction of Railways from Over, near the River Severn, to Newent, and from Newent to Dymock, in the county of Gloucester; and for other purposes.
| Caledonian Railway (Solway Junction Purchase) Act 1873 | 36 & 37 Vict. c. ccxxviii | 5 August 1873 |
An Act for authorising and carrying into effect the purchase by the Caledonian Railway Company of the portion of the Solway Junction Railway lying between Annan and Kirtlebridge Junction; and for other purposes.
| Didcot, Newbury, and Southampton Junction Railway Act 1873 | 36 & 37 Vict. c. ccxxix | 5 August 1873 |
An Act for making a Railway in Berkshire and Hampshire, to be called the Didcot, Newbury, and Southampton Junction Railway.
| Ely and Clydach Valleys Railway Act 1873 | 36 & 37 Vict. c. ccxxx | 5 August 1873 |
An Act for making a Railway from the Ely Valley Railway into the Clydach Valley; and for other purposes.
| Snailbeach District Railways Act 1873 | 36 & 37 Vict. c. ccxxxi | 5 August 1873 |
An Act for making a Railway from Pontesbury to Snailbeach and Tankerville in the county of Salop.
| Wrexham, Mold, and Connah's Quay Railway Company's Act 1873 or the Wrexham, Mold and Connah's Quay Railway Act 1873 | 36 & 37 Vict. c. ccxxxii | 5 August 1873 |
An Act for leasing the Buckley Railway to the Wrexham, Mold, and Connah's Quay Railway Company; and to make certain arrangements with reference to the Capital of the Wrexham. Mold. and Connah's Quay Railway Company; and for other purposes.
| Belfast Street Tramways Act 1873 | 36 & 37 Vict. c. ccxxxiii | 5 August 1873 |
An Act to authorise the Belfast Street Tramways Company to construct additional Street Tramways in the counties of Antrim and Down; and for other purposes.
| Rye and Denge-ness Railway and Pier Act 1873 or the Rye and Dungeness Railway and Pier Act 1873 | 36 & 37 Vict. c. ccxxxiv | 5 August 1873 |
An Act to authorise the construction of a Railway from near the Rye Station of the South-eastern Railway in Sussex to Denge-ness in Kent, together with a Pier at the termination thereof.
| Dover Harbour Act 1873 (repealed) | 36 & 37 Vict. c. ccxxxv | 5 August 1873 |
An Act for conferring further Powers on the Dover Harbour Board; and for other purposes. (Repealed by Dover Harbour Act 1953 (1 & 2 Eliz. 2. c. xxix))
| Edinburgh Tramways Act 1873 (repealed) | 36 & 37 Vict. c. ccxxxvi | 5 August 1873 |
An Act to extend the time for the completion of certain of the authorised Works of the Edinburgh Street Tramways Company; and for other purposes. (Repealed by Edinburgh Corporation Order Confirmation Act 1932 (22 & 23 Geo. 5. c. vii))
| Forth Bridge Railway Act 1873 | 36 & 37 Vict. c. ccxxxvii | 5 August 1873 |
An Act to authorise the construction of the Forth Bridge Railway.
| Henley-in-Arden and Great Western Junction Railway Act 1873 | 36 & 37 Vict. c. ccxxxviii | 5 August 1873 |
An Act to incorporate a Company for the purpose of making and maintaining a Railway from the Birmingham and Oxford section of the Great Western Railway in the parish of Rowington and county of Warwick to Henley-in-Arden in the same county; and for other purposes.
| Hoylake and Birkenhead Rail and Tramway Act 1873 | 36 & 37 Vict. c. ccxxxix | 5 August 1873 |
An Act to authorise the Hoylake and Birkenhead Rail and Tramway Company to extend their Railways; and for other purposes.
| Larne and Ballyclare Railway Act 1873 | 36 & 37 Vict. c. ccxl | 5 August 1873 |
An Act to authorise the Construction of a Railway from the Port of Larne to the Town and Neighbourhood of Ballyclare in the county of Antrim; and for other purposes connected with the said Railway.
| Birkenhead, Chester, and North Wales Railway Act 1873 (repealed) | 36 & 37 Vict. c. ccxli | 5 August 1873 |
An Act for making certain Railways in the counties of Chester, Flint, and Denbigh; and for other purposes. (Repealed by Birkenhead, Chester and North Wales Railway (Abandonment) Act 1878 (41 & 42 Vict. c. v))
| Criccieth Improvement Act 1873 | 36 & 37 Vict. c. ccxlii | 5 August 1873 |
An Act for the improvement of the borough of Criccieth in the county of Carnarvon.
| Dublin, Rathmines, &c. Railways Act 1873 | 36 & 37 Vict. c. ccxliii | 5 August 1873 |
An Act for conferring Powers upon the Commissioners of Her Majesty's Treasury, and for making other provisions with respect to the money deposited in respect to the application to Parliament for "The Dublin, Rathmines, &c. Railway Act, 1865." (Note: Dublin, Rathmines, &c. Railway Act 1865 (28 & 29 Vict. c. cclxv))
| Edinburgh, Loanhead, and Roslin Railway Act 1873 or the Edinburgh, Loanhead and Roslin Railway (Glencorse Extension) Act 1873 | 36 & 37 Vict. c. ccxliv | 5 August 1873 |
An Act to authorise the Edinburgh, Loanhead, and Roslin Railway Company to make and maintain certain new Railways; and for other purposes.
| Evesham, Redditch, and Stratford-upon-Avon Junction Railway Act 1873 | 36 & 37 Vict. c. ccxlv | 5 August 1873 |
An Act for making Railways to connect the Evesham and Redditch Railway with the East and West Junction Railway; and for other purposes.
| Limerick and Kerry Railway Act 1873 | 36 & 37 Vict. c. ccxlvi | 5 August 1873 |
An Act for making a Railway in the counties of Limerick and Kerry; and for other purposes.
| Metropolitan and Saint John's Wood Railway Act 1873 | 36 & 37 Vict. c. ccxlvii | 5 August 1873 |
An Act to enable the Metropolitan and Saint John's Wood Railway Company to construct Railways to join the Hampstead Junction Railway and the Midland Railway, with a Branch to Willesden, and to confer certain other powers upon the Company, and upon the London and North-western, the Midland, and the Metropolitan Railway Companies; and for other purposes.
| Southern Railway (Extension and Further Powers) Act 1873 (repealed) | 36 & 37 Vict. c. ccxlviii | 5 August 1873 |
An Act to empower the Southern Railway Company to make an Extension Railway to Cashel; to make Working Agreements with other Companies; to enable the Waterford and Limerick Railway Company to subscribe for portion of the Capital of the Company; to provide for a Baronial Guarantee on portion of the Company's Share Capital; and for other purposes. (Repealed by Statute Law (Repeals) Act 2013 (c. 2))
| Bodmin and Wadebridge and Delabole Railway Act 1873 (repealed) | 36 & 37 Vict. c. ccxlix | 5 August 1873 |
An Act for making a Railway from the Bodmin and Wadebridge Railway to Delabole; and for other purposes. (Repealed by Bodmin and Wadebridge and Delabole Railway (Abandonment) Act 1878 (41 & 42 Vict. c. vi))
| Cornwall Mineral and Bodmin and Wadebridge Junction Railway Act 1873 (repealed) | 36 & 37 Vict. c. ccl | 5 August 1873 |
An Act for incorporating the Cornwall Mineral and Bodmin and Wadebridge Junction Railway Company, and for authorising them to make and maintain the Cornwall Mineral and Bodmin and Wadebridge Junction Railway, and for authorising arrangements between them and other Railway Companies; and for other purposes. (Repealed by Cornwall Mineral and Bodmin and Wadebridge Junction Railway (Abandonment) Act 1878 (41 & 42 Vict. c. vii))
| Somerset and Dorset Railway Act 1873 | 36 & 37 Vict. c. ccli | 5 August 1873 |
An Act for conferring further Powers on the Somerset and Dorset Railway Company for the construction of Works, and otherwise in relation to their Undertaking; and for other purposes.
| Belfast, Holywood, and Bangor Railway (Lease) Act 1873 (repealed) | 36 & 37 Vict. c. cclii | 5 August 1873 |
An Act for the Lease of the Undertaking of the Belfast, Holywood, and Bangor Railway Company. (Repealed by Belfast, Holywood, and Bangor Railway Act 1876 (39 & 40 Vict. c. clxv))
| Bradford Tramways Act 1873 (repealed) | 36 & 37 Vict. c. ccliii | 5 August 1873 |
An Act for authorising the Construction of Street Tramways in certain parts of Bradford in the West Riding of the county of York, and the neighbourhood thereof; and for other purposes. (Repealed by West Yorkshire Act 1980 (c. xiv))

=== Private acts ===
| Short title | Citation | Royal assent |
Long title
| John Morison's Estate Act 1873 | 36 & 37 Vict. c. 1 Pr. | 21 July 1873 |
An Act for vesting the Lands and Estate of Cupar Grange in the county Perth in Trustees, for the purpose of being sold, and for the purchase of other lands to be entailed; and for other purposes.
| Callander's Estates Act 1873 | 36 & 37 Vict. c. 2 Pr. | 28 July 1873 |
An Act for carrying into effect an Agreement dated the first day of August one thousand eight hundred and seventy-one, between William Thomas Burn Callander and Mary Harriet Burn Callander, Spinster, of the first part; Henry Callander, an Infant, of the second part; and Mary Frederica Beauclerk Coventry or Callander, Widow, the Honourable Henry Amelius Coventry, and Henry Amelius Beauclerk Coventry, tutors and curators of the said Henry Callander, of the third part; for the compromise and settlement of claims by the said William Thomas Burn Callander and Mary Harriet Burn Callander against the entailed Estates of Crichton and Prestonhall in the county of Edinburgh, Elphinstone in the county of Haddington, and Westertown in the county of Stirling, and the heirs of entail for the time being of the said Estates, for security of the provisions mentioned in the said Agreement; and to raise Money on the Security of the said Estates for payment of the said provisions; and for other purposes relating thereto.
| Frederick Malcolmson's Divorce Act 1873 (Note: This act was not printed by the Queen's Printer.) | 36 & 37 Vict. c. 3 Pr. | 26 May 1873 |
An Act to dissolve the Marriage of Frederick Malcomson of Portlaw, in the county of Waterford, Ireland, with Marcella Malcomson his now wife, and to enable him to marry again; and for other purposes.

=== Sources ===
- The Public General Statutes passed in the Thirty-sixth and Thirty-seventh Years of the Reign of Her Majesty Queen Victoria, 1873. London: Eyre and Spottiswoode. 1873 – via Google Books.
- The Journals of the House of Commons (PDF). Vol. 128 – via parliament.uk.

== See also ==
- List of acts of the Parliament of the United Kingdom
