= Agricultural Children Act 1873 =

Act of the Parliament of the United Kingdom

Agricultural Children Act 1873 (Note: Section 1.)
- Act of Parliament
- Parliament of the United Kingdom
- Long title: An Act to regulate the Employment of Children in Agriculture.
- Citation: 36 & 37 Vict. c. 67
- Territorial extent: England and Wales (Note: Section 2.)

Dates
- Royal assent: 5 August 1873
- Commencement: 1 January 1875 (Note: Section 3.)
- Repealed: 1 January 1877
Other legislation
Repealed by	Elementary Education Act 1876

Status: Repealed

Text of statute as originally enacted

The Agricultural Children Act 1873 (36 & 37 Vict. c. 67) was an act of the Parliament of the United Kingdom, which prohibited the agricultural employment of children under the age of eight and also provided for the education of children involved in farm labour. As part of this, the act stated that children could not be employed in agricultural work without parental confirmation that they had attended school a certain number of times in the preceding twelve months, specifically 250 times for children aged eight to ten and 150 times for individuals over the age of ten.

Ultimately, the act was ineffective, and its provisions were replaced by those of the Elementary Education Act 1876 (39 & 40 Vict. c. 70) and the Elementary Education Act 1880 (43 & 44 Vict. c. 23).

== Subsequent developments ==
The whole act was repealed by section 52 of, and the fourth schedule to, the Elementary Education Act 1876 (39 & 40 Vict. c. 70), which came into force on 1 January 1877.

== See also ==
- Agricultural Gangs Act 1867

== Bibliography ==
- Chambers, George Frederick. The Agricultural Children Act, 1873, and the Agricultural Gangs Act, 1867. Knight & Co. Fleet Street, London. 1873. Scan at the Internet Archive.
- Owen, Hugh. "Agricultural Children Act, 1873". The Elementary Education Acts, 1870, 1873, 1874, and Agricultural Children Act, 1873. Tenth Edition. Knight & Co. Fleet Street, London. 1875. Page 228 et seq.
