= Portsmouth Water =

Water supply company in southern England

Portsmouth Water Ltd
- Type: Limited company
- Industry: Public utility
- Founded: 13 July 1857; 169 years ago
- Headquarters: Havant, England, United Kingdom
- Area served: Portsmouth and parts of Hampshire and West Sussex (868 km^{2})
- Key people: Bob Taylor (CEO)
- Products: Water
- Revenue: £40.3 million
- Number of employees: 251
- Parent: South Downs Capital Limited
- Website: www.portsmouthwater.co.uk

Portsmouth Water is the utility company responsible for water supply and distribution in the City of Portsmouth, part of East Hampshire and part of West Sussex. (Note: The wastewater company for this area is Southern Water.) Places served include Gosport, Fareham, Portsmouth, Havant, Chichester, and Bognor Regis. The company is a private limited company. It was acquired by Ancala in March 2018.

== History ==
Portsmouth Water Supply (Farlington) Act 1740
- Act of Parliament
- Parliament of Great Britain
- Long title: An Act to enable Thomas Smith Esquire, Lord of the Manor of Farlington, in the County of Southampton, to supply the Town of Portsmouth and Parts adjacent with good and wholesome Water, at his own proper Costs and Charges.
- Citation: 14 Geo. 2. c. 43
- Territorial extent: Great Britain

Dates
- Royal assent: 25 April 1741
- Commencement: 18 November 1740 (Note: Start of session.)
- Repealed: 13 July 1857
Other legislation
Repealed by	Borough of Portsmouth Waterworks Act 1857

Status: Repealed

Text of statute as originally enacted

Portsmouth and Portsea Water Act 1809
- Act of Parliament
- Parliament of the United Kingdom
- Long title: An Act for better supplying with Water the Borough of Portsmouth, and the Parishes of Portsmouth and Portsea, and Places adjacent, in the County of Southampton.
- Citation: 49 Geo. 3. c. cxviii
- Territorial extent: United Kingdom

Dates
- Royal assent: 27 May 1809
- Commencement: 27 May 1809 (Note: The Acts of Parliament (Commencement) Act 1793.)
Other legislation
Relates to	Portsea Island Waterworks Act 1827

Status: Current legislation

Text of statute as originally enacted

Borough of Portsmouth Waterworks Act 1857 (Note: Section 1.)
- Act of Parliament
- Parliament of the United Kingdom
- Long title: An Act for better supplying with Water the Inhabitants of the Borough of Portsmouth in the County of Southampton.
- Citation: 20 & 21 Vict. c. xlv
- Territorial extent: United Kingdom

Dates
- Royal assent: 13 July 1857
- Commencement: 13 July 1857
Other legislation
Repeals/revokes	Portsmouth Water Supply (Farlington) Act 1740
Amended by	Borough of Portsmouth Waterworks Act 1868; Borough of Portsmouth Waterworks Act 1906; Borough of Portsmouth Waterworks Act 1921; Portsmouth Water Act 1930

Status: Partially repealed

Text of statute as originally enacted

Portsea Island Waterworks Act 1827
- Act of Parliament
- Parliament of the United Kingdom
- Long title: An Act for enabling the Company of Proprietors of the Portsea Island Waterworks to raise a further Sum of Money; and for other Purposes relating to the said Undertaking.
- Citation: 7 & 8 Geo. 4. c. xxxviii
- Territorial extent: United Kingdom

Dates
- Royal assent: 28 May 1827
- Commencement: 28 May 1827
Other legislation
Amends	Portsmouth and Portsea Water Act 1809

Status: Current legislation

Text of statute as originally enacted

The company was created on 13 July 1857 by the Borough of Portsmouth Waterworks Act 1857 (20 & 21 Vict. c. xlv) as the Borough of Portsmouth Waterworks Company to supply Portsmouth. In being formed it acquired the assets of the existing United Portsmouth, Portsea and Farlington Waterworks Company. This had been formed in 1828 by the merger of the Portsmouth and Farlington Waterworks Company, created by the Portsmouth Water Supply (Farlington) Act 1740 (14 Geo. 2. c. 43), and the Portsea Island Waterworks Company, formed in 1809 by the Portsmouth and Portsea Water Act 1809 (49 Geo. 3. c. cxviii).

Gosport Waterworks Act 1858
- Act of Parliament
- Parliament of the United Kingdom
- Long title: An Act for supplying with Water the Inhabitants of Gosport, Forton, and Anglesey, and other Places in the Parish of Alverstoke in the County of Hants.
- Citation: 21 & 22 Vict. c. v
- Territorial extent: United Kingdom

Dates
- Royal assent: 11 May 1858
- Commencement: 11 May 1858
Other legislation
Amended by	Gosport Water Act 1904; Gosport Water Act 1937

Status: Partially repealed

The Gosport Waterworks Company was founded by the Gosport Waterworks Act 1858 (21 & 22 Vict. c. v).

The Borough of Portsmouth Waterworks Company merged with the Gosport Waterworks Company in 1955.

A new headquarters in Havant was opened in September 1967.

On 3 June 2021, Havant Borough Council approved Portsmouth Water's plans for a reservoir at Havant Thicket.

== Overview ==
There are now 18 borehole sites throughout the catchment area from the South Downs groundwater and the natural springs in Havant and Bedhampton. There are up to 25 springs used at any one time producing up to 170 million litres per day.

== Bibliography ==
- Neve, Andy; Hedges, Mike (2007). Portsmouth Water 1857-2007: 150 Years of Service. Havant, England: Portsmouth Water. ISBN 978-0-9556045-0-8.
