= Isle of Man Act 1958 =

Act of the Parliament of the United Kingdom

Isle of Man Act 1958 (Note: Section 3.)
- Act of Parliament
- Parliament of the United Kingdom
- Long title: An Act to repeal certain enactments relating to the Isle of Man; to empower the Court of Tynwald to make provision with regard to customs and harbours; to provide for the payment to the Isle of Man of a share of certain duties; and for purposes connected therewith.
- Citation: 6 & 7 Eliz. 2. c. 11
- Territorial extent: United Kingdom; Isle of Man

Dates
- Royal assent: 20 February 1958
- Commencement: 20 February 1958 (Note: The Acts of Parliament (Commencement) Act 1793.)
- Repealed: 1 April 1980
Other legislation
Repeals/revokes	Isle of Man Customs, Harbours, and Public Purposes Act 1866; Isle of Man Customs Act 1887; Metalliferous Isle of Man Act 1891; Isle of Man Loans Act 1931; Isle of Man (Customs) Act 1955; Isle of Man (Officers) Act 1876; Isle of Man (Officers) Act 1882
Amended by	Statute Law (Repeals) Act 1974; Statute Law (Repeals) Act 1977; Statute Law (Repeals) Act 1978; Customs and Excise Management Act 1979
Repealed by	Isle of Man Act 1979

Status: Repealed

Text of statute as originally enacted

The Isle of Man Act 1958 (6 & 7 Eliz. 2. c. 11) was an act of the Parliament of the United Kingdom that restated the Common Purse Agreement between the United Kingdom and the Isle of Man.

It also ended control by the UK Treasury over Manx finances, and granted Tynwald powers to legislate with regard to customs, harbours, loans, mines, the police and the civil service.

== Provisions ==
=== Repealed enactments ===
Section 1 of the act repealed 17 enactments, listed in parts I, II and III of the schedule to the act.

Part I
Citation	Short title	Extent of repeal
29 & 30 Vict. c. 23	Isle of Man Customs, Harbours, and Public Purposes Act 1866	The whole act.
35 & 36 Vict. c. 77	Metalliferous Mines Regulation Act 1872	The whole act so far as it applies to the Isle of Man.
38 & 39 Vict. c. 39	Metalliferous Mines Regulation Act 1875	The whole act so far as it applies to the Isle of Man.
43 & 44 Vict. c. 8	Isle of Man Loans Act 1880	The whole act except sections six and seven.
50 & 51 Vict. c. 5	Isle of Man (Customs) Act 1887	The whole act.
51 & 52 Vict. c. 39	Public Works Loans Act 1888	Section eight.
54 & 55 Vict. c. 47	Metalliferous Mines (Isle of Man) Act 1891	The whole act.
57 & 58 Vict. c. 42	Quarries Act 1894	The whole act so far as it applies to the Isle of Man.
60 & 61 Vict. c. 51	Public Works Loans Act 1897	Section ten.
21 & 22 Geo. 5. c. 38	Isle of Man Loans Act 1931	The whole act.
3 & 4 Eliz. 2. c. 17	Isle of Man (Customs) Act 1955	The whole act.

Part II
Citation	Short title	Extent of repeal
43 & 44 Vict. c. 8	Isle of Man Loans Act 1880	In section six the words "with the approval of the Treasury", the words "created in pursuance of this Act" and the words "acting with the approval of the Treasury." In section seven the words "under this Act."
56 & 57 Vict. c. 53	Trustee Act 1893	In section five, in subsection (4), the words "under the Isle of Man Loans Act, 1880."
11 & 12 Geo. 5. c. 58	Trusts (Scotland) Act 1921	In section twelve, in subsection (3), the words "under the Isle of Man Loans Act, 1880."
15 & 16 Geo. 5. c. 19	Trustee Act 1925	In section five, in subsection (5), the words "under the Isle of Man Loans Act, 1880."

Part III
Citation	Short title	Extent of repeal
39 & 40 Vict. c. 43	Isle of Man (Officers) Act 1876	The whole act.
45 & 46 Vict. c. 46	Isle of Man (Officers) Act 1882	The whole act.

== Subsequent developments ==
Section 1(1) and (2) of, and the schedule to, the act were repealed by section 1 of, and part XI of the schedule to, the Statute Law (Repeals) Act 1974, which came into force on 27 June 1974.

The whole act was repealed by section 14(5) of, and schedule 2 to, the Isle of Man Act 1979 (c. 58), which came into force on 1 April 1980.
