= Customs (Isle of Man) Tariff Act 1874 =

Act of the Parliament of the United Kingdom

Customs (Isle of Man) Tariff Act 1874 (Note: Section 7.)
- Act of Parliament
- Parliament of the United Kingdom
- Long title: An Act to consolidate and amend the Duties of Customs in the Isle of Man.
- Citation: 37 & 38 Vict. c. 46
- Territorial extent: Isle of Man (Note: Long title.)

Dates
- Royal assent: 30 July 1874
- Commencement: 30 July 1874 (Note: The Acts of Parliament (Commencement) Act 1793.)
- Repealed
Other legislation
Amends	See § Repealed enactments
Repeals/revokes	See § Repealed enactments
Amended by	Statute Law Revision Act 1883; Isle of Man (Customs) Act 1895; Isle of Man (Customs) Act 1900
Repealed by	Customs and Excise Legislation (Application) Order 1976; Customs and Excise Act (Application) Order 1979
Relates to	Isle of Man (Customs) Acts

Status: Repealed

Text of statute as originally enacted

The Customs (Isle of Man) Tariff Act 1874 (37 & 38 Vict. c. 46) was an act of the Parliament of the United Kingdom that consolidated enactments related to customs duties in the Isle of Man.

== Background ==
Under the Isle of Man Customs, Harbours, and Public Purposes Act 1866 (29 & 30 Vict. c. 23), the Manx government had been given the power to collect and retain the customs duties levied on goods imported into the Isle of Man. The act consolidated the various duties of customs then chargeable in the Isle of Man, which had previously been imposed and amended by a series of separate enactments, into a single tariff.

== Provisions ==
=== Repealed enactments ===
Section 6 of the act repealed 5 enactments, listed in schedule A to the act.

Citation	Short title	Extent of repeal
18 & 19 Vict. c. 97	Customs Tariff Act 1855	Section one, so far as regards the Isle of Man, and Table B. and section two.
29 & 30 Vict. c. 23	Isle of Man Customs, Harbours, and Public Purposes Act 1866	Sections one and two.
30 & 31 Vict. c. 86	Isle of Man Customs Duties Act 1867	The whole act.
35 & 36 Vict. c. 20	Customs and Inland Revenue Act 1872	So much of section two as relates to the Isle of Man.
36 & 37 Vict. c. 29	Customs Sugar Duties (Isle of Man) Act 1873	The whole act.

== Subsequent developments ==
The whole act was repealed, as it applied to the Isle of Man, by the Customs and Excise Legislation (Application) Order 1976 (G.C. 1/76) and the Customs and Excise Act (Application) Order 1979 (G.C. 38/79), orders made under the Isle of Man's own customs and excise legislation.
