= Common Purse Agreement =

The Common Purse Agreement entitles the Isle of Man to a share in the United Kingdom's Customs and Excise revenues in return for being in customs union with the UK and not charging any import duties on goods from the UK, or that have been imported through the UK.

The agreement is so called because it effectively sets up a 'common purse' for the receipt of excise duties and revenue, which is then split between both treasuries according to agreed formulas.

== Common Duties Agreement ==
There were various agreements dating back to the 17th century. In 1911 the Isle of Man Constitution Committee (the MacDonnell Inquiry) described the Common Purse agreement in these terms:

[…] the public services of the Island are financed from Customs Duties collected by officers of the Imperial Customs between 20% to 21% per goods item. Where the Manx duties differ from those of the United Kingdom—in practice, where they are lower—they are levied in the Island and the actual proceeds are credited to the Manx Exchequer. Where they are identical, and where, in consequence, goods may be moved freely between the two countries without Customs restrictions, an arrangement called a 'Common Purse' exists, whereby the Island receives in respect of such duties the same amount per capita as Great Britain does, plus an addition, calculated according to a formula which allows for the number of persons temporarily visiting the Island and the larger quantity of dutiable commodities which it is calculated they consume.

— MacDonnell Inquiry, c.6. s.38.

In summary, the combined Customs revenue was first divided proportional to population. In addition to this, the Island's government received a sum per visitor. It appears that this additional allowance was significant:

[Manx Revenues] depend very largely on the Customs Duties derived from articles consumed by visitors to the Island.

— MacDonnell Inquiry, c.6 s.53.

=== Customs and Excise Agreement 1979 ===
The latest formalisation of this arrangement was signed on 15 October 1979 as the Customs and Excise Agreement 1979, and introduced by the Isle of Man Act 1979 (An Act of Parliament). It is basically a revenue-sharing system, and is the latest agreement that builds on the Customs Etc. Agreement 1957, which stated that Tynwald could not introduce any differences to UK indirect taxation (except on beer) without the permission of the UK Treasury (in preparation for the UK Parliament empowering Tynwald with control over Manx indirect taxation in the Customs (Isle of Man) Act 1958).

In addition, this means that VAT must be charged on Mann at the same rate as in the UK, and all VAT receipts are paid to the UK Treasury (but then repaid to the Manx Treasury through this agreement), but the agreement is generally accepted as being advantageous to the Isle of Man.

There have been differences in indirect taxation agreed, for example in 2003 UK betting and gaming duty was set at 15%, whilst the Isle of Man brought in a lower rate of 10%.

According to the Isle of Man Treasury, 'Neither the amount actually received, nor the exact method of calculation of the Island's share of the common duties and taxes, is in the public domain'. It is therefore not known how much is received by the Isle of Man from the United Kingdom. Despite this, in a Tynwald debate in December 2005, the Minister for Tourism and Leisure revealed that every visitor to Mann from the UK, even if only on a day visit, was worth £50 to the Isle of Man Treasury in additional Common Purse allowance.

=== Sharing the common duties ===
==== Until 2007 ====
1. The common duties collected by the two jurisdictions are pooled.
  Revenue attributed to specialist business and government sectors is excluded from the pool, and retained by the originating jurisdiction.
  Taxes not pooled include those relating to:
  - accommodation
  - sports and recreation
  - film-making
  - financial services
  - gambling and betting
2. Taxes are then distributed in one of three ways:
  - Actual consumption basis
  - Residential population basis
  - Fiscal population basis

===== Actual consumption basis =====
Revenue is shared on the basis of actual consumption, and therefore actual revenue yield in each jurisdiction.

Taxes apportioned in this way:

- Hydrocarbon oil duty
- Lottery duty

===== Residential population basis =====
Revenue is shared proportional to the number of residents in each jurisdiction.

Population estimates used for 2005 financial year:

- United Kingdom: 60,303,151
- Isle of Man: 78,391

Taxes apportioned in this way:

- Value added tax
- Pool betting duty
- Agricultural duties

===== Fiscal population basis =====
The fiscal population is calculated to adjust the real population to take account of visitors to the Isle of Man. No account is made of visitors to the United Kingdom. Each visitor adds approximately 0.18 of a head to the population count.

In the 2005 financial year there were 323,018 visitors to the Island, resulting in an adjustment of 58,903 to the population figure.

Fiscal population estimates used for 2005 financial year:

- United Kingdom: 60,303,151
- Isle of Man: 137,295

Taxes apportioned in this way:

- Tobacco duties
- Alcohol duties
- Customs duties
- Anti-dumping duties

== Services contribution to UK Treasury ==
As with the other Crown Dependencies, the Isle of Man makes a payment to the United Kingdom Treasury in respect of the services provided to the island: the constitutional responsibilities are defence, foreign representation (including consular assistance), and ensuring good governance within the Island.

The Islands are internally self-supporting and neither receive subsidies from, nor pay contributions to, the United Kingdom. The Isle of Man, Jersey and Guernsey make annual contributions towards the cost of common services such as defence and overseas representation.

— A Guide to Government Business involving the Channel Islands and the Isle of Man, Department of Constitutional Affairs, 2002

This payment was first introduced by the Isle of Man Customs, Harbours, and Public Purposes Act 1866 (An Act of Parliament). This payment replaced a previous arrangement whereby the UK Treasury had retained all surplus Manx revenue – from 1866 onwards this surplus would be paid into the new Manx Accumulated Fund. No specific purpose or justification was stated for the payment.

Subject to the charges aforesaid the sum of ten thousand pounds out of the duties shall be brought and paid into the Receipt of Her Majesty's Exchequer distinctly and apart from all other branches of the public revenue, and shall go and make part of the Consolidated Fund of the United Kingdom of Great Britain and Ireland.

— Isle of Man Customs, Harbours and Public Purposes Act 1866, s.7.

The MacDonnell Inquiry in 1911 reported that it had received a request from Tynwald for a reduction in the contribution, which was still at that time fixed at £10,000 per annum. In refusing to reduce the figure, the Inquiry noted that the Island enjoyed 'national protection' and 'manifold national advantages'.

The annual contribution set in the Customs, Harbours and Public Purposes Act 1866 was supplemented by a new formula in the Isle of Man Contribution Act 1956 (An Act of Tynwald). This Act explicitly specified that the payment was for 'defence and other common services', and in the associated Annual Contribution Agreement the amount was set at 5% of the Island's Common Purse receipts, at the time around £100,000.

The Isle of Man Act 1958 (An Act of Parliament) repealed the 1866 Act of Parliament, thereby ending the legal obligation to pay £10,000 that had remained in force until that time.

In 1973, the Kilbrandon Commission on the Constitution stated that the contribution should be considered a voluntary payment.

It seems clear to us that any […] change in the contribution made by the Isle of Man, should be made on a voluntary basis. The value to the Islands of the services concerned, mainly defence and overseas representation, is not quantifiable, at least with any degree of precision, and any attempt to estimate what the level of contributions, if any, should be would have to take into account the Islands’ capacity to pay. In our view, if this matter is to be pursued at all it should be by means of direct discussion between the United Kingdom and Island Governments.

— 'Imperial Contributions', Report of the Royal Commission on the Constitution

In 1978, Tynwald halved the percentage of the Common Purse receipts that were remitted to the UK Treasury from 5% to 2.5%. This change was imposed unilaterally by the Isle of Man without consultation with the United Kingdom, who continued to press for a 5% payment.

The Contribution Act 1956 required annual extension by Tynwald, and this was withheld in 1992.

A new agreement was reached in 1994 whereby a payment of £1,750,000 would be made, to be increased in line with changes in GDP (for comparison, the 1992 payment had been £2,295,247). It was stated that the sum "does not and will not reflect either the range of, nor the net true cost of the respective services mutually provided by the two Governments" and that "the United Kingdom Government accepts such annual amount as a token of appreciation and support by the Isle of Man Government to the United Kingdom Government."

=== Common Services Agreement ===
Today, the Isle of Man has a Common Services Agreement with the United Kingdom, whereby payment is made for defence, foreign representation, and other work done by the departments of the UK Government on behalf of the Island and its people – excluding NHS health care in the UK for Manx residents, which is currently charged to the Isle of Man Government on an 'as-used' basis. In 2002 the payment made was £2.4 million, and is a set proportion of Common Purse receipts. However, if defence alone was proportioned according to the relative populations, the Manx contribution would be in excess of £29 million, some ten times larger.
