= Isle of Man (Customs) Acts =

Isle of Man Customs Act 1811
- Act of Parliament
- Parliament of the United Kingdom
- Long title: An Act for explaining and amending an Act passed in the last Session of Parliament, for consolidating the Duties of Customs for the Isle of Man, and for placing the same under the Management of the Commissioners of Customs in England.
- Citation: 51 Geo. 3. c. 52
- Territorial extent: United Kingdom; Isle of Man; (Note: Long title.)

Dates
- Royal assent: 31 May 1811
- Commencement: 31 May 1811 (Note: The Acts of Parliament (Commencement) Act 1793.)
- Repealed: 5 July 1825
Other legislation
Amends	Isle of Man Customs Act 1810
Repealed by	Customs Law Repeal Act 1825

Status: Repealed

Text of statute as originally enacted

Importation into Isle of Man Act 1813
- Act of Parliament
- Parliament of the United Kingdom
- Long title: An Act to suspend the Exportation of Foreign Spirits from Great Britain to the Isle of Man under Licence from the Commissioners of Customs, and to permit the Exportation of a limited Quantity of Irish Spirits in lieu thereof, under Licence from the Commissioners of Customs and Port Duties in Ireland, from certain Ports of that Part of the Kingdom to the said Isle, until the Fifth Day of July One thousand eight hundred and fourteen.
- Citation: 53 Geo. 3. c. 110
- Territorial extent: Great Britain; Isle of Man

Dates
- Royal assent: 10 July 1813
- Commencement: 10 July 1813
- Expired: 5 July 1814 (Note: Section 1.)
- Repealed: 5 August 1873
Other legislation
Amends	Smuggling, etc. Act 1805
Repealed by	Statute Law Revision Act 1873

Status: Repealed

Text of statute as originally enacted

Isle of Man Customs Duties Act 1867 (Note: Section 2.)
- Act of Parliament
- Parliament of the United Kingdom
- Long title: An Act to alter certain Duties of Customs in the Isle of Man.
- Citation: 30 & 31 Vict. c. 86
- Territorial extent: Isle of Man

Dates
- Royal assent: 12 August 1867
- Commencement: 1 September 1867
- Repealed: 25 July 1874
Other legislation
Repealed by	Customs (Isle of Man) Tariff Act 1874

Status: Repealed

Text of statute as originally enacted

Customs (Isle of Man) Act 1870
- Act of Parliament
- Parliament of the United Kingdom
- Long title: An Act to repeal certain Duties of Customs in the Isle of Man.
- Citation: 33 & 34 Vict. c. 12
- Territorial extent: Isle of Man

Dates
- Royal assent: 12 May 1870
- Commencement: 12 May 1870
- Repealed: 24 July 1876
Other legislation
Amends	Customs Tariff Act 1855
Repealed by	Customs Consolidation Act 1876

Status: Repealed

Text of statute as originally enacted

Isle of Man (Customs) Act 1887
- Act of Parliament
- Parliament of the United Kingdom
- Long title: An Act to amend the law respecting the Customs Duties of the Isle of Man.
- Citation: 50 & 51 Vict. c. 5
- Territorial extent: Isle of Man

Dates
- Royal assent: 28 April 1887
- Commencement: 28 April 1887
- Repealed: 20 February 1958
Other legislation
Amended by	Isle of Man (Customs) Act 1895; Isle of Man (Customs) Act 1955
Repealed by	Isle of Man Act 1958

Status: Repealed

Text of statute as originally enacted

Isle of Man (Customs) Act 1888
- Act of Parliament
- Parliament of the United Kingdom
- Long title: An Act to impose certain Duties of Customs on Spirits imported into the Isle of Man.
- Citation: 51 & 52 Vict. c. 7
- Territorial extent: Isle of Man

Dates
- Royal assent: 16 May 1888
- Commencement: 16 May 1888
- Repealed: 6 July 1895
Other legislation
Repealed by	Isle of Man (Customs) Act 1895

Status: Repealed

Text of statute as originally enacted

Isle of Man Customs Act 1892
- Act of Parliament
- Parliament of the United Kingdom
- Long title: An Act to amend the Law respecting the Customs Duties in the Isle of Man.
- Citation: 55 & 56 Vict. c. 28
- Territorial extent: Isle of Man

Dates
- Royal assent: 27 June 1892
- Commencement: 27 June 1892
- Repealed: 6 July 1895
Other legislation
Repealed by	Isle of Man (Customs) Act 1895

Status: Repealed

Text of statute as originally enacted

Isle of Man (Customs) Act 1895 (Note: Section 4.)
- Act of Parliament
- Parliament of the United Kingdom
- Long title: An Act to amend the Law respecting the Customs Duties in the Isle of Man.
- Citation: 58 & 59 Vict. c. 38
- Territorial extent: Isle of Man

Dates
- Royal assent: 6 July 1895
- Commencement: 6 July 1895
- Repealed: 9 June 1933
Other legislation
Amends	Customs (Isle of Man) Tariff Act 1874; Isle of Man (Customs) Act 1887
Repeals/revokes	Isle of Man (Customs) Act 1888; Isle of Man Customs Act 1892
Amended by	Isle of Man (Customs) Act 1900
Repealed by	Isle of Man (Customs) Act 1933

Status: Repealed

Text of statute as originally enacted

Isle of Man (Customs) Act 1898
- Act of Parliament
- Parliament of the United Kingdom
- Long title: An Act to amend the Law with respect to Customs Duties in the Isle of Man.
- Citation: 61 & 62 Vict. c. 27
- Territorial extent: Isle of Man

Dates
- Royal assent: 2 August 1898
- Commencement: 27 May 1898 (spirits); 16 May 1898 (tobacco); (Note: Section 1(2).)
- Repealed: 1 July 1930
Other legislation
Repealed by	Isle of Man (Customs) Act 1930

Status: Repealed

Text of statute as originally enacted

Isle of Man (Customs) Act 1899
- Act of Parliament
- Parliament of the United Kingdom
- Long title: An Act to amend the Law with respect to Customs Duties in the Isle of Man.
- Citation: 62 & 63 Vict. c. 39
- Territorial extent: Isle of Man

Dates
- Royal assent: 9 August 1899
- Commencement: 26 May 1899
- Repealed: 24 May 1927
Other legislation
Repealed by	Isle of Man (Customs) Act 1927

Status: Repealed

Text of statute as originally enacted

Isle of Man (Customs) Act 1900 (Note: Section 4.)
- Act of Parliament
- Parliament of the United Kingdom
- Long title: An Act to amend the Law with respect to Customs Duties in the Isle of Man.
- Citation: 63 & 64 Vict. c. 31
- Territorial extent: Isle of Man

Dates
- Royal assent: 6 August 1900
- Commencement: 1 August 1900 (in part) (Note: Section 1.); 8 March 1900 (in part) (Note: Section 2.)
- Repealed: 12 July 1932
Other legislation
Amends	Customs (Isle of Man) Tariff Act 1874; Isle of Man (Customs) Act 1895
Repealed by	Isle of Man (Customs) (No. 2) Act 1932

Status: Repealed

Text of statute as originally enacted

Isle of Man (Customs) Act 1955 (Note: Section 3.)
- Act of Parliament
- Parliament of the United Kingdom
- Long title: An Act to provide for confirming resolutions of the Court of Tynwald with respect to customs duties in the Isle of Man and to authorise the Court of Tynwald to carry out any agreement made with the Government of the United Kingdom as to the payment into the Exchequer of any of the proceeds of those duties.
- Citation: 3 & 4 Eliz. 2. c. 17
- Territorial extent: United Kingdom; Isle of Man

Dates
- Royal assent: 6 May 1955
- Commencement: 6 May 1955
- Repealed: 20 February 1958
Other legislation
Amends	Isle of Man (Customs) Act 1887
Repealed by	Isle of Man Act 1958

Status: Repealed

Text of statute as originally enacted

Each year between 1870 and 1955 the Parliament of the United Kingdom passed an Isle of Man (Customs) Act to impose customs duties on goods imported into the Isle of Man.

An Act to amend the Law with respect to Customs Duties in the Isle of Man. — Long title used for most Isle of Man (Customs) Acts

The Isle of Man Customs, Harbours, and Public Purposes Act 1866 (29 & 30 Vict. c. 23) (an Act of Parliament) passed power to the Manx Government to collect and retain customs duties, and the Isle of Man Treasury was created in that year as a result, with John Clucas as the first Treasurer.

The Isle of Man (Customs) Act 1887 (50 & 51 Vict. c. 5) empowered Tynwald with the power to alter the rates of customs duties with temporary effect, subject to confirmation by the annual acts of Parliament. The Isle of Man (Customs) Act 1955 (3 & 4 Eliz. 2. c. 17) substituted confirmation by Order in Council, thereby ending the requirement for these acts to be passed annually. The Isle of Man Act 1958 (6 & 7 Eliz. 2. c. 11) finally gave the island's insular legislature, Tynwald, the power to pass laws to impose such duties without requiring any confirmation.

== See also ==
- List of acts of the Parliament of the United Kingdom
