= Isle of Man Customs Act 1810 =

Act of the Parliament of the United Kingdom

- Act of Parliament
- Parliament of the United Kingdom
- Long title: An Act for consolidating the Duties of Customs for the Isle of Man, and for placing the same under the Management of the Commissioners of Customs in England.
- Citation: 50 Geo. 3. c. 42
- Territorial extent: United Kingdom

Dates
- Royal assent: 2 June 1810
- Commencement: 5 July 1810 (Note: Section 1.)
- Repealed: 5 July 1826 (Note: Section 1 of the Customs Law Repeal Act 1825 (6 Geo. 4. c. 105).)

Other legislation
- Amends: Customs (No. 4) Act 1766; Smuggling, etc. Act 1805
- Amended by: Isle of Man Customs Act 1811
- Repealed by: Customs Law Repeal Act 1825

Status: Repealed

Text of statute as originally enacted

The Isle of Man Customs Act 1810 (50 Geo. 3. c. 42) was an act of the Parliament of the United Kingdom that consolidated the duties of customs payable on goods imported into the Isle of Man and placed their collection under the management of the Commissioners of Customs in England.

== Subsequent developments ==
The whole act was repealed by section 276 of the Customs Law Repeal Act 1825 (6 Geo. 4. c. 105), which came into force on 5 July 1826. The Customs Law Repeal Act 1825 was one of a series of acts passed in 1825 to repeal and consolidate the customs law of the United Kingdom, and was itself later repealed, as spent, by the Statute Law Revision Act 1873 (36 & 37 Vict. c. 91).
