= Spirits Act 1880 =

Act of the Parliament of the United Kingdom

Spirits Act 1880 (Note: Section 1.)
- Act of Parliament
- Parliament of the United Kingdom
- Long title: An Act to consolidate and amend the Law relating to the Manufacture and Sale of Spirits.
- Citation: 43 & 44 Vict. c. 24
- Territorial extent: United Kingdom

Dates
- Royal assent: 26 August 1880
- Commencement: 1 January 1881 (Note: Section 2.)
- Repealed: 1 January 1953
Other legislation
Amends	See § Repealed enactments
Repeals/revokes	See § Repealed enactments
Amended by	Revenue Act 1889; Customs and Inland Revenue Act 1890; Statute Law Revision Act 1894; Finance Act 1921; Finance (No. 2) Act 1945
Repealed by	Customs and Excise Act 1952

Status: Repealed

Text of statute as originally enacted

The Spirits Act 1880 (43 & 44 Vict. c. 24) was an act of the Parliament of the United Kingdom that consolidated enactments related to the manufacture and sale of spirits in the United Kingdom.

== Provisions ==
=== Repealed enactments ===
Section 164 of the act repealed 23 enactments, listed in the fifth schedule to the act.

Citation		Description	Extent of repeal
10 Will. 3 c. 4 (Note: This is the citation in The Statutes of the Realm.)	Distillation Act 1698	An Act to prohibit the excessive distilling of spirits and low wines from corn, and against the exporting of beer and ale, and to prevent frauds on distillers.	Sections five and eight. (Note: This was the remaining part of the act in force.,)
30 Geo. 3 c. 38	Retail of Liquors Act 1790	An Act for repealing the duties upon licences for retailing wine and sweets and upon licences for retailing distilled spirituous liquors, and for granting other duties in lieu thereof.	Section fifteen.
4 Geo. 4 c. 94	Duties on Spirits Act 1823	An Act to grant certain duties of Excise upon spirits distilled from corn or grain in Scotland and Ireland, and upon licences for stills for making such spirits; and to provide for the better collecting and securing such duties, and for the warehousing of such spirits without payment of duty.	The whole act.
6 Geo. 4 c. 80	Duties on Spirits Act 1825	An Act to repeal the duties payable in respect of spirits distilled in England, and of licences for distilling, rectifying, or compounding such spirits, and for the sale of spirits, and to impose other duties in lieu thereof; and to provide other regulations for the collection of the said duties, and for the sale of spirits, and for the warehousing of such spirits without payment of duty, for exportation.	Section one hundred and forty-five.
18 & 19 Vict. c. 38	Spirit of Wine Act 1855	An Act to allow spirit of wine to be used duty free in the arts and manufactures of the United Kingdom.	The whole act, except section three.
18 & 19 Vict. c. 94	Excise Act 1855	An Act to impose increased rates of duty of Excise on spirits distilled in the United Kingdom, to allow malt, sugar, and molasses to be used duty free in the distilling of spirits, in lieu of allowances and drawbacks on such spirits, sugar, and molasses respectively; and to amend the laws relating to the duties of excise.	Section fourteen in part, namely, the words "and all malt to be used in the distillery shall be ground by metal rollers only."
23 & 24 Vict. c. 114	Spirits Act 1860	An Act to reduce into one Act and to amend the excise regulations relating to the distilling, rectifying, and dealing in spirits.	The whole act.
24 & 25 Vict. c. 21	Revenue (No. 1) Act 1861	An Act for granting to Her Majesty certain duties of Excise and stamps.	Section two in part, namely, from "and any licensed" to the end of the section.
24 & 25 Vict. c. 91	Revenue (No. 2) Act 1861	An Act to amend the laws relating to the Inland Revenue.	Sections three, four, six, and twelve.
27 & 28 Vict. c. 12	Warehousing of British Spirits Act 1864	An Act to amend the laws relating to the warehousing of British spirits.	Sections twenty-three, twenty-seven, twenty-eight, and twenty-nine.
28 & 29 Vict. c. 96	Revenue (No. 2) Act 1865	An Act to amend the laws relating to the Inland Revenue.	The whole act, except section twelve.
28 & 29 Vict. c. 98	Warehousing of British Compounded Spirits Act 1865	An Act to allow British compounded spirits to be warehoused upon drawback.	The whole act.
29 & 30 Vict. c. 64	Inland Revenue Act 1866	An Act to amend the laws relating to the Inland Revenue.	Sections seven, eight, and nine.
30 & 31 Vict. c. 27	Warehoused British Spirits Act 1867	An Act to allow warehoused British spirits to be bottled for home consumption.	The whole act.
31 & 32 Vict. c. 124	Inland Revenue Act 1868	An Act to amend the laws relating to the Inland Revenue.	Sections three, four, and five.
32 & 33 Vict. c. 103	Customs and Excise Warehousing Act 1869	An Act to amend the law relating to the warehousing of wines and spirits in Customs and Excise warehouses, and for other purposes relating to Customs and Inland Revenue.	Sections two, six, eight, twelve, thirteen, and fifteen (except section seven), so far as they relate to spirits, and sections fourteen and sixteen.
34 & 35 Vict. c. 103	House Tax Act 1871	An Act to amend the law relating to the Customs and Inland Revenue.	Sections twenty-one, twenty-two, and twenty-three.
37 & 38 Vict. c. 16	Customs and Inland Revenue Act 1874	An Act to grant certain duties of Customs and Inland Revenue, to repeal and alter other duties, and to amend the laws relating to Customs and Inland Revenue.	Sections nineteen and twenty.
38 & 39 Vict. c. 23	Customs and Inland Revenue Act 1875	An Act to grant certain duties of Customs and Inland Revenue, to alter other duties, and to amend the laws relating to Customs and Inland Revenue.	Section ten.
39 & 40 Vict. c. 16	Customs and Inland Revenue Act 1876	An Act to grant and alter certain duties of Customs and Inland Revenue, and to amend the laws relating to Customs and Inland Revenue.	Section three.
39 & 40 Vict. c. 35	Customs Tariff Act 1876	An Act for consolidating the Duties of Customs.	Section three in part, namely, the words "or Inland Revenue," "or Excise," "respectively," and "or Inland Revenue respectively." Section four in part, namely, the words "or Inland Revenue" and "or Inland Revenue respectively."
40 & 41 Vict. c. 13	Customs, Inland Revenue, and Savings Banks Act 1877	An Act to grant certain duties of Customs and Inland Revenue, and to amend the laws relating to Customs, Inland Revenue, and savings banks.	Section eleven.
41 & 42 Vict. c. 15	Customs and Inland Revenue Act 1878	An Act to grant certain duties of Customs and Inland Revenue, to alter other duties, and to amend the laws relating to Customs and Inland Revenue.	Section twenty-four.

== Subsequent developments ==
The Statute Law Revision Act 1894 (57 & 58 Vict. c. 56) removed section 2 (which provided for the commencement of the act), provisions applying the act to Scotland from sections 144, 145, and 146, savings provisions from section 164, and the fifth schedule. The Finance (No. 2) Act 1945 (9 & 10 Geo. 6 c. 13) increased certain penalties, repealed provisions relating to allowances on exported or used spirits, and empowered the Commissioners to make regulations substituting for the act's provisions as applied to distillers.

The whole act was repealed by section 320(1) of, and part I of the twelfth schedule to, the Customs and Excise Act 1952 (15 & 16 Geo. 6 & 1 Eliz. 2 c. 44), which came into operation on 1 January 1953.
