= Spirits Act 1860 =

Act of the Parliament of the United Kingdom

- Act of Parliament
- Parliament of the United Kingdom
- Long title: An Act to reduce into One Act and to amend the Excise Regulations relating to the distilling, rectifying, and dealing in Spirits.
- Citation: 23 & 24 Vict. c. 114
- Territorial extent: United Kingdom (Note: Section 203.)

Dates
- Royal assent: 28 August 1860
- Commencement: 1 October 1860 (Note: Section 203.)
- Repealed: 1 January 1881

Other legislation
- Amends: See § Repealed enactments
- Repeals/revokes: See § Repealed enactments
- Amended by: Customs and Inland Revenue Act 1874; Inland Revenue Act 1880
- Repealed by: Spirits Act 1880

Status: Repealed

Text of statute as originally enacted

The Spirits Act 1860 (23 & 24 Vict. c. 114) was an act of the Parliament of the United Kingdom that consolidated enactments related to the distilling, rectifying, and dealing in spirits in the United Kingdom.

== Provisions ==
=== Repealed enactments ===
Section 202 of the act repealed 26 enactments, listed in the schedule C to the act.

Citation	Short title	Description	Extent of repeal
28 Geo. 3. c. 46	Excise (No. 2) Act 1788	An Act for discontinuing for a limited Time the several Duties payable in Scotland upon Low Wines and Spirits, and upon Worts, Wash, and other Liquors there used in the Distillation of Spirits, and for granting to His Majesty other Duties in lieu thereof; and for better regulating the Exportation of British-made Spirits from England to Scotland and from Scotland to England; and to continue for a limited Time an Act made in the Twenty-sixth Year of the Reign of His present Majesty, to discontinue for a limited Time the Payment of the Duties upon Low Wines and Spirits for Home Consumption; and for granting and securing the due Payment of other Duties in lieu thereof; and for the better Regulation of the making and vending British Spirits; and for discontinuing for a limited Time certain Imposts and Duties upon Rum and Spirits imported from the West Indies.	The whole act. (Note: This repeal was qualified by section 2 of the Excise Duties Act 1862 (25 & 26 Vict. c. 84). The whole act was repealed by section 1 of, and the schedule to, the Statute Law Revision Act 1871 (34 & 35 Vict. c. 116).)
1 & 2 Geo. 4. c. 82	Drawback on Malt Act 1821	An Act for allowing to Distillers of Spirits for Home Consumption in Scotland a Drawback of a Portion of the Duty on Malt used by them; and for the further Prevention of Smuggling of Spirits on the Borders of Scotland and England.	The whole act. (Note: This repeal was qualified by section 2 of the Excise Duties Act 1862 (25 & 26 Vict. c. 84). The whole act was repealed by section 1 of, and the schedule to, the Statute Law Revision Act 1873 (36 & 37 Vict. c. 91).)
3 Geo. 4. c. 52	Illicit Distillation (Scotland) Act 1822	An Act to grant certain Duties in Scotland upon Wash or Spirits made from Corn or Grain, and upon Licences for making and keeping of Stills, and to regulate the Distillation of such Spirits for Home Consumption; and for better preventing private Distillation in Scotland, until the Tenth Day of November One thousand eight hundred and twenty-four.	The whole act, except sections 107 to 127 inclusive.
4 Geo. 4. c. 94	Duties on Spirits Act 1823	An Act to grant certain Duties of Excise upon Spirits distilled from Corn or Grain in Scotland and Ireland, and upon Licences for Stills for making such Spirits, and to provide for the better collecting and securing such Duties, and for the warehousing of such Spirits without Payment of Duty.	The whole act, except section 133. (Note: This was the remaining unrepealed part of the act)
6 Geo. 4. c. 58	Duties on Beer, Malt, etc. Act 1825	An Act for providing equivalent Rates of Excise Duties, Allowances, and Drawbacks on Beer and Malt, and on Spirits made in Scotland or Ireland, according to the Measure of the new Imperial Standard Gallon.	The whole act. (Note: This repeal was qualified by section 2 of the Excise Duties Act 1862 (25 & 26 Vict. c. 84). The whole act was repealed by section 49 of the Inland Revenue Act 1880 (43 & 44 Vict. c. 20).)
6 Geo. 4. c. 80	Duties on Spirits Act 1825	An Act to repeal the Duties payable in respect of Spirits distilled in England, and of Licences for distilling, rectifying, or compounding such Spirits, and for the Sale of Spirits, and to impose other Duties in lieu thereof; and to provide other Regulations for the Collection of the said Duties, and for the Sale of Spirits, and for the warehousing of such Spirits without Payment of Duty for Exportation.	The whole act, except section 145.
9 Geo. 4. c. 45	Distillation of Spirits Act 1828	An Act to amend and to make perpetual, and to extend to the whole of the United Kingdom, certain Provisions contained in several Acts for regulating the Rectification, compounding, dealing in, or retailing of Spirits, and for preventing private Distillation in Scotland, and to provide for the Payment of the Duty on Malt used in making of Spirits from Malt only.	The whole act, except so much of section 2 as relates to the Prevention of private Distillation in Scotland.
11 Geo. 4 & 1 Will. 4. c. 49	Excise Act 1830	An Act to impose additional Duties of Excise on Spirits.	The whole act. (Note: This repeal was qualified by section 2 of the Excise Duties Act 1862 (25 & 26 Vict. c. 84). The whole act was repealed by section 1 of, and the schedule to, the Statute Law Revision Act 1875 (38 & 39 Vict. c. 66).)
2 Will. 4. c. 29	Spirits, (Scotland): Spirits (Ireland) Act 1832	An Act to reduce the Allowance on Spirits made from Malt only in Scotland and Ireland.	The whole act. (Note: This repeal was qualified by section 2 of the Excise Duties Act 1862 (25 & 26 Vict. c. 84). The whole act was repealed by section 1 of, and the schedule to, the Statute Law Revision Act 1874 (37 & 38 Vict. c. 35)).)
2 & 3 Will. 4. c. 74	Spirits Act 1832	An Act to permit the Distillation of Spirits from Mangel Wurzel.	The whole act.
4 & 5 Will. 4. c. 75	Excise Act 1834	An Act to repeal the Duties on Spirits made in Ireland, and to impose other Duties in lieu thereof, and to impose additional Duties on Licences to Retailers of Spirits in the United Kingdom.	The whole act, except sections 9 and 10.
6 & 7 Will. 4. c. 72	Countervailing Duties on Spirit Mixtures, etc. Act 1836	An Act to impose countervailing Duties of Excise on Mixtures, Compounds, Preparations, and Commodities made from or with Spirits removed from Ireland to England or Scotland, or from Scotland to England; and to grant countervailing Drawbacks on the Removal of the same, to repeal the additional Duties of Excise on Licences to Retailers of Spirits in the United Kingdom, and to alter the Laws relating to Distillers and Retailers of Spirits.	The whole act.
5 Vict. Sess. 2. c. 15	Duties on Spirits, etc. Act 1842	An Act to impose an additional Duty on Spirits, and to repeal the Allowance on Spirits made from Malt only in Ireland.	The whole act. (Note: This repeal was qualified by section 2 of the Excise Duties Act 1862 (25 & 26 Vict. c. 84). The whole act was repealed by section 1 of, and the schedule to, the Statute Law Revision Act 1874 (No. 2) (37 & 38 Vict. c. 96).)
5 Vict. Sess. 2. c. 25	Duties on Spirit Mixtures, etc. Act 1842	An Act to repeal the present and impose and allow new countervailing Duties and Drawbacks of Excise on Mixtures and Preparations made with Spirits when removed from or into England, Scotland, or Ireland respectively, and to suspend for a limited Time so much of an Act of the present Session as repeals the Allowance on Spirits made from Malt only in Ireland.	The whole act, except section 4.
6 & 7 Vict. c. 49	Duties on Spirits Act 1843	An Act to reduce the Duty on Spirits in Ireland, and to impose other countervailing Duties and Drawbacks on the Removal of certain Mixtures and Compounds between Ireland, England, and Scotland respectively.	The whole act.
8 & 9 Vict. c. 65	Duties on Spirits Act 1845	An Act to determine the countervailing Duties payable on Spirits of the Nature of plain British Spirits, the Manufacture of Guernsey, Jersey, Alderney, or Sark, imported into the United Kingdom, and to prohibit the Importation of rectified or compound Spirits from the said Islands.	The whole act.
10 & 11 Vict. c. 6	Distillation of Spirits from Sugar Act 1847	An Act to further encourage the Distillation of Spirits from Sugar in the United Kingdom.	The whole act.
11 & 12 Vict. c. 100	Distillation of Spirits from Sugar, etc. Act 1848	An Act to permit the Distillation of Spirits from Sugar, Molasses, and Treacle in the United Kingdom.	The whole act.
11 & 12 Vict. c. 121	Liqueur Act 1848	An Act to alter the Laws and Regulations of Excise respecting the Survey of Dealers in and Retailers of Spirits, and respecting the Sale and Removal of Spirits by Permit from the Stock of such Traders, and respecting the Distribution of Penalties and Forfeitures recovered under the Laws of Excise.	The whole act, except sections 9, 10, 11, 18, and 28.
11 & 12 Vict. c. 122	Bonded Warehouses Act 1848	An Act to amend the Laws respecting the warehousing of British Spirits in England, Scotland, and Ireland respectively, and to permit Spirits made from Malt only, and Spirits made from Malt and other Grain, and rectified Spirits to be exported on Drawback from any Part of the United Kingdom, and respecting certain Spirit Mixtures and Regulations from Customs Warehouses.	The whole act, except section 26.
16 & 17 Vict. c. 37	Duties on Spirits, etc. Act 1853	An Act to impose additional Duties on Spirits in Scotland and Ireland, and to alter the countervailing Duties on Spirits the Manufacture of Guernsey, Jersey, Alderney, or Sark imported into Scotland or Ireland, and the countervailing Duties and Drawbacks on the Removal of certain Mixtures and Compounds between Scotland, Ireland, and England respectively, and to amend the Laws relating to the collecting and securing the Duties of Excise upon Spirits.	The whole act.
17 & 18 Vict. c. 27	Excise Act 1854	An Act for granting certain additional Rates and Duties of Excise.	The whole act, except section 8.
18 Vict. c. 22	Excise Duties Act 1855	An Act for granting certain additional Rates and Duties of Excise.	The whole act.
18 & 19 Vict. c. 94	Excise Act 1855	An Act to impose increased Rates of Duty of Excise on Spirits distilled in the United Kingdom, to allow Malt, Sugar, and Molasses to be used Duty-free in the distilling of Spirits, in lieu of Allowances and Drawbacks on such Spirits, Sugar, and Molasses respectively, and to amend the Laws relating to the Duties of Excise.	Sections 1, 2, 3, 4, 9, 10, 28, 30, 31, 33 and 34.
19 & 20 Vict. c. 51	Use of Rice in Distillation Act 1856	An Act to permit the Use of Rice in the Distillation of Spirits.	The whole act.
21 & 22 Vict. c. 15	Excise Act 1858	An Act for granting certain additional Rates and Duties of Excise.	The whole act.

== Subsequent developments ==
Excise Duties Act 1862
- Act of Parliament
- Parliament of the United Kingdom
- Long title: An Act to continue the Duties of Excise on Sugar made in the United Kingdom, and to amend the Laws relating to the Duties of Excise.
- Citation: 25 & 26 Vict. c. 84
- Territorial extent: United Kingdom

Dates
- Royal assent: 7 August 1862
- Commencement: 7 August 1872 (Note: The Acts of Parliament (Commencement) Act 1793.)
- Repealed: 8 June 1893

Other legislation
- Amends: Spirits Act 1860
- Repealed by: Statute Law Revision Act 1893

Status: Repealed

Text of statute as originally enacted

Section 2 of the Excise Duties Act 1862 (25 & 26 Vict. c. 84) clarified that the 1860 act should not be construed as having repealed or affected any excise duties other than those on spirits, and that all other excise duties and their associated collection regulations remained in full force.

This led to several acts repealed by this act to be repealed again for the avoidance of doubt by subsequent acts and statute law revision acts, including:

- The Statute Law Revision Act 1871 (34 & 35 Vict. c. 116)
- The Statute Law Revision Act 1873 (36 & 37 Vict. c. 91)
- The Statute Law Revision Act 1874 (37 & 38 Vict. c. 35)
- The Statute Law Revision Act 1874 (No. 2) (37 & 38 Vict. c. 96)
- The Statute Law Revision Act 1875 (38 & 39 Vict. c. 66)
- The Inland Revenue Act 1880 (43 & 44 Vict. c. 20)

The whole act was repealed by section 164 of, and the fifth schedule to, the Spirits Act 1880 (43 & 44 Vict. c. 24), which came into operation on 1 January 1881.
