= Customs and Inland Revenue Act 1874 =

Act of the Parliament of the United Kingdom

Customs and Inland Revenue Act 1874 (Note: Section 1.)
- Act of Parliament
- Parliament of the United Kingdom
- Long title: An Act to grant certain Duties of Customs and Inland Revenue, to repeal and alter other Duties, and to amend the Laws relating to Customs and Inland Revenue.
- Citation: 37 & 38 Vict. c. 16
- Territorial extent: United Kingdom

Dates
- Royal assent: 8 June 1874
- Commencement: 8 June 1874 (Note: The Acts of Parliament (Commencement) Act 1793.)
- Repealed: 25 August 1883

Other legislation
- Amends: See § Repealed enactments
- Repeals/revokes: See § Repealed enactments
- Repealed by: Statute Law Revision Act 1883

Status: Repealed

Text of statute as originally enacted

The Customs and Inland Revenue Act 1874 (37 & 38 Vict. c. 16) was an act of the Parliament of the United Kingdom that granted certain duties of customs and inland revenue, repealed and altered other duties, and amended the laws relating to customs and inland revenue.

== Provisions ==
=== Repealed enactments ===
Section 21 of the act repealed 15 enactments, listed in the schedule to the act.

| Citation | Short title | Description | Extent of repeal |
|---|---|---|---|
| 1 & 2 Geo. 4. c. 22 | Beer Duties Act 1821 | An Act for altering and amending the Laws of Excise for securing the payment of the Duties on Beer and Ale brewed in Great Britain. | Sections 1 and 7. |
| 7 Will. 4 & 1 Vict. c. 57 | Duties on Beetroot Sugar Act 1837 | An Act to impose certain Duties of Excise on Sugar made from Beetroot in the United Kingdom. | The whole act. |
| 3 & 4 Vict. c. 57 | Sugar Duties Act 1840 | An Act to impose Duties of Excise on Sugar manufactured in the United Kingdom. | The whole act. |
| 10 & 11 Vict. c. 5 | Sugar in Brewing Act 1847 | An Act to allow the use of Sugar in the brewing of Beer. | Sections 1 to 5, both inclusive, and Section 12. |
| 13 & 14 Vict. c. 67 | Brewers' Licensing Act 1850 | An Act to reduce the Duty of Excise on Sugar manufactured in the United Kingdom, &c. | Sections 5 and 9. |
| 17 & 18 Vict. c. 30 | Sugar Duties Act 1854 | An Act for granting certain Duties of Excise on Sugar made in the United Kingdom. | Section 1; Sections 2 and 3, so far as respects Duties on Sugar; and Section 7. |
| 19 & 20 Vict. c. 82 | Duty on Racehorses Act 1856 | An Act to repeal and re-impose under new regulations the Duty on Race Horses. | The whole act. |
| 20 Vict. c. 16 | Duty on Racehorses Act 1857 | An Act to amend an Act of the last Session of Parliament for repealing and re-imposing under new regulations the Duty on Race Horses. | The whole act. |
| 23 & 24 Vict. c. 114 | Spirits Act 1860 | An Act to reduce into one Act and to amend the Excise Regulations relating to the distilling, rectifying, and dealing in Spirits. | Sections 53 to 60, both inclusive; Sections 61, 62, and 63, so far as they relate to Sugar, Molasses, and Treacle; and Section 94, so far as it relates to Sugar and Molasses. |
| 24 & 25 Vict. c. 91 | Revenue (No. 2) Act 1861 | An Act to amend the Laws relating to the Inland Revenue. | Section 15. |
| 31 & 32 Vict. c. 124 | Inland Revenue Act 1868 | An Act to amend the Laws relating to the Inland Revenue. | Section 3. |
| 32 & 33 Vict. c. 14 | Revenue Act 1869 | An Act to grant certain Duties of Customs and Inland Revenue, &c. | The provisions numbered (8) to (12), inclusive of Section 19, and so much of the Act as relates to Duties and Licenses for Horses or Mules or Horse Dealers. |
| 33 & 34 Vict. c. 32 | Customs and Inland Revenue Act 1870 | An Act to grant certain Duties of Customs and Inland Revenue, &c. | Section 7, the proviso to Section 9, Sections 10 and 11, and Schedule B. |
| 34 & 35 Vict. c. 103 | House Tax Act 1871 | An Act to amend the Law relating to the Customs and Inland Revenue. | Sections 24 and 25. |
| 36 & 37 Vict. c. 18 | Customs and Inland Revenue Act 1873 | An Act to grant certain Duties of Customs and Inland Revenue, and to alter other Duties. | Section 3 and Schedule B. |

== Subsequent developments ==
The whole act was repealed by section 1 of, and the schedule to, the Statute Law Revision Act 1883 (46 & 47 Vict. c. 39), which came into force on 25 August 1883.
