= List of acts of the Parliament of the United Kingdom from 1874 =

This is a complete list of acts of the Parliament of the United Kingdom for the year 1874.

Note that the first parliament of the United Kingdom was held in 1801; parliaments between 1707 and 1800 were either parliaments of Great Britain or of Ireland). For acts passed up until 1707, see the list of acts of the Parliament of England and the list of acts of the Parliament of Scotland. For acts passed from 1707 to 1800, see the list of acts of the Parliament of Great Britain. See also the list of acts of the Parliament of Ireland.

For acts of the devolved parliaments and assemblies in the United Kingdom, see the list of acts of the Scottish Parliament, the list of acts of the Northern Ireland Assembly, and the list of acts and measures of Senedd Cymru; see also the list of acts of the Parliament of Northern Ireland.

The number shown after each act's title is its chapter number. Acts passed before 1963 are cited using this number, preceded by the year(s) of the reign during which the relevant parliamentary session was held; thus the Union with Ireland Act 1800 is cited as "39 & 40 Geo. 3 c. 67", meaning the 67th act passed during the session that started in the 39th year of the reign of George III and which finished in the 40th year of that reign. Note that the modern convention is to use Arabic numerals in citations (thus "41 Geo. 3" rather than "41 Geo. III"). Acts of the last session of the Parliament of Great Britain and the first session of the Parliament of the United Kingdom are both cited as "41 Geo. 3".

Some of these acts have a short title. Some of these acts have never had a short title. Some of these acts have a short title given to them by later acts, such as by the Short Titles Act 1896.

== 37 & 38 Vict. ==
The first session of the 21st Parliament of the United Kingdom, which met from 5 March 1874 until 7 August 1874.

=== Public general acts ===
Short title	Citation	Royal assent
Long title
Consolidated Fund (£1,422,797 14s. 6d.) Act or the Supply Act 1874 (repealed)	37 & 38 Vict. c. 1	28 March 1874
An Act to apply the sum of one million four hundred and twenty-two thousand seven hundred and ninety-seven pounds fourteen shillings and sixpence out of the Consolidated Fund to the service of the years ending the thirty-first day of March one thousand eight hundred and seventy-three and one thousand eight hundred and seventy-four. (Repealed by Statute Law Revision Act 1883 (46 & 47 Vict. c. 39))
Consolidated Fund (£7,000,000) Act or the Supply Act 1874 (repealed)	37 & 38 Vict. c. 2	30 March 1874
An Act to apply the sum of seven million pounds out of the Consolidated Fund to the service of the year ending the thirty-first day of March one thousand eight hundred and seventy-five. (Repealed by Statute Law Revision Act 1883 (46 & 47 Vict. c. 39))
East India Loan Act 1874 (repealed)	37 & 38 Vict. c. 3	30 March 1874
An Act to enable the Secretary of State in Council of India to raise Money in the United Kingdom for the Service of the Government of India. (Repealed by East India Loans Act 1937 (1 Edw. 8 & 1 Geo. 6. c. 14))
Mutiny Act 1874 (repealed)	37 & 38 Vict. c. 4	24 April 1874
An Act for punishing Mutiny and Desertion, and for the better payment of the Army and their Quarters. (Repealed by Statute Law Revision Act 1883 (46 & 47 Vict. c. 39))
Marine Mutiny Act 1874 (repealed)	37 & 38 Vict. c. 5	24 April 1874
An Act for the Regulation of Her Majesty's Royal Marine Forces while on shore. (Repealed by Statute Law Revision Act 1883 (46 & 47 Vict. c. 39))
Cattle Disease (Ireland) Acts Amendment Act 1874 (repealed)	37 & 38 Vict. c. 6	21 May 1874
An Act to amend the Acts relating to Cattle Disease in Ireland. (Repealed by Contagious Diseases (Animals) Act 1878 (41 & 42 Vict. c. 74))
Middlesex Sessions Act 1874 (repealed)	37 & 38 Vict. c. 7	21 May 1874
An Act to amend the Law respecting the payment of the Assistant Judge of the Court of the Sessions of the Peace for the county of Middlesex, and his deputy, and the Chairman of the Second Court at such Sessions. (Repealed by Statute Law Revision Act 1898 (61 & 62 Vict. c. 22))
Isle of Man Harbours Act 1874 (repealed)	37 & 38 Vict. c. 8	21 May 1874
An Act to make provision for the taking of Harbour Dues in the Isle of Man. (Repealed by Harbours (Isle of Man) Act 1961 (An Act of Tynwald))
Public Works Loan (School Loans) Act 1874 (repealed)	37 & 38 Vict. c. 9	21 May 1874
An Act to authorise an Advance out of the Consolidated Fund of the United Kingdom to the Public Works Loan Commissioners, for enabling them to make Loans to School Boards in pursuance of the Elementary Education Act, 1873. (Note: Elementary Education Act 1873 (36 & 37 Vict. c. 86)) (Repealed by Statute Law Revision Act 1883 (46 & 47 Vict. c. 39))
Consolidated Fund (£13,000,000) Act or the Supply Act 1874 (repealed)	37 & 38 Vict. c. 10	21 May 1874
An Act to apply the sum of thirteen million pounds out of the Consolidated Fund to the service of the year ending the thirty-first day of March one thousand eight hundred and seventy-five. (Repealed by Statute Law Revision Act 1883 (46 & 47 Vict. c. 39))
Game Birds (Ireland) Act 1874 (repealed)	37 & 38 Vict. c. 11	21 May 1874
An Act for altering the shooting season for Grouse and certain other Game Birds in Ireland. (Repealed by Game Law Amendment Act (Northern Ireland) 1951 (c. 4 (N.I.)))
East India Annuity Funds Act 1874 (repealed)	37 & 38 Vict. c. 12	8 June 1874
An Act to make provision for the transfer of the assets and liabilities of the Bengal and Madras Civil Service Annuity Funds, and the Annuity Branch of the Bombay Civil Fund, to the Secretary of State for India in Council. (Repealed by Statute Law (Repeals) Act 1971 (c. 52))
Bishop of Calcutta Act 1874 (repealed)	37 & 38 Vict. c. 13	8 June 1874
An Act to extend to the present Bishop of Calcutta the Regulations made by Her Majesty as to the leave of absence of Indian Bishops. (Repealed by Statute Law Revision Act 1883 (46 & 47 Vict. c. 39))
Marriages Confirmation (Pooley Bridge) Act 1874 (repealed)	37 & 38 Vict. c. 14	8 June 1874
An Act to render valid Marriages heretofore solemnized in the Chapel of Ease called "Saint Paul's Church at Pooley Bridge," in the parish of Barton in the county of Westmorland. (Repealed by Statute Law (Repeals) Act 1977 (c. 18))
Betting Act 1874 (repealed)	37 & 38 Vict. c. 15	8 June 1874
An Act to amend the Act of sixteenth and seventeenth Victoria, chapter one hundred and nineteen, intituled "An Act for the Suppression of Betting Houses." (Note: Betting Act 1853 (16 & 17 Vict. c. 119)) (Repealed for England and Wales and Scotland by Betting and Gaming Act 1960 (8 & 9 Eliz. 2. c. 60) and for Northern Ireland by Betting, Gaming, Lotteries and Amusements (Northern Ireland) Order 1985 (SI 1985/1204 (N.I. 11)))
Customs and Inland Revenue Act 1874 (repealed)	37 & 38 Vict. c. 16	8 June 1874
An Act to grant certain Duties of Customs and Inland Revenue, to repeal and alter other Duties, and to amend the Laws relating to Customs and Inland Revenue. (Repealed by Customs Consolidation Act 1876 (39 & 40 Vict. c. 36) and Statute Law Revision Act 1883 (46 & 47 Vict. c. 39))
Marriages Confirmation (Bentley) Act 1874 (repealed)	37 & 38 Vict. c. 17	8 June 1874
An Act to render valid Marriages heretofore solemnized in the Chapel of Ease called Saint John the Evangelist, at Bentley, in the parish of Shustock in the county of Warwick. (Repealed by Statute Law (Repeals) Act 1977 (c. 18))
Land Tax Commissioners (Appointment) Act 1874 (repealed)	37 & 38 Vict. c. 18	30 June 1874
An Act to appoint additional Commissioners for executing the Acts for granting a Land Tax and other rates and taxes. (Repealed by Statute Law Revision Act 1950 (14 Geo. 6. c. 6))
Barrister's Admission, Stamp Duty Act 1874 (repealed)	37 & 38 Vict. c. 19	30 June 1874
An Act to amend "The Stamp Act, 1870," (Note: Stamp Act 1870 (33 & 34 Vict. c. 97)) in regard to the Stamp Duty payable by Advocates in Scotland on admission as Barristers in England or Ireland, and by Barristers in England or Ireland on admission as Advocates in Scotland. (Repealed by Stamp Act 1891 (54 & 55 Vict. c. 39))
Rating Exemptions (Scotland) Act 1874	37 & 38 Vict. c. 20	30 June 1874
An Act to provide for the Exemption of Churches and Chapels in Scotland from Local Rates and Assessment.
Four Courts Marshalsea Discontinuance Act 1874 (repealed)	37 & 38 Vict. c. 21	30 June 1874
An Act for the discontinuance of the Four Courts Marshalsea (Dublin), and the removal of Prisoners therefrom. (Repealed by Statute Law Revision (No. 2) Act 1893 (56 & 57 Vict. c. 54))
Revenue Officers' Disabilities Removal Act 1874 (repealed)	37 & 38 Vict. c. 22	30 June 1874
An Act to relieve Revenue Officers from remaining Electoral Disabilities. (Repealed by Statute Law Revision Act 1883 (46 & 47 Vict. c. 39))
Resident Magistrates and Police Commissioners Salaries Act 1874 (repealed)	37 & 38 Vict. c. 23	30 June 1874
An Act to amend the Acts regulating the Salaries of Resident Magistrates in Ireland and the Salaries of the Chief Commissioner and Assistant Commissioner of Police of the Police District of Dublin Metropolis. (Repealed by Statute Law Revision Act (Northern Ireland) 1954 (c. 35 (N.I.)))
Harbour of Colombo Loan Act 1874 (repealed)	37 & 38 Vict. c. 24	30 June 1874
An Act to empower the Public Works Loan Commissioners to advance a sum of money, by way of loan, for the improvement of the Harbour of Colombo in the colony of Ceylon. (Repealed by Statute Law Revision Act 1883 (46 & 47 Vict. c. 39), Statute Law Revision (No. 2) Act 1893 (56 & 57 Vict. c. 54) and Statute Law Revision Act 1950 (14 Geo. 6. c. 6))
Herring Fishery Barrels Act 1874 (repealed)	37 & 38 Vict. c. 25	30 June 1874
An Act to remove the Restrictions contained in the British White Herring Fishery Acts in regard to the use of Fir Wood for Herring Barrels. (Repealed by Statute Law Revision (No. 2) Act 1893 (56 & 57 Vict. c. 54))
Canadian Stock Stamp Act 1874 (repealed)	37 & 38 Vict. c. 26	30 June 1874
An Act to make provision respecting the Stamp Duty on Transfers of Stock of the Government of Canada. (Repealed by Stamp Act 1891 (54 & 55 Vict. c. 39))
Courts (Colonial) Jurisdiction Act 1874	37 & 38 Vict. c. 27	30 June 1874
An Act to regulate the Sentences imposed by Colonial Courts where jurisdiction to try is conferred by Imperial Acts.
Juries (Ireland) Act 1874 (repealed)	37 & 38 Vict. c. 28	30 June 1874
An Act to further amend the Law relating to Juries in Ireland. (Repealed by Statute Law Revision Act 1883 (46 & 47 Vict. c. 39))
Militia Law Amendment Act 1874 (repealed)	37 & 38 Vict. c. 29	30 June 1874
An Act to amend the Law relating to the Militia. (Repealed by Militia Act 1882 (45 & 46 Vict. c. 49))
Holyhead Old Harbour Road Act 1874	37 & 38 Vict. c. 30	30 June 1874
An Act to transfer parts of the Holyhead Old Harbour Road from the Board of Trade to the Local Board of Health of the town of Holyhead; and for other purposes.
Conjugal Rights (Scotland) Amendment Act 1874 (repealed)	37 & 38 Vict. c. 31	16 July 1874
An Act to amend the Conjugal Rights (Scotland) Amendment Act, 1861. (Note: Conjugal Rights (Scotland) Amendment Act 1861 (24 & 25 Vict. c. 86)) (Repealed by Law Reform (Husband and Wife) (Scotland) Act 1984 (c. 15))
Drainage and Improvement of Lands Amendment Act (Ireland) 1874 or the Drainage and Improvement of Lands Amendment (Ireland) Act 1874 (repealed)	37 & 38 Vict. c. 32	16 July 1874
An Act to amend "The Drainage and Improvement of Lands Act (Ireland), 1863." (Note: Drainage and Improvement of Lands Act (Ireland) 1863 (26 & 27 Vict. c. 88)) (Repealed by Erne Drainage and Development Act (Northern Ireland) 1950 (c. 15 (N.I.)))
Leases and Sales of Settled Estates Amendment Act 1874 (repealed)	37 & 38 Vict. c. 33	16 July 1874
An Act to extend the Powers of the Leases and Sales of Settled Estates Act. (Note: Settled Estates Act 1856 (19 & 20 Vict. c. 120)) (Repealed by Settled Estates Act 1877 (40 & 41 Vict. c. 18))
Apothecaries Act Amendment Act 1874 (repealed)	37 & 38 Vict. c. 34	16 July 1874
An Act to amend the Act of the fifty-fifth year of King George the Third, chapter one hundred and ninety-four, intituled "An Act for better regulating the Practice of Apothecaries in England and Wales." (Note: Apothecaries Act 1815 (55 Geo. 3. c. 194)) (Repealed by Statute Law (Repeals) Act 1989 (c. 43))
Statute Law Revision Act 1874	37 & 38 Vict. c. 35	16 July 1874
An Act for promoting the Revision of the Statute Law by repealing certain Acts which have ceased to be in force or have become unnecessary.
False Personation Act 1874 (repealed)	37 & 38 Vict. c. 36	30 July 1874
An Act to render Personation, with intent to deprive any Person of Real Estate or other property, Felony. (Repealed for England and Wales and Scotland by Theft Act 1968 (c. 60) and for Northern Ireland by Theft Act (Northern Ireland) 1969 (c. 16 (N.I.)))
Powers of Appointment Act 1874	37 & 38 Vict. c. 37	30 July 1874
An Act to alter and amend the Law as to Appointments under powers not exclusive. (Repealed for England and Wales by Law of Property Act 1925 (15 & 16 Geo. 5. c. 20))
Straits Settlements Offences Act 1874 (repealed)	37 & 38 Vict. c. 38	30 July 1874
An Act to extend the Jurisdiction of Courts of the Colony of the Straits Settlements to certain Crimes and Offences committed out of the Colony. (Repealed by Statute Law (Repeals) Act 1973 (c. 39))
Elementary Education (Wenlock) Act 1874 (repealed)	37 & 38 Vict. c. 39	30 July 1874
An Act to provide for the exception of the Borough of Wenlock from the category of boroughs under the "Elementary Education Act, 1870." (Note: Elementary Education Act 1870 (33 & 34 Vict. c. 75)) (Repealed by Education Act 1921 (11 & 12 Geo. 5. c. 51))
Board of Trade Arbitrations, &c. Act 1874	37 & 38 Vict. c. 40	30 July 1874
An Act to amend the powers of the Board of Trade with respect to inquiries, arbitrations, appointments, and other matters under special Acts, and to amend the Regulation of Railways Act 1873, (Note: Regulation of Railways Act 1873 (36 & 37 Vict. c. 48)) so far as regards the reference of differences to the Railway Commissioners in lieu of Arbitrators.
Colonial Attorneys Relief Act 1874 or the Colonial Attornies Relief Act 1874 (repealed)	37 & 38 Vict. c. 41	30 July 1874
An Act to amend "The Colonial Attornies Relief Act." (Note: Colonial Attorneys Relief Act 1857 (20 & 21 Vict. c. 39)) (Repealed by Colonial Solicitors Act 1900 (63 & 64 Vict. c. 14))
Building Societies Act 1874	37 & 38 Vict. c. 42	30 July 1874
An Act to consolidate and amend the Laws relating to Building Societies.
Alkali Act 1874 or the Alkali Act (1863) Amendment Act 1874 (repealed)	37 & 38 Vict. c. 43	30 July 1874
An Act to amend the Alkali Act, 1863. (Note: Alkali Act 1863 (26 & 27 Vict. c. 124)) (Repealed by Alkali, &c. Works Regulation Act 1881 (44 & 45 Vict. c. 37))
Factory Act 1874 or the Factories (Health of Women, &c.) Act 1874 (repealed)	37 & 38 Vict. c. 44	30 July 1874
An Act to make better provision for improving the health of women, young persons, and children employed in manufactures, and the education of such children, and otherwise to amend the Factory Acts. (Repealed by Factory and Workshop Act 1878 (41 & 42 Vict. c. 16))
County of Hertford and Liberty of St. Alban Act 1874 (repealed)	37 & 38 Vict. c. 45	30 July 1874
An Act for altering the Boundaries between the Liberty of St. Alban and the rest of the County of Hertford; and for making better provision for the Transaction of County Business, and the Administration of Justice at Quarter Sessions in that County. (Repealed by Local Authorities etc. (Miscellaneous Provision) (No. 4) Order 1974 (SI 1974/1351))
Customs (Isle of Man) Tariff Act 1874 (repealed)	37 & 38 Vict. c. 46	30 July 1874
An Act to consolidate and amend the Duties of Customs in the Isle of Man. (Repealed by Customs and Excise Legislation (Application) Order 1976 (G.C. 1/76) and Customs and Excise Act (Application) Order 1979 (G.C. 38/79))
Prisons Authorities Act 1874 (repealed)	37 & 38 Vict. c. 47	30 July 1874
An Act to extend the Powers of Prison Authorities in relation to Industrial and Reformatory Schools, and for other purposes relating thereto. (Repealed by Children Act 1908 (8 Edw. 7. c. 67))
Hosiery Manufacture (Wages) Act 1874 (repealed)	37 & 38 Vict. c. 48	30 July 1874
An Act to provide for the payment of Wages without Stoppages in the Hosiery Manufacture. (Repealed by Wages Act 1986 (c. 48))
Licensing Act 1874 (repealed)	37 & 38 Vict. c. 49	30 July 1874
An Act to amend the Laws relating to the sale and consumption of Intoxicating Liquors. (Repealed by Statute Law Revision Act 1959 (7 & 8 Eliz. 2. c. 68))
Married Women's Property Act (1870) Amendment Act 1874 (repealed)	37 & 38 Vict. c. 50	30 July 1874
An Act to amend the Married Women's Property Act (1870). (Note: Married Women's Property Act 1870 (33 & 34 Vict. c. 93)) (Repealed by Married Women's Property Act 1882 (45 & 46 Vict. c. 75))
Chain Cables and Anchors Act 1874 (repealed)	37 & 38 Vict. c. 51	30 July 1874
An Act to amend the Law respecting the Proving and Sale of Chain Cables and Anchors. (Repealed by Anchors and Chain Cables Act 1899 (62 & 63 Vict. c. 23))
Mersey Collisions Act 1874 (repealed)	37 & 38 Vict. c. 52	30 July 1874
An Act to make regulations for preventing Collisions in the Sea Channels leading to the River Mersey. (Repealed by Mersey Channels Act 1897 (60 & 61 Vict. c. 21))
Revising Barristers Act 1874 (repealed)	37 & 38 Vict. c. 53	30 July 1874
An Act to amend the Law relating to the payment of Revising Barristers. (Repealed by Statute Law Revision Act 1883 (46 & 47 Vict. c. 39), Statute Law Revision Act 1898 (61 & 62 Vict. c. 22) and Representation of the People Act 1918 (7 & 8 Geo. 5. c. 64))
Rating Act 1874 (repealed)	37 & 38 Vict. c. 54	7 August 1874
An Act to amend the Law respecting the Liability and Valuation of certain Property for the purpose of Rates. (Repealed by General Rate Act 1967 (c. 9))
Hertford College Act 1874	37 & 38 Vict. c. 55	7 August 1874
An Act for dissolving Magdalen Hall, in the University of Oxford, and for incorporating the Principal, Fellows, and Scholars of Hertford College; and for vesting in such College the lands and other property now held in trust for the benefit of Magdalen Hall.
Appropriation Act 1874 (repealed)	37 & 38 Vict. c. 56	7 August 1874
An Act to apply a sum out of the Consolidated Fund to the service of the year ending the thirty-first day of March one thousand eight hundred and seventy-five, and to appropriate the Supplies granted in this Session of Parliament. (Repealed by Statute Law Revision Act 1883 (46 & 47 Vict. c. 39))
Real Property Limitation Act 1874 (repealed)	37 & 38 Vict. c. 57	7 August 1874
An Act for the further Limitation of Actions and Suits relating to Real Property. (Repealed for England and Wales by Limitation Act 1939 (2 & 3 Geo. 6. c. 21) and for Northern Ireland by Statute of Limitations Act (Northern Ireland) 1958 (c. 10 (N.I.)))
Police (Expenses) Act 1874 (repealed)	37 & 38 Vict. c. 58	7 August 1874
An Act to make further provision respecting the contribution out of moneys provided by Parliament towards the expenses of the Police Force in the Metropolitan Police District, and elsewhere in Great Britain. (Repealed by Statute Law Revision Act 1883 (46 & 47 Vict. c. 39))
Working Men's Dwellings Act 1874 (repealed)	37 & 38 Vict. c. 59	7 August 1874
An Act to facilitate the erection of Dwellings for Working Men on land belonging to Municipal Corporations. (Repealed by Municipal Corporations Act 1882 (45 & 46 Vict. c. 50))
Shannon Act 1874 (repealed)	37 & 38 Vict. c. 60	7 August 1874
An Act to amend and enlarge the powers of the Acts relating to the Navigation of the River Shannon; and for other purposes relating thereto. (Repealed by Statute Law Revision Act 1883 (46 & 47 Vict. c. 39))
Royal (late Indian) Ordnance Corps Act 1874 (repealed)	37 & 38 Vict. c. 61	7 August 1874
An Act for granting Compensation to Officers of the Royal (late Indian) Ordnance Corps. (Repealed by Statute Law Revision Act 1883 (46 & 47 Vict. c. 39) and Statute Law Revision Act 1950 (14 Geo. 6. c. 6))
Infants Relief Act 1874 (repealed)	37 & 38 Vict. c. 62	7 August 1874
An Act to amend the Law as to the Contracts of Infants. (Repealed for England and Wales by Minors' Contracts Act 1987 (c. 13) and for Northern Ireland by Minors' Contracts (Northern Ireland) Order 1988 (SI 1988/930 (N.I. 9)))
Archdeaconries and Rural Deaneries Act 1874 (repealed)	37 & 38 Vict. c. 63	7 August 1874
An Act to facilitate the re-arrangement of the Boundaries of Archdeaconries and Rural Deaneries. (Repealed by Pastoral Measure 1968 (No. 1) and Statute Law (Repeals) Act 1974 (c. 22))
Evidence Further Amendment (Scotland) Act 1874	37 & 38 Vict. c. 64	7 August 1874
An Act to further alter and amend the Law of Evidence in Scotland, and to provide for the recording, by means of Short-hand Writing, of Evidence in Civil Causes in Sheriff Courts in Scotland.
Annuity to Prince Leopold Act 1874 (repealed)	37 & 38 Vict. c. 65	7 August 1874
An Act to enable Her Majesty to provide for the Support and Maintenance of His Royal Highness Prince Leopold George Duncan Albert on his coming of age. (Repealed by Statute Law Revision Act 1894 (57 & 58 Vict. c. 56))
Civil Bill Courts (Ireland) Act 1874 (repealed)	37 & 38 Vict. c. 66	7 August 1874
An Act to enlarge the Jurisdiction of the Civil Bill Courts in Ireland in respect to the recovery of Balances due on partnership Accounts, and in respect of Actions involving Questions of Title to corporeal and incorporeal Hereditaments. (Repealed by County Courts Act (Northern Ireland) 1959 (c. 25 (N.I.)) and Northern Ireland (Remittal and Removal of Proceedings) Order 1971 (SI 1971/875))
Slaughter-houses, &c. (Metropolis) Act 1874 (repealed)	37 & 38 Vict. c. 67	7 August 1874
An Act to regulate and otherwise deal with Slaughterhouses and certain other Businesses in the Metropolis. (Repealed by Public Health (London) Act 1891 (54 & 55 Vict. c. 76))
Attorneys and Solicitors Act 1874 (repealed)	37 & 38 Vict. c. 68	7 August 1874
An Act to amend the Law relating to Attorneys and Solicitors. (Repealed by Solicitors Act 1932 (22 & 23 Geo. 5. c. 37))
Licensing Act (Ireland) 1874 or the Licensing (Ireland) Act 1874 (repealed)	37 & 38 Vict. c. 69	7 August 1874
An Act to amend the Laws relating to the Sale and Consumption of Intoxicating Liquors in Ireland. (Repealed by Licensing Act (Northern Ireland) 1971 (c. 13 (N.I.)))
Valuation (Ireland) Amendment Act 1874 (repealed)	37 & 38 Vict. c. 70	7 August 1874
An Act to amend the Law relating to the Valuation of Rateable Property in Ireland. (Repealed by Statute Law Revision Act 1883 (46 & 47 Vict. c. 39), Statute Law Revision (No. 2) Act 1893 (56 & 57 Vict. c. 54), Statute Law Revision Act 1898 (61 & 62 Vict. c. 22), Local Government (Ireland) Act 1898 (61 & 62 Vict. c. 37) and Valuation Acts Amendment Act (Northern Ireland) 1953 (c. 10 (N.I.)))
Lough Corrib Navigation Act 1874	37 & 38 Vict. c. 71	7 August 1874
An Act to authorise “The Lough Corrib Navigation Trustees” to dispose of part of the Navigation in the district of Loughs Corrib, Mask, and Curra.
Fines Act (Ireland) 1851 Amendment Act 1874	37 & 38 Vict. c. 72	7 August 1874
An Act to explain and amend the Fines Act (Ireland), 1851, (Note: Fines Act (Ireland) 1851 (14 & 15 Vict. c. 90)) and for other purposes relating thereto.
Post Office Savings Banks Act 1874 or the Post Office Savings Bank Act 1874 (repealed)	37 & 38 Vict. c. 73	7 August 1874
An Act to amend the Law relating to the Payment to and Repayment by the Commissioners for the Reduction of the National Debt of Moneys received in and to the account relating to the Post Office Savings Bank. (Repealed by Post Office Savings Bank Act 1954 (2 & 3 Eliz. 2. c. 62))
Private Lunatic Asylums (Ireland) Act 1874 (repealed)	37 & 38 Vict. c. 74	7 August 1874
An Act to amend the Law respecting certain Receipts and Expenses connected with Private Lunatic Asylums in Ireland. (Repealed by Statute Law Revision Act 1883 (46 & 47 Vict. c. 39), Statute Law Revision (No. 2) Act 1893 (56 & 57 Vict. c. 54), Statute Law Revision Act 1898 (61 & 62 Vict. c. 22) and Mental Health Act (Northern Ireland) 1948 (c. 7 (N.I.)))
Vaccination Act 1874 (repealed)	37 & 38 Vict. c. 75	7 August 1874
An Act to explain the Vaccination Act, 1871. (Note: Vaccination Act 1871 (34 & 35 Vict. c. 98)) (Repealed by National Health Service Act 1946 (9 & 10 Geo. 6. c. 81))
Expiring Laws Continuance Act 1874 (repealed)	37 & 38 Vict. c. 76	7 August 1874
An Act to continue various expiring Laws. (Repealed by Statute Law Revision Act 1883 (46 & 47 Vict. c. 39))
Colonial Clergy Act 1874	37 & 38 Vict. c. 77	7 August 1874
An Act respecting Colonial and certain other Clergy.
Vendor and Purchaser Act 1874	37 & 38 Vict. c. 78	7 August 1874
An Act to amend the Law of Vendor and Purchaser, and further to simplify Title to Land. (Repealed for England and Wales by Law of Property Act 1925 (15 & 16 Geo. 5. c. 20))
Foyle College Act 1874 (repealed)	37 & 38 Vict. c. 79	7 August 1874
An Act for the better management and regulation of Foyle College in the city of Londonderry, and for vesting in the governing body of such College the present schoolhouse and premises belonging to such College, and for vesting the right of appointment of head-master of such College in the Bishop of Derry and Raphoe and the Governor of the Honourable the Irish Society. (Repealed by Foyle College Act 1896 (59 & 60 Vict. c. cxxxi))
Constabulary (Ireland) Act 1874 or the Irish Constabulary Act 1874 or the Royal Irish Constabulary Act 1874 (repealed)	37 & 38 Vict. c. 80	7 August 1874
An Act to amend the Laws relating to the Royal Irish Constabulary. (Repealed by Police (Northern Ireland) Act 1998 (c. 32))
Great Seal (Offices) Act 1874	37 & 38 Vict. c. 81	7 August 1874
An Act to provide for the abolition of certain offices (Note: Messenger of the Great Seal, Clerk of the Petty Bag, and Clerk of the Patents.) connected with the Great Seal, and to make better provision respecting the office of the Clerk of the Crown in Chancery.
Church Patronage (Scotland) Act 1874	37 & 38 Vict. c. 82	7 August 1874
An Act to alter and amend the laws relating to the Appointment of Ministers to Parishes in Scotland.
Supreme Court of Judicature (Commencement) Act 1874 (repealed)	37 & 38 Vict. c. 83	7 August 1874
An Act for delaying the coming into operation of the Supreme Court of Judicature Act, 1873. (Note: Supreme Court of Judicature Act 1873 (36 & 37 Vict. c. 66)) (Repealed by Statute Law Revision (No. 2) Act 1893 (56 & 57 Vict. c. 54))
Works and Public Buildings Act 1874	37 & 38 Vict. c. 84	7 August 1874
An Act to regulate the Incorporation of the Commissioners of Her Majesty’s Works and Public Buildings, and for other purposes relating thereto.
Public Worship Regulation Act 1874 or the Church Discipline Act 1874 (repealed)	37 & 38 Vict. c. 85	7 August 1874
An Act for the better administration of the Laws respecting the regulation of Public Worship. (Repealed by Ecclesiastical Jurisdiction Measure 1963 (No. 1))
Irish Reproductive Loan Fund Act 1874 (repealed)	37 & 38 Vict. c. 86	7 August 1874
An Act to amend the Law relating to the Irish Reproductive Loan Fund. (Repealed by Statute Law Revision Act (Northern Ireland) 1954 (c. 35 (N.I.)))
Endowed Schools Act 1874 (repealed)	37 & 38 Vict. c. 87	7 August 1874
An Act to amend the Endowed Schools Acts. (Repealed by Statute Law Revision Act 1883 (46 & 47 Vict. c. 39), Statute Law Revision (No. 2) Act 1893 (56 & 57 Vict. c. 54), Statute Law Revision Act 1898 (61 & 62 Vict. c. 22) and Charities Act 1960 (8 & 9 Eliz. 2. c. 58))
Births and Deaths Registration Act 1874	37 & 38 Vict. c. 88	7 August 1874
An Act to amend the Law relating to the Registration of Births and Deaths in England, and to consolidate the Law respecting the Registration of Births and Deaths at Sea.
Sanitary Law Amendment Act 1874 (repealed)	37 & 38 Vict. c. 89	7 August 1874
An Act to amend and extend the Sanitary Laws. (Repealed by Public Health Act 1875 (38 & 39 Vict. c. 55), Public Health (London) Act 1891 (54 & 55 Vict. c. 76), Public Health Act 1936 (26 Geo. 5 & 1 Edw. 8. c. 49) and Public Health (London) Act 1936 (26 Geo. 5 & 1 Edw. 8. c. 50))
Elementary Education (Orders) Act 1874 (repealed)	37 & 38 Vict. c. 90	7 August 1874
An Act to declare the Validity of Orders of the Education Department, with respect to United School Districts, and to make better Provision with respect to such Orders. (Repealed by Education Act 1902 (2 Edw. 7. c. 42))
Indian Councils Act 1874 (repealed)	37 & 38 Vict. c. 91	7 August 1874
An Act to amend the Law relating to the Council of the Governor-General of India. (Repealed by Government of India Act 1915 (5 & 6 Geo. 5. c. 61))
Alderney Harbour (Transfer) Act 1874 (repealed)	37 & 38 Vict. c. 92	7 August 1874
An Act to provide for the Transfer to the Admiralty and the Secretary of State for the War Department of Alderney Harbour and certain Lands near it. (Repealed by Statute Law (Repeals) Act 1977 (c. 18))
Public Health (Ireland) Act 1874 (repealed)	37 & 38 Vict. c. 93	7 August 1874
An Act to amend the Law relating to Public Health in Ireland. (Repealed by Public Health (Ireland) Act 1878 (41 & 42 Vict. c. 52))
Conveyancing (Scotland) Act 1874	37 & 38 Vict. c. 94	7 August 1874
An Act to amend the law relating to land rights and conveyancing, and to facilitate the transfer of land, in Scotland.
Annual Turnpike Acts Continuance Act 1874 (repealed)	37 & 38 Vict. c. 95	7 August 1874
An Act to continue certain Turnpike Acts in Great Britain, and to repeal certain other Turnpike Acts; and for other purposes connected therewith. (Repealed by Statute Law Revision Act 1898 (61 & 62 Vict. c. 22))
Statute Law Revision Act 1874 (No. 2) or the Statute Law Revision (No. 2) Act 1874 (repealed)	37 & 38 Vict. c. 96	7 August 1874
An Act for promoting the Revision of the Statute Law by repealing certain Enactments which have ceased to be in force or have become unnecessary. (Repealed by Statute Law (Repeals) Act 1998 (c. 43))

=== Local acts ===
Short title	Citation	Royal assent
Long title
Local Government Board's Provisional Orders Confirmation Act 1874	37 & 38 Vict. c. i	21 May 1874
An Act to confirm certain Provisional Orders of the Local Government Board relating to the Districts of Aberystwyth, Carnarvon, Hurst, Nottingham, Penzance, and Tetbury.
	Aberystwyth Order 1874 Provisional Order for dissolving the Aberystwyth Improvement Act (Note: Aberystwyth Improvement Act 1835 (5 & 6 Will. 4. c. xlvi)) District.	
	Carnarvon Order 1874 Provisional Order to enable the Urban Sanitary Authority for the Borough of Carnarvon to put in force the Compulsory Clauses of the Lands Clauses Consolidation Act, 1845. (Note: Lands Clauses Consolidation Act 1845 (8 & 9 Vict. c. 18))	
	Hurst Order 1874 Provisional Order for extending the Local Government District of Hurst, and for prescribing the number of Members of the Local Board.	
	Nottingham Order 1874 Provisional Order to enable the Urban Sanitary Authority for the Borough of Nottingham to put in force the Compulsory Clauses of the Lands Clauses Consolidation Act, 1845.	
	Penzance Order 1874 Provisional Order to enable the Urban Sanitary Authority for the Borough of Penzance to put in force the Compulsory Clauses of the Lands Clauses Consolidation Act, 1845.	
	Tetbury Order 1874 Provisional Order for repealing a Local Act, (Note: Tetbury Improvement Act 1817 (57 Geo. 3. c. ii)) and for the constitution of the Local Government District of Tetbury.	
City of London Police Act 1874	37 & 38 Vict. c. ii	21 May 1874
An Act for making better provision for the payment of Superannuation and other Allowances in the Police Force of the City of London; and for other purposes.
Highland Railway (Additional Capital) Act 1874	37 & 38 Vict. c. iii	21 May 1874
An Act to enable the Highland Railway Company to raise further sums of money.
Southampton Docks Act 1874	37 & 38 Vict. c. iv	21 May 1874
An Act to enable the Southampton Dock Company to raise additional capital.
Newent Railway Act 1874	37 & 38 Vict. c. v	21 May 1874
An Act to authorise the deviation and alteration of the Newent Railway; and for other purposes.
Potteries, Shrewsbury and North Wales Railway Act 1874	37 & 38 Vict. c. vi	21 May 1874
An Act to enable the Potteries, Shrewsbury, and North Wales Railway Company to extend their Railway to Trefonen, and to constitute such Extension Railway a separate Undertaking; and for other purposes.
East London Railway Act 1874	37 & 38 Vict. c. vii	8 June 1874
An Act to confer further powers upon the East London Railway Company with respect to the acquisition of Lands and the raising of Money; and for other purposes.
General Steam Navigation Company Act 1874	37 & 38 Vict. c. viii	8 June 1874
An Act for conferring further powers upon, and for consolidating the Acts relating to, the General Steam Navigation Company.
Northern Assurance Act 1874 (repealed)	37 & 38 Vict. c. ix	8 June 1874
An Act to amend, vary, and extend the powers of the Northern Assurance Company; and for other purposes relating thereto. (Repealed by Northern Assurance Act 1908 (8 Edw. 7. c. lxvi))
Leicester Square Act 1874 (repealed)	37 & 38 Vict. c. x	8 June 1874
An Act for vesting in the Metropolitan Board of Works the Garden or Inclosure in Leicester Square in the county of Middlesex, and for providing for the management thereof; and for other purposes. (Repealed by Local Law (Greater London Council and Inner London Boroughs) Order 1965 (SI 1965/540))
Airdrie and Coatbridge Waterworks (Amendment) Act 1874 (repealed)	37 & 38 Vict. c. xi	8 June 1874
An Act to authorise the Airdrie and Coatbridge Water Company to raise additional capital; and for other purposes. (Repealed by Airdrie, Coatbridge and District Water Board Order Confirmation Act 1923 (13 & 14 Geo. 5. c. li))
Frome Markets Act 1874	37 & 38 Vict. c. xii	8 June 1874
An Act to incorporate a Company for establishing and holding Markets and Fairs, and making Approaches thereto, in the borough and parish of Frome in the county of Somerset; and for other purposes.
Lynn and Hunstanton and West Norfolk Junction Railway Act 1874	37 & 38 Vict. c. xiii	8 June 1874
An Act to authorise the Amalgamation of the Lynn and Hunstanton and West Norfolk Junction Railway Companies; and for other purposes.
Tendring Hundred Railway (Arrangement) Act 1874	37 & 38 Vict. c. xiv	8 June 1874
An Act for authorising the Consolidation of the Two Undertakings of the Tendring Hundred Railway Company and their respective Capitals, and for suspending Legal Proceedings against the said Company; for converting the Mortgage, Bond, and other Debts into Debenture Stock; for regulating the Capital of the Company; and for other purposes.
Leeds, Roundhay Park and Osmondthorpe Junction Railway Act 1874 (repealed)	37 & 38 Vict. c. xv	8 June 1874
An Act to incorporate a company for making the Leeds, Roundhay Park, and Osmondthorpe Junction Railway; and for other purposes. (Repealed by Leeds, Roundhay Park, and Osmondthorpe Junction Railway (Abandonment) Act 1877 (40 & 41 Vict. c. xi))
Railway Clearing House Extension Act 1874 (repealed)	37 & 38 Vict. c. xvi	8 June 1874
An Act for enabling the Railway Clearing Committee to purchase land by compulsion, and to build thereon for the purposes of the Clearing System, to defray the expenses thereof as part of the expenses of the Clearing System, and by borrowing money; and for other purposes. (Repealed by Railway Clearing House Scheme Order 1954 (SI 1954/139))
Gas Orders Confirmation Act 1874	37 & 38 Vict. c. xvii	30 June 1874
An Act for confirming certain Provisional Orders made by the Board of Trade under The Gas and Water Works Facilities Act, 1870, Amendment Act, 1873, (Note: Gas and Water Works Facilities Act 1870 Amendment Act 1873 (36 & 37 Vict. c. 89)) relating to Burnley, Cork, Glasgow, Paisley, Weymouth, Wrexham, and Southport.
	Burnley Corporation Gas Order 1874 Provisional Order to amend the Burnley Borough Improvement Act, 1871, (Note: Burnley Borough Improvement Act 1871 (34 & 35 Vict. c. cliv)) in relation to the maximum price of Gas supplied by the Corporation.	
	Cork Gas Order 1874 Provisional Order to amend the Cork Gas Act, 1868. (Note: Cork Gas Act 1868 (31 & 32 Vict. c. xxxii))	
	Glasgow Corporation Gas Order 1874 Provisional Order to amend the Glasgow Corporation Gas Act, 1869, (Note: Glasgow Corporation Gas Act 1869 (32 & 33 Vict. c. lviii)) in relation to the maximum price of the Gas to be supplied by the Corporation.	
	Paisley Corporation Gas Order 1874 Provisional Order to amend the Paisley Corporation Gas Act, 1870, (Note: Paisley Corporation Gas Act 1870 (33 & 34 Vict. c. xxxv)) in relation to the maximum price of the Gas supplied by the Corporation.	
	Weymouth Gas Order 1874 Provisional Order to amend the Weymouth Consumers Gas Act, 1867. (Note: Weymouth Consumers Gas Act 1867 (30 & 31 Vict. c. ciii))	
	Wrexham Gas Order 1874 Provisional Order to amend the Wrexham Gas Act, 1870. (Note: Wrexham Gas Act 1870 (33 & 34 Vict. c. xii))	
	Southport Corporation Gas Order 1874 Provisional Order to amend the Southport Improvement Act, 1871, (Note: Southport Improvement Act 1871 (34 & 35 Vict. c. cxl)) with respect to the maximum price of gas, and the illuminating power thereof.	
Oyster and Mussel Fisheries Orders Confirmation Act 1874	37 & 38 Vict. c. xviii	30 June 1874
An Act to confirm certain Orders made by the Board of Trade under The Sea Fisheries Act, 1868, (Note: Sea Fisheries Act 1868 (31 & 32 Vict. c. 45)) relating to Menai Straits and Paglesham.
	Menai Straits Fishery Order 1874 Order for the Establishment and Maintenance, by The Anglo-American Oyster Company (Limited), of a Several Oyster and Mussel Fishery in the Menai Straits, in the counties of Anglesea and Caernarvon.	
	Paglesham Fishery Order 1874 Order for the Establishment and Maintenance by John Smith, of Burnham, Essex, Oyster Merchant, of a Several Oyster and Mussel Fishery at Paglesham in the river Roach, in the county of Essex.	
Local Government Board's Provisional Orders Confirmation Act 1874 (No. 2) or the Local Government Board's Provisional Orders Confirmation (No. 2) Act 1874	37 & 38 Vict. c. xix	30 June 1874
An Act to confirm certain Provisional Orders of the Local Government Board relating to the Districts of Barmouth, Ealing, Holyhead, the City of Lincoln, Mileham, Walton-on-the-Hill, and Waterloo-with-Seaforth, and to the City of Oxford.
	Barmouth Order 1874 Provisional Order for extending the Borrowing Powers of the Sanitary Authority for the Urban Sanitary District of Barmouth.	
	Ealing Order 1874 Provisional Order to enable the Ealing Local Board to put in force the Compulsory Clauses of the Lands Clauses Consolidation Act, 1845.	
	Holyhead Order 1874 Provisional Order for extending the Local Government District of Holyhead, and for prescribing the number of Members of the Local Board.	
	Lincoln Order 1874 Provisional Order to enable the Urban Sanitary Authority for the City of Lincoln to put in force the Compulsory Clauses of the Lands Clauses Consolidation Act, 1845.	
	Mileham Order 1874 Provisional Order for dissolving the Local Government District of Mileham, in the County of Norfolk.	
	Walton-on-the-Hill Order 1874 Provisional Order for extending the Borrowing Powers of the Sanitary Authority for the Urban Sanitary District of Walton-on-the-Hill.	
	Waterloo-with-Seaforth Order 1874 Provisional Order to extend the Local Government District of Waterloo-with-Seaforth.	
	Oxford Order 1874 Provisional Order for Alteration of Local Act. (Note: Oxford Poor Act 1854 (17 & 18 Vict. c. ccxix))	
Public Health (Scotland) Supplemental Act 1874	37 & 38 Vict. c. xx	30 June 1874
An Act to confirm a certain Provisional Order relating to Duntocher and Dalmuir made under the "Public Health (Scotland) Act, 1867." (Note: Public Health (Scotland) Act 1867 (30 & 31 Vict. c. 101))
	Duntocher and Dalmuir Order 1874 Provisional Order under the "Public Health (Scotland) Act, 1867." Parish of West or Old Kilpatrick. (Special Water Supply District of Duntocher and Dalmuir.)	
Kew and Other Bridges Act 1869 Amendment Act 1874	37 & 38 Vict. c. xxi	30 June 1874
An Act for conferring enlarged borrowing powers on the Joint Committee acting under the Kew and other Bridges Act, 1869, (Note: Kew and Other Bridges Act 1869 (32 & 33 Vict. c. xix)) and for otherwise amending that Act.
Thames Valley Drainage Act 1874 (repealed)	37 & 38 Vict. c. xxii	30 June 1874
An Act for amending "The Thames Valley Drainage Act, 1871," (Note: Thames Valley Drainage Act 1871 (34 & 35 Vict. c. clviii)) and for other purposes. (Repealed by Thames Conservancy Act 1950 (14 Geo. 6. c. l))
Bristol and Exeter Railway Act 1874	37 & 38 Vict. c. xxiii	30 June 1874
An Act to enable the Bristol and Exeter Railway Company to make a new Branch Railway in the County of Devon, and to confer further Powers upon the Company with respect to their Undertaking and the Undertaking of the Culm Valley Railway Company, and upon the Bristol and Exeter and Great Western Railway Companies with respect to the Bristol Harbour Railway.
Grantham Gas Act 1874	37 & 38 Vict. c. xxiv	30 June 1874
An Act for better supplying with Gas Grantham and its neighbourhood, in the county of Lincoln.
Castleisland Railway Amendment Act 1874	37 & 38 Vict. c. xxv	30 June 1874
An Act to enable the Castleisland Railway Company to raise additional Capital; to enable the Grand Jury of the county of Kerry to give a Baronial Guarantee, and to levy cesses in the Barony of Trughenackmy in the said county; and for other purposes.
South Devon Railway Act 1874	37 & 38 Vict. c. xxvi	30 June 1874
An Act to confer further powers on the South Devon Railway Company with reference to their own and other undertakings; to vest in them and in the Great Western and Bristol and Exeter Railway Companies the undertaking of the Plymouth Great Western Dock Company; and for other purposes.
Midland Great Western Railway of Ireland Act 1874 (repealed)	37 & 38 Vict. c. xxvii	30 June 1874
An Act to enable the Midland Great Western Railway of Ireland Company to make additional Branch Railways; to acquire additional Lands; and for other purposes. (Repealed by Statute Law (Repeals) Act 2013 (c. 2))
Dublin General Cemetery Company's Act 1874	37 & 38 Vict. c. xxviii	30 June 1874
An Act to enable the General Cemetery Company of Dublin to enlarge their Cemetery, to raise a further sum of money; and for other purposes.
Lymm Water Act 1874	37 & 38 Vict. c. xxix	30 June 1874
An Act for supplying with Water the parishes of Lymm and Oughtrington, both in the county of Chester.
Mersey Docks Act 1874	37 & 38 Vict. c. xxx	30 June 1874
An Act for varying and making other provision as to certain of the Rates and Dues leviable by the Mersey Docks and Harbour Board; and for other purposes.
Caledonian and North British Railways Act 1874	37 & 38 Vict. c. xxxi	30 June 1874
An Act for enabling the Caledonian Railway Company to make a connecting Line and Junction between their Railway and the North British Railway at Wester Dairy, near Edinburgh, and for extending to certain traffic, passing viâ that Junction, certain powers, rights, and facilities vested in the said Company with respect to the North British Railway; and for other purposes.
District Railway (Hammersmith Extension Amalgamation) Act 1874	37 & 38 Vict. c. xxxii	30 June 1874
An Act for the Amalgamation of the Undertaking of the Hammersmith Extension Railway Company with that of the Metropolitan District Railway Company.
Hartlepool Gas and Water Act, 1867, Amendment Act 1874	37 & 38 Vict. c. xxxiii	30 June 1874
An Act to authorise the Hartlepool Gas and Water Company to construct additional Waterworks.
Leeds Corporation Water Act 1874 (repealed)	37 & 38 Vict. c. xxxiv	30 June 1874
An Act to enable the Mayor, Aldermen, and Burgesses of the Borough of Leeds, in the West Riding of the County of York, to make further Provision for the Supply of Water; for Protection of Water Supply; to raise additional Money for Waterworks purposes; to alter existing Bents and Charges for Water; and for other purposes. (Repealed by Leeds Corporation (Consolidation) Act 1905 (5 Edw. 7. c. i))
Ardmillan Reclamation Act 1874	37 & 38 Vict. c. xxxv	30 June 1874
An Act for embanking and reclaiming certain waste or slob lands near to Ardmillan, Strangford Lough, in the county of Down.
Peterborough Gas Act 1874	37 & 38 Vict. c. xxxvi	30 June 1874
An Act for empowering the Peterborough Gas Company to construct new works, to acquire additional lands for the same; and for other purposes.
Fylde Waterworks Act 1874	37 & 38 Vict. c. xxxvii	30 June 1874
An Act to enable the Fylde Waterworks Company to make additional Works; to amend the Fylde Waterworks Act, 1861, (Note: Fylde Waterworks Act 1861 (24 & 25 Vict. c. cliv)) and the Fylde Waterworks Act, 1870; (Note: Fylde Waterworks Act 1870 (33 & 34 Vict. c. xix)) to increase the Capital of the Company; to extend and define their Limits of Supply; and for other purposes.
Leeds, Castleford and Pontefract Junction Railway Act 1874	37 & 38 Vict. c. xxxviii	30 June 1874
An Act to empower the Leeds, Castleford, and Pontefract Junction Railway Company to make additional Railways and to abandon portions of their authorised Railways; and for other purposes.
London and Blackwall Railway Act 1874	37 & 38 Vict. c. xxxix	30 June 1874
An Act to enable the London and Blackwall Railway Company to enlarge certain of their stations; to authorise agreements with other companies; and for other purposes.
Wexford Harbour Act 1874	37 & 38 Vict. c. xl	30 June 1874
An Act for making further provision for the Improvement, Maintenance, and Management of the Harbour of Wexford, for dissolving and reconstituting the Wexford Harbour Commissioners; and for other purposes.
Exeter and Crediton Railway Act 1874	37 & 38 Vict. c. xli	30 June 1874
An Act for the widening of the Exeter and Crediton Railway, and for the laying down of additional lines of rails upon that railway, and the connecting of them with the Bristol and Exeter Railway; and for other purposes.
Byker Bridge (Newcastle-upon-Tyne) Act 1874	37 & 38 Vict. c. xlii	30 June 1874
An Act to authorise the Construction of a Bridge across the Ouseburn Valley, in the township of Byker, at Newcastle-upon-Tyne.
Great Southern and Western Railway Act 1874	37 & 38 Vict. c. xliii	30 June 1874
An Act for enabling the Great Southern and Western Railway Company to construct Railways at Cork and Dublin; to acquire additional Lands for the purposes of their Undertaking; to widen or alter certain of their Bridges; and for other purposes.
Enniskillen Gas Act 1874	37 & 38 Vict. c. xliv	30 June 1874
An Act for better supplying Enniskillen in the county of Fermanagh with Gas.
North Metropolitan Tramways Act 1874	37 & 38 Vict. c. xlv	30 June 1874
An Act to extend the time for the construction by the North Metropolitan Tramways Company of Works within the city of London; and for other purposes.
Fairfield Local Board Waterworks Act 1874	37 & 38 Vict. c. xlvi	30 June 1874
An Act to authorise the Local Board for the District of Fairfield to construct Waterworks and supply Water; and for other purposes.
Paignton Pier Act 1874	37 & 38 Vict. c. xlvii	30 June 1874
An Act to authorise the erection of a Pier and Works at Paignton in the county of Devon; and for other purposes.
Letterkenny Railway (Extension of Time) Act 1874	37 & 38 Vict. c. xlviii	30 June 1874
An Act to extend the time for the completion of the Letterkenny Railway.
Londonderry Port and Harbour Act 1874	37 & 38 Vict. c. xlix	30 June 1874
An Act for empowering the Londonderry Port and Harbour Commissioners to construct Quays and other Works; for conferring additional Powers on those Commissioners; for extending the enactments relating to them; and for other purposes.
Medway Docks (Extension of Time) Act 1874	37 & 38 Vict. c. l	30 June 1874
An Act to further extend the time for the purchase of lands and for the construction of the works authorised by the Medway Docks Act, 1866. (Note: Medway Docks Act 1866 (29 & 30 Vict. c. ccxxix))
Metropolitan Railway Act 1874	37 & 38 Vict. c. li	30 June 1874
An Act to grant further powers to the Metropolitan Railway Company with respect to their surplus land; and for other purposes relating to the same Company.
Dover and Deal Railway Act 1874	37 & 38 Vict. c. lii	30 June 1874
An Act to authorise the Construction of Railways between Dover and Deal; and for other purposes.
Exe Valley Railway Act 1874	37 & 38 Vict. c. liii	30 June 1874
An Act for making Railways in the county of Devon to be called the Exe Valley Railway; and for other purposes.
London, Brighton and South Coast Railway Act 1874	37 & 38 Vict. c. liv	30 June 1874
An Act to enable the London, Brighton, and South Coast Railway Company to take on lease the Hayling Railways; to consolidate the preference stocks in their capital; to make other provisions with respect to their capital; and for other purposes with relation to the same Company.
Stocksbridge Railway Act 1874	37 & 38 Vict. c. lv	30 June 1874
An Act for making a railway from the Manchester, Sheffield, and Lincolnshire Railway at Deepcar to Stocksbridge; and for other purposes.
Teign Valley Railway Act 1874	37 & 38 Vict. c. lvi	30 June 1874
An Act for conferring further Powers on the Teign Valley Railway Company in relation to their Undertaking.
Wrexham Waterworks Act 1874	37 & 38 Vict. c. lvii	30 June 1874
An Act to authorise the Wrexham Waterworks Company to make new Reservoirs; to extend their limits of supply; to raise more money; and for other purposes.
Albert Life Assurance Company Arbitration Act 1874	37 & 38 Vict. c. lviii	30 June 1874
An Act for making further provision for the settlement of the affairs of the Albert Life Assurance Company by Arbitration; and for other purposes.
East and West India Dock Company Act 1874 (repealed)	37 & 38 Vict. c. lix	30 June 1874
An Act to amend the Acts relating to the East and West India Dock Company. (Repealed by Port of London (Consolidation) Act 1920 (10 & 11 Geo. 5. c. clxxiii))
Llanelly Gas Act 1874	37 & 38 Vict. c. lx	30 June 1874
An Act for better lighting with Gas the district, parliamentary borough, and town of Llanelly, and the neighbourhood thereof.
City of Glasgow Union Railway Act 1874	37 & 38 Vict. c. lxi	30 June 1874
An Act to confer further powers on the City of Glasgow Union Railway Company; and for other purposes.
Leicester Improvement Act 1874 (repealed)	37 & 38 Vict. c. lxii	30 June 1874
An Act to confer further Powers on the Corporation of the Borough of Leicester for the prevention of Floods within the borough; and for other purposes. (Repealed by Leicestershire Act 1985 (c. xvii))
Manchester South District Railway Act 1874	37 & 38 Vict. c. lxiii	30 June 1874
An Act to enable the Manchester South District Railway Company to abandon portions of their authorised undertaking, and to construct new Railways; and for other purposes.
Aberdare and Aberaman Gas Act 1874	37 & 38 Vict. c. lxiv	30 June 1874
An Act to authorise the Aberdare and Aberaman Gas Company to purchase the undertaking of the Aberdare Gas Company, and to raise additional Capital; and for oilier purposes.
Chester Waterworks Act 1874	37 & 38 Vict. c. lxv	30 June 1874
An Act for granting further powers to the Chester Waterworks Company.
Hythe Improvement and Waterworks Act 1874	37 & 38 Vict. c. lxvi	30 June 1874
An Act to extend the borough of Hythe in the county of Kent, and to enable the Mayor, Aldermen, and Burgesses thereof to construct new waterworks, streets, and sewers; and to make further provisions for the drainage and improvement of the borough; and for other purposes.
Milford Docks Act 1874	37 & 38 Vict. c. lxvii	30 June 1874
An Act for authorising the construction of Docks and other Works upon or near Hubberston Pill at Milford, in the county of Pembroke; and for other purposes.
Edinburgh Tramways Act 1874 (repealed)	37 & 38 Vict. c. lxviii	30 June 1874
An Act to extend the time for the widening and improvement of the North Bridge by the Corporation of Edinburgh under an agreement confirmed by the Edinburgh Tramways Act, 1871, (Note: Edinburgh Tramways Act 1871 (34 & 35 Vict. c. lxxxix)) and to authorise the Edinburgh Street Tramways Company to relinquish the construction of certain of their authorised Tramways; and for other purposes. (Repealed by Edinburgh Corporation Order Confirmation Act 1932 (22 & 23 Geo. 5. c. vii))
Dublin Metropolitan Junction Railways Act 1874	37 & 38 Vict. c. lxix	30 June 1874
An Act for conferring powers upon the Commissioners of Her Majesty's Treasury, and for making other provisions with respect to the money deposited in respect to the application to Parliament for "The Dublin Metropolitan Junction Railways Act, 1865." (Note: Dublin Metropolitan Junction Railways Act 1865 (28 & 29 Vict. c. ccclxxxii))
Lakenheath and Brandon Drainage Act 1874	37 & 38 Vict. c. lxx	30 June 1874
An Act to amend the Acts relating to the Lakenheath and Brandon Drainage, and to authorise the Commissioners to raise more Money; and for other purposes.
Westleigh, Pennington and Bedford Local Boards (Gas) Act 1874	37 & 38 Vict. c. lxxi	30 June 1874
An Act for empowering the Local Boards for the Districts of Westleigh, Pennington, and Bedford, all in the county of Lancaster, to make and supply Gas, and for carrying into effect an agreement between them and the Leigh District Gas Company for the joint purchase by them of that Company's undertaking; and for other purposes.
Plymouth, Stonehouse and Devonport Tramways Act 1874 (repealed)	37 & 38 Vict. c. lxxii	30 June 1874
An Act to authorise the Plymouth, Stonehouse, and Devonport Tramways Company to construct additional Tramways in the parish of Stoke Damerel; and for other purposes. (Repealed by Plymouth Corporation Act 1915 (5 & 6 Geo. 5. c. lxix))
Belfast and Northern Counties Railway Act 1874	37 & 38 Vict. c. lxxiii	30 June 1874
An Act to enable the Belfast and Northern Counties Railway Company to purchase additional lands; and for other purposes.
Great Western Railway Act 1874	37 & 38 Vict. c. lxxiv	30 June 1874
An Act for conferring further powers on the Great Western Railway Company in relation to their own undertaking and the undertakings of other Companies; and for other purposes.
North London Railway Act 1874	37 & 38 Vict. c. lxxv	30 June 1874
An Act to repeal certain provisions of the Acts relating to the North London Railway Company, and to confer various additional powers upon that Company; and for other purposes.
Whitby, Redcar and Middlesbrough Union Railway Act 1874	37 & 38 Vict. c. lxxvi	30 June 1874
An Act authorising the Whitby, Redcar, and Middlesborough Union Railway Company to raise additional Capital.
Dublin Port and City Railway Act 1874	37 & 38 Vict. c. lxxvii	30 June 1874
An Act for conferring powers upon the Commissioners of Her Majesty's Treasury, and for making provision with respect to the Exchequer Bills deposited in reference to the application to Parliament for "The Dublin Trunk Connecting Railway (Deviation, &c.) Act, 1865." (Note: Dublin Trunk Connecting Railway (Deviation, &c.) Act 1865 (28 & 29 Vict. c. ccxxi))
Padiham Water Act 1874	37 & 38 Vict. c. lxxviii	30 June 1874
An Act for authorising the Local Board for the District of Padiham and Hapton in the county of Lancaster to acquire the Undertaking of the Padiham Waterworks Company, and to supply Water within that Company's limits of supply; and for other purposes.
Alexandra Park Railway Abandonment Act 1874 (repealed)	37 & 38 Vict. c. lxxix	30 June 1874
An Act for the Abandonment of the Alexandra Park Railway. (Repealed by Statute Law (Repeals) Act 2013 (c. 2))
Usk and Towy Railway Act 1874 (repealed)	37 & 38 Vict. c. lxxx	30 June 1874
An Act to authorise the Usk and Towy Railway Company to divert portions of their authorised Line; and for other purposes. (Repealed by Statute Law (Repeals) Act 2013 (c. 2))
Somerset and Dorset Railway Act 1874	37 & 38 Vict. c. lxxxi	30 June 1874
An Act for conferring further powers on the Somerset and Dorset Railway Company.
Cadogan and Hans Place Improvements Act 1874	37 & 38 Vict. c. lxxxii	30 June 1874
An Act to authorise the construction of new Thoroughfares in the neighbourhood of Cadogan and Hans Place in the Metropolis, (Note: The new road was a westwards extension of Pont Street, from Sloan Street to Walton Street, opposite the end of Beauchamp Place (originally named Grove Place).) and certain improvements in connexion therewith.
Glasgow and South Western Railway Act 1874	37 & 38 Vict. c. lxxxiii	30 June 1874
An Act to confer additional powers on the Glasgow and South-western Railway Company for the construction of Works and the acquisition of Lands; and for other purposes connected with their undertaking.
London Central Railway Act 1874 (repealed)	37 & 38 Vict. c. lxxxiv	30 June 1874
An Act for conferring further powers on the London Central Railway Company in relation to their undertaking; and for other purposes. (Repealed by London Central Railway (Abandonment) Act 1875 (38 & 39 Vict. c. cxiv))
Edinburgh Markets and Customs Act 1874 (repealed)	37 & 38 Vict. c. lxxxv	30 June 1874
An Act to improve, extend, establish, and regulate Markets and Market Places and the Slaughterhouses of the city of Edinburgh; to alter rates and customs; and to provide for the extinction of the city debt; and for other purposes. (Repealed by Edinburgh Corporation Order Confirmation Act 1933 (24 & 25 Geo. 5. c. v))
North and South Woolwich Subway Act 1874	37 & 38 Vict. c. lxxxvi	30 June 1874
An Act to incorporate a Company for making a Subway under the River Thames from North Woolwich to South Woolwich.
Gas and Water Orders Confirmation Act 1874	37 & 38 Vict. c. lxxxvii	16 July 1874
An Act for confirming certain Provisional Orders made by the Board of Trade under The Gas and Water Works Facilities Act, 1870, (Note: Gas and Water Works Facilities Act 1870 (33 & 34 Vict. c. 70)) relating to Braintree and Becking Gas, Brough Elloughton and District Gas, Chelmsford Gas, Dartford Gas, Guildford Gas, Harwich Gas, Lofthouse and District Gas, Retford Gas, Romford Gas, Sidmouth Gas, Sutton-in-Ashfield Gas, High Wycombe Water, Maidstone Water, Inverness Gas and Water.
	Braintree and Bocking Gas Order 1874 Order empowering the Braintree and Bocking Gas Company to maintain and continue Gasworks and to manufacture and supply Gas in the parishes of Braintree, Bocking, and Black Notley, all in the county of Essex.	
	Brough Elloughton and District Gas Order 1874 Order empowering the Brough Elloughton and Welton Gaslight and Coke Company (Limited) to maintain and continue Gasworks and to manufacture Gas at Brough in the parish of Elloughton, and to supply Gas within the townships and parishes of Brough Elloughton, North and South Cave, Ellerker, Brantingham, and Ferriby, in the county of York.	
	Chelmsford Gas Order 1874 Order empowering the Chelmsford Gaslight and Coke Company to maintain and continue Gasworks and to manufacture and supply Gas in the town and parish of Chelmsford and the several parishes of Springfield, Broomfield, and Great Baddow, all in the county of Essex.	
	Dartford Gas Order 1874 Order empowering the Dartford Gas Company to construct and maintain additional Gasworks in the parish of Dartford in the county of Kent.	
	Guildford Gas Order 1874 Order empowering the Guildford Gaslight and Coke Company to manufacture and supply Gas to the parishes of East Clandon, West Clandon, Send and Ripley, Bramley, Wonersh, Saint Martha's-on-the-Hill, Albury, Shere, and Worplesdon, all in the county of Surrey, and to raise additional capital.	
	Harwich Gas Order 1874 Order empowering the Harwich Gas and Coke Company to maintain and continue Gasworks and to manufacture and supply Gas in the parish of Saint Nicholas, Harwich (including the town of Harwich), and the several parishes of Dovercourt and Ramsey, all in the county of Essex.	
	Lofthouse Gas Order 1874 Order empowering the Lofthouse and District Gas Company (Limited) to construct and maintain Gasworks in Skinningrove, in the north riding of the county of York, and to make and supply Gas in the parishes or townships of Lofthouse, Easington, Liverton, Skinningrove, and Kilton, in the north riding of the county of York.	
	Retford Gas Order 1874 Order empowering the Retford Gas and Coke Company, Limited, to maintain and continue Gasworks and to manufacture and supply Gas within the parishes of East Retford, West Retford, Ordsall, and Clarborough, all in the county of Nottingham.	
	Romford Gas Order 1874 Order empowering the Romford Gas and Coke Company to maintain and continue Gasworks and to manufacture and supply Gas in the town and parish of Romford, and the parishes of Hornchurch and Upminster, all in the county of Essex.	
	Sidmouth Gas Order 1874 Order conferring powers for the maintenance and continuance of existing, and for the construction of new and additional Gasworks, and for the manufacture and supply of Gas within the parishes of Sidmouth, Salcombe Regis, and Sidbury, in the county of Devon.	
	Sutton-in-Ashfield Gas Order 1874 Order empowering the Sutton-in-Ashfield Gaslight and Coke Company to maintain and continue Gasworks and the manufacture and supply Gas in the parishes of Sutton-in-Ashfield, Skegby, Teversall, Kirkby-in-Ashfield, Newstead, and Annesley, all in the county of Nottingham.	
	High Wycombe Water Order 1874 Order empowering the High Wycombe Waterworks, Baths, and Wash-houses Company (Limited) to construct Waterworks and to supply Water in the borough of Chepping Wycombe (otherwise High Wycombe) and the parish of Chipping Wycombe, both in the county of Buckingham.	
	Maidstone Water Order 1874 Order empowering the Maidstone Waterworks Company to maintain, construct, and continue additional Waterworks.	
	Inverness Gas and Water Order 1874 Order empowering the Inverness Gas and Water Company to raise additional Capital.	
Drainage and Improvement of Lands Supplemental Act (Ireland) Act 1874	37 & 38 Vict. c. lxxxviii	16 July 1874
An Act to confirm a Provisional Order under "The Drainage and Improvement of Lands (Ireland) Act, 1863," (Note: Drainage and Improvement of Lands (Ireland) Act 1863 (26 & 27 Vict. c. 88)) and the Acts amending the same.
	Ballynacourty Drainage District Order 1874	
Local Government Board's Provisional Orders Confirmation Act 1874 (No. 3) or the Local Government Board's Provisional Orders Confirmation (No. 3) Act 1874	37 & 38 Vict. c. lxxxix	16 July 1874
An Act to confirm certain Provisional Orders of the Local Government Board relating to the Districts of Alverstoke, Birkdale, Gravesend, Handsworth, Newington, Normanton, Preston, Sittingbourne, South Hornsey, South Stockton, and Whitby.
	Alverstoke Order 1874	
	Birkdale Order 1874	
	Gravesend Order 1874	
	Handsworth Order 1874	
	Newington Order 1874	
	Normanton Order 1874	
	Preston Order 1874	
	Sittingbourne Order 1874	
	South Hornsey Order 1874	
	South Stockton Order 1874	
	Whitby Order 1874	
Alexandra (Newport) Dock Act 1874	37 & 38 Vict. c. xc	16 July 1874
An Act to authorise the Alexandra (Newport) Dock Company to raise further moneys, and to lease their undertaking.
Barlow's Patent Act 1874	37 & 38 Vict. c. xci	16 July 1874
An Act for rendering valid certain Letters Patent granted to Henry Bernoulli Barlow for Improvements in Embroidering Machines.
Birmingham and Lichfield Junction Railway (Deviation) Act 1874 (repealed)	37 & 38 Vict. c. xcii	16 July 1874
An Act to authorise the Birmingham and Lichfield Junction Railway Company to divert part of their authorised Railway; and for other purposes. (Repealed by Statute Law (Repeals) Act 2013 (c. 2))
Brewood and Wolverhampton Railway Act 1874 (repealed)	37 & 38 Vict. c. xciii	16 July 1874
An Act to authorise the construction of a Branch Railway from the London and North-western Railway to Brewood in the county of Stafford; and for other purposes connected with such Branch Railway. (Repealed by Brewood and Wolverhampton Railway (Abandonment) Act 1879 (42 & 43 Vict. c. xv))
Caledonian and Glasgow and South Western Railways (Joint Lines) Act 1874	37 & 38 Vict. c. xciv	16 July 1874
An Act for enabling the Caledonian and the Glasgow and South-western Railway Companies to execute certain Works and acquire certain Lands in the counties of Renfrew and Lanark, in connexion with their Glasgow and Paisley and Glasgow and Kilmarnock Joint Lines and Branches thereof; and for other purposes.
Great Northern Railway (Deviations) Act 1874	37 & 38 Vict. c. xcv	16 July 1874
An Act to authorise the Great Northern Railway Company to make deviations and alterations in parts of their authorised Railway in the counties of Nottingham and Leicester, and in the west riding of the county of York.
Lee Conservancy Act 1874	37 & 38 Vict. c. xcvi	16 July 1874
An Act for empowering the Lee Conservancy Board to execute further Works for the improvement of their navigation; and for amending the Acts relating to the Lee; and for other purposes.
Metropolitan Board of Works Act 1874	37 & 38 Vict. c. xcvii	16 July 1874
An Act for empowering the Metropolitan Board of Works to construct a new road near Finsbury Park; for making better provision for the Sewerage of the District of the South Hornsey Local Board; for amending the provisions relating to the Newington Butts Improvement; for authorising the Metropolitan Board of Works to pay expenses incurred in respect of Thanksgiving Day; and for other purposes.
Monmouthshire Railway and Canal Act 1874	37 & 38 Vict. c. xcviii	16 July 1874
An Act to enable the Monmouthshire Railway and Canal Company to make new lines of Railway, and to confer on them further powers with reference to their undertaking.
Waterford and Wexford Railway Act 1874	37 & 38 Vict. c. xcix	16 July 1874
An Act to confer further powers upon the Waterford and Wexford Railway Company; and for other purposes.
Neath Corporation Gas Act 1874	37 & 38 Vict. c. c	16 July 1874
An Act to enable the Corporation of Neath to acquire the undertaking of the Neath New Gas Company; and for other purposes.
Horbury Local Board Act 1874	37 & 38 Vict. c. ci	16 July 1874
An Act for empowering the Local Board for the District of Horbury in the west riding of the county of York to make Waterworks, and to supply Water, and to make Sewerage Works; and for other purposes.
Lancashire and Yorkshire Railway (New Works and Additional Powers) Act 1874	37 & 38 Vict. c. cii	16 July 1874
An Act for conferring further powers on the Lancashire and Yorkshire Railway Company; and for other purposes relating to that Company and to the London and Northwestern Railway Company.
South Eastern Railway Act 1874	37 & 38 Vict. c. ciii	16 July 1874
An Act to confer upon the South-eastern Railway Company further powers with reference to their own undertakings and those of other Companies; and for other purposes.
Swansea Harbour Act 1874	37 & 38 Vict. c. civ	16 July 1874
An Act to enable the Swansea Harbour Trustees to construct additional Docks, Railways, and other Works; and for other purposes.
North Eastern Railway (New Lines) Act 1874	37 & 38 Vict. c. cv	16 July 1874
An Act for enabling the North-eastern Railway Company to construct Railways in the counties of York and Durham, and at or near York; and for other purposes.
Harrow, Edgware, and London Railway (Abandonment) Act 1874 (repealed)	37 & 38 Vict. c. cvi	16 July 1874
An Act to authorise the Abandonment of the Harrow, Edgware, and London Railway; and for other purposes. (Repealed by Statute Law (Repeals) Act 2013 (c. 2))
Shipley Local Government Act 1874 (repealed)	37 & 38 Vict. c. cvii	16 July 1874
An Act to amend the Shipley Waterworks and Police Act, 1854; (Note: Shipley Waterworks and Police Act 1854 (17 & 18 Vict. c. lxxvii)) and to make further provision for the improvement of the Local Board District of Shipley in the west riding of the county of York; and for other purposes. (Repealed by West Yorkshire Act 1980 (c. xiv))
Middlesbrough Extension and Improvement Act 1874 (repealed)	37 & 38 Vict. c. cviii	16 July 1874
An Act to extend the boundaries of the Municipal Borough of Middlesbrough in the north riding of the county of York; to purchase a private road; (Note: The road from Middlesbrough to Marton, now known as Marton Road.) to raise further moneys; to alter, amend, and in part repeal the existing Acts relating to the Borough and District; and for other purposes. (Repealed by Middlesbrough Corporation Act 1933 (23 & 24 Geo. 5. c. lxxxiii))
North British, Arbroath and Montrose Railway Act 1874	37 & 38 Vict. c. cix	16 July 1874
An Act to extend the time for the purchase of Lands for, and for the construction of the North British, Arbroath, and Montrose Railway.
Callander and Oban Railway (Tyndrum to Oban) Act 1874	37 & 38 Vict. c. cx	16 July 1874
An Act for enabling the Callander and Oban Railway Company to complete their railway to Oban; and for other purposes.
City of Gloucester Extension and Improvement Act 1874	37 & 38 Vict. c. cxi	16 July 1874
An Act for extending the Limits of the City and County of the City of Gloucester; and for empowering the Mayor, Aldermen, and Citizens of the City to improve the City Quay and the Cattle Market; and for other purposes.
South Indian Railway Act 1874 (repealed)	37 & 38 Vict. c. cxii	16 July 1874
An Act for the Amalgamation of the Great Southern of India and Carnatic Railway Companies, and for enabling the amalgamated Company to make Agreements with the Secretary of State in Council of India; and for other purposes. (Repealed by Statute Law (Repeals) Act 2013 (c. 2))
Crystal Palace and Sevenoaks Railways Act 1874	37 & 38 Vict. c. cxiii	16 July 1874
An Act to amend the provisions of the Awards made under "The London, Chatham, and Dover Railway (Arbitration) Act, 1869," (Note: London, Chatham, and Dover Railway (Arbitration) Act 1869 (32 & 33 Vict. c. cxvi)) affecting the Crystal Palace and South London Junction Railway Company and the Sevenoaks, Maidstone, and Tunbridge Railway Company as to the working and maintenance of certain Railways of those Companies respectively; and for other purposes.
London Chatham and Dover Railway Act 1874	37 & 38 Vict. c. cxiv	16 July 1874
An Act to authorise the London, Chatham, and Dover Railway Company to make a Loop Line of Railway at Beckenham; and for other purposes.
South Wales Mineral Railway Act 1874	37 & 38 Vict. c. cxv	16 July 1874
An Act to authorise certain Arrangements concerning the capital of the South Wales Mineral Railway Company; and for other purposes.
Waterford and New Ross Harbours Act 1874	37 & 38 Vict. c. cxvi	16 July 1874
An Act to confer on the Commissioners for improving the Ports and Harbours of Waterford and New Ross respectively, additional powers; to alter existing and impose new Rates; to facilitate the completion of authorised Works, and the borrowing of further Moneys; and for other purposes.
Wigan Junction Railways Act 1874	37 & 38 Vict. c. cxvii	16 July 1874
An Act to authorise the Construction of Railways in Lancashire, to be called the Wigan Junction Railways.
Bute Docks Act 1874	37 & 38 Vict. c. cxviii	16 July 1874
An Act for conferring on the Trustees and others claiming under the Will of the late Marquess of Bute power to extend their Docks and Railways at Cardiff; and for other purposes.
Bromley Direct Railway Act 1874	37 & 38 Vict. c. cxix	16 July 1874
An Act for making a Railway from Bromley in the county of Kent to the Grove Park Station of the South-eastern Railway; and for other purposes.
Aberystwyth Corporation Act 1874 (repealed)	37 & 38 Vict. c. cxx	16 July 1874
An Act for vesting the Harbour of Aberystwyth in the Corporation of Aberystwyth, and to enable them to maintain the same; and for other purposes. (Repealed by Aberystwyth Harbour Act 1987 (c. xiv))
Chepping Wycombe Improvement Act 1874	37 & 38 Vict. c. cxxi	16 July 1874
An Act for empowering the Mayor, Aldermen, and Burgesses of the Borough of Chepping Wycombe otherwise High Wycombe, in the county of Buckingham, to make a new Street; and for amending the Acts relating to the Borough; and for other purposes.
Crystal Palace and South London Junction Railway Act 1874	37 & 38 Vict. c. cxxii	16 July 1874
An Act to authorise the abandonment of the Railway authorised by "The Crystal Palace and South London Junction Railway Act, 1864." (Note: Crystal Palace and South London Junction Railway Act 1864 (27 & 28 Vict. c. xciv))
Skipton Local Board of Health Act 1874	37 & 38 Vict. c. cxxiii	16 July 1874
An Act for transferring to the Skipton Local Board of Health the undertaking of the Skipton Water Company, and for empowering the Local Board to supply Water within the limits of supply of the Company; and for other purposes.
Wigan Improvement Act 1874	37 & 38 Vict. c. cxxiv	16 July 1874
An Act for empowering the Corporation of Wigan to make Sewerage Works for utilization or treatment of sewage; and to make new Streets and improvements of Streets; and to acquire the undertaking of the Wigan Gas Company; and for other purposes.
Belfast Corporation Gas Act 1874	37 & 38 Vict. c. cxxv	16 July 1874
An Act for the transfer to the Mayor, Aldermen, and Burgesses of the Borough of Belfast of the undertaking of the Belfast Gaslight Company; and for other purposes.
Caledonian Railway (Additional Powers) Act 1874	37 & 38 Vict. c. cxxvi	16 July 1874
An Act for enabling the Caledonian Railway Company to make and maintain certain new works, and certain deviations of authorised and existing works; and to acquire certain lands in the counties of Lanark, Forfar, Perth, and Cumberland; for vesting in them the undertaking of the Busby Railway Company; for dissolving that Company; and for other purposes.
Charnwood Forest Railway Act 1874	37 & 38 Vict. c. cxxvii	16 July 1874
An Act for making a Railway from Coalville to Loughborough in the county of Leicester, to be called the "Charnwood Forest Railway;" and for other purposes.
Great Eastern Railway Act 1874	37 & 38 Vict. c. cxxviii	16 July 1874
An Act for authorising the Great Eastern Railway Company to make railways to Alexandra Park (Note: Alexandra Park, London.) and in the parish of Chingford; (Note: Chingford branch line.) and to make a Quay in the River Stour and Railways connecting it with their Harwich Branch; and to make various improvements of their Railways and Works; and to abandon a certain Railway; and for conferring on them further powers in relation to their undertaking and the undertakings of certain other Companies; and for other purposes.
Leeds New Railway Station Enlargement Act 1874	37 & 38 Vict. c. cxxix	16 July 1874
An Act for enabling the North-eastern and London and North-western Railway Companies to extend and enlarge the Leeds New Railway Station, and to make an Approach thereto; and for other purposes.
London and North-western Railway (Wales, &c.) Act 1874	37 & 38 Vict. c. cxxx	16 July 1874
An Act for enabling the London and North-western Railway Company to construct new Railways and acquire additional Lands in the counties of Glamorgan, Brecon, Monmouth, Merioneth, and Carmarthen; and for other purposes.
South Yorkshire Railway and River Dun Company's Vesting Act 1874	37 & 38 Vict. c. cxxxi	16 July 1874
An Act to vest the Undertaking of the South Yorkshire Railway and River Dun Company in the Manchester, Sheffield, and Lincolnshire Railway Company.
Manchester, Sheffield, and Lincolnshire Railway Act 1874	37 & 38 Vict. c. cxxxii	16 July 1874
An Act for authorising the Manchester, Sheffield, and Lincolnshire Railway Company to make new Branch Railways and other Works; for vesting in them the undertakings of the Macclesfield, Knutsford, and Warrington Railway Company and the Widnes Railway Company; for conferring upon them additional powers; and for other purposes.
Midland and North-eastern Railways Act 1874	37 & 38 Vict. c. cxxxiii	16 July 1874
An Act for enabling the Midland and North-eastern Railway Companies to make a Railway from the Midland Railway near Swinton to the North-eastern Railway near Knottingley; and for other purposes.
North-eastern Railway Company's (Additional Powers) Act 1874 or the North Eastern Railway (Additional Powers) Act 1874	37 & 38 Vict. c. cxxxiv	16 July 1874
An Act for conferring additional powers on the North-eastern Railway Company for the construction of Works, and for the acquisition of Lands; and for other purposes connected with their Undertaking.
Alliance and Dublin Gas Act 1874	37 & 38 Vict. c. cxxxv	16 July 1874
An Act to alter and amend the Acts relating to the Alliance and Dublin Consumers Gas Company, and make further provision with respect to the quality and price of Gas within the Company's district; to confer on the Company additional powers as to Money, as to Steam Vessels, and otherwise; and for other purposes.
Nottingham Corporation (Gas) Act 1874 (repealed)	37 & 38 Vict. c. cxxxvi	16 July 1874
An Act for transferring to the Mayor, Aldermen, and Burgesses of the Borough of Nottingham the Undertaking of the Nottingham Gaslight and Coke Company. (Repealed by Statute Law (Repeals) Act 1995 (c. 44))
Nottingham Waterworks Act 1874 (repealed)	37 & 38 Vict. c. cxxxvii	16 July 1874
An Act for granting further powers to the Nottingham Waterworks Company. (Repealed by Statute Law (Repeals) Act 1995 (c. 44))
Swansea Improvements and Tramways Act 1874	37 & 38 Vict. c. cxxxviii	16 July 1874
An Act for authorising the making of new Streets and improvements of Streets, and the laying down of Tramways in and near Swansea; and for other purposes.
Wear Navigation and Sunderland Dock Act 1874 (repealed)	37 & 38 Vict. c. cxxxix	16 July 1874
An Act for enabling the River Wear Commissioners to make a series of short branch lines of Railway leading to their Docks; and for amending the Acts relating to the Commissioners; and for other purposes. (Repealed by Wear Navigation and Sunderland Dock (Consolidation and Amendment) Act 1922 (12 & 13 Geo. 5. c. lxxxiv))
Bray and Enniskerry Street Tramways Act 1874	37 & 38 Vict. c. cxl	16 July 1874
An Act to authorise the construction of Tramways from Bray to Enniskerry in the county of Wicklow; and for other purposes.
Cornwall and West Cornwall Railways Act 1874	37 & 38 Vict. c. cxli	16 July 1874
An Act to authorise the construction of branch railways and other works, and the acquisition of additional lands in connexion with the Cornwall, and West Cornwall Railways; and for other purposes.
Dublin Corporation Waterworks Act 1874	37 & 38 Vict. c. cxlii	16 July 1874
An Act to amend "The Dublin Corporation Waterworks Act, 1861;" (Note: Dublin Corporation Waterworks Act 1861 (24 & 25 Vict. c. clxxii)) and for other purposes.
South-western Railway (General) Act 1874	37 & 38 Vict. c. cxliii	16 July 1874
An Act to authorise the London and South-western Railway Company to enlarge and improve their Waterloo Terminus; to widen their main line of Railway in Battersea; to execute other Works and to purchase additional lands; and to raise further Moneys; and for other purposes.
Ystrad Gas and Water Company's Gas Act 1874 (repealed)	37 & 38 Vict. c. cxliv	16 July 1874
An Act to amend "The Ystrad Gas and Water Act, 1868," (Note: Ystrad Gas and Water Act 1868 (31 & 32 Vict. c. lvi)) and "The Ystrad Gas and Water Order, 1872," so far as the same relate to Gas. (Repealed by Rhondda Corporation Act 1973 (c. xxiii))
Neath Harbour Act 1874	37 & 38 Vict. c. cxlv	16 July 1874
An Act for enlarging and improving the Port and Harbour of Neath, and making certain Railways, Road Approaches, and other Works in connexion therewith; and for other purposes.
Rowrah and Kelton Fell (Mineral) Railway Act 1874	37 & 38 Vict. c. cxlvi	16 July 1874
An Act to authorise the Construction of a Railway in the county of Cumberland, from Rowrah, on the Whitehaven, Cleator, and Egremont Railway, to Kelton Fell; and for other purposes.
Forfarshire Roads Act 1874	37 & 38 Vict. c. cxlvii	16 July 1874
An Act to amend an Act of the fiftieth year of the reign of His Majesty King George the Third, intituled "An Act for better regulating the Statute Labour in the county of Forfar;" (Note: Statute Labour in Forfar (County) Act 1810 (50 Geo. 3. c. cxx)) to make better provision for the management, maintenance, repair, and improvement of the Roads in the county of Forfar; and for other purposes.
Glasgow, Bothwell, Hamilton, and Coatbridge Railway Act 1874	37 & 38 Vict. c. cxlviii	16 July 1874
An Act for making Railways to Bothwell and Hamilton, and other places in the county of Lanark; and for other purposes.
Kingsbury and Harrow Railway Act 1874	37 & 38 Vict. c. cxlix	16 July 1874
An Act to authorise the Metropolitan and the Metropolitan and Saint John's Wood Railway Companies to construct a Railway from Kingsbury to Harrow; and for other purposes.
Middle Level Act 1874	37 & 38 Vict. c. cl	16 July 1874
An Act for authorising the Middle Level Commissioners to make a new Outfall Sluice, and for conferring further Powers on the Commissioners, and for amending the Acts relating to them; and for other purposes.
Belfast Water Act 1874	37 & 38 Vict. c. cli	16 July 1874
An Act to confer further powers on the Belfast Water Commissioners; and for other purposes.
Local Government Board's Provisional Orders Confirmation Act 1874 (No. 4) or the Local Government Board's Provisional Orders Confirmation (No. 4) Act 1874	37 & 38 Vict. c. clii	30 July 1874
An Act to confirm certain Provisional Orders of the Local Government Board relating to the Districts of Brecon, Canterbury, East Barnet Valley, East Stonehouse, Gorleston, Hardingstone, Kingston-upon-Hull, Liverpool, Lytham, Merthyr Tydvil, Portsmouth, Road, Shipley, and Willesden.
	Brecon Order (1) 1874 Provisional Order to enable the Urban Sanitary Authority for the Borough of Brecon to put in force the Compulsory Clauses of the Lands Clauses Consolidation Act, 1845.	
	Brecon Order (2) 1874 Provisional Order for extending the Borrowing Powers of the Urban Sanitary Authority for the Borough of Brecon.	
	Canterbury Order 1874 Provisional Order to enable the Urban Sanitary Authority for the City and Borough of Canterbury to put in force the Compulsory Clauses of the Lands Clauses Consolidation Act, 1845.	
	East Barnet Valley Order 1874 Provisional Order for constituting the East Barnet Valley Urban Sanitary District.	
	East Stonehouse Order 1874 Provisional Order for partial Repeal and Alteration of Local Act. (Note: East Stonehouse Waterworks Act 1851 (14 & 15 Vict. c. cxi))	
	Gorleston and Southtown Order 1874 Provisional Order for dissolving the Local Government District of Gorleston and Southtown, in the Counties of Suffolk and Norfolk.	
	Hardingstone Order 1874 Provisional Order for extending the Local Government District of Hardingstone.	
	Kingston-upon-Hull Order 1874 Provisional Order to enable the Urban Sanitary Authority for the Borough of Kingston-upon-Hull to put in force the Compulsory Clauses of the Lands Clauses Consolidation Act, 1845.	
	Liverpool Order 1874 Port of Liverpool.	
	Lytham Order 1874 Provisional Order for altering a Local Act. (Note: Lytham Improvement Act 1847 (10 & 11 Vict. c. ccli))	
	Merthyr Tydfil Order 1874 Provisional Order to enable the Urban Sanitary Authority for the District of Merthyr Tydvil to put in force the Compulsory Clauses of the Lands Clauses Consolidation Act, 1845.	
	Portsmouth Order 1874 Provisional Order to enable the Urban Sanitary Authority for the Borough of Portsmouth to put in force the Compulsory Clauses of the Lands Clauses Consolidation Act, 1845.	
	Road Special Drainage District Order 1874 Provisional Order for dissolving the Road Special Drainage District, and for apportioning the liabilities thereof.	
	Shipley Order 1874 Provisional Order to enable the Urban Sanitary Authority for the District of Shipley to put in force the Compulsory Clauses of the Lands Clauses Consolidation Act, 1845.	
	Willesden Order 1874 Provisional Order for constituting the Willesden Urban Sanitary District.	
Education Department Provisional Order Confirmation Act (No. 2) 1874 or the Education Department Provisional Order Confirmation (No. 2) Act 1874	37 & 38 Vict. c. cliii	30 July 1874
An Act to confirm certain Provisional Orders made by the Education Department under "The Elementary Education Act, 1870," (Note: Elementary Education Act 1870 (33 & 34 Vict. c. 75)) to enable the School Boards for the borough of Brighton, the parish of Aberdare, and of the united school district of Caerhun, Llanbedr-y-Cennin, and Dolgarrog to put in force "The Lands Clauses Consolidation Act, 1845," and the Acts amending the same.
	Brighton Order 1874 The School Board for the Borough of Brighton, in the County of Sussex. Provisional Order for putting in force the Lands Clauses Consolidation Act, 1845.	
	Aberdare Order 1874 The School Board for the Parish of Aberdare, in the County of Glamorgan. Provisional Order for putting in force the Lands Clauses Consolidation Act, 1845.	
	Caerhun, Llanbedr-y-Cennin and Dolgarrog Order 1874 The School Board for the United School District of Caerhun, Llanbedr-y-Cennin, and Dolgarrog, County of Carnarvon. Provisional Order for putting in force the Lands Clauses Consolidation Act, 1845.	
Ulverston Local Board Act 1874	37 & 38 Vict. c. cliv	30 July 1874
An Act to empower the Local Board for the district of the town and hamlet of Ulverston, in the county of Lancaster, to acquire the Undertakings of the Ulverston Gas Company and of the Ulverston Water Company; and for other purposes.
Devon and Somerset Railway Act 1874	37 & 38 Vict. c. clv	30 July 1874
An Act for enabling the Devon and Somerset Railway Company to take Lands; to raise additional Capital; and for other purposes.
Edinburgh and District Waterworks (Additional Supply) Act 1874 (repealed)	37 & 38 Vict. c. clvi	30 July 1874
An Act to provide an additional supply of Water for the city of Edinburgh, the town and port of Leith, and town of Portobello, and districts and places adjacent, from Moorfoot, including the River South Esk and Tweeddale Bum and Portmore Loch, and by additional Storage in Glencorse Valley; to make further Regulations for prevention of Waste; to further suspend the period for constant Service; and for other purposes. (Repealed by Edinburgh Corporation Order Confirmation Act 1958 (7 & 8 Eliz. 2. c. v))
Great Northern and London and North-western Railway Companies (Joint Powers and New Lines) Act 1874 or the Great Northern and London and North-western Railways (Joint Powers and New Lines) Act 1874	37 & 38 Vict. c. clvii	30 July 1874
An Act to authorise the Great Northern and London and North-western Railway Companies to construct Railways between Market Harborough and Nottingham; to vest in the two Companies certain authorised Railways in Nottinghamshire and Leicestershire; to provide for the use by each of the two Companies of portions of their respective Undertakings; and for other purposes.
Great Northern Railway (Further Powers) Act 1874	37 & 38 Vict. c. clviii	30 July 1874
An Act to grant further powers to the Great Northern Railway Company with relation to their Undertaking; and for other purposes.
London and North-western Railway (England and Ireland) Act 1874	37 & 38 Vict. c. clix	30 July 1874
An Act for conferring additional powers on the London and North-western Railway Company in relation to their own Undertaking and the Undertakings of other Companies in England and Ireland; and for other purposes.
Midland Railway (Additional Powers) Act 1874	37 & 38 Vict. c. clx	30 July 1874
An Act for conferring additional powers on the Midland Railway Company for the construction of Works; for the raising of Capital; for the Consolidation of their Shares and Stocks; and for other purposes in relation to their own Undertaking and the Undertakings of other Companies.
South Western and Devon and Cornwall Railways Act 1874	37 & 38 Vict. c. clxi	30 July 1874
An Act for authorising a Sale and Transfer of parts of the Undertaking of the Devon and Cornwall Railway Company to the London and South-western Railway Company; and for other purposes.
Midland Railway (Hereford, Hay and Brecon Railway Lease) Act 1874	37 & 38 Vict. c. clxii	30 July 1874
An Act to lease the Hereford, Hay, and Brecon Railway to the Midland Railway Company; and for other purposes.
Sutton Harbour Act 1874	37 & 38 Vict. c. clxiii	30 July 1874
An Act to authorise the Sutton Harbour Improvement Company to convert part of the Harbour of Sutton Pool into a Dock; and for other purposes.
Cupar Water Act 1874	37 & 38 Vict. c. clxiv	30 July 1874
An Act for the better supplying with Water the parliamentary burgh of Cupar and places adjacent; and for other purposes.
Dundee Water (Additional Powers) Act 1874 (repealed)	37 & 38 Vict. c. clxv	30 July 1874
An Act for enabling the Dundee Water Commissioners to execute a deviation in the authorised aqueduct, conduit, or line of pipes from Lintrathen to Dundee, and to make a new Reservoir and other Works; and for other purposes. (Repealed by Dundee Corporation (Water, Transport, Finance, &c.) Order Confirmation Act 1954 (2 & 3 Eliz. 2. c.ix))
Blyth and Tyne Railway Act 1874	37 & 38 Vict. c. clxvi	30 July 1874
An Act to authorise the Blyth and Tyne Railway Company to extend their Warkworth Extension Railway to the Amble Branch of the North-eastern Railway; and for other purposes.
Kingstown Township Extension Act 1874	37 & 38 Vict. c. clxvii	30 July 1874
An Act for extending the boundary of the township of Kingstown; and for other purposes.
Bolton-le-Sands and Warton Reclamation Act 1874	37 & 38 Vict. c. clxviii	30 July 1874
An Act to authorise the construction of an Embankment in Morecambe Bay in the county of Lancaster; and for other purposes.
Cheshire Lines Act 1874	37 & 38 Vict. c. clxix	30 July 1874
An Act for enabling the Cheshire lines Committee to construct certain Branch Lines; for conferring further powers on the Committee and upon the three Companies represented on that Committee; and for other purposes.
Midland Railway (Swansea Vale Railway Lease) Act 1874	37 & 38 Vict. c. clxx	30 July 1874
An Act to lease the Swansea Vale Railway to the Midland Railway Company; and for other purposes.
Nettlebridge Valley Railway Act 1874 (repealed)	37 & 38 Vict. c. clxxi	30 July 1874
An Act for incorporating the Nettlebridge Valley Railway Company; and for other purposes. (Repealed by Nettlebridge Valley Railway (Abandonment) Act 1878 (41 & 42 Vict. c. lxxxv))
Ilen Valley Railway Act 1874	37 & 38 Vict. c. clxxii	30 July 1874
An Act to change the name of the Dunmanway and Skibbereen Railway Company and to confer upon them further powers; to enable the Cork and Bandon Railway Company to subscribe towards that Company's Undertaking, and to raise further money for that purpose and for the purpose of their own Undertaking; to authorise working and other agreements between the Company and certain other Railway Companies; and for other purposes.
Leominster and Bromyard Railway Act 1874	37 & 38 Vict. c. clxxiii	30 July 1874
An Act to incorporate a Company for making a Railway from the Shrewsbury and Hereford Railway at Leominster to join the Worcester, Bromyard, and Leominster Railway at Bromyard; and for other purposes.
Dungannon and Cookstown Railway Act 1874	37 & 38 Vict. c. clxxiv	30 July 1874
An Act for making a Railway from the Portadown, Dungannon, and Omagh Junction Railway, near the town of Dungannon, in the county of Tyrone, to the Belfast and Northern Counties Railway, near the town of Cookstown, in the same county; and for other purposes.
Bristol Port and Channel Dock Act 1874	37 & 38 Vict. c. clxxv	30 July 1874
An Act for extending the time for the construction of the authorised works of the Bristol Port and Channel Dock Company.
Burry Port and Gwendreath Valley Railway Amendment Act 1874	37 & 38 Vict. c. clxxvi	30 July 1874
An Act to extend the time granted to the Burry Port and Gwendreath Valley Railway Company for the completion of certain Railways.
Ealing Highways Act 1874 (repealed)	37 & 38 Vict. c. clxxvii	30 July 1874
An Act to repeal an Act of the seventh year of the reign of King George the Third, intituled "An Act for the more effectual repairing, widening, and rendering commodious the Highways within the parish of Ealing, in the county of Middlesex, and for lighting the Street in Old Brentford, within the said parish, from the turning towards Kew Bridge to a Street called 'The Half Acre,'" (Note: Ealing Roads Act 1766 (7 Geo. 3. c. 75)) and to make other and better provisions instead thereof with respect to the Highways in the parish of Ealing, in the county of Middlesex. (Repealed by Ministry of Health Provisional Order Confirmation (Ealing Extension) Act 1926 (16 & 17 Geo. 5. c. lxii))
Falmouth Docks Act 1874 (repealed)	37 & 38 Vict. c. clxxviii	30 July 1874
An Act to authorise the Falmouth Docks Company to complete parts of their Undertaking; to make and maintain additional works, and to raise further moneys; and for other purposes. (Repealed by Falmouth Docks Act 1959 (7 & 8 Eliz. 2. c. xl))
Fal Valley Railway Act 1874	37 & 38 Vict. c. clxxix	30 July 1874
An Act to authorise the construction in Cornwall of Railways to be called The Fal Valley Railway; and for other purposes.
Mersey Railway Act 1874	37 & 38 Vict. c. clxxx	30 July 1874
An Act to authorise an extension of time to the Mersey Railway Company for purchasing land and completing their Railway; and for other purposes.
Gloucester and Berkeley Canal Act 1874	37 & 38 Vict. c. clxxxi	30 July 1874
An Act for vesting in the Gloucester and Berkeley Canal Company the Undertaking of the Company of Proprietors of the Worcester and Birmingham Canal Navigation; and for other purposes.
Local Government Board's Provisional Orders Confirmation Act 1874 (No. 5) or the Local Government Board's Provisional Orders Confirmation (No. 5) Act 1874	37 & 38 Vict. c. clxxxii	7 August 1874
An Act to confirm certain Provisional Orders of the Local Government Board relating to the Districts of Bognor, Brentford, Hitchin, Leicester, Mansfield, Oxford, the Ware Union, and Wrexham.
	Bognor Order 1874 Provisional Order for extending the Local Government District of Bognor.	
	Brentford Order 1874 Provisional Order for constituting the Brentford Urban Sanitary District.	
	Hitchin Order 1874 Provisional Order for altering a confirming Act. (Note: Local Government Board's Provisional Orders Confirmation Act 1873 (No. 2) (36 & 37 Vict. c. lxxxii))	
	Leicester Order 1874 Provisional Order to enable the Urban Sanitary Authority for the Borough of Leicester to put in force the Compulsory Clauses of the Lands Clauses Consolidation Act, 1845.	
	Mansfield Order 1874 Provisional Order for partially repealing and altering a Local Act. (Note: Mansfield Improvement Act 1823 (4 Geo. 4. c. xcii))	
	Oxford Order 1874	
	Ware Union Order 1874 Provisional Order to enable the Rural Sanitary Authority for the Ware Union to put in force the Compulsory Clauses of the Lands Clauses Consolidation Act, 1845.	
	Wrexham Order 1874 Provisional Order to enable the Urban Sanitary Authority for the Borough of Wrexham to put in force the Compulsory Clauses of the Lands Clauses Consolidation Act, 1845.	
Tramways Orders Confirmation Act 1874	37 & 38 Vict. c. clxxxiii	7 August 1874
An Act for confirming certain Provisional Orders made by the Board of Trade under the Tramways Act, 1870, (Note: Tramways Act 1870 (33 & 34 Vict. c. 78)) relating to Birmingham, London Street Tramways, Newbury and Lamborne, Portsmouth Street Tramways, Wantage, and Wirral.
	Birmingham (Corporation) Tramways Order 1874 Order to amend the Birmingham (Corporation) Tramways Order, 1872.	
	London Street Tramways (Junction Road Extensions) Order 1874 Order authorising the London Street Tramways Company to construct additional Street Tramways in the Parishes of St. Pancras and St. Mary, Islington, in the county of Middlesex.	
	Newbury and Lamborne Tramway Order 1874 Order authorising the Construction of Tramways from Newbury to Lamborne, in the county of Berks.	
	Portsmouth Street Tramways (Extensions) Order 1874 Order authorising the Portsmouth Street Tramways Company to construct additional Street Tramways in the parish of Portsea and county of Southampton.	
	Wantage Tramways Order 1874 Order authorising the construction of a Tramway from the Wantage Road Station of the Great Western Railway to the town of Wantage, both in the county of Berks, with junctions thereto.	
	Wirral Tramways Order 1874 Order authorising the construction of Tramways in the extraparochial chapelry of Birkenhead, and in the townships of Tranmere, Higher Bebington, and Lower Bebington, all in the parish of Bebington and county of Chester.	
Education Department Provisional Order Confirmation Act (No. 1) 1874 or the Education Department Provisional Order Confirmation (No. 1) Act 1874	37 & 38 Vict. c. clxxxiv	7 August 1874
An Act to confirm a Provisional Order made by the Education Department under "The Elementary Education Act, 1870," to enable the School Board for London to put in force "The Lands Clauses Consolidation Act, 1845," and the Acts amending the same.
	London Order 1874 The School Board for London. Provisional Order for putting in force the Lands Clauses Consolidation Act, 1845.	
Pier and Harbour Orders Confirmation Act 1874	37 & 38 Vict. c. clxxxv	7 August 1874
An Act to confirm, with Amendments, certain Provisional Orders made by the Board of Trade under The General Pier and Harbour Act, 1861, (Note: General Pier and Harbour Act 1861 (24 & 25 Vict. c. 45)) relating to Bray, Buckie (Cluny), Carlingford Lough, Cattewater, Eyemouth, Great Yarmouth, Kinsale, Lybster, Sandown, Sidmouth, Tees, and Yarmouth (Isle of Wight).
	Bray Pier Order 1874 Order for the construction, maintenance, and regulation of a Pier at Bray, in the county of Wicklow.	
	Buckie (Cluny) Harbour Order 1874 Order for the construction, maintenance, and regulation of Piers, Harbour, and Works at the fishing village of Buckie, in the parish of Rathven, and county of Banff.	
	Harbour of Carlingford Lough Improvement Order 1874 Order for the Amendment of the Harbour of Carlingford Lough Improvement Orders, 1864 and 1868.	
	Cattewater Harbour Order 1874 Order for the construction, maintenance, and regulation of a Breakwater and Pier on the Batten Reef of Rocks at the entrance of Cattewater in the port of Plymouth, and of approach roads thereto, and of the harbour of Cattewater, in the county of Devon,	
	Eyemouth Harbour Order 1874 Order for amending the Act (Note: Eyemouth Harbour Act 1839 (2 & 3 Vict. c. xxxvi)) with respect to the Harbour of Eyemouth, in the county of Berwick, and for making further provision in regard to the said Harbour.	
	Great Yarmouth Port and Haven Order 1874 Order for the construction of works in connexion with the South Pier at Great Yarmouth, and to amend the Great Yarmouth Port and Haven Act, 1866. (Note: Great Yarmouth Port and Haven Act 1866 (29 & 30 Vict. c. ccxlvii))	
	Kinsale Harbour Order 1874 Order for amending "The Kinsale Harbour Order, 1870."	
	Lybster Harbour Order 1874 Order for power to levy rates, and for the confirmation of certain existing arrangements with reference to the Harbour of Lybster, in the parish of Latheron, in the county of Caithness.	
	Sandown Pier Order 1874 Order for the construction, maintenance, and regulation of a Pier at Sandown, in the Isle of Wight.	
	Sidmouth Piers Order 1874 Order for the construction, maintenance, and regulation of Piers, Landing-places, and other works at Sidmouth, in the parish of Salcombe Regis, in the county of Devon.	
	Tees Conservancy Order 1874 Order for extending the time for the completion of Graving Dock authorised by the Tees Conservancy Act, 1867. (Note: Tees Conservancy Act 1867 (30 & 31 Vict. c. l))	
	Yarmouth (Isle of Wight) Pier Order 1874 Order for the construction, maintenance, and regulation of a Pier and other works at Yarmouth, in the Isle of Wight and county of Southampton.	
Local Government Board (Ireland) Provisional Order (Dublin) Confirmation Act 1874	37 & 38 Vict. c. clxxxvi	7 August 1874
An Act to confirm a Provisional Order made by the Local Government Board for Ireland relating to the City of Dublin.
	Dublin Order 1874 Dublin Corporation Waterworks and Fire Brigade. Provisional Order.	
Harrow and Rickmansworth Railway Act 1874 (repealed)	37 & 38 Vict. c. clxxxvii	7 August 1874
An Act for incorporating the Harrow and Rickmansworth Railway Company, and authorising them to make and maintain the Harrow and Rickmansworth Railway; and for other purposes. (Repealed by Harrow and Rickmansworth Railway (Abandonment) Act 1877 (40 & 41 Vict. c. ccxxxii))
Saint Austell and Pentewan Railway, Harbour, and Dock Act 1874	37 & 38 Vict. c. clxxxviii	7 August 1874
An Act for incorporating the Saint Austell and Pentewan Railway, Harbour, and Dock Company; and for other purposes.
Temple Mineral Railway Act 1874 (repealed)	37 & 38 Vict. c. clxxxix	7 August 1874
An Act for incorporating the Temple Mineral Railway Company, and authorising them to make and maintain the Temple Mineral Railway; and for authorising arrangements between them and other Railway Companies; and for other purposes. (Repealed by Temple Mineral Railway (Abandonment) Act 1877 (40 & 41 Vict. c. lv))
Worcester and Aberystwyth Junction Railway Act 1874 (repealed)	37 & 38 Vict. c. cxc	7 August 1874
An Act to incorporate a Company for making a Railway from the Kington and Eardisley Railway at New Radnor, to join the Mid-Wales Railway at Rhayader; and for other purposes. (Repealed by Worcester and Aberystwyth Junction Railway (Abandonment) Act 1880 (43 & 44 Vict. c. xii))
Bodmin and Wadebridge Railway (Deviations) Act 1874	37 & 38 Vict. c. cxci	7 August 1874
An Act for enabling the Bodmin and Wadebridge Railway Company to exercise the powers of altering and improving the Bodmin and Wadebridge Railway contained in "The Bodmin and Wadebridge and Delabole Railway Act, 1873;" (Note: Bodmin and Wadebridge and Delabole Railway Act 1873 (36 & 37 Vict. c. ccxlix)) and for other purposes.
North-eastern Railway (Blyth and Tyne Transfer) Act 1874	37 & 38 Vict. c. cxcii	7 August 1874
An Act for vesting the Undertaking of the Blyth and Tyne Railway Company in the North-eastern Railway Company.
Wakefield Waterworks Act 1874 (repealed)	37 & 38 Vict. c. cxciii	7 August 1874
An Act to authorise the Wakefield Waterworks Company to raise more Money; and for other purposes. (Repealed by West Yorkshire Act 1980 (c. xiv))
Nottingham Improvement Act 1874	37 & 38 Vict. c. cxciv	7 August 1874
An Act for defining and extending the powers of the Corporation of Nottingham in relation to the Management of Streets in the Borough, and to Sewerage, and to Markets and Fairs, and to Police and other matters of Local Government; and for other purposes.
Brading Harbour Improvement, Railway and Works Act 1874	37 & 38 Vict. c. cxcv	7 August 1874
An Act for making an Embankment and Landing Quays at Brading Harbour, and a Railway in connexion therewith; and for other purposes.
Southern Railway (Further Powers) Act 1874 (repealed)	37 & 38 Vict. c. cxcvi	7 August 1874
An Act to empower the Southern Railway Company to raise further Capital; and for other purposes. (Repealed by Statute Law (Repeals) Act 2013 (c. 2))
Fareham Railway Act 1874 (repealed)	37 & 38 Vict. c. cxcvii	7 August 1874
An Act for the making of a Railway from the London and South-western Railway near the Fareham Station to Hill Head Harbour in the parish of Titchfield in the county of Southampton; and for other purposes. (Repealed by Fareham Railway Abandonment Act 1877 (40 & 41 Vict. c. xli))
East and West Junction Railway Act 1874	37 & 38 Vict. c. cxcviii	7 August 1874
An Act for empowering the East and West Junction Railway Company to raise further Money by Debenture Stock; with a special preference or priority attached thereto; and for other purposes.
Metropolitan Inner Circle Completion Act 1874	37 & 38 Vict. c. cxcix	7 August 1874
An Act for the making of Railways for completing the Metropolitan Inner Circle, and for the Construction and Improvement of Streets in the City of London; and for other purposes.
Ballymena and Larne Railway Act 1874	37 & 38 Vict. c. cc	7 August 1874
An Act to authorise the construction of Railways in the county of Antrim to connect the Port of Lame with the Town of Ballymena; and for other purposes.

=== Private acts ===
Short title	Citation	Royal assent
Long title
Power's Estate Act 1874	37 & 38 Vict. c. 1 Pr.	30 June 1874
An Act to authorise the Trustees of the Settlement of the Property of Dame Florence Anne Maria Power, the wife of Sir Richard Crampton Power, Baronet, executed on her Marriage with the said Sir Richard Crampton Power, to lay out the Moneys to arise under the exercise of the Powers of Sale and Exchange contained in such settlement in the purchase of Estates in Ireland, and also in paying off Incumbrances affecting the Estates in Ireland comprised in a settlement executed by Sir John Power, deceased, on the said Marriage, or portions of such Estates.
Chadwick's Estate Act 1874	37 & 38 Vict. c. 2 Pr.	16 July 1874
An Act to enable the Trustees of the Will of Joseph Chadwick, late of Cinder Hills in Mirfield in the county of York, Gentleman, deceased, to sell all or any part of the real Estates subject to the Trusts of the said Will, and to lay out the purchase moneys in the discharge of Incumbrances or in the purchase of other Estates in England or Wales; and to grant Leases of any part of the said Estates for the time being unsold; and for other purposes.
Halford's Estate Act 1874	37 & 38 Vict. c. 3 Pr.	16 July 1874
An Act to enable the Trustees of the Will and Codicils of the Reverend Thomas Halford, late of Hanover Square in the county of Middlesex, Clerk, deceased, to sell certain Farms, Lands, and Hereditaments in the counties of Cambridge, Norfolk, and the Isle of Ely; and to lay out the purchase moneys, and a certain accumulated Fund standing in their Names, in the purchase of an Estate in England; and for other purposes.
Hay's Estate Act 1874	37 & 38 Vict. c. 4 Pr.	16 July 1874
An Act to authorise the Trustees of the deceased John Hay, of Letham Grange in the county of Forfar, to sell the Lands comprised in his Trust Disposition and Settlement; to pay his Debts; to invest the residue of the price; and for other purposes.
Boulton Estate Act 1874	37 & 38 Vict. c. 5 Pr.	16 July 1874
An Act for confirming certain Building Leases granted by Matthew Piers Watt Boulton, Esquire, of certain Lands in the parishes of Handsworth and Birmingham in the county of Warwick, or one of them, which are subject to the uses of the Will of the late Matthew Robinson Boulton, Esquire; and for authorising Building and Mining and other Leases of the Estates, subject to the uses of the same Will; and for other purposes; and of which the short title is "The Boulton Estate Act, 1874."
Leigh's Estate Act 1874	37 & 38 Vict. c. 6 Pr.	16 July 1874
An Act to amend and extend an Act (Note: Leigh's Estate Act 1853 (16 & 17 Vict. c. 9 Pr.)) passed in the year one thousand eight hundred and fifty-three, relative to the Estate devised by the Will of Sir Robert Holt Leigh, Baronet; deceased.
Tichbourne and Doughty Estates Act 1874	37 & 38 Vict. c. 7 Pr.	16 July 1874
An Act to authorise the raising of certain Moneys on the Security of certain Estates in the county of Southampton, commonly known as the Tichborne Estates, and in the counties of Middlesex, Lincoln, Buckingham, and Dorset, commonly known as the Doughty Estates; and for other purposes.
Lord Tredegar's Supplemental Estate Act 1874	37 & 38 Vict. c. 8 Pr.	30 July 1874
An Act to enable the Trustees of the Settlement of Lord Tredegar's Family Estates to take further Shares in the Alexandra (Newport) Dock Company, and for other purposes, and of which the short title is "Lord Tredegar's Supplemental Estate Act, 1874."
Withdean Estate Act 1874	37 & 38 Vict. c. 9 Pr.	7 August 1874
An Act for amending and extending the Act passed in the 12th and 13th years of the reign of Her present Majesty, intituled "An Act for enabling the Trustees of the Settlement made under orders of the High Court of Chancery after the marriage of Chaloner Ogle, Esquire, and Eliza Sophia Frances Ogle his wife, to grant building, improving, and other leases of certain estates and hereditaments situate at Patcham in the county of Sussex, comprised in the said Settlement." (Note: Withdean Estate Act 1849 (12 & 13 Vict. c. 11 Pr.))

=== Sources ===
- The Public General Statutes passed in the Thirty-Seventh and Thirty-Eighth Years of the Reign of Her Majesty Queen Victoria, 1874. Vol. 9. London: Eyre and Spottiswoode. 1874 – via Internet Archive.
- The Public General Statutes passed in the Thirty-Seventh and Thirty-Eighth Years of the Reign of Her Majesty Queen Victoria, 1874. Vol. 9. London: Eyre and Spottiswoode. 1874 – via Google Books.
- Local and Personal Laws – via Google Books.
- Local and Personal Laws – via Google Books.

== See also ==
- List of acts of the Parliament of the United Kingdom
