= Statute Law Revision Act 1883 =

Act of the Parliament of the United Kingdom

Statute Law Revision Act 1883 (Note: Section 2.)
- Act of Parliament
- Parliament of the United Kingdom
- Long title: An Act for further promoting the Revision of the Statute Law by repealing certain Enactments which have ceased to be in force or have become unnecessary.
- Citation: 46 & 47 Vict. c. 39
- Introduced by: Roundell Palmer, 1st Baron Selborne (Lords)
- Territorial extent: United Kingdom

Dates
- Royal assent: 25 August 1883
- Commencement: 25 August 1883 (Note: The Acts of Parliament (Commencement) Act 1793.)
Other legislation
Amends	See § Repealed enactments
Repeals/revokes	See § Repealed enactments
Amended by	Statute Law Revision Act 1898
Relates to	Repeal of Obsolete Statutes Act 1856; See Statute Law Revision Act

Status: Partially repealed

History of passage through Parliament

Records of Parliamentary debate relating to the statute from Hansard

Text of statute as originally enacted

The Statute Law Revision Act 1883 (46 & 47 Vict. c. 39) is an act of the Parliament of the United Kingdom that repealed for the United Kingdom enactments from 1707 to 1868 which had ceased to be in force or had become necessary. The act was intended, in particular, to facilitate the preparation of the revised edition of the statutes, then in progress.

As of 2026, the act remains partly in force in the United Kingdom.

== Background ==
In the United Kingdom, acts of Parliament remain in force until expressly repealed. Blackstone's Commentaries on the Laws of England, published in the late 18th-century, raised questions about the system and structure of the common law and the poor drafting and disorder of the existing statute book.

From 1810 to 1825, the The Statutes of the Realm was published, providing the first authoritative collection of acts. The first statute law revision act was not passed until 1856 with the Repeal of Obsolete Statutes Act 1856 (19 & 20 Vict. c. 64). This approach — focusing on removing obsolete laws from the statute book followed by consolidation — was proposed by Peter Locke King MP, who had been highly critical of previous commissions' approaches, expenditures, and lack of results.

Previous Acts
Year passed	Title	Citation	Effect
1861	Statute Law Revision Act 1861	24 & 25 Vict. c. 101	Repealed or amended over 800 enactments
1863	Statute Law Revision Act 1863	26 & 27 Vict. c. 125	Repealed or amended over 1,600 enactments for England and Wales
1867	Statute Law Revision Act 1867	30 & 31 Vict. c. 59	Repealed or amended over 1,380 enactments
1870	Statute Law Revision Act 1870	33 & 34 Vict. c. 69	Repealed or amended over 250 enactments
1871	Promissory Oaths Act 1871	34 & 35 Vict. c. 48	Repealed or amended almost 200 enactments
1871	Statute Law Revision Act 1871	34 & 35 Vict. c. 116	Repealed or amended over 1,060 enactments
1872	Statute Law Revision Act 1872	35 & 36 Vict. c. 63	Repealed or amended almost 490 enactments
1872	Statute Law (Ireland) Revision Act 1872	35 & 36 Vict. c. 98	Repealed or amended over 1,050 enactments
1872	Statute Law Revision Act 1872 (No. 2)	35 & 36 Vict. c. 97	Repealed or amended almost 260 enactments
1873	Statute Law Revision Act 1873	36 & 37 Vict. c. 91	Repealed or amended 1,225 enactments
1874	Statute Law Revision Act 1874	37 & 38 Vict. c. 35	Repealed or amended over 490 enactments
1874	Statute Law Revision Act 1874 (No. 2)	37 & 38 Vict. c. 96	Repealed or amended almost 470 enactments
1875	Statute Law Revision Act 1875	38 & 39 Vict. c. 66	Repealed or amended over 1,400 enactments
1876	Statute Law Revision (Substituted Enactments) Act 1876	39 & 40 Vict. c. 20	Updated references to repealed acts
1878	Statute Law Revision (Ireland) Act 1878	41 & 42 Vict. c. 57	Repealed or amended over 460 enactments passed by the Parliament of Ireland
1878	Statute Law Revision Act 1878	41 & 42 Vict. c. 79	Repealed or amended over 90 enactments.
1879	Statute Law Revision (Ireland) Act 1879	42 & 43 Vict. c. 24	Repealed or amended over 460 enactments passed by the Parliament of Ireland
1879	Civil Procedure Acts Repeal Act 1879	42 & 43 Vict. c. 59	Repealed or amended over 130 enactments
1881	Statute Law Revision and Civil Procedure Act 1881	44 & 45 Vict. c. 59	Repealed or amended or amended almost 100 enactments relating to civil procedure.

== Passage ==
The bill had its first reading in the House of Lords on 3 August 1883, introduced by the Lord Chancellor, Roundell Palmer, 1st Baron Selborne. The bill had its second reading in the House of Lords on 7 August 1883 and was committed to a committee of the whole house, which met and reported on 9 August 1883, with amendments. The amended bill had its third reading in the House of Lords on 13 August 1883 and passed, with amendments.

The amended bill had its first reading in the House of Commons on 14 August 1883. The bill had its second reading in the House of Commons on 16 August 1883 and was committed to a committee of the whole house, which met and reported on 18 August 1883, without amendments. The bill had its third reading in the House of Commons on 18 August 1883 and passed, without amendments.

The bill was granted royal assent on 25 August 1883.

== Subsequent developments ==
The preamble, and the schedule, to the act were repealed by section 1 of, and the first part of the schedule to, the Statute Law Revision Act 1898 (61 & 62 Vict. c. 22), which came into force on 25 July 1898.

The enactments which were repealed (whether for the whole or any part of the United Kingdom) by the act were repealed so far as they extended to the Isle of Man by section 1(1) of, and schedule 1 to, the Statute Law Revision (Isle of Man) Act 1991, which came into force on 25 July 1991.

The act was retained for the Republic of Ireland by section 2(2)(a) of, and part 4 of schedule 1 to, the Statute Law Revision Act 2007, which came into force on 8 May 2007.

== Repealed enactments ==
Section 1 of the act repealed 477 enactments, listed in the schedule to the act, across six categories: (Note: The Note of the bill, unlike the schedule, gives commentary on each act, noting any earlier repeals and the reason for the new repeal.)

- Expired
- Spent
- Repealed in general terms
- Virtually repealed
- Superseded
- Obsolete

Section 1 of the act included several safeguards to ensure that the repeal does not negatively affect existing rights or ongoing legal matters. Specifically, any legal rights, privileges, or remedies already obtained under the repealed laws, as well as any legal proceedings or principles established by them, remain unaffected. Section 1 of the act also ensured that repealed enactments that have been incorporated into other laws would continue to have legal effect in those contexts. Moreover, the repeal would not revive any former rights, offices, or jurisdictions that had already been abolished.

Citation	Short title	Title	Extent of repeal
32 & 33 Vict. c. 1	Consolidated Fund (8,406,272l. 13s. 4d.) Act	An Act to apply certain Sums out of the Consolidated Fund to the Service of the years ending the Thirty-first Day of March, One thousand eight hundred and sixty-eight, One thousand eight hundred and sixty-nine, and One thousand eight hundred and seventy.	The whole act.
32 & 33 Vict. c. 4	Mutiny Act 1869	An Act for punishing Mutiny and Desertion, and for the better payment of the Army and their Quarters.	The whole act.
32 & 33 Vict. c. 5	Marine Mutiny Act 1869	An Act for the Regulation of Her Majesty's Royal Marine Forces while on Shore.	The whole act.
32 & 33 Vict. c. 6	Railway Companies Meetings Act 1869	An Act to repeal so much of the Regulation of Railways Act, 1868, as relates to the approval by Meetings of incorporated Railway Companies of Bills and Certificates for conferring further powers on those Companies.	The whole act.
32 & 33 Vict. c. 8	Consolidated Fund (£17,100,000) Act	An Act to apply the Sum of Seventeen million one hundred thousand Pounds out of the Consolidated Fund to the Service of the Year ending the thirty-first day of March, One thousand eight hundred and seventy.	The whole act.
32 & 33 Vict. c. 10	Colonial Prisoners Removal Act 1869	An Act for authorising the Removal of Prisoners from One Colony to another for the purposes of Punishment.	Sections Three and Eight. Repealed as to all Her Majesty's Dominions.
32 & 33 Vict. c. 11	Merchant Shipping (Colonial) Act 1869	An Act for amending the Law relating to the Coasting Trade and Merchant Shipping in British Possessions.	Repealed as to all Her Majesty's Dominions.
32 & 33 Vict. c. 14	Revenue Act 1869	An Act to grant certain Duties of Customs and Inland Revenue and to repeal and alter other Duties of Customs and Inland Revenue.	Sections One to Fourteen, Sixteen, Seventeen, and Thirty-four to Thirty-nine. Schedules (A.) to (E.).
32 & 33 Vict. c. 15	Pensioners Civil Disabilities Relief Act 1869	An Act to remove Doubts as to the Qualification of Persons holding Civil Service Pensions, or receiving Superannuation Allowances, to sit in Parliament.	Section Two from "or of" to end of that section.
32 & 33 Vict. c. 16	Norfolk Island Bishopric Act 1869	An Act to amend so much of the Act of the Session of the Sixth and Seventh Years of the Reign of Her present Majesty, chapter Thirty-five, as provides that Norfolk Island is to be part of the Diocese of Tasmania.	Repealed as to all Her Majesty's Dominions.
32 & 33 Vict. c. 18	Lands Clauses Consolidation Act 1869	An Act to amend the Lands Clauses Consolidation Act.	Section Two.
32 & 33 Vict. c. 19	Stannaries Act 1869	An Act for amending the Law relating to Mining Partnerships within the Stannaries of Devon and Cornwall, and to the Court of the Vice-Warden of the Stannaries.	Section Thirty-nine to "be it enacted, that".
32 & 33 Vict. c. 20	Oxford University Statutes Act 1869	An Act to remove Doubts as to the Validity of certain Statutes made by the Convocation of the University of Oxford.	The whole act.
32 & 33 Vict. c. 22	Exchequer Bonds Act 1869	An Act for raising the Sum of Two million three hundred thousand Pounds by Exchequer Bonds for the Service of the Year ending on the Thirty-first day of March, One thousand eight hundred and seventy.	The whole act.
32 & 33 Vict. c. 24	Newspapers, Printers, and Reading Rooms Repeal Act 1869	An Act to repeal certain Enactments relating to Newspapers, Pamphlets, and other Publications, and to Printers, Typefounders, and Reading Rooms.	Section One from "and this" to end of that section.
32 & 33 Vict. c. 27	Wine and Beerhouse Act 1869	An Act to amend the Law for licensing Beer-houses, and to make certain Alterations with respect to the Sale by retail of Beer, Cider, and Wine.	Sections Ten and Twenty-one. The Second Schedule.
32 & 33 Vict. c. 29	India (Inam Lands) Act 1869	An Act to render valid certain Title Deeds for Inam Lands.	Repealed as to all Her Majesty's Dominions.
32 & 33 Vict. c. 33	Judicial Statistics (Scotland) Act 1869	An Act to provide for the Collection of Judicial Statistics in Scotland.	Section Six.
32 & 33 Vict. c. 34	Stipendiary Magistrates' Act 1869	An Act to amend the Law concerning the Appointment of Deputies by Stipendiary Magistrates.	Section One.
32 & 33 Vict. c. 37	Common Pleas at Lancaster Amendment Act 1869	An Act to authorise the Appointment of District Prothonotaries of the Court of Common Pleas of the County Palatine of Lancaster, and to provide for the better Despatch of Business therein.	The whole act.
32 & 33 Vict. c. 39	Endowed Institutions (Scotland) Act 1869	An Act to make provision for the better Government and Administration of Hospitals and other endowed Institutions in Scotland.	The whole act.
32 & 33 Vict. c. 41	Poor Rate Assessment and Collection Act 1869	An Act for amending the Law with respect to the Rating of Occupiers for short terms, and the making and collecting of the Poor's Rate.	Section Sixteen from "and the twelfth" to the end of that section.
32 & 33 Vict. c. 43	Diplomatic Salaries, &c. Act 1869	An Act to provide for the Payment of Diplomatic Salaries, Allowances, and Pensions.	Section Four, the first paragraph.
32 & 33 Vict. c. 44	Greenwich Hospital Act 1869	An Act to make better Provision respecting Greenwich Hospital, and the Application of the Revenues thereof.	Sections Two, Ten, and Twelve. The Schedule.
32 & 33 Vict. c. 45	Union Loans Act 1869	An Act to amend the Law relating to the Repayment of Loans to Poor Law Unions.	Section Six to "thenceforth" and from "(Seal of the Poor Law Board)" to "eight hundred and".
32 & 33 Vict. c. 47	High Constables Act 1869	An Act to provide for the Discharge of the Duties heretofore performed by High Constables, and for the Abolition of such Office, with certain exceptions.	Section Six.
32 & 33 Vict. c. 53	Cinque Ports Act 1869	An Act to amend the Cinque Ports Act.	Sections Two, Three, and Five.
32 & 33 Vict. c. 54	Poor Relief (Ireland) Act 1869	An Act to amend the Act of the first and second years of Victoria, chapter Fifty-six, intituled "An Act for the more effectual Relief of the destitute Poor in Ireland".	Section One from "or if" to "prosecuted". Sections Two and Four.
32 & 33 Vict. c. 58	Public Schools Act 1869	An Act for amending the Public Schools Act, 1868.	The Preamble. Section One.
32 & 33 Vict. c. 59	Savings Bank Investment Act 1869	An Act to amend the Laws relating to the Investments for Saving Banks and Post Office Savings Banks.	Section Two from "from time" to "such annuities". Sections Three and Eight. The Schedules.
32 & 33 Vict. c. 62	Debtors Act 1869	An Act for the Abolition of Imprisonment for Debt, for the Punishment of Fraudulent Debtors, and for other purposes.	Section Seven.
32 & 33 Vict. c. 63	Metropolitan Poor Amendment Act 1869	An Act to amend the Metropolitan Poor Act, 1867.	Section One from "and so much" to "repealed;". Section Five from "and the seventeenth" to end of that section. Section Eight from "but this" to end of that section. Section Nine to "repealed, and". Sections Ten and Twenty.
32 & 33 Vict. c. 65	Corrupt Practices, Dublin City Act 1869	An Act for appointing Commissioners to Inquire into the Existence of Corrupt Practices amongst the Freemen Electors of the City of Dublin.	The whole act.
32 & 33 Vict. c. 67	Valuation (Metropolis) Act 1869	An Act to provide for Uniformity in the Assessment of Rateable Property in the Metropolis.	Section Seventy-seven to "to this Act and", the word "other" (where it next occurs), the proviso, and the Fifth Schedule except as to the repeal of so much of any Act as applies the provisions thereby repealed of 25 & 26 Vict. c. 102.
32 & 33 Vict. c. 68	Evidence Further Amendment Act 1869	An Act for the further Amendment of the Law of Evidence.	Section One.
32 & 33 Vict. c. 71	Bankruptcy Act 1869	An Act to Consolidate and Amend the Law of Bankruptcy.	Section Sixty-one, the second paragraph. Section Sixty-eight from "whether the same" to "appropriated and". Section One hundred and twenty-eight. Section One hundred and twenty-nine from "The Lord Chancellor may by order make" to "made by the Lord Chancellor." Section One hundred and thirty, the first paragraph. Section One hundred and thirty-two.
32 & 33 Vict. c. 78	Criminal Lunatics Act 1869	An Act to amend the Law relating to Criminal Lunatics.	Section Two from "and all orders" to "valid accordingly;".
32 & 33 Vict. c. 82	Metropolitan Building Act 1869	An Act to amend the Metropolitan Building Act, 1855.	Section Six. The Schedule.
32 & 33 Vict. c. 83	Bankruptcy Repeal and Insolvent Court Act 1869	An Act to provide for the Winding-up of the Business of the late Court for the Relief of Insolvent Debtors in England, and to repeal Enactments relating to Insolvency, Bankruptcy, Imprisonment for Debt, and matters connected therewith.	Sections Eleven and Twenty. The Schedule.
32 & 33 Vict. c. 85	Expiring Laws Continuance Act 1869	An Act to continue various Expiring Laws.	The whole act.
32 & 33 Vict. c. 90	Annual Turnpike Acts Continuance Act 1869	An Act to continue certain Turnpike Acts in Great Britain, to repeal certain other Turnpike Acts, and to make further Provisions concerning Turnpike Roads.	Except Sections Seven and Eight.
32 & 33 Vict. c. 91	Courts of Justice (Salaries and Funds) Act 1869	An Act for amending the Law relating to the Salaries, Expenses, and Funds of Courts of Law in England.	Section Eight, from "and all moneys" to end of that section. Section Nine. Section Twelve, so far as it relates to the Fourth Schedule. Section Thirty to "said governor and company." Section Thirty-one from "and such accounts" to end of that section. Section Thirty-three from "and for enforcing" to "under this Act,". Section Thirty-four. The Third Schedule, Part I. the words "Lords Justices of Appeal," and Part II. the words "gentleman of the chamber, purse bearer", and "and messenger to Great Seal". The Fourth Schedule, Part I. The Fifth Schedule.
32 & 33 Vict. c. 92	Fisheries (Ireland) Act 1869	An Act to amend the Laws relating to the Fisheries of Ireland.	Schedule A. so far as it relates to 9 & 10 Vict. c. 114. Schedule B. so far as it relates to 10 & 11 Vict. c. 75.
32 & 33 Vict. c. 93	Appropriation Act 1869	An Act to apply a Sum out of the Consolidated Fund and the Surplus of Ways and Means to the service of the year ending the Thirty-first day of March One thousand eight hundred and seventy, and to appropriate the Supplies granted in this Session of Parliament.	The whole act.
32 & 33 Vict. c. 96	Contagious Diseases Act 1869	An Act to amend the Contagious Diseases Act, 1866.	Section Four from "provided that all" to end of that section. Section Twelve.
32 & 33 Vict. c. 97	Government of India Act 1869	An Act to amend in certain respects the Act for the better Government of India.	Section Five. Section Eight from "which" to "meeting".
32 & 33 Vict. c. 98	Indian Councils Act 1869	An Act to define the Powers of the Governor General of India in Council at Meetings for making Laws and Regulations for certain Purposes.	Section Two. Repealed as to all Her Majesty's Dominions.
32 & 33 Vict. c. 100	Sanitary Loans Act 1869	An Act to facilitate the borrowing Money in certain Cases for the purpose of the Sanitary Act, 1866, and the Acts amending the same; and for other purposes.	Section Three, so far as it relates to a sewer authority and a local board. Section Nine, the words and figures "the Local Government Act, 1858" (where they first occur) and "the Sewage Utilization Acts, 1865, 1867". Repealed except as to the parish of Woolwich.
32 & 33 Vict. c. 102	Metropolitan Board of Works (Loans) Act 1869	An Act for making further provision respecting the borrowing of Money by the Metropolitan Board of Works, and for other purposes connected therewith.	Section Twelve. Section Sixteen, paragraph (5). Section Eighteen. Section Forty-six, paragraph (7). Section Fifty. The Third Schedule.
32 & 33 Vict. c. 103	Customs and Excise Warehousing Act 1869	An Act to amend the Law relating to the Warehousing of Wines and Spirits in Customs and Excise Warehouses, and for other purposes relating to Customs and Inland Revenue.	Sections Two to Six. Section Seven, the words "customs or" (wherever they occur) from "For Goods" to "goods - - 0 5 0" and from "according" to end of that section. Sections Eight to Sixteen.
32 & 33 Vict. c. 108	Sanitary Act 1866 Amendment Act 1869	An Act to amend "The Sanitary Act, 1866," so far as the same relates to Ireland.	The whole act.
32 & 33 Vict. c. 109	Residence of Incumbents Act 1869	An Act the title of which begins with the words,—An Act for repealing part of an Act of the first year of the Reign of their Majesties King William and Queen Mary,—and ends with the words,—benefices, and to the Penalties and Forfeitures consequent on non-residence.	Section One.
32 & 33 Vict. c. 110	Charitable Trusts Act 1869	An Act for amending the Charitable Trusts Acts.	Section Sixteen from "and may direct" to "appropriated". Section Seventeen. The Schedule.
32 & 33 Vict. c. 111	Bishops Resignation Act 1869	An Act for the Relief of Archbishops and Bishops when incapacitated by infirmity.	Section Two, subsection (1), the proviso. Section Fifteen.
32 & 33 Vict. c. 112	Adulteration of Seeds Act 1869	An Act to prevent the Adulteration of Seeds.	Section Six from "and a warrant" to end of that section.
32 & 33 Vict. c. 114	Abandonment of Railways Act 1869	An Act to amend the Law relating to the Abandonment of Railways and the Dissolution of Railway Companies.	Section Ten.
32 & 33 Vict. c. 116	Titles to Land Consolidation (Scotland) Amendment Act 1869	An Act to amend "The Titles to Land Consolidation (Scotland) Act, 1868".	Section Two to "enacted that". Section Three to "enacted that". Section Five to "enacted that". Section Six to "enacted that". Section Seven to "enacted that". Section Eight to "enacted that". Section Nine to "enacted that".
32 & 33 Vict. c. 117	Pharmacy Act 1869	An Act to amend "The Pharmacy Act, 1868".	Sections Two and Four. Schedule (A.).
33 & 34 Vict. c. 3	Government of India Act 1870	An Act to make better provision for making Laws and Regulations for certain parts of India, and for certain other purposes relating thereto.	Section Four. Repealed as to all Her Majesty's Dominions.
33 & 34 Vict. c. 5	Consolidated Fund (£9,564,191 7s. 2d.) Act	An Act to apply certain Sums out of the Consolidated Fund to the service of the years ending on the Thirty-first day of March One thousand eight hundred and sixty-nine, One thousand eight hundred and seventy, and One thousand eight hundred and seventy-one, and preceding years.	The whole act.
33 & 34 Vict. c. 7	Mutiny Act 1870	An Act for punishing Mutiny and Desertion, and for the better payment of the Army and their Quarters.	The whole act.
33 & 34 Vict. c. 8	Marine Mutiny Act 1870	An Act for the regulation of Her Majesty's Royal Marine Forces while on Shore.	The whole act.
33 & 34 Vict. c. 9	Peace Preservation (Ireland) Act 1870	An Act to amend "The Peace Preservation (Ireland) Act, 1856," and for other purposes relating to the Preservation of Peace in Ireland.	The whole act.
33 & 34 Vict. c 13	Survey Act 1870	An Act to amend the Law relating to the Surveys of Great Britain, Ireland, and the Isle of Man.	Section Four. Section Five from "(except" to "perpetual.)". The Schedule.
33 & 34 Vict. c 14	Naturalization Act 1870	An Act to amend the Law relating to the legal condition of Aliens and British subjects.	Section Eighteen. The Schedule.
33 & 34 Vict. c 15	County Court (Buildings) Act 1870	An Act to transfer to the Commissioners of Her Majesty's Works and Public Buildings the property in and control over the Buildings and Property of the County Courts in England, and for other purposes relating thereto.	Section Five. The Schedule.
33 & 34 Vict. c 16	Inverness and Elgin County Boundaries Act 1870	An Act to define the Boundary between the Counties of Inverness and Elgin or Moray, in the District of Strathspey and Badenoch proper.	Sections Eleven, Twelve, Fifteen, and Sixteen.
33 & 34 Vict. c 19	Railways (Powers and Construction) Acts 1864, Amendment Act 1870	An Act to amend "The Railway Companies Powers Act, 1864," and "The Railway Construction Facilities Act, 1864".	Section Two. Section Four, the third paragraph. Section Five to "repealed, and".
33 & 34 Vict. c 20	Mortgage Debenture (Amendment) Act 1870	An Act to amend "The Mortgage Debenture Act, 1865".	Section Thirty-one.
33 & 34 Vict. c 23	Forfeiture Act 1870	An Act to abolish Forfeitures for Treason and Felony, and to otherwise amend the Law relating thereto.	Section Thirty-one.
33 & 34 Vict. c 24	Metropolitan Board of Works (Loans) Act 1870	An Act for making further Provision respecting the borrowing of Money by the Metropolitan Board of Works.	Section Two.
33 & 34 Vict. c 27	Protection of Inventions Act 1870	An Act for the Protection of Inventions exhibited at International Exhibitions in the United Kingdom.	Section Four from "the Workmen's" to "fifty-one; also".
33 & 34 Vict. c 29	Wine and Beerhouse Act Amendment Act 1870	An Act to amend and continue "The Wine and Beerhouse Act, 1869".	Section Four subsection (5.) to "repealed, and". Section Sixteen.
33 & 34 Vict. c 31	Consolidated Fund (£9,000,000) Act	An Act to apply the sum of Nine million pounds out of the Consolidated Fund to the service of the year ending the Thirty-first day of March, One thousand eight hundred and seventy-one.	The whole act.
33 & 34 Vict. c 32	Customs and Inland Revenue Act 1870	An Act to grant certain Duties of Customs and Inland Revenue.	Except Sections One, Four, and Five.
33 & 34 Vict. c 41	Exchequer Bonds Act 1870	An Act for raising the sum of One million three hundred thousand pounds by Exchequer Bonds for the service of the year ending on the Thirty-first day of March One thousand eight hundred and seventy-one.	The whole act.
33 & 34 Vict. c 44	Stamp Duty on Certain Leases Act 1870	An Act to declare the Stamp Duty chargeable on certain Leases.	The whole act.
33 & 34 Vict. c 45	Liverpool Admiralty District Registrar's Act 1870	An Act for establishing a District Registry of the High Court of Admiralty in England at Liverpool.	The whole act.
33 & 34 Vict. c 46	Landlord and Tenant (Ireland) Act 1870	An Act to amend the Law relating to the Occupation and Ownership of Land in Ireland.	Section Thirty-one. Section Thirty-seven from "until" to end of that section.
33 & 34 Vict. c 50	Shipping Dues Exemption Act 1870	An Act to amend "The Shipping Dues Exemption Act, 1867," to repeal an Act intituled "An Act requiring the proctors and others to give Notices for the holding of Vestries, making Proclamation concerning setting prices on Victuals, and giving Notice on Sundays," so far as such Act relates to the Isle of Man.	Repealed as to all Her Majesty's Dominions.
33 & 34 Vict. c 52	Extradition Act 1870	An Act for amending the Law relating to the Extradition of Criminals.	Section Twenty-seven, the last paragraph. Repealed as to all Her Majesty's Dominions.
33 & 34 Vict. c 53	Sanitary Act 1870	An Act to amend certain provisions in the Sanitary and Sewage Utilization Acts.	Section Three and the Schedule. Repealed except as to the parish of Woolwich.
33 & 34 Vict. c 59	East India Contracts Act 1870	An Act to render valid certain Testaments informally executed in India.	Section One. Repealed as to all Her Majesty's Dominions.
33 & 34 Vict. c 60	London Brokers Relief Act 1870	An Act to relieve the Brokers of the City of London from the supervision of the Court of Mayor and Aldermen of that City.	Sections Three and Four.
33 & 34 Vict. c 61	Life Assurance Companies Act 1870	An Act to amend the Law relating to Life Assurance Companies.	Section Eight from "on or before", "whether such" to "to the passing of this Act" and subsection (1.).
33 & 34 Vict. c 65	Larceny (Advertisements) Act 1870	An Act to amend the Law relating to Advertisements respecting Stolen Goods.	Section Four.
33 & 34 Vict. c 71	National Debt Act 1870	An Act for consolidating, with Amendments, certain Enactments relating to the National Debt.	Section Twenty, the last paragraph. The Second Schedule, Part II.
33 & 34 Vict. c 73	Annual Turnpike Acts Continuance Act 1870	An Act to continue certain Turnpike Acts in Great Britain, to repeal certain other Turnpike Acts, and to make further Provisions concerning Turnpike Roads.	Except Sections Ten to Fourteen.
33 & 34 Vict. c 77	Juries Act 1870	An Act to amend the Law relating to the Qualifications, Summoning, Attendance, and Remuneration of Special and Common Juries.	Section Seven to "enacted, that".
33 & 34 Vict. c. 79	Post Office Act 1870	An Act for further Regulation of Duties of Postage, and for other purposes relating to the Post Office.	Sections Four, Five, and Nine. Section Ten so far as it relates to 3 & 4 Vict. c. 96. s. 17. Sections Twelve, Thirteen, and Sixteen. Section Eighteen, the last paragraph. The First Schedule except so far as it describes the Acts firstly, secondly, and lastly therein mentioned.
33 & 34 Vict. c. 80	Census (Ireland) Act 1870	An Act for taking the Census of Ireland.	The whole act.
33 & 34 Vict. c. 83	Constabulary (Ireland) Amendment Act 1870	An Act to make better Provision for the Police Force in the City of Londonderry, and to amend the Acts relating to the Royal Irish Constabulary Force.	Section One from "and all persons" to "accordingly". Sections Seven, Eight, and Ten. Section Eleven to "repealed, and". Section Twelve.
33 & 34 Vict. c. 84	Public Schools Act 1870	An Act to amend the Public Schools Act, 1868.	The whole act.
33 & 34 Vict. c. 86	Sheriff Courts (Scotland) Act 1870	An Act the title of which begins with the words,—An Act to amend and extend the Act Sixteenth and Seventeenth Victoria, Chapter Ninety-two,—and ends with the words,—Sheriffs and Sheriffs Substitute in Scotland.	Section Eleven from "to be paid" to end of that section. Section Thirteen from "and so much" to "repealed but".
33 & 34 Vict. c. 90	Foreign Enlistment Act 1870	An Act to regulate the Conduct of Her Majesty's Subjects during the existence of Hostilities between Foreign States with which Her Majesty is at peace.	Section Thirty-one. Repealed as to all Her Majesty's Dominions.
33 & 34 Vict. c. 96	Appropriation Act 1870	An Act to apply a Sum out of the Consolidated Fund to the service of the year ending the Thirty-first day of March One thousand eight hundred and seventy-one, and to appropriate the supplies granted in this Session of Parliament.	Except Sections Six and Eight.
33 & 34 Vict. c. 97	Stamp Act 1870	An Act for granting certain Stamp Duties in lieu of Duties of the same kind now payable under various Acts, and consolidating and amending provisions relating thereto.	Sections Thirty-three to Thirty-five and Thirty-seven. The Schedule in part, namely:— The subjects of the headings beginning as follows (with the duties specified in connexion therewith):— ADMISSION to ecclesiastical benefices. ADMISSION and APPOINTMENT. APPOINTMENT whether by way of Donation. APPOINTMENTS to offices. COLLATION. COMMISSION or DEPUTATION. CURACY. DEPUTATION by the Commissioners. DONATION. ECCLESIASTICAL BENEFICE. INSTITUTION. PERPETUAL CURACY. PRESENTATION. the words "under the authority of any Act of Parliament" in Exemption (7) under heading beginning "BILL OF EXCHANGE of any other kind." and paragraph (1) under heading beginning LETTER OR POWER OF ATTORNEY.
33 & 34 Vict. c. 98	Stamp Duties Management Act 1870	An Act for consolidating and amending the Law relating to the Management of Stamp Duties.	Section Fourteen, sub-section (5.), paragraph (a).
33 & 34 Vict. c. 103	Expiring Laws Continuance Act 1870	An Act to continue various expiring Laws.	The whole act.
33 & 34 Vict. c. 105	Truck Commission Act 1870	An Act for appointing a Commission to inquire into the alleged prevalence of the Truck System, and the disregard of the Acts of Parliament prohibiting such System, and for giving such Commission the powers necessary for conducting such Inquiry.	The whole act.
33 & 34 Vict. c. 107	Census (England) Act 1870	An Act for taking the Census of England.	The whole act.
33 & 34 Vict. c. 108	Census (Scotland) Act 1870	An Act for taking the Census in Scotland.	The whole act.
33 & 34 Vict. c. 109	Common Law Procedure Amendment Act, Ireland, 1870	An Act to abolish certain Real Actions in the Superior Courts of Common Law in Ireland, and further to amend the Procedure in the said Courts; and for other purposes.	Section Four, the last paragraph.
33 & 34 Vict. c. 110	Matrimonial Causes and Marriage Law (Ireland) Amendment Act 1870	An Act to provide for the administration of the Law relating to Matrimonial Causes and Matters, and to amend the Law relating to Marriages, in Ireland.	Sections Five, Nineteen, Twenty, and Twenty-two. Section Thirty-nine to "void; but".
33 & 34 Vict. c. 111	Beerhouse Act 1870	An Act to make provision in relation to certain Beerhouses not duly qualified according to Law.	Section One so far as it relates to the fifteenth section of 3 & 4 Vict. c. 61. and the closing hour.
33 & 34 Vict. c. 112	Glebe Loan (Ireland) Act 1870	An Act the title of which begins with the words,—An Act to amend the Act of the first and second years of the Reign of His late Majesty King William the Fourth,—and ends with the words,—Lands for Glebes, in Ireland.	Section Three, from "out of" to "annexed mentioned." Section Six from "and all the provisions" to end of that section. Section Nine. The Schedule. Provided that the repeal of the Schedule shall not affect the reference thereto in 34 & 35 Vict. c. 100. s. 11.
34 & 35 Vict. c. 3	Parliamentary Costs Act 1871	An Act to empower Committees on Bills confirming or giving effect to Provisional Orders to award Costs, and examine Witnesses on Oath.	Section One.
34 & 35 Vict. c. 5	Income Tax Act 1871	An Act to make provision for the Assessment of Income Tax.	The whole act.
34 & 35 Vict. c. 6	Consolidated Fund (£462,580 9s. 11d.) Act 1871	An Act to apply the Sum of Four hundred and sixty-two thousand five hundred and eighty pounds nine shillings and eleven pence out of the Consolidated Fund to the Service of the Years ending the Thirty-first day of March One thousand eight hundred and seventy and One thousand eight hundred and seventy-one.	The whole act.
34 & 35 Vict. c. 7	Consolidated Fund (£5,411,900) Act 1871	An Act to apply the Sum of Five million four hundred and eleven thousand nine hundred pounds out of the Consolidated Fund to the Service of the Year ending the Thirty-first day of March One thousand eight hundred and seventy-two.	The whole act.
34 & 35 Vict. c. 9	Mutiny Act 1871	An Act for punishing Mutiny and Desertion, and for the better Payment of the Army and their Quarters.	The whole act.
34 & 35 Vict. c. 10	Marine Mutiny Act 1871	An Act for the Regulation of Her Majesty's Royal Marine Forces while on Shore.	The whole act.
34 & 35 Vict. c. 18	Justices Qualification Act 1871	An Act to amend the Law disqualifying Attorneys, Solicitors, and Proctors in practice from being Justices of the Peace for Counties.	Section One to "repealed; but".
34 & 35 Vict. c. 20	Consolidated Fund (£7,000,000) Act 1871	An Act to apply the Sum of Seven million pounds out of the Consolidated Fund to the Service of the Year ending the Thirty-first day of March One thousand eight hundred and seventy-two.	The whole act.
34 & 35 Vict. c. 21	Customs and Income Tax Act 1871	An Act to grant Duties of Customs and Income Tax.	The whole act.
34 & 35 Vict. c. 22	Lunacy Regulation (Ireland) Act 1871	An Act the title of which begins with the words,—An Act to amend the Law in Ireland relating to Commissions of Lunacy,—and ends with the words,—and for other purposes.	Section Five from "and every person who is by" to end of that section. Section Six from "and every person who is by" to "been fixed". Section Twenty. Section One hundred and fifteen, from "Provided always" to end of that section. Section One hundred and eighteen, the last paragraph. Schedule I.
34 & 35 Vict. c. 25	Protection of Life and Property in Certain Parts of Ireland Act 1871	An Act the title of which begins with the words,—An Act to empower the Lord Lieutenant,—and ends with the words,—to continue "The Peace Preservation (Ireland) Act, 1870."	The whole act.
34 & 35 Vict. c. 26	Universities Tests Act 1871	An Act to alter the Law respecting Religious Tests in the Universities of Oxford, Cambridge, and Durham, and in the Halls and Colleges of those Universities.	Section Eight to "mentioned; and". The Schedule.
34 & 35 Vict. c. 29	India Stock Dividends Act 1871	An Act to facilitate the payment of Dividends on India Stocks.	So far as the Act applies 33 & 34 Vict. c. 71. s. 20., the last paragraph.
34 & 35 Vict. c. 30	Post Office (Duties) Act 1871	An Act for the further Regulation of the Duties on Postage.	Section One. Section Two from "and the Acts" to end of that section. Section Four. Schedule Two.
34 & 35 Vict. c. 31	Trade Union Act 1871	An Act to amend the Law relating to Trades Unions.	Section Twenty-four.
34 & 35 Vict. c. 33	Burial Act 1871	An Act to explain and amend the Burial Acts.	Section One, the last paragraph.
34 & 35 Vict. c. 35	Metropolitan Police Court (Buildings) Act 1871	An Act to transfer to the Commissioners of Her Majesty's Works and Public Buildings the property in and control over the Buildings and Property of the Police Courts of the Metropolis, and for other purposes relating thereto.	Section Five. The Schedule.
34 & 35 Vict. c. 36	Pensions Commutation Act 1871	An Act to extend the Provisions of the Pension Commutation Acts, 1869 and 1870, to certain Public Civil Officers, and to consolidate and amend the said Acts.	Section Thirteen to "this Act, and". Section Fourteen.
34 & 35 Vict. c. 37	Prayer Book (Tables of Lessons) Act 1871	An Act to amend the Law relating to the Tables of Lessons and Psalter contained in the Prayer Book.	Section Two from "Provided that the Table" to "therefor; and".
34 & 35 Vict. c. 38	Public Health (Scotland) Amendment Act 1871	An Act for amending the Public Health (Scotland) Act, 1867.	Section One to "declared, that".
34 & 35 Vict. c. 46	Public Health (Scotland) Amendment Act 1871	An Act for amending the Law relating to the Appointment of the Gaoler, Chaplain, and Matron of the Prison of the City of Bath.	The whole act.
34 & 35 Vict. c. 47	Metropolitan Board of Works (Loans) Act 1871	An Act for amending the Acts regulating the borrowing of Money by the Metropolitan Board of Works; and for other purposes relating thereto.	Sections Ten, Fourteen, and Seventeen.
34 & 35 Vict. c. 48	Promissory Oaths Act 1871	An Act to repeal divers Enactments relating to Oaths and Declarations which are not in force; and for other purposes connected therewith.	Section One to end of subsection (1). The Schedules.
34 & 35 Vict. c. 49	Matrimonial Causes and Marriage Law (Ireland) Amendment Act 1871	An Act to amend the Matrimonial Causes and Marriage Law (Ireland) Amendment Act, 1870.	Sections Four and Seventeen.
34 & 35 Vict. c. 51	Consolidated Fund (£10,000,000) Act 1871	An Act to apply the Sum of Ten million pounds out of the Consolidated Fund to the Service of the Year ending the Thirty-first day of March One thousand eight hundred and seventy-two.	The whole act.
34 & 35 Vict. c. 52	Exchequer Bonds Act 1871	An Act for raising the Sum of Seven hundred thousand pounds by Exchequer Bonds for the Service of the year ending on the Thirty-first day of March One thousand eight hundred and seventy-two.	The whole act.
34 & 35 Vict. c. 58	Life Assurance Companies Act 1870	An Act to amend the Life Assurance Companies Act, 1870.	Section One.
34 & 35 Vict. c. 59	Public Libraries Act (Scotland, 1867) Amendment Act 1871	An Act to amend "The Public Libraries (Scotland) Act, 1867," and to give additional Facilities to the Local Authorities entrusted with carrying the same into execution.	Section One.
34 & 35 Vict. c. 60	Public Schools Act 1871	An Act to amend the Public Schools Act, 1868.	The Preamble. Section Two. Section Three, except the last proviso. Section Four.
34 & 35 Vict. c. 62	Indian Bishops Act 1871	An Act to enable Her Majesty to make Regulations relative to the leave of absence of Indian Bishops on Furlough and Medical Certificates.	From "and provided" to end of Act. Repealed as to all Her Majesty's Dominions.
34 & 35 Vict. c. 65	Juries Act (Ireland) 1871	An Act to amend and consolidate the Laws relating to Juries in Ireland.	Section Four, from "the several" to "repealed and", the word "other", (wherever it occurs), and from "except as to anything" to end of that section. Sections Five and Eleven. The First Schedule. The Third Schedule, Form A. to Form C. The Fourth and Fifth Schedules. Except as to Section Four and First Schedule, repealed so long as 39 & 40 Vict. c. 21. ss. 2, 4, 5, continue in force.
34 & 35 Vict. c. 68	Glasgow Boundaries Act 1871	An Act to determine the Boundaries of the Barony and Regality of Glasgow for purposes of Registration.	Sections Two to Four.
34 & 35 Vict. c. 69	Metropolitan Tramways Provisional Orders Suspension Act 1871	An Act to enable the Board of Trade to dispense with certain provisions of the Tramways Act, 1870, in respect of certain Provisional Orders.	The whole act.
34 & 35 Vict. c. 72	Judgments Registry (Ireland) Act 1871	An Act for the further protection of Purchasers against Crown Debts, and for amending the Laws relating to the Office of the Registrar of Judgments and other Offices of the Court of Chancery, Ireland.	Section One. Schedule A.
34 & 35 Vict. c. 73	Lancaster County Clerk Act 1871	An Act for making Regulations as to the Office of Clerk of the Peace for the County Palatine of Lancaster.	Section Four to "repealed, and". Section Seven.
34 & 35 Vict. c. 76	Summary Jurisdiction (Ireland) Amendment Act 1871	An Act to amend the Law relating to the Recovery of Small Debts and to Summary Jurisdiction in Ireland.	Preamble, the first two paragraphs. Section Three.
34 & 35 Vict. c. 78	Regulation of Railways Act 1871	An Act to amend the Law respecting the Inspection and Regulation of Railways.	Section Thirteen, the last paragraph. Section Fourteen, the last paragraph. Section Seventeen. Schedule Two, the third column.
34 & 35 Vict. c. 81	Reductions Ex Capite Lecti Abolished Act 1871	An Act to abolish Reductions ex capite lecti in Scotland.	The whole act.
34 & 35 Vict. c. 82	Church Building Acts Amendment Act 1871	Church Building Acts Amendment Act, 1871.	The whole act.
34 & 35 Vict. c. 83	Parliamentary Witnesses Oaths Act 1871	An Act for enabling the House of Commons and any Committee thereof to administer Oaths to Witnesses.	Section Two.
34 & 35 Vict. c. 84	Limited Owners Residences Act (1870) Amendment Act 1871	An Act to amend "The Limited Owners Residences Act, 1870".	Section Two.
34 & 35 Vict. c. 86	Regulation of the Forces Act 1871	An Act for the better Regulation of the Regular and Auxiliary Land Forces of the Crown; and for other purposes relating thereto.	Section Two.
34 & 35 Vict. c. 89	Appropriation Act 1871	An Act to apply a Sum out of the Consolidated Fund to the Service of the Year ending the Thirty-first day of March One thousand eight hundred and seventy-two, and to appropriate the Supplies granted in this Session of Parliament.	The whole act.
34 & 35 Vict. c. 91	Judicial Committee Act 1871	An Act to make further provision for the Despatch of Business by the Judicial Committee of the Privy Council.	Section One, the first two paragraphs. Section Two.
34 & 35 Vict. c. 94	Elementary Education (Elections) Act 1871	An Act to amend Paragraph Three of the Second Schedule of the Elementary Education Act, 1870.	The whole act.
34 & 35 Vict. c. 95	Expiring Laws Continuance Act 1871	An Act to continue various expiring Laws.	The whole act.
34 & 35 Vict. c. 96	Pedlars Act 1871	An Act for granting Certificates to Pedlars.	Section Twenty-five. Schedule Two, Form C.
34 & 35 Vict. c. 97	Military Manoeuvres Act 1871	An Act for making Provision for facilitating the Manoeuvres of Troops to be assembled during the ensuing Autumn.	The whole act.
34 & 35 Vict. c. 98	Vaccination Act 1871	An Act to amend the Vaccination Act, 1867.	Section Seventeen. The Schedule.
34 & 35 Vict. c. 99	Civil Bill Courts Procedure Amendment Act (Ireland) 1871	An Act to amend the Procedure in the Civil Bill Courts in Ireland.	Section Eight.
34 & 35 Vict. c. 100	Glebe Loan (Ireland) Amendment Act 1871	An Act to amend "The Glebe Loan (Ireland) Act, 1870".	Section Fourteen.
34 & 35 Vict. c. 101	Chain Cable and Anchor Act 1871	An Act to amend the Law respecting the proving and sale of Chain Cables and Anchors.	Sections Seven and Nine. The Third Schedule.
34 & 35 Vict. c. 102	Charitable Donations and Bequests Act (Ireland) 1871	An Act to amend the Laws of Charitable Donations and Bequests in Ireland.	Section Two from "Provided" to end of that section. Section Four to "repealed, and". Section Six to "repealed; and". Section Eight to "repealed; and".
34 & 35 Vict. c. 103	House Tax Act 1871	An Act to amend the Law relating to the Customs and Inland Revenue.	Except Sections Twenty-six and Thirty-one.
34 & 35 Vict. c. 105	Petroleum Act 1871	An Act for the safe keeping of Petroleum and other Substances of a like Nature.	Section Seventeen. The Schedules.
34 & 35 Vict. c. 109	Local Government (Ireland) Act 1871	An Act to amend the Law relating to the Local Government of Towns and populous Places in Ireland.	Section Twenty-six.
34 & 35 Vict. c. 110	Merchant Shipping Act 1871	An Act to amend the Merchant Shipping Acts.	Section Twelve.
34 & 35 Vict. c. 111	Beerhouses (Ireland) Act (1864) Amendment Act 1871	An Act to amend "The Beerhouses (Ireland) Act, 1864," and for other purposes relating thereto.	Section Four from "affect the" to "such repeal". Section Five.
34 & 35 Vict. c. 112	Prevention of Crimes Act 1871	An Act for the more effectual Prevention of Crime.	Section Twenty-one.
34 & 35 Vict. c. 113	Metropolis Water Act 1871	An Act to amend "The Metropolis Water Act, 1852," and to make further Provision for the due Supply of Water to the Metropolis and certain Places in the Neighbourhood thereof.	Section Five. Section Thirty-nine from "Notwithstanding" to end of that section. Section Fifty-one. Schedules B. and C.
34 & 35 Vict. c. 115	Annual Turnpike Acts Continuance Act 1871	An Act to continue certain Turnpike Acts in Great Britain, to repeal certain other Turnpike Acts, and to make further Provisions concerning Turnpike Roads.	Sections One to Fourteen. Section Fifteen, the last paragraph. Section Sixteen, the words and figures "or the Annual Turnpike Acts Continuance Act, 1868," and the last paragraph. The Schedules.
35 & 36 Vict. c. 1	Supply Act 1872	An Act to apply certain sums out of the Consolidated Fund to the Service of the Years ending the Thirty-first day of March One thousand eight hundred and seventy-one, One thousand eight hundred and seventy-two, and One thousand eight hundred and seventy-three.	The whole act.
35 & 36 Vict. c. 2	Poor Law Loans Act 1872	An Act to extend and explain the Law relating to Loans for purposes connected with the Relief of the Poor.	Section Three.
35 & 36 Vict. c. 3	Mutiny Act 1872	An Act for punishing Mutiny and Desertion, and for the better payment of the Army and their Quarters.	The whole act.
35 & 36 Vict. c. 4	Marine Mutiny Act 1872	An Act for the Regulation of Her Majesty's Royal Marine Forces while on shore.	The whole act.
35 & 36 Vict. c. 5	Bank of Ireland Charter Amendment Act 1872	An Act to amend the Charter under which the Governor and Company of the Bank of Ireland is incorporated.	Section Seven.
35 & 36 Vict. c. 9	West Indies (Encumbered Estates) Act 1872	An Act to continue the Appointment and Jurisdiction of the Commissioners for the Sale of Incumbered Estates in the West Indies.	Section Three. Repealed as to all Her Majesty's Dominions.
35 & 36 Vict. c. 11	Supply (No. 2) Act 1872	An Act to apply the sum of Six million pounds out of the Consolidated Fund to the Service of the Year ending the Thirty-first day of March One thousand eight hundred and seventy-three.	The whole act.
35 & 36 Vict. c. 14	Diocesan Boundaries Act 1872	An Act for the alteration of Boundaries of Dioceses.	Section One.
35 & 36 Vict. c. 20	Customs and Inland Revenue Act 1872	An Act to grant certain Duties of Customs and Inland Revenue and to alter other Duties.	Sections Two to Four. Section Six from "and no person" to end of that section. Sections Seven to Thirteen.
35 & 36 Vict. c. 22	Party Processions Act (Ireland) Repeal Act 1872	An Act to repeal an Act intituled "An Act to restrain Party Processions in Ireland."	The whole act.
35 & 36 Vict. c. 23	Isle of Man Harbours Act 1872	An Act for amending the Law relating to the Harbours and Coasts of the Isle of Man.	Sections Twenty-four and Thirty-three. The Second Schedule.
35 & 36 Vict. c. 25	Juries (Ireland) Act 1872	An Act to amend the Juries Act (Ireland), 1871.	Sections One, Four, and Six. The Schedule. Except as to Section One repealed so long as 39 & 40 Vict. c. 21. ss. 2, 3, 5, continue in force.
35 & 36 Vict. c. 30	Chain Cable and Anchor Act 1872	An Act to suspend the compulsory Operation of the Chain Cables and Anchors Act, 1871.	Section One to "repealed and" and the last two paragraphs.
35 & 36 Vict. c. 37	Supply (No. 3) Act 1872	An Act to apply the Sum of Eight million pounds out of the Consolidated Fund to the Service of the Year ending the Thirty-first day of March One thousand eight hundred and seventy-three.	The whole act.
35 & 36 Vict. c. 40	Bishops Resignation Act Continuance Act 1872	An Act for continuing the Bishops Resignation Act, 1869.	The whole act.
35 & 36 Vict. c. 43	Metropolitan Tramways Provisional Orders Suspension Act 1872	An Act to enable the Board of Trade to dispense with certain Provisions of the Tramways Act, 1870, in respect of certain Provisional Orders.	The whole act.
35 & 36 Vict. c. 44	Court of Chancery (Funds) Act 1872	An Act the title of which begins with the words,—An Act to abolish the Office of Accountant General of the High Court of Chancery,—and ends with the words,—Moneys and Effects of the Suitors thereof.	Section Four from "the office" to "abolished, and". Section Twenty-two. Section Twenty-six, the first paragraph, and subsection (1) of the proviso. Schedule Two.
35 & 36 Vict. c. 47	Galashiels and Selkirk Act 1872	An Act to amend the Act of the thirtieth and thirty-first years of Victoria, chapter eighty-five, intituled "An Act to include the whole of the Burgh of Galashiels within the County, Sheriffdom, and Commissariot of Selkirk".	Section Two.
35 & 36 Vict. c. 54	Public Schools Act 1872	An Act to amend the Public Schools Act, 1868.	The whole act.
35 & 36 Vict. c. 55	Basses Lights Act 1872	An Act for making better provision for the erection of Lighthouses on the Great Basses Rock, and on the Little Basses Rock in the Colony of Ceylon.	Section Eight.
35 & 36 Vict. c. 57	Debtors Act (Ireland) 1872	An Act for the Abolition of Imprisonment for Debt in Ireland, and for the Punishment of fraudulent Debtors, and for other purposes relating thereto.	Section Six, the last paragraph. Section Twenty-seven.
35 & 36 Vict. c. 58	Bankruptcy (Ireland) Amendment Act 1872	An Act for the Amendment of the Law of Bankruptcy in Ireland.	Section Five. Section Twenty-one, subsection (3), the second paragraph, and subsection (8). Schedule A.
35 & 36 Vict. c. 59	Elementary Education (Elections) Act 1872	An Act to amend Paragraph Three of the Second Schedule of the Elementary Education Act, 1870.	The whole act.
35 & 36 Vict. c. 60	Corrupt Practices (Municipal Elections) Act 1872	An Act for the better prevention of Corrupt Practices at Municipal Elections, and for establishing a Tribunal for the trial of the Validity of such Elections.	Section Twenty-nine. The Schedule.
35 & 36 Vict. c. 62	Education (Scotland) Act 1872	An Act to amend and extend the provisions of the Law of Scotland on the subject of Education.	Section Three from "to endure" in the first paragraph to end of subsection (5). Sections Four, Six, and Seven. Section Twelve, except the last paragraph. Section Twenty-seven from "and should any school board" to end of that section. Section Twenty-nine to "Board of Education, or". Section Thirty-seven from "And for the purpose" to end of that section. Section Forty-six from "provided always" to end of that section. Section Seventy-eight. Schedule B, Rule 4.
35 & 36 Vict. c. 64	Military Manoeuvres Act 1872	An Act for making provision for facilitating the Manœuvres of Troops to be assembled during the ensuing Autumn.	The whole act.
35 & 36 Vict. c. 65	Bastardy Laws Amendment Act 1872	An Act to amend the Bastardy Laws.	Section Two. The First Schedule.
35 & 36 Vict. c. 69	Local Government Board (Ireland) Act 1872	An Act the title of which begins with the words,—An Act for constituting a Local Government Board in Ireland,—and ends with the words,—Relief of the Poor in Ireland.	Section Twelve from "section" to "1871, and". The Schedule, except so far as it relates to 17 & 18 Vict. c. 103. and 34 & 35 Vict. c. 109.
35 & 36 Vict. c. 70	Law Officers Fees Act 1872	An Act to make better provision respecting certain Fees payable to the Law Officers of the Crown for England.	Section Two from "but this" to end of that section.
35 & 36 Vict. c. 73	Merchant Shipping Act 1872	An Act to amend the Merchant Shipping Acts and the Passenger Acts.	Section Three from "and the fourth" to "1871". Section Five to "repealed, and". Section Eight to "repealed, and". Section Ten from "the Trinity House of Deptford Strond shall" to "per annum; and that".
35 & 36 Vict. c. 76	Coal Mines Regulation Act 1872	An Act to consolidate and amend the Acts relating to the Regulation of Coal Mines and certain other Mines.	Section Nineteen, the words "The Weights and Measures Act, or" and the second paragraph (including the subsections). Sections Twenty-three, Twenty-four, and Seventy-six. Schedule Three.
35 & 36 Vict. c. 77	Metalliferous Mines Regulation Act 1872	An Act to consolidate and amend the Law relating to Metalliferous Mines.	Section Forty-five. The Schedule.
35 & 36 Vict. c. 79	Public Health Act 1872	An Act to amend the Law relating to Public Health.	Except Sections One, Two, Twenty, Fifty-one, Fifty-two, and Fifty-nine, and Section Sixty, so far as it relates to the interpretation of the terms "The metropolis" and "Local Government Acts" and the terms following the last-mentioned term. Repealed except as to the parish of Woolwich.
35 & 36 Vict. c. 80	Kensington Station and North and South London Junction Railway Act 1859 (Repayment of Moneys) Act 1872	An Act the title of which begins with the words,—An Act to enable the Commissioners of Her Majesty's Treasury,—and ends with the words,—"The Kensington Station and North and South London Junction Railway Act, 1859."	The whole act.
35 & 36 Vict. c. 83	Pensions Commutation Act 1872	An Act to extend the provisions of the Pensions Commutation Act, 1871, to Officers and Clerks of Telegraph Companies who are entitled to Annuities.	The whole act.
35 & 36 Vict. c. 85	Annual Turnpike Acts Continuance Act 1872	An Act to continue certain Turnpike Acts in Great Britain, to repeal certain other Turnpike Acts, and to make further provisions concerning Turnpike Roads.	Sections One to Eleven. The Schedules. Provided that the repeal shall take effect with respect to 13 & 14 Vict. c. lxvi. (mentioned in the Tenth Schedule) from the date mentioned for the continuation thereof.
35 & 36 Vict. c. 87	Appropriation Act 1872	An Act to apply a Sum out of the Consolidated Fund to the Service of the Year ending the Thirty-first day of March One thousand eight hundred and seventy-three, and to appropriate the Supplies granted in this Session of Parliament.	The whole act.
35 & 36 Vict. c. 88	Expiring Laws Continuance Act 1872	An Act to continue various expiring Laws.	The whole act.
35 & 36 Vict. c. 91	Borough Funds Act 1872	An Act to authorise the application of Funds of Municipal Corporations and other Governing Bodies in certain cases.	Section Nine. Section Thirteen.
35 & 36 Vict. c. 92	Parish Constables Act 1872	An Act to render unnecessary the general Appointment of Parish Constables.	Section Three from "and the twelfth" to "repealed,". Section Thirteen.
35 & 36 Vict. c. 93	Pawnbrokers Act 1872	An Act for consolidating, with Amendments, the Acts relating to Pawnbrokers in Great Britain.	Section Four from "but this repeal" to end of that section. Section Fifty-four.
35 & 36 Vict. c. 94	Licensing Act 1872	An Act for regulating the Sale of Intoxicating Liquors.	Section Twenty-eight from "and where other" to "nine of the clock;". Section Thirty-seven, the last paragraph. Section Thirty-eight from "Provided that" to end of subsection 2. Section Forty, the last paragraph to "had not passed". Section Sixty-nine from "Provided that" to end of that section. Section Seventy-four from "Police district means" to "him in that behalf;". Section Seventy-five to end of subsection (6). Section Seventy-seven as to the interpretation of the terms "License," "Licensing justices," "register of licenses," and "clerk to the licensing justices". Section Eighty. The Second Schedule.
36 & 37 Vict. c. 2	Polling Districts (Ireland) Act 1873	An Act to make special provisions in relation to the Constitution of certain Polling Districts at Parliamentary Elections in Ireland.	Section One. Section Two, subsections (1) to (5). Section Three to "be it enacted that". The Schedule.
36 & 37 Vict. c. 3	Supply Act 1873	An Act to apply certain Sums out of the Consolidated Fund to the Service of the Years ending the Thirty-first day of March One thousand eight hundred and seventy-two, One thousand eight hundred and seventy-three, and One thousand eight hundred and seventy-four.	The whole act.
36 & 37 Vict. c. 7	Endowed Schools (Time of Address) Act 1873	An Act to enlarge the Time within which an Address by either House of Parliament against certain Schemes made under the Endowed Schools Act, 1869, may be presented to Her Majesty.	The whole act.
36 & 37 Vict. c. 8	Income Tax Act 1873	An Act to make provision for the Assessment of Income Tax, and as to Assessors in the Metropolis.	The whole act.
36 & 37 Vict. c. 9	Bastardy Laws Amendment Act 1873	An Act to amend the Bastardy Laws.	Section Two. Section Three, the first subsection, and the word "And" next following. Section Eight.
36 & 37 Vict. c. 10	Mutiny Act 1873	An Act for punishing Mutiny and Desertion, and for the better payment of the Army and their Quarters.	The whole act.
36 & 37 Vict. c. 11	Marine Mutiny Act 1873	An Act for the Regulation of Her Majesty's Royal Marine Forces while on shore.	The whole act.
36 & 37 Vict. c. 12	Custody of Infants Act 1873	An Act to amend the Law as to the Custody of Infants.	Section Three.
36 & 37 Vict. c. 13	Salmon Fishery Commissioners Act 1873	An Act to discontinue the Office of Special Commissioners of Salmon Fisheries in England.	The whole act.
36 & 37 Vict. c. 14	Portpatrick Harbour Act 1873	An Act to repeal the Acts relating to the Harbour of Portpatrick in Scotland, and to vest the Lighthouse of Portpatrick in the Commissioners of Northern Lighthouses.	Except Section Four.
36 & 37 Vict. c. 17	East India Stock Dividend Redemption Act 1873	An Act the title of which begins with the words,—An Act to provide for the Redemption or Commutation of the Dividend on the Capital Stock of the East India Company,—and ends with the words,—Dissolution of the East India Company.	Sections Three to Nine. Section Ten to "shall think fit; and". Sections Eleven to Fifteen, Nineteen to Twenty-three, Twenty-six, Thirty-five, and Thirty-six. Provided that, without prejudice to the general savings in this Act, this repeal shall not affect any jurisdiction or procedure given or authorised by the enactments repealed with reference to questions arising in consequence of any commutation or payment, or affect any protection thereby conferred in reference to any act, matter, or thing done by any trustee, executor, administrator, or other person.
36 & 37 Vict. c. 18	Customs and Inland Revenue Act 1873	An Act to grant certain Duties of Customs and Inland Revenue, and to alter other Duties.	Except Sections One, Four, and Five.
36 & 37 Vict. c. 19	Poor Allotments Management Act 1873	An Act for making better provision for the management in certain cases of Lands allotted under Local Acts of Inclosure for the benefit of the Poor.	Section Ten.
36 & 37 Vict. c. 21	University of Dublin Tests Act 1873	An Act to abolish Tests in Trinity College and the University of Dublin.	The last section. The Schedule.
36 & 37 Vict. c. 23	Superannuation Act Amendment Act 1873	An Act the title of which begins with the words,—An Act to amend the law relating to the Grant of Superannuation,—and ends with the words,—One thousand eight hundred and seventy.	The whole act.
36 & 37 Vict. c. 24	Peace Preservation (Ireland) Acts Continuance Act 1873	An Act to continue the Peace Preservation (Ireland) Act, 1870, and the Protection of Life and Property in certain Parts of Ireland Act, 1871.	The whole act.
36 & 37 Vict. c. 26	Supply (No. 2) Act 1873	An Act to apply the Sum of Twelve million pounds out of the Consolidated Fund to the Service of the Year ending the Thirty-first day of March One thousand eight hundred and seventy-four.	The whole act.
36 & 37 Vict. c. 27	Juries (Ireland) Act 1873	An Act to amend the Law relating to Juries in Ireland.	The whole act.
36 & 37 Vict. c. 30	Registration of Voters (Ireland) Act 1873	An Act to amend the Law of Registration in Ireland so far as relates to the year One thousand eight hundred and seventy-three, and for other purposes relating thereto.	Except Sections One and Six.
36 & 37 Vict. c. 32	East India Loan Act 1873	An Act to enable the Secretary of State in Council of India to raise Money in the United Kingdom for the Service of the Government of India.	Section One, the last paragraph.
36 & 37 Vict. c. 37	Fairs Act 1873	An Act to amend the Law relating to Fairs in England and Wales.	Section Five.
36 & 37 Vict. c. 38	Vagrant Act Amendment Act 1873	An Act the title of which begins with the words,—An Act to amend an Act passed in the fifth year of the reign of His Majesty George the Fourth,—and ends with the words,—"The Vagrant Act Amendment Act, 1868".	Section Five.
36 & 37 Vict. c. 41	Public Schools (Shrewsbury and Harrow Schools Property) Act 1873	An Act to amend the Public Schools Act, 1868, as to the Property of Shrewsbury and Harrow Schools.	Section Two from "with reference to Shrewsbury" to "Shrewsbury, and." Sections Three, Four, and Six to Eight.
36 & 37 Vict. c. 42	Tithe Commutation Acts Amendment Act 1873	An Act for amending the Tithe Commutation Acts with respect to Market Gardens.	Section Two.
36 & 37 Vict. c. 45	Canada (Public Works) Loan Act 1873	An Act the title of which begins with the words,—An Act to authorise the Commissioners of Her Majesty's Treasury to guarantee,—and ends with the words,—Canada Defence Loan Act, 1870.	Section Nine.
36 & 37 Vict. c. 47	Blackwater Bridge Debt Act 1873	An Act the title of which begins with the words,—An Act to amend an Act passed in the session of Parliament held in the thirtieth and thirty-first years,—and ends with the words,—Cork and Waterford; and for other purposes relating thereto.	The whole act.
36 & 37 Vict. c. 48	Regulation of Railways Act 1873	An Act to make better provision for carrying into effect the Railway and Canal Traffic Act, 1854, and for other purposes connected therewith.	Section Thirty-three.
36 & 37 Vict. c. 51	Prison Officers Superannuation (Ireland) Act 1873	An Act to amend the Law relating to the Superannuation of Prison Officers in Ireland.	Section Three. The Schedule.
36 & 37 Vict. c. 53	Highland Schools Act 1873	An Act the title of which begins with the words,—An Act to make better provision respecting certain Sums payable to Schoolmasters of Highland Schools,—and ends with the words,—endowment of additional Schools in Scotland.	Section Three, the last two paragraphs. Sections Four and Five.
36 & 37 Vict. c. 54	Exchequer Bonds Act 1873	An Act to raise the Sum of One million six hundred thousand pounds sterling by Exchequer Bonds for the Service of the Year ending on the Thirty-first day of March One thousand eight hundred and seventy-four.	The whole act.
36 & 37 Vict. c. 58	Military Manoeuvres Act 1873	An Act for making provision for facilitating the Manœuvres of Troops to be assembled during the ensuing Autumn.	The whole act.
36 & 37 Vict. c. 59	Slave Trade (East African Courts) Act 1873	An Act the title of which begins with the words,—An Act for regulating and extending the Jurisdiction in matters connected with the Slave Trade,—and ends with the words,—under future Treaties.	Section Eight. The Schedule.
36 & 37 Vict. c. 62	Public Schools (Eton College Property) Act 1873	An Act to amend Section Twenty-four of the Public Schools Act, 1868, with respect to the Property of Eton College.	The Preamble. Section One except the last two paragraphs of that section.
36 & 37 Vict. c. 63	Law Agents (Scotland) Act 1873	An Act to amend the Law relating to Law Agents practising in Scotland.	Sections Three, Four, Ten, Twenty-four, and Twenty-five. Provided that, without prejudice to the general savings in this Act, this repeal shall not affect the obligation under Section Three or Section Four on the Registrar to enrol as a Law Agent any person and to grant to him a certificate of enrolment.
36 & 37 Vict. c. 66	Supreme Court of Judicature Act 1873	An Act the title of which begins with the words,—An Act for the constitution of a Supreme Court,—and ends with the words,—Judicial Committee of Her Majesty's Privy Council.	Section Five, the second paragraph, the words "the Lord Chief Justice of the Common Pleas, and the Lord Chief Baron" and from "shall be styled" to "of Justice, and". Section Thirteen from "the Lord Chief Justice of the Common Pleas" to "Exchequer". Section Fourteen from "the Lord Chief Justice of the Common Pleas" to "Exchequer". Section Thirty-one, the paragraph beginning "Any deficiency". Section Thirty-seven, the words "Common Pleas, or Exchequer". Section Thirty-eight. Section Forty from "A Divisional Court" to "three such Judges". Section Forty-two to "Admiralty respectively; and". Section Forty-three. Section Forty-four to "a Divisional Court". Section Forty-seven from "or five" to "be part". Section Seventy-eight from "and the existing Prothonotaries" to end of that section. Section Seventy-nine from "the Lord Chief Justice of the Common Pleas" to "Exchequer". Section Eighty. Section Ninety-six from "The same order" to end of that section. Section One hundred, the paragraph beginning "London Court of Bankruptcy".
36 & 37 Vict. c. 70	Revising Barristers Act 1873	An Act to amend the Law relating to the appointment of Revising Barristers and the holding of Revision Courts.	Section Two. The Schedule.
36 & 37 Vict. c. 71	Salmon Fishery Act 1873	An Act to amend the Law relating to Salmon Fisheries in England and Wales.	Section Four from "The definition" to "repealed, and". Section Fifty-five from "that sections" to "repealed, and". Section Sixty-five.
36 & 37 Vict. c. 73	Cambridge Commissioners Act 1873	An Act to amend so much of section four of the Public Health Act, 1872, as relates to the Cambridge Commissioners.	The whole act.
36 & 37 Vict. c. 74	Royal Irish Constabulary Act 1873	An Act to amend the Laws relating to the Pay of the Royal Irish Constabulary.	The whole act.
36 & 37 Vict. c. 75	Expiring Laws Continuance Act 1873	An Act to continue various expiring Laws.	The whole act.
36 & 37 Vict. c. 79	Appropriation Act 1873	An Act to apply a Sum out of the Consolidated Fund to the Service of the Year ending the Thirty-first day of March One thousand eight hundred and seventy-four, and to appropriate the Supplies granted in this Session of Parliament.	The whole act.
36 & 37 Vict. c. 81	Langbaurgh Coroners Act 1873	An Act to authorise the division of the Wapentake of Langbaurgh in the county of York into Districts for the purpose of Coroners jurisdiction, and the appointment of additional Coroners for the said Wapentake.	Section Six.
36 & 37 Vict. c. 85	Merchant Shipping Act 1873	An Act to amend the Merchant Shipping Acts.	Section Thirty-three.
36 & 37 Vict. c. 86	Elementary Education Act 1873	An Act to amend the Elementary Education Act (1870), and for other purposes connected therewith.	Section Four. Section Six from "but the said" to end of that section. Section Ten, the last paragraph. Section Sixteen, the last paragraph. Section Eighteen, the last paragraph. Section Twenty-one from "but such substitution" to end of that section. Section Twenty-four, subsections (1.) and (2.) Section Twenty-eight. The Fourth Schedule.
36 & 37 Vict. c. 87	Endowed Schools Act 1873	An Act to continue and amend the Endowed Schools Act, 1869.	Section Nine. Section Fourteen, the last paragraph. Sections Nineteen and Twenty. The Schedule.
36 & 37 Vict. c. 88	Slave Trade Act 1873	An Act for consolidating with Amendments the Acts for carrying into effect Treaties for the more effectual Suppression of the Slave Trade, and for other purposes connected with the Slave Trade.	Section Thirty. The Second Schedule.
36 & 37 Vict. c. 89	Gas and Water Works Facilities Act 1870 Amendment Act 1873	An Act to extend and amend the provisions of the Gas and Water Works Facilities Act, 1870.	Sections Two to Eleven. The Schedule.
36 & 37 Vict. c. 90	Annual Turnpike Acts Continuance Act 1873	An Act to continue certain Turnpike Acts in Great Britain, to repeal certain other Turnpike Acts, and for other purposes connected therewith.	Sections One to Twelve. The Schedules.
37 & 38 Vict. c. 1	Consolidated Fund (£1,422,797 14s. 6d.) Act	An Act the title of which begins with the words,—An Act to apply the Sum of,—and ends with the words,—One thousand eight hundred and seventy-four.	The whole act.
37 & 38 Vict. c. 2	Consolidated Fund (£7,000,000) Act	An Act to apply the sum of Seven million pounds out of the Consolidated Fund to the Service of the Year ending the Thirty-first day of March One thousand eight hundred and seventy-five.	The whole act.
37 & 38 Vict. c. 3	East India Loan Act 1874	An Act to enable the Secretary of State in Council of India to raise Money in the United Kingdom for the Service of the Government of India.	Section Fourteen. Section Fifteen from "and the provisions" to end of that section. Section Eighteen.
37 & 38 Vict. c. 4	Mutiny Act 1874	An Act for punishing Mutiny and Desertion, and for the better payment of the Army and their Quarters.	The whole act.
37 & 38 Vict. c. 5	Marine Mutiny Act 1874	An Act for the Regulation of Her Majesty's Royal Marine Forces while on shore.	The whole act.
37 & 38 Vict. c. 7	Middlesex Sessions Act 1874	An Act to amend the Law respecting the payment of the Assistant Judge of the Court of the Sessions of the Peace for the county of Middlesex, and his Deputy, and the Chairman of the Second Court at such Sessions.	Section Five. The Second Schedule.
37 & 38 Vict. c. 9	Public Works Loan (School Loans) Act 1874	An Act the title of which begins with the words,—An Act to authorise an Advance out of the Consolidated Fund,—and ends with the words,—Elementary Education Act, 1873.	The whole act.
37 & 38 Vict. c. 10	Consolidated Fund (£13,000,000) Act	An Act to apply the Sum of Thirteen million pounds out of the Consolidated Fund to the Service of the Year ending the Thirty-first day of March One thousand eight hundred and seventy-five.	The whole act.
37 & 38 Vict. c. 13	Bishop of Calcutta Act 1874	An Act to extend to the present Bishop of Calcutta the Regulations made by Her Majesty as to the Leave of Absence of Indian Bishops.	Repealed as to all Her Majesty's Dominions.
37 & 38 Vict. c. 15	Betting Act 1874	An Act to amend the Act of sixteenth and seventeenth Victoria, chapter one hundred and nineteen, intituled "An Act for the Suppression of Betting Houses".	Section Four to "repealed, and".
37 & 38 Vict. c. 16	Customs and Inland Revenue Act 1874	An Act to grant certain Duties of Customs and Inland Revenue, to repeal and alter other Duties, and to amend the Laws relating to Customs and Inland Revenue.	The whole act.
37 & 38 Vict. c. 21	Four Courts Marshalsea Discontinuance Act 1874	An Act for the discontinuance of the Four Courts Marshalsea (Dublin), and the removal of Prisoners therefrom.	Section Five, the proviso. Section Six. Section Seven, the words "removed or". Section Eight to end of Act.
37 & 38 Vict. c. 22	Revenue Officers' Disabilities Removal Act 1874	An Act to relieve Revenue Officers from remaining Electoral Disabilities.	The whole act.
37 & 38 Vict. c. 23	Resident Magistrates and Police Commissioners Salaries Act 1874	An Act to amend the Acts regulating the Salaries of Resident Magistrates in Ireland and the Salaries of the Chief Commissioner and Assistant Commissioner of Police of the Police District of Dublin Metropolis.	Section One. Section Six, the second paragraph. Section Seven to "enacted, that" and from "Provided always" to end of that section. Schedule B.
37 & 38 Vict. c. 24	Harbour of Colombo Loan Act 1874	An Act to empower the Public Works Loan Commissioners to advance a Sum of Money, by way of Loan, for the improvement of the Harbour of Colombo in the Colony of Ceylon.	Section Six.
37 & 38 Vict. c. 25	Herring Fishery Barrels Act 1874	An Act to remove the Restrictions contained in the British White Herring Fishery Acts in regard to the use of Fir Wood for Herring Barrels.	Section One to "is hereby repealed; and".
37 & 38 Vict. c. 28	Juries (Ireland) Act 1874	An Act to further amend the Law relating to Juries in Ireland.	The whole act.
37 & 38 Vict. c. 34	Apothecaries Act Amendment Act 1874	An Act to amend the Act of the fifty-fifth year of King George the Third, chapter one hundred and ninety-four, intituled "An Act for better regulating the Practice of Apothecaries in England and Wales".	Section Two.
37 & 38 Vict. c. 40	Board of Trade Arbitrations, &c. Act 1874	An Act the title of which begins with the words,—An Act to amend the powers of the Board of Trade,—and ends with the words,—reference of Differences to the Railway Commissioners in lieu of Arbitrators.	Section Five.
37 & 38 Vict. c. 42	Building Societies Act 1874	An Act to consolidate and amend the Laws relating to Building Societies.	Section Twenty-seven, the word "now". Section Forty-four from "The registrar" to end of that section. The Schedule from "FORMS OF CERTIFICATE" to end.
37 & 38 Vict. c. 45	County of Hertford and Liberty of St. Alban Act 1874	An Act the title of which begins with the words,—An Act for altering the Boundaries between the Liberty of St. Alban,—and ends with the words,—Justice at Quarter Sessions in that County.	Section Ten, the last paragraph. Section Fourteen, the words "of the county prison at Hertford, and" (where they first occur), the word "other" (where it next occurs) and from "A governor" to "and other". Section Fifteen, the words "of the county prison at St. Albans and" (where they first occur), the word "other" (where it next occurs) and from "A governor" to "and other". Section Eighteen, the sixth paragraph. Section Twenty-one, the last paragraph. Sections Twenty-seven, Thirty to Thirty-five, and Forty-three.
37 & 38 Vict. c. 46	Customs (Isle of Man) Tariff Act 1874	An Act to consolidate and amend the Duties of Customs in the Isle of Man.	Section Six. Schedule A.
37 & 38 Vict. c. 49	Licensing Act 1874	An Act to amend the Laws relating to the Sale and Consumption of Intoxicating Liquors.	Section Two, the words "and as to the provision repealing section twenty-four of the principal Act,". Section Four from "and so much" to end of that section. Section Twelve to "enacted, that". Section Twenty-seven to "enactment, and". Section Thirty-three.
37 & 38 Vict. c. 51	Chain Cables and Anchors Act 1874	An Act to amend the Law respecting the Proving and Sale of Chain Cables and Anchors.	Section Six to "in lieu thereof". Section Eight. The Schedule.
37 & 38 Vict. c. 53	Revising Barristers Act 1874	An Act to amend the Law relating to the Payment of Revising Barristers.	Section Five. The Schedule.
37 & 38 Vict. c. 54	Rating Act 1874	An Act to amend the Law respecting the Liability and Valuation of certain Property for the purpose of Rates.	Section Fourteen.
37 & 38 Vict. c. 56	Appropriation Act 1874	An Act to apply a Sum out of the Consolidated Fund to the Service of the Year ending the thirty-first day of March One thousand eight hundred and seventy-five, and to appropriate the Supplies granted in this Session of Parliament.	The whole act.
37 & 38 Vict. c. 57	Real Property Limitation Act 1874	An Act for the further Limitation of Actions and Suits relating to Real Property.	Section Nine from "(which several" to "repealed)".
37 & 38 Vict. c. 58	Police (Expenses) Act 1874	An Act to make further provision respecting the contribution out of Moneys provided by Parliament towards the Expenses of the Police Force in the Metropolitan Police District, and elsewhere in Great Britain.	The whole act.
37 & 38 Vict. c. 60	Shannon Act 1874	An Act to amend and enlarge the Powers of the Acts relating to the Navigation of the River Shannon; and for other purposes relating thereto.	The whole act.
37 & 38 Vict. c. 61	Royal (late Indian) Ordnance Corps Act 1874	An Act for granting Compensation to Officers of the Royal (late Indian) Ordnance Corps.	Sections Three to Five.
37 & 38 Vict. c. 64	Evidence Further Amendment (Scotland) Act 1874	An Act to further alter and amend the Law of Evidence in Scotland, and to provide for the recording, by means of Short-hand Writing, of Evidence in Civil Causes in Sheriff Courts in Scotland.	Section One.
37 & 38 Vict. c. 67	Slaughter-houses, &c. (Metropolis) Act 1874	An Act to regulate and otherwise deal with Slaughter-houses and certain other Businesses in the Metropolis.	Sections Eleven and Fourteen.
37 & 38 Vict. c. 69	Licensing Act (Ireland) 1874	An Act to amend the Laws relating to the Sale and Consumption of Intoxicating Liquors in Ireland.	Section Three. Section Twenty to "enacted, that". Section Thirty-seven, the last paragraph. Section Thirty-eight.
37 & 38 Vict. c. 70	Valuation (Ireland) Amendment Act 1874	An Act to amend the Law relating to the Valuation of Rateable Property in Ireland.	Section Four.
37 & 38 Vict. c. 72	Fines Act (Ireland) 1851 Amendment Act 1874	An Act to explain and amend the Fines Act (Ireland), 1851, and for other purposes relating thereto.	Section Three.
37 & 38 Vict. c. 73	Post Office Savings Banks Act 1874	An Act to amend the Law relating to the Payment to and Repayment by the Commissioners for the Reduction of the National Debt of Moneys received in and to the accounts relating to the Post Office Savings Bank.	Section Three from "Section twelve" to end of that section.
37 & 38 Vict. c. 74	Private Lunatic Asylums (Ireland) Act 1874	An Act to amend the Law respecting certain Receipts and Expenses connected with Private Lunatic Asylums in Ireland.	Section Three. The Schedule.
37 & 38 Vict. c. 76	Expiring Laws Continuance Act 1874	An Act to continue various expiring Laws.	The whole act.
37 & 38 Vict. c. 77	Colonial Clergy Act 1874	An Act respecting Colonial and certain other Clergy.	Sections Two and Ten. The Schedules. Repealed as to all Her Majesty's Dominions.
37 & 38 Vict. c. 80	Constabulary (Ireland) Act 1874	An Act to amend the Laws relating to the Royal Irish Constabulary.	Section Two from paragraph numbered 4. to end of that section. Section Thirteen. The Schedule.
37 & 38 Vict. c. 81	Great Seal (Offices) Act 1874	An Act to provide for the abolition of certain Offices connected with the Great Seal, and to make better provision respecting the Office of the Clerk of the Crown in Chancery.	Section Four, the first paragraph. Section Six, the first paragraph. Section Nine, the words "and the Public Offices Fees Act, 1866, shall apply to all such fees". Section Twelve. The Schedule.
37 & 38 Vict. c. 82	Church Patronage (Scotland) Act 1874	An Act to alter and amend the laws relating to the Appointment of Ministers to Parishes in Scotland.	Section Three from "the said Acts" to "repealed, and". Sections Four to Six. Section Seven, the second paragraph. Section Eight from "nor shall anything" to end of that section. Section Nine from "the word guardian shall include" to "public capacity;" and from "heritors shall mean" to end of that section.
37 & 38 Vict. c. 83	Supreme Court of Judicature (Commencement) Act 1874	An Act for delaying the coming into operation of the Supreme Court of Judicature Act, 1873.	Section One.
37 & 38 Vict. c. 86	Irish Reproductive Loan Fund Act 1874	An Act to amend the Law relating to the Irish Reproductive Loan Fund.	Sections Six and Eight.
37 & 38 Vict. c. 87	Endowed Schools Act 1874	An Act to amend the Endowed Schools Acts.	Section One, the last paragraph. Section Three to "inspectors; and". Sections Seven and Eight. The Schedule.
37 & 38 Vict. c. 88	Births and Deaths Registration Act 1874	An Act to amend the Law relating to the Registration of Births and Deaths in England, and to consolidate the Law respecting the Registration of Births and Deaths at Sea.	Section Fifty-four. The Fifth Schedule.
37 & 38 Vict. c. 89	Sanitary Law Amendment Act 1874	An Act to amend and extend the Sanitary Laws.	Sections One to Eighteen and Twenty-one to Forty-five. Section Forty-six to "Sanitary Acts; and". Section Forty-eight. Section Forty-nine so far as it relates to slaughter-houses. Section Fifty-seven, the last two paragraphs. Repealed except as to the parish of Woolwich.
37 & 38 Vict. c. 92	Alderney Harbour (Transfer) Act 1874	An Act to provide for the Transfer to the Admiralty and the Secretary of State for the War Department of Alderney Harbour and certain Lands near it.	Section Four.
37 & 38 Vict. c. 94	Conveyancing (Scotland) Act 1874	An Act to amend the Law relating to Land Rights and Conveyancing, and to facilitate the Transfer of Land in Scotland.	Section Thirty-three. Section Thirty-four from "and shall not be pleadable" to "and seventy nine:" (where those words next occur). Section Fifty-five. Section Fifty-seven to "His Majesty's service; and". Section Sixty-one to "is hereby repealed; and". Section Sixty-two to "and in place thereof". Section Sixty-three to "and in place thereof". Section Sixty-four to "and in place thereof". Section Sixty-five to "and in place thereof".
37 & 38 Vict. c. 95	Annual Turnpike Acts Continuance Act 1874	An Act to continue certain Turnpike Acts in Great Britain, and to repeal certain other Turnpike Acts; and for other purposes connected therewith.	Sections One to Nine. The Schedules. Provided that the repeal shall take effect with respect to 4 W. 4. c. xxxi., 15 & 16 Vict. c. cliv., 7 G. 4. c. xvi., 3 W. 4. c. lvii., and 14 Vict. c. xii. (mentioned in the Fifth and Sixth Schedules) from the dates mentioned for the continuation thereof.
38 & 39 Vict. c. 1	Supply Act 1875	An Act the title of which begins with the words,—An Act to apply the Sum,—and ends with the words,—One thousand eight hundred and seventy-five.	The whole act.
38 & 39 Vict. c. 2	Supply (No. 2) Act 1875	An Act to apply the Sum of Seven million pounds out of the Consolidated Fund to the Service of the Year ending the Thirty-first day of March One thousand eight hundred and seventy-six.	The whole act.
38 & 39 Vict. c. 3	Metropolitan Police Magistrates Act 1875	An Act to make further provision with respect to the Salaries of the Magistrates of the Police Courts in the Metropolitan Police District.	Section Two. The Schedule.
38 & 39 Vict. c. 5	Registry of Deeds (Ireland) Act 1875	An Act to amend the Law relating to the Registry of Deeds Office, Ireland.	Section One to "Provided that".
38 & 39 Vict. c. 7	Mutiny Act 1875	An Act for punishing Mutiny and Desertion, and for the better payment of the Army and their Quarters.	The whole act.
38 & 39 Vict. c. 8	Marine Mutiny Act 1875	An Act for the Regulation of Her Majesty's Royal Marine Forces while on shore.	The whole act.
38 & 39 Vict. c. 9	Building Societies Act 1875	An Act to repeal Section Eight of the Building Societies Act, 1874, and make other provision in lieu thereof.	Section One.
38 & 39 Vict. c. 10	Supply (No. 3) Act 1875	An Act to apply the Sum of Fifteen millions out of the Consolidated Fund to the Service of the Year ending the Thirty-first day of March One thousand eight hundred and seventy-six.	The whole act.
38 & 39 Vict. c. 13	Holidays Extension Act 1875	An Act to extend to the Docks, Custom Houses, Inland Revenue Offices, and Bonding Warehouses in England and Ireland certain provisions of The Bank Holidays Act, 1871, and to amend the same.	Section Three from "and section six" to "repealed".
38 & 39 Vict. c. 14	Peace Preservation (Ireland) Act 1875	An Act to amend and continue certain Acts for the Preservation of the Peace in Ireland, and to grant an Indemnity in certain cases.	The whole act.
38 & 39 Vict. c. 15	Sea Fisheries Act 1875	An Act to amend the Sea Fisheries Act, 1868.	Section One from "and all powers" to "cease".
38 & 39 Vict. c. 17	Explosives Act 1875	An Act to amend the Law with respect to manufacturing, keeping, selling, carrying, and importing Gunpowder, Nitro-glycerine, and other explosive Substances.	Section One hundred and twenty-two from "and the Act" to end of that section. The Fifth Schedule.
38 & 39 Vict. c. 19	Bishops Resignation Act 1875	An Act for making perpetual the Bishops Resignation Act, 1869.	The whole act.
38 & 39 Vict. c. 21	Public Entertainments Act 1875	An Act for amending the Law relating to Houses of Public Dancing, Music, or other Public Entertainment of the like kind, in the Cities of London and Westminster.	Section Two from "and all proceedings" to end of that section.
38 & 39 Vict. c. 23	Customs and Inland Revenue Act 1875	An Act to grant certain Duties of Customs and Inland Revenue, to alter other Duties, and to amend the Laws relating to Customs and Inland Revenue.	Sections Two to Seven. Section Eleven, the first paragraph. Section Twelve from "taken out after" to "after the said last-mentioned day" and from "and every such licence" to "duty of excise". Section Fourteen. The Schedule.
38 & 39 Vict. c. 25	Public Stores Act 1875	An Act to consolidate, with amendments, the Acts relating to the Protection of Public Stores.	Section Eighteen to "save that". The Second Schedule.
38 & 39 Vict. c. 26	Bankruptcy (Scotland) Act 1875	An Act to amend the Law of Bankruptcy in Scotland.	Section Two.
38 & 39 Vict. c. 28	Metropolitan Police Staff (Superannuation) Act 1875	An Act to amend the Law respecting the Superannuation Allowances of certain Officers of the Staff of the Metropolitan Police.	Section Four.
38 & 39 Vict. c. 30	Glebe Loan (Ireland) Amendment Act 1875	An Act to amend the Glebe Loan (Ireland) Amendment Act, 1871.	The whole act.
38 & 39 Vict. c. 31	Railway Companies Act 1875	An Act to make perpetual Section Four of the Railway Companies Act, 1867, and Section Four of the Railway Companies (Scotland) Act, 1867.	The whole act.
38 & 39 Vict. c. 34	Bishopric of Saint Albans Act 1875	An Act the title of which begins with the words,—An Act to amend the Acts relating to the Ecclesiastical Commissioners,—and ends with the words,—new Bishopric of Saint Albans.	Section Seven from "and whenever" to end of that section.
38 & 39 Vict. c. 35	South Wales Turnpike Trusts Amendment Act 1875	An Act for the further Amendment of the Laws relating to Turnpike Roads in South Wales.	Section Three to "effect; namely".
38 & 39 Vict. c. 37	Juries (Ireland) Act 1875	An Act to amend the Law relating to Juries in Ireland.	The whole act.
38 & 39 Vict. c. 39	Metalliferous Mines Regulation Act 1875	An Act to amend the provisions of the Metalliferous Mines Regulation Act, 1872, with respect to the annual Returns from Mines.	Section Four.
38 & 39 Vict. c. 40	Municipal Elections Act 1875	An Act to amend the Law regulating Municipal Elections.	Section Twelve. The Second Schedule.
38 & 39 Vict. c. 44	Constabulary (Ireland) Act 1875	An Act to amend the Constabulary (Ireland) Act, 1874.	The whole act.
38 & 39 Vict. c. 45	Sinking Fund Act 1875	An Act to amend the Law with respect to the Reduction of the National Debt and the Charge for the National Debt in the Consolidated Fund.	Section Six.
38 & 39 Vict. c. 50	County Courts Act 1875	An Act to amend the Acts relating to the County Courts.	Section Twelve. Schedule (C.)
38 & 39 Vict. c. 51	Pacific Islanders Protection Act 1875	An Act the title of which begins with the words,—An Act to amend the Act of,—and ends with the words,—Criminal Outrages upon Natives of the Islands in the Pacific Ocean.	Section Eleven.
38 & 39 Vict. c. 55	Public Health Act 1875	An Act for consolidating and amending the Acts relating to Public Health in England.	Section Two hundred and fifty-two, the last two paragraphs. Sections Three hundred and eighteen, Three hundred and twenty-four, Three hundred and twenty-five, and Three hundred and thirty-eight. Schedule II. Rules 73 and 74. Schedule V. Part II.
38 & 39 Vict. c. 57	Pharmacy Act (Ireland) 1875	An Act to institute a Pharmaceutical Society, and to regulate the Qualifications of Pharmaceutical Chemists and of Chemists and Druggists, in Ireland.	Section Five from "and the said persons" to "Ireland" and from "and the said Sir Dominic" to end of that section. Section Eight from "on the first Monday of October in the year" to "remainder of the members of such council shall go out of office; and". Sections Nine and Fourteen.
38 & 39 Vict. c. 58	Public Works Loans (Money) Act 1875	An Act to authorise Advances to the Public Works Loan Commissioners for enabling them to make Loans under divers Acts authorising such Loans.	Sections Two and Three.
38 & 39 Vict. c. 60	Friendly Societies Act 1875	An Act to consolidate and amend the Law relating to Friendly and other Societies.	Sections Five and Seven. Section Thirty, subsection (8.), the last paragraph. Schedule I.
38 & 39 Vict. c. 61	Entail Amendment (Scotland) Act 1875	An Act to further amend the Law of Entail in Scotland.	Section Five, subsection (8.) to "repealed; but".
38 & 39 Vict. c. 63	Sale of Food and Drugs Act 1875	An Act to repeal the Adulteration of Food Acts, and to make better provision for the Sale of Food and Drugs in a pure state.	Section One.
38 & 39 Vict. c. 64	Government Officers (Security) Act 1875	An Act to repeal the Guarantee by Companies Act, 1867, and to make other provision in lieu thereof.	Section One.
38 & 39 Vict. c. 65	Metropolitan Board of Works (Loans) Act 1875	An Act for further amending the Acts relating to the raising of Money by the Metropolitan Board of Works, and for other purposes.	Section Two. Section Three, the first two paragraphs. Section Four, the first three and last paragraphs. Section Five, the first three paragraphs. Section Six, the first three and last paragraphs. Section Seven.
38 & 39 Vict. c. 67	Lunatic Asylums (Ireland) Act 1875	An Act to amend the Laws relating to Private and District Lunatic Asylums in Ireland.	Section Fifteen.
38 & 39 Vict. c. 72	Expiring Laws Continuance Act 1875	An Act to continue various expiring Laws.	The whole act.
38 & 39 Vict. c. 73	India Home (Appointments) Act 1875	An Act to amend the Law relating to the Appointment of certain Persons who entered the Employment of the Home Government of India before the thirty-first day of December one thousand eight hundred and seventy-four.	The whole act.
38 & 39 Vict. c. 74	Public Health (Scotland) Act 1867 Amendment Act 1875	An Act to amend "The Public Health (Scotland) Act, 1867," and other Sanitary Acts, in respect of Loans for Sanitary Purposes.	Section Three, the first paragraph.
38 & 39 Vict. c. 76	Ecclesiastical Fees Act 1875	An Act to make provision for Returns relating to Ecclesiastical Fees, and for other purposes.	Section Six.
38 & 39 Vict. c. 77	Supreme Court of Judicature Act 1875	An Act to amend and extend the Supreme Court of Judicature Act, 1873.	Section Three, the first paragraph and the words "and style" in the second paragraph. Section Four, the second paragraph from "the Lord Chief Justice of the Common Pleas" to end of that paragraph, the fourth paragraph, the fifth paragraph, the words, "the Common Pleas Division, the Exchequer Division," and the seventh paragraph to "take effect;. Section Eight to the end of the first paragraph of the enactment, the next paragraph from "He shall be entitled" to end of that paragraph and the next paragraph from "Provided that" to end of that paragraph. Section Fourteen, from "and the Lord Chief Justice of England" in the last paragraph to end of that section. Section Sixteen. Section Seventeen, subsection (1.) the words "and the Court of Appeal" and "respectively". Section Eighteen, the first paragraph from "except" to "before the commencement of this Act,". Section Nineteen, the words "the First Schedule hereto and". Section Twenty, the words "or in the First Schedule hereto,". Section Twenty-six, the third paragraph (to end of the subsections) except subsection (3.) to "the fees.. Section Twenty-nine, except the last paragraph. Section Thirty-one. Section Thirty-three, subsection (1.) and the word "other" in subsection (2.) Section Thirty-four. The Schedules. Provided that the repeal shall take effect with respect to Sections Sixteen, Eighteen, Nineteen, and Twenty, and the First Schedule from the 24th day of October 1883.
38 & 39 Vict. c. 78	Appropriation Act 1875	An Act to apply a Sum out of the Consolidated Fund to the Service of the Year ending the Thirty-first day of March One thousand eight hundred and seventy-six, and to appropriate the Supplies granted in this Session of Parliament.	The whole act.
38 & 39 Vict. c. 79	Legal Practitioners Act 1875	An Act to amend the Law relating to Legal Practitioners.	Section Two, the first paragraph. The Schedule.
38 & 39 Vict. c. 83	Local Loans Act 1875	An Act to amend the Law relating to Securities for Loans contracted by Local Authorities.	Section Thirty-five.
38 & 39 Vict. c. 86	Conspiracy and Protection of Property Act 1875	An Act for amending the Law relating to Conspiracy, and to the Protection of Property, and for other purposes.	Section Seventeen, except from "Any order for wages" to "not otherwise;"
38 & 39 Vict. c. 87	Land Transfer Act 1875	An Act to simplify Titles and facilitate the Transfer of Land in England.	Sections One hundred and thirteen and One hundred and twenty-nine.
38 & 39 Vict. c. 89	Public Works Loans Act 1875	An Act to consolidate with Amendments the Acts relating to Loans for Public Works.	Sections Forty-two, Fifty-two, and Fifty-four. Section Fifty-seven, paragraph (2.).
38 & 39 Vict. c. 94	Offences against the Person Act 1875	An Act to amend the Law relating to Offences against the Person.	Section Two.
38 & 39 Vict. c. 96	National School Teachers (Ireland) Act 1875	An Act to provide for additional Payments to Teachers of National Schools in Ireland.	Section Seven from "shall before the first" to "March one thousand eight hundred and seventy-six, and".
39 & 40 Vict. c. 2	Consolidated Fund Act (4,080,000l.)	An Act to apply the Sum of Four million and eighty thousand pounds out of the Consolidated Fund to the Service of the Year ending on the Thirty-first day of March One thousand eight hundred and seventy-six.	The whole act.
39 & 40 Vict. c. 4	Consolidated Fund Act (10,029,550l. 5s. 1d.)	An Act to apply certain Sums out of the Consolidated Fund to the Service of the Years ending the Thirty-first day of March One thousand eight hundred and seventy-five, One thousand eight hundred and seventy-six, and One thousand eight hundred and seventy-seven.	The whole act.
39 & 40 Vict. c. 8	Mutiny Act 1876	An Act for punishing Mutiny and Desertion, and for the better payment of the Army and their Quarters.	The whole act.
39 & 40 Vict. c. 9	Marine Mutiny Act 1876	An Act for the Regulation of Her Majesty's Royal Marine Forces while on shore.	The whole act.
39 & 40 Vict. c. 15	Consolidated Fund Act (11,000,000l.)	An Act to apply the Sum of Eleven million pounds out of the Consolidated Fund to the Service of the Year ending the thirty-first day of March One thousand eight hundred and seventy-seven.	The whole act.
39 & 40 Vict. c. 16	Customs and Inland Revenue Act 1876	An Act to grant and alter certain Duties of Customs and Inland Revenue, and to amend the Laws relating to Customs and Inland Revenue.	Section Two. Section Four, the first two paragraphs. Sections Six, Seven, Nine, and Ten. The Schedule to the second "Section 6."
39 & 40 Vict. c. 18	Treasury Solicitor Act 1876	An Act to incorporate the Solicitor for the Affairs of Her Majesty's Treasury, and make further provision respecting the Grant of the Administration of the Estates of deceased Persons for the use of Her Majesty.	Section Eight. Section Nine, the proviso, sub-section (4.).
39 & 40 Vict. c. 20	Statute Law Revision (Substituted Enactments) Act 1876	An Act to facilitate the Revision of the Statute Law by substituting in certain Acts, incorporating Enactments which have been otherwise repealed, a reference to recent Enactments still in force.	Section One, the first paragraph. Section Two, the first paragraph. Section Three to "enacted as follows; that". Section Four, the first paragraph. Section Five, the first paragraph. Section Six.
39 & 40 Vict. c. 22	Trade Union Act Amendment Act 1876	An Act to amend the Trade Union Act, 1871.	Section Sixteen, the first paragraph.
39 & 40 Vict. c. 28	Court of Admiralty (Ireland) Amendment Act 1876	An Act to amend the Court of Admiralty (Ireland) Act, 1867, and confer a more extended Admiralty Jurisdiction on the Recorders of Cork and Belfast.	Section Seven from "and such fees" to end of that section.
39 & 40 Vict. c. 31	Public Works Loans (Money) Act 1876	An Act to grant Money for the purpose of Loans by the Public Works Loan Commissioners, and to amend the Public Works Loans Act, 1875.	Sections Three and Eight.
39 & 40 Vict. c. 33	Trade Marks Registration Amendment Act 1876	An Act for the Amendment of the Trade Marks Registration Act, 1875.	Section One, the first paragraph.
39 & 40 Vict. c. 34	Elver Fishing Act 1876	An Act to amend the Law relating to Elver Fishing.	Section One.
39 & 40 Vict. c. 35	Customs Tariff Act 1876	An Act for consolidating the Duties of Customs.	Section One from "and in the Act" to "so included and repealed in the said table;" The Schedule from "or any other vegetable" to "chicory or coffee", the words and figures "Paste or chocolate - - the lb. 0 0 2", from "Malt" to "See Spirits" (where those words next occur), from "Tea, until the first day of August 1877" to "0 3 6" and from "Varnish. See Spirits" to "0 0 1."
39 & 40 Vict. c. 36	Customs Consolidation Act 1876	An Act to consolidate the Customs Laws.	Section Twenty-seven, from "and the specifications" to end of that section. Section Forty-two, the fourth paragraph of the Table from "malt (except" to "made from malt)". Section Two hundred and eighty-seven.
39 & 40 Vict. c. 37	Nullum Tempus (Ireland) Act 1876	An Act to assimilate the Law in Ireland to the Law in England as to quieting Possessions and Titles against the Crown.	Section Four.
39 & 40 Vict. c. 38	Pauper Children (Ireland) Act 1876	An Act to extend the Limits of Age up to which, with the Assent of Boards of Guardians, Orphan and deserted pauper Children may be supported out of Workhouses in Ireland.	Section One.
39 & 40 Vict. c 39	Annual Turnpike Acts Continuance Act 1876	An Act to continue certain Turnpike Acts in Great Britain, and to repeal certain other Turnpike Acts; and for other purposes connected therewith.	Sections One to Seven. The Schedules. Provided that the repeal shall take effect with respect to 6 G. 4. c. i., 7 G. 4. c. xix., 9 G. 4. cc. lxxi. and lxxiv., 10 G. 4. c. xxv., and 3 W. 4. c. xl. (mentioned in the Fourth Schedule) from the dates mentioned for the continuation thereof.
39 & 40 Vict. c 40	Medical Practitioners Act 1876	An Act for enabling legally qualified Medical Practitioners to hold certain public Medical Appointments, and for amending the Medical Act.	The first two paragraphs of the Preamble. Section Two.
39 & 40 Vict. c 42	Convict Prisons Returns Act 1876	An Act to amend the Law respecting certain Returns from Convict Prisons.	Section Three.
39 & 40 Vict. c 44	Legal Practitioners (Ireland) Act 1876	An Act to amend the Law relating to Legal Practitioners in Ireland.	Section Two. The Schedule.
39 & 40 Vict. c 45	Industrial and Provident Societies Act 1876	An Act to consolidate and amend the Laws relating to Industrial and Provident Societies.	Section Four. Schedule I.
39 & 40 Vict. c 50	Poor Law Rating (Ireland) Act 1876	An Act to amend the Law for the Relief of the Poor in Ireland in respect to rating and chargeability on Poor Law Unions.	Section Three from "The first section of" to end of that section.
39 & 40 Vict. c 52	Savings Bank (Barrister) Act 1876	An Act to amend the Law respecting the Powers and Duties vested in the Barrister appointed to certify the Rules of Savings Banks.	Section Three, the third paragraph, from "but until" to end of that paragraph, and the last paragraph.
39 & 40 Vict. c 53	Superannuation Act 1876	An Act to make further provision respecting the Superannuation Allowance to be granted to Civil Servants serving in unhealthy Climates.	Section Six.
39 & 40 Vict. c 54	Bishopric of Truro Act 1876	An Act to provide for the Foundation of a new Bishopric out of a part of the Diocese of Exeter.	Section Five from "and whenever" to end of that section.
39 & 40 Vict. c 55	Metropolitan Board of Works (Loans) Act 1876	An Act for further amending the Acts relating to the raising of Money by the Metropolitan Board of Works; and for other purposes relating thereto.	Section Three. Section Four, the first two paragraphs. Sections Five and Six. Section Seven, the first three paragraphs. Section Eight, the first three paragraphs. Section Nine, the first three and last paragraphs. Section Ten.
39 & 40 Vict. c 56	Commons Act 1876	An Act for facilitating the regulation and improvement of Commons, and for amending the Acts relating to the Inclosure of Commons.	Section Thirty-four to "1845, and".
39 & 40 Vict. c 59	Appellate Jurisdiction Act 1876	An Act for amending the Law in respect of the Appellate Jurisdiction of the House of Lords; and for other purposes.	Section Thirteen. Section Fifteen, the first paragraph from "Be it enacted" to end of that paragraph, the fourth and seventh paragraphs, and the ninth paragraph to "mentioned; and". Section Sixteen, from "and so much of section" to end of that section. Section Seventeen, the second paragraph, the words "any three or more of" and from "of whom" to "specified therein", and the last paragraph. Sections Twenty-one and Twenty-four. Provided that the repeal shall take effect with respect to Section Sixteen from the 24th day of October 1883.
39 & 40 Vict. c 60	Appropriation Act 1876	An Act to apply a Sum out of the Consolidated Fund to the Service of the Year ending the Thirty-first day of March One thousand eight hundred and seventy-seven, and to appropriate the Supplies granted in this Session of Parliament.	The whole act.
39 & 40 Vict. c 61	Divided Parishes and Poor Law Amendment Act 1876	An Act to provide for the better arrangement of divided Parishes and other local areas, and to make sundry Amendments in the Law relating to the Relief of the Poor in England.	Section Twelve to "repealed, and". Section Twenty-seven. Section Twenty-nine, the last paragraph.
39 & 40 Vict. c 63	Notices to Quit (Ireland) Act 1876	An Act to render necessary in Ireland a Year's Notice to Quit to determine a Tenancy from Year to Year, and otherwise to amend the Law as to Notices to Quit.	Section Six to "before the passing of this Act". Section Seven.
39 & 40 Vict. c 64	Police (Expenses) Continuance Act 1876	An Act to continue for One Year the Police (Expenses) Act, 1875.	The whole act.
39 & 40 Vict. c 65	Tramways (Ireland) Amendment (Dublin) Act 1876	An Act to amend the Tramways (Ireland) Act, 1860, and the Tramways (Ireland) Amendment Act, 1861, as regards the application of the same to the County and the County of the City of Dublin.	Section Two to "subsequent year". Section Five.
39 & 40 Vict. c 68	Superannuation Post Office and War Office Act 1876	An Act the title of which begins with the words,—An Act to amend the Law for the Payment of Remuneration,—and ends with the words,—War Department and Her Majesty's Postmaster General.	The whole act.
39 & 40 Vict. c 69	Expiring Laws Continuance Act 1876	An Act to continue various expiring Laws.	The whole act.
39 & 40 Vict. c 70	Sheriff Courts (Scotland) Act 1876	An Act to alter and amend the Law relating to the Administration of Justice in Civil Causes in the ordinary Sheriff Courts in Scotland, and for other purposes relating thereto.	Section Twelve, subsection (6). Section Thirty-five to "abolished, and". Section Forty-one from "and sections twelve and thirteen" to end of that section. Section Forty-four the words "which Schedule C. is hereby repealed". Section Forty-eight. Section Fifty-three from "instead of" to "that purpose,".
39 & 40 Vict. c 72	Norwich and Boston Corrupt Voters Act 1876	An Act to suspend for a limited period the holding of an Election of a Member or Members to serve in Parliament for the City of Norwich, and to disfranchise certain Voters for the said City, and also certain Voters for the Borough of Boston.	Repealed from the 15th day of August 1883.
39 & 40 Vict. c 73	Pensions Commutation Act 1876	An Act to amend the Pensions Commutation Act, 1871.	Section Three.
39 & 40 Vict. c 74	Agricultural Holdings (England) Act (1875) Amendment Act 1876	An Act for amending so much of the Agricultural Holdings (England) Act, 1875, as relates to the Governors of the Bounty of Queen Anne for the Augmentation of the Maintenance of the Poor Clergy.	Section Two. The Schedule.
39 & 40 Vict. c 75	Rivers Pollution Prevention Act 1876	An Act for making further Provision for the Prevention of the Pollution of Rivers.	Section Thirteen to "passing of this Act;".
39 & 40 Vict. c 76	Municipal Privilege Act, Ireland, 1876	An Act to extend the privileges of Municipal Corporations in Ireland.	Section Three to "the Act, and" and the word "following". Section Four the words "this and" and "succeeding". Section Six.
39 & 40 Vict. c 78	Juries Procedure (Ireland) Act 1876	An Act to amend the Procedure connected with Trial by Jury in Ireland.	Section Six to "enacted, that". Section Sixteen to "enacted, that". Section Twenty to "and thereupon". Section Twenty-two. The Second Schedule.
39 & 40 Vict. c 79	Elementary Education Act 1876	An Act to make further provision for Elementary Education.	Section Ten, the last paragraph. Section Nineteen, the first paragraph. Section Forty-four, the words "which is repealed by this Act". The Fourth Schedule.
39 & 40 Vict. c 80	Merchant Shipping Act 1876	An Act to amend the Merchant Shipping Acts.	Section Thirty from "by the" to "authority". Section Forty-five. The Schedule.
40 & 41 Vict. c 1	Consolidated Fund Act (350,000l.)	An Act to apply the Sum of Three hundred and fifty thousand pounds out of the Consolidated Fund to the Service of the Year ending the Thirty-first day of March One thousand eight hundred and seventy-seven.	The whole act.
40 & 41 Vict. c 2	Treasury Bills Act 1877	An Act to provide for the preparation, issue, and payment of Treasury Bills, and make further provision respecting Exchequer Bills.	Section Six, the last paragraph.
40 & 41 Vict. c 3	Publicans' Certificates (Scotland) Act (1876) Amendment Act 1877	An Act to amend the Publicans' Certificates (Scotland) Act, 1876.	Section Two to "enacted, that", from "at the meeting" to "thereof, and", and from "in every subsequent" to "shall be made". Section Three.
40 & 41 Vict. c 5	Exchequer Bills and Bonds Act 1877	An Act to raise the Sum of Seven hundred thousand pounds by Exchequer Bills or Exchequer Bonds for the Service of the Year ending on the Thirty-first day of March One thousand eight hundred and seventy-seven.	The whole act.
40 & 41 Vict. c 6	Supply Act 1877	An Act to apply certain Sums out of the Consolidated Fund to the Service of the Years ending on the Thirty-first day of March One thousand eight hundred and seventy-six, One thousand eight hundred and seventy-seven, and One thousand eight hundred and seventy-eight.	The whole act.
40 & 41 Vict. c 7	Mutiny Act 1877	An Act for punishing Mutiny and Desertion, and for the better payment of the Army and their Quarters.	The whole act.
40 & 41 Vict. c 8	Marine Mutiny Act 1877	An Act for the Regulation of Her Majesty's Royal Marine Forces while on shore.	The whole act.
40 & 41 Vict. c 9	Supreme Court of Judicature Act 1877	An Act for amending the Supreme Court of Judicature Acts, 1873 and 1875.	Section Five, from "the Master" to "Baron". Section Six.
40 & 41 Vict. c 11	Jurisdiction in Rating Act 1877	An Act to make provision with respect to Judicial Proceedings in certain Cases relating to Rating.	Section Two.
40 & 41 Vict. c 12	Consolidated Fund (5,900,000l.) Act	An Act to apply the Sum of Five million nine hundred thousand pounds out of the Consolidated Fund to the Service of the Year ending the Thirty-first day of March One thousand eight hundred and seventy-eight.	The whole act.
40 & 41 Vict. c 13	Customs, Inland Revenue, and Savings Banks Act 1877	An Act to grant certain Duties of Customs and Inland Revenue, and to amend the laws relating to Customs, Inland Revenue, and Savings Banks.	Sections Two, Six to Nine, and Thirteen. Section Seventeen, the last paragraph. Schedule B.
40 & 41 Vict. c 18	Settled Estates Act 1877	An Act to consolidate and amend the Law relating to Leases and Sales of Settled Estates.	Section Fifty-eight. The Schedule.
40 & 41 Vict. c 19	Public Works Loans Act 1877	An Act the title of which begins with the words,—An Act to grant Money for the purpose of Loans,—and ends with the words,—Public Works Loans Act, 1875.	The whole act.
40 & 41 Vict. c 20	Constabulary (Ireland) Amendment Act 1877	An Act to fix the Salaries of the Members of the Royal Irish Constabulary, and to amend the Eleventh Section of the Constabulary (Ireland) Amendment Act, 1870.	Section One.
40 & 41 Vict. c 21	Prison Act 1877	An Act to amend the Law relating to Prisons in England.	Section Thirteen, the first paragraph. Section Fifteen, the first paragraph. Sections Sixteen to Twenty-one. Section Forty-five, the last paragraph. Section Forty-seven, the last paragraph. Section Fifty-four. Section Sixty, from "subject to this proviso" to end of that section.
40 & 41 Vict. c 24	Consolidated Fund (20,000,000l.) Act	An Act to apply the Sum of Twenty million pounds out of the Consolidated Fund to the Service of the Year ending the Thirty-first day of March One thousand eight hundred and seventy-eight.	The whole act.
40 & 41 Vict. c 25	Solicitors Act 1877	An Act for regulating the Examination of Persons applying to be admitted Solicitors of the Supreme Court of Judicature in England, and for otherwise amending the Law relating to Solicitors.	Section Twenty-two. Section Twenty-three, from "Provided also" to end of that section.
40 & 41 Vict. c 27	Public Works Loans (Ireland) Act 1877	An Act the title of which begins with the words,—An Act to grant Money for the purposes of Loans,—and ends with the words,—Commissioners of Public Works in Ireland.	Preamble, the fourth and fifth paragraphs. Sections Nine and Ten. Part III. The Second Schedule.
40 & 41 Vict. c 32	Public Loans Remission Act 1877	An Act to remit certain Loans formerly made out of the Consolidated Fund or other Public Revenue of the United Kingdom.	Except so far as it relates to Beattock Inn.
40 & 41 Vict. c 37	Trade Marks Registration Extension Act 1877	An Act for extending the Time for the Registration of Trade Marks, in so far as relates to Trade Marks used in Textile Industries.	The whole act. (Note: This act was repealed by the Patents, Designs, and Trade Marks Act 1883 (46 & 47 Vict. c. 57) which was also granted royal assent on 25 August 1883.)
40 & 41 Vict. c 38	Board of Education (Scotland) Act 1877	An Act to continue for One Year the Board of Education in Scotland.	The whole act.
40 & 41 Vict. c 42	Fisheries (Oyster, Crab, and Lobster) Act 1877	An Act to amend the Law relating to the Fisheries of Oysters, Crabs, and Lobsters, and other Sea Fisheries.	Section Sixteen.
40 & 41 Vict. c 43	Justices Clerks Act 1877	An Act to amend the Law with respect to the Appointment, Payment, and Fees of Clerks of Justices of the Peace and Clerks of Special and Petty Sessions.	Section Eight, the second paragraph. Section Ten from "and so much" to end of that section.
40 & 41 Vict. c 48	Universities of Oxford and Cambridge Act 1877	An Act to make further Provision respecting the Universities of Oxford and Cambridge and the Colleges therein.	Section Two, so far as it relates to the interpretation of the terms "Emolument" "School" and "Professorship" and the terms following the last-mentioned term. Sections Three to Twenty-three, Twenty-five to Forty-three, Forty-five to Fifty-one, Fifty-six, and Fifty-nine.
40 & 41 Vict. c 49	General Prisons (Ireland) Act 1877	An Act to amend the Law relating to Prisons in Ireland.	Section Seven. Section Eight from "and in case" to end of that section. Section Ten, the last paragraph. Section Seventeen, the second paragraph from "all boards" to "thereupon". Section Twenty, the last two paragraphs. Section Twenty-six to "effect, viz.,". Section Fifty-seven, paragraph (a.)
40 & 41 Vict. c 50	Sheriff Courts (Scotland) Act 1877	An Act the title of which begins with the words,—An Act to amend the Law in regard to the appointment of Sheriffs Substitute and Procurators Fiscal in Scotland,—and ends with the words,—purposes connected therewith.	Section Four to "enacted as follows :". Section Six from "(save in" to "expressly provided)", and from "The appointment of any" to end of that section. Section Twelve.
40 & 41 Vict. c 51	East India Loan Act 1877	An Act to enable the Secretary of State in Council of India to raise Money in the United Kingdom for the Service of the Government of India.	Section Nineteen.
40 & 41 Vict. c 52	Metropolitan Board of Works (Money) Act 1877	An Act for further amending the Acts relating to the raising of Money by the Metropolitan Board of Works; and for other purposes relating thereto.	Sections Three to Seven. Section Eight, the first two paragraphs. Sections Nine and Ten. Section Eleven, the first three paragraphs. Section Twelve, the first three paragraphs. Section Thirteen, the first three and last paragraphs. Sections Fourteen to Twenty-two. The Schedule.
40 & 41 Vict. c 53	Prisons (Scotland) Act 1877	An Act to amend the Law relating to Prisons in Scotland.	Sections Seventeen to Twenty-three and Twenty-six. Section Fifty-four, the last paragraph. Section Sixty-one, the first two paragraphs. Section Seventy-one, the paragraph defining "Prison" from "subject to this proviso" to end of that paragraph. Section Seventy-two. The Schedule.
40 & 41 Vict. c 56	County Officers and Courts (Ireland) Act 1877	An Act to amend the Laws relating to County Officers and to Courts of Quarter Sessions and Civil Bill Courts in Ireland.	Section Six. Section Thirty-three, paragraph (e.). Section Forty, paragraph (b.). Section Fifty-nine from "The defendant may appeal" to "1851". Section Seventy-five to "hereby repealed, and". Section Seventy-nine from "The power of making" to end of that section. Section Eighty-three, the second paragraph to end of subsection (6.) except sub-section (3.) to "the fees" and the words "applied and accounted for" in the next paragraph. Section Eighty-six, the last paragraph, except so far as it relates to the recorder of the town of Belfast. Section Eighty-eight, the last paragraph. Schedule A.
40 & 41 Vict. c 57	Supreme Court of Judicature Act (Ireland) 1877	An Act for the constitution of a Supreme Court of Judicature, and for other purposes relating to the better Administration of Justice, in Ireland.	Section Eighteen, the sixth paragraph from "This last provision" to end of that paragraph. Section Twenty-three, sub-section three. Section Forty-three, the proviso. Section Forty-nine. Section Seventy-two, the third paragraph. Section Seventy-three, the second paragraph from "may with" to "seventy-nine, and". Section Eighty-four, the second paragraph (to end of the subsections) except sub-section (3.) to "the fees". Section Eighty-five, the first three paragraphs.
40 & 41 Vict. c 58	Police (Expenses) Continuance Act 1877	An Act to continue for One Year the Police (Expenses) Act, 1875.	The whole act.
40 & 41 Vict. c 61	Appropriation Act 1877	An Act to apply a Sum out of the Consolidated Fund to the Service of the Year ending the Thirty-first day of March One thousand eight hundred and seventy-eight, and to appropriate the Supplies granted in this Session of Parliament.	The whole act.
40 & 41 Vict. c 63	Building Societies Act 1877	An Act to amend the Building Societies Act, 1874.	Section Three.
40 & 41 Vict. c 64	Annual Turnpike Acts Continuance Act 1877	An Act to continue certain Turnpike Acts in Great Britain, and to repeal certain other Turnpike Acts; and for other purposes connected therewith.	Sections One to Eight. The Schedules.
40 & 41 Vict. c 66	Local Taxation Returns Act 1877	An Act to amend the Law with respect to the Annual Returns of Local Taxation in England, and for other purposes relating to such Taxation.	Section Four to "eight, and".
40 & 41 Vict. c 67	Expiring Laws Continuance Act 1877	An Act to continue various expiring Laws.	The whole act.
41 & 42 Vict. c 1	Consolidated Fund Act (6,000,000l.)	An Act to apply the Sum of Six million pounds out of the Consolidated Fund to the Service of the Year ending the Thirty-first day of March One thousand eight hundred and seventy-eight.	The whole act.
41 & 42 Vict. c 2	Exchequer Bills and Bonds Act 1878	An Act to raise the Sum of Six million pounds by Exchequer Bonds, Exchequer Bills, or Treasury Bills.	The whole act.
41 & 42 Vict. c 6	Glebe Loan (Ireland) Amendment Act 1878	An Act to amend the Glebe Loan (Ireland) Amendment Act, 1875.	The whole act.
41 & 42 Vict. c 7	Exchequer Bonds Act 1878	An Act to raise the Sum of One million pounds by Exchequer Bonds, for the Service of the Year ending on the Thirty-first day of March One thousand eight hundred and seventy-eight.	The whole act.
41 & 42 Vict. c 9	Consolidated Fund (No. 2) Act 1878	An Act to apply certain Sums out of the Consolidated Fund to the Service of the Years ending on the Thirty-first day of March One thousand eight hundred and seventy-seven, One thousand eight hundred and seventy-eight, and One thousand eight hundred and seventy-nine.	The whole act.
41 & 42 Vict. c 10	Mutiny Act 1878	An Act for punishing Mutiny and Desertion, and for the better payment of the Army and their Quarters.	The whole act.
41 & 42 Vict. c 15	Customs and Inland Revenue Act 1878	An Act to grant certain Duties of Customs and Inland Revenue, to alter other Duties, and to amend the Laws relating to Customs and Inland Revenue.	Section Two. Section Three to "under the Customs Tariff Act, 1876," the words and figures "Segars - - the lb. 0 5 4" and the last paragraph. Section Six from "and section one" to end of that section. Sections Seven to Eleven. Section Thirteen, sub-section (3.). Section Seventeen from "Provided" to end of that section. Section Eighteen.
41 & 42 Vict. c 16	Factory and Workshop Act 1878	An Act to consolidate and amend the Law relating to Factories and Workshops.	Section Two from "Provided that" to end of that section. Section One hundred and three. Section One hundred and seven, the proviso.
41 & 42 Vict. c 18	Public Works Loans Act 1878	An Act the title of which begins with the words,—An Act to grant Money for purpose of Loans,—and ends with the words,—Public Works Loans Act, 1875.	Sections Two, Five, and Seven.
41 & 42 Vict. c 21	Consolidated Fund (No. 3) Act 1878	An Act to apply the Sum of Seven million five hundred thousand pounds out of the Consolidated Fund to the Service of the Year ending on the Thirty-first day of March One thousand eight hundred and seventy-nine.	The whole act.
41 & 42 Vict. c 22	Exchequer Bonds (No. 2) Act 1878	An Act to raise the Sum of One million five hundred thousand pounds by Exchequer Bonds, for the Service of the Year ending on the Thirty-first day of March One thousand eight hundred and seventy-nine.	The whole act.
41 & 42 Vict. c 26	Parliamentary and Municipal Registration Act 1878	An Act the title of which begins with the words,—An Act to amend the Law relating to the Registration of Voters,—and ends with the words,—appeals from Revising Barristers.	Section Forty-two.
41 & 42 Vict. c 30	General Police and Improvement (Scotland) Amendment Act 1878	An Act to alter the time of electing Commissioners under the General Police and Improvement (Scotland) Act, 1862.	Section Two. Section Three, the last proviso.
41 & 42 Vict. c 35	Supreme Court of Judicature (Officers) Act 1878	An Act to extend for a further limited Period Section Thirty-four of the Supreme Court of Judicature Act, 1875.	The whole act.
41 & 42 Vict. c 36	Police (Expenses) Continuance Act 1878	An Act to continue for One Year the Police (Expenses) Act, 1875.	The whole act.
41 & 42 Vict. c 37	Metropolitan Board of Works (Money) Act 1878	An Act to further amend the Acts relating to the raising of Money by the Metropolitan Board of Works; and for other purposes relating thereto.	Sections Three and Four. Section Five, the first two paragraphs. Sections Six to Nine. Section Ten, the first three paragraphs. Section Eleven, the first three paragraphs. Section Twelve, the first three and last paragraphs. Sections Thirteen to Twenty-one. The Schedule.
41 & 42 Vict. c 39	Freshwater Fisheries Act 1878	An Act for the protection of Freshwater Fish.	Section Thirteen.
41 & 42 Vict. c 45	Consolidated Fund (No. 4) Act 1878	An Act to apply the Sum of Fourteen millions five hundred thousand pounds out of the Consolidated Fund to the Service of the Year ending on the Thirty-first day of March One thousand eight hundred and seventy-nine.	The whole act.
41 & 42 Vict. c 47	Elders Widows' Fund (India) Act 1878	An Act to enable the Trustees of the Elders Widows' Fund to apply the Capital of the said Fund in aid of Income; and for other purposes in relation thereto.	Section One.
41 & 42 Vict. c 48	Endowed Institutions (Scotland) Act 1878	An Act to amend the Law relating to Endowed Schools and Hospitals and other Endowed Institutions in Scotland; and for other purposes.	The whole act.
41 & 42 Vict. c 49	Weights and Measures Act 1878	An Act to consolidate the Law relating to Weights and Measures.	Section Eighty-six from "and all weights and measures which" in sub-section (4.) to end of that section.
41 & 42 Vict. c 50	County of Hertford Act 1878	An Act to amend the County of Hertford and Liberty of St. Alban Act, 1874.	Sections Two and Six.
41 & 42 Vict. c 51	Roads and Bridges (Scotland) Act 1878	An Act to alter and amend the Law in regard to the Maintenance and Management of Roads and Bridges in Scotland.	Section Four, the last two paragraphs. Section Ninety-four to "cease to exist; and" Section One hundred and twenty-two.
41 & 42 Vict. c 52	Public Health (Ireland) Act 1878	An Act to consolidate and amend the Acts relating to Public Health in Ireland.	Sections Two hundred and ninety one and Two hundred and ninety-four. Schedule A., the headnote, and the third column.
41 & 42 Vict. c 53	Admiralty and War Office Regulation Act 1878	An Act to facilitate Improvements in the Organisation of the Admiralty and War Office by the retirement of Clerks from certain of the Civil Departments thereof.	Sections One to Six, Ten, and Eleven.
41 & 42 Vict. c 62	Annual Turnpike Acts Continuance Act 1878	An Act to continue certain Turnpike Acts, and to repeal certain other Turnpike Acts; and for other purposes connected therewith.	Sections One to Eight. Section Nine, the last paragraph. The Schedules. Provided that the repeal shall take effect with respect to 19 & 20 Vict. c. lxiv. (mentioned in the Third Schedule) from the date mentioned for the continuation thereof.
41 & 42 Vict. c 64	Exchequer Bonds and Bills (No. 2) Act 1878	An Act to raise the Sum of Two million pounds by Exchequer Bonds, Exchequer Bills, or Treasury Bills for the Service of the Year ending on the 31st day of March 1879.	The whole act.
41 & 42 Vict. c 65	Appropriation Act 1878	An Act to apply a Sum out of the Consolidated Fund to the Service of the Year ending the Thirty-first day of March One thousand eight hundred and seventy-nine, and to appropriate the Supplies granted in this Session of Parliament.	The whole act.
41 & 42 Vict. c 66	Intermediate Education (Ireland) Act 1878	An Act to promote Intermediate Education in Ireland.	Section Six, the last paragraph. The Schedule.
41 & 42 Vict. c 67	Foreign Jurisdiction Act 1878	An Act for extending and amending the Foreign Jurisdiction Acts.	Section Two. First Schedule, the entry relating to 6 & 7 Vict. c. 34. Second Schedule. Repealed as to all Her Majesty's Dominions.
41 & 42 Vict. c 69	Petty Sessions Clerks and Fines (Ireland) Act 1878	An Act to amend the Law regulating the Office of Clerk of Petty Sessions, and the Law relating to Fines, in Ireland; and for other purposes.	Section Two to "repealed; and". Section Four to "repealed; and". Section Ten to "instead thereof".
41 & 42 Vict. c 70	Expiring Laws Continuance Act 1878	An Act to continue various expiring Laws.	The whole act.
41 & 42 Vict. c 72	Sale of Liquors on Sunday (Ireland) Act 1878	An Act to prohibit the Sale of Intoxicating Liquors on Sunday in Ireland.	Section Four, the proviso.
41 & 42 Vict. c 74	Contagious Diseases (Animals) Act 1878	An Act for making better provision respecting Contagious and Infectious Diseases of Cattle and other Animals; and for other purposes.	Section Four, except the last paragraph. Section Thirty-five, paragraph (2.) from "and until" to end of that paragraph. The First Schedule.
41 & 42 Vict. c 77	Highways and Locomotives (Amendment) Act 1878	An Act to amend the Law relating to Highways in England and the Acts relating to Locomotives on Roads; and for other purposes.	Section Nine, the fourth paragraph to "district fund, and" and the last paragraph. Section Twelve.
41 & 42 Vict. c 78	Education (Scotland) Act 1878	An Act to further amend the Provisions of the Law of Scotland on the subject of Education, and for other purposes connected therewith.	Section Fourteen.

== See also ==
- Statute Law Revision Act
