= Mutiny Act 1873 =

Act of the Parliament of the United Kingdom

- Act of Parliament
- Parliament of the United Kingdom
- Long title: An Act for punishing Mutiny and Desertion, and for the better payment of the Army and their Quarters.
- Citation: 36 & 37 Vict. c. 10
- Territorial extent: United Kingdom; Channel Islands; (Note: Section 3.)

Dates
- Royal assent: 24 April 1873
- Commencement: 24 April 1873 (Note: The Acts of Parliament (Commencement) Act 1793.)
- Repealed: 25 August 1883
Other legislation
Repealed by	Statute Law Revision Act 1883

Status: Repealed

Text of statute as originally enacted

The Mutiny Act 1873 (36 & 37 Vict. c. 10) was an act of the Parliament of the United Kingdom, and one of a succession of such Mutiny Acts.

The preamble to the act stated that it was necessary to provide "a more speedy punishment than the usual forms often allow" to soldiers who mutinied or stirred up sedition, who deserted, or who were "guilty of crimes and offences to the prejudice of good order and military discipline". It extended to the Channel Islands, and encompassed colonial and foreign troops in British service, though the militia, volunteer and reserve forces were exempt except under special circumstances.

The act provided for the forms and functions of courts-martial, and defined which crimes were punishable by death, penal servitude, or corporal punishment. Those acquitted by a civil court were not to be tried again for the same offence by a court-martial.

It provided full regulations for military prisons and the custody of prisoners.

Rules were provided for the apprehension of deserters within the UK, and for their temporary custody in gaols. Recruits who deserted before joining their regiment forfeited their bounty, and could be transferred to the nearest regiment, corps or depot.

== Subsequent developments ==
The whole act was repealed by section 1 of, and the schedule to, the Statute Law Revision Act 1878 (46 & 47 Vict. c. 39), which came into force on 25 August 1883.

== Bibliography ==
- The companion to the British almanac, for the year 1874, p. 224-5. London, 1875.
- Chronological table of the statutes; HMSO, London. 1993. ISBN 0-11-840331-1
