= Protection of Life and Property in Certain Parts of Ireland Act 1871 =

Act of the Parliament of the United Kingdom

Protection of Life and Property in certain parts of Ireland Act 1871 (Note: Section 1.)
- Act of Parliament
- Parliament of the United Kingdom
- Long title: An Act to empower the Lord Lieutenant or other Chief Governor or Governors of Ireland to apprehend and detain for a limited time persons suspected of being members of the Ribbon Society, or of being concerned in the commission of any crime or outrage under the direction or influence of said Ribbon Society in the county of Westmeath, or in certain adjoining portions of the county of Meath and the King's County; and to continue "The Peace Preservation (Ireland) Act, 1870."
- Citation: 34 & 35 Vict. c. 25
- Territorial extent: Ireland (Note: Section 2.)

Dates
- Royal assent: 16 June 1871
- Commencement: 16 June 1871 (Note: The Acts of Parliament (Commencement) Act 1793.)
- Repealed: 25 August 1883
Other legislation
Amends	Peace Preservation (Ireland) Act 1870
Repealed by	Statute Law Revision Act 1883

Status: Repealed

Text of statute as originally enacted

The Protection of Life and Property in Certain Parts of Ireland Act 1871 (34 & 35 Vict. c. 25), also known as the Protection of Life and Property (Ireland) Act 1871, was an act of the Parliament of the United Kingdom. It was one element of the special emergency legislation that had been applied to Ireland by Westminster during the 19th and 20th centuries. The act was also known as the Westmeath Act

The act permitted the arrest and detention without trial of persons reasonably suspected of membership in a secret society and effectively suspended habeas corpus in Ireland.

== Subsequent developments ==
The whole act was repealed by section 1 of, and the schedule to, the Statute Law Revision Act 1878 (46 & 47 Vict. c. 39), which came into force on 25 August 1883.
