= List of acts of the Parliament of the United Kingdom from 1878 =

This is a complete list of acts of the Parliament of the United Kingdom for the year 1878.

Note that the first parliament of the United Kingdom was held in 1801; parliaments between 1707 and 1800 were either parliaments of Great Britain or of Ireland). For acts passed up until 1707, see the list of acts of the Parliament of England and the list of acts of the Parliament of Scotland. For acts passed from 1707 to 1800, see the list of acts of the Parliament of Great Britain. See also the list of acts of the Parliament of Ireland.

For acts of the devolved parliaments and assemblies in the United Kingdom, see the list of acts of the Scottish Parliament, the list of acts of the Northern Ireland Assembly, and the list of acts and measures of Senedd Cymru; see also the list of acts of the Parliament of Northern Ireland.

The number shown after each act's title is its chapter number. Acts passed before 1963 are cited using this number, preceded by the year(s) of the reign during which the relevant parliamentary session was held; thus the Union with Ireland Act 1800 is cited as "39 & 40 Geo. 3 c. 67", meaning the 67th act passed during the session that started in the 39th year of the reign of George III and which finished in the 40th year of that reign. Note that the modern convention is to use Arabic numerals in citations (thus "41 Geo. 3" rather than "41 Geo. III"). Acts of the last session of the Parliament of Great Britain and the first session of the Parliament of the United Kingdom are both cited as "41 Geo. 3".

Some of these acts have a short title. Some of these acts have never had a short title. Some of these acts have a short title given to them by later acts, such as by the Short Titles Act 1896.

== 41 & 42 Vict. ==
The fifth session of the 21st Parliament of the United Kingdom, which met from 17 January 1878 until 16 August 1878.

=== Public general acts ===
Short title	Citation	Royal assent
Long title
Consolidated Fund Act (6,000,000l.) (repealed)	41 & 42 Vict. c. 1	25 February 1878
An Act to apply the sum of Six million pounds out of the Consolidated Fund to the service of the year ending the thirty-first day of March one thousand eight hundred and seventy-eight. (Repealed by Statute Law Revision Act 1883 (46 & 47 Vict. c. 39))
Exchequer Bills and Bonds Act 1878 (repealed)	41 & 42 Vict. c. 2	25 February 1878
An Act to raise the sum of Six million pounds by Exchequer Bonds, Exchequer Bills, or Treasury Bills. (Repealed by Statute Law Revision Act 1883 (46 & 47 Vict. c. 39))
House Occupiers Disqualification Removal Act 1878 (repealed)	41 & 42 Vict. c. 3	25 February 1878
An Act to relieve certain Occupiers of Dwelling-houses from being disqualified from the right of voting in the Election of Members to serve in Parliament by reason of their under-letting such Dwelling-houses for short terms. (Repealed by Representation of the People Act 1918 (7 & 8 Geo. 5. c. 64))
Parliamentary Elections (Metropolis) Act 1878 (repealed)	41 & 42 Vict. c. 4	25 February 1878
An Act to extend the hours of Polling at Parliamentary Elections in the Metropolis. (Repealed by Elections (Hours of Poll) Act 1885 (48 & 49 Vict. c. 10))
House Occupiers Disqualification Removal (Scotland) Act 1878 (repealed)	41 & 42 Vict. c. 5	18 March 1878
An Act to relieve certain Occupiers of Dwelling-houses in Scotland from being disqualified from the right of voting in the Election of Members to serve in Parliament by reason of their under-letting such Dwelling-houses for short terms. (Repealed by Representation of the People Act 1918 (7 & 8 Geo. 5. c. 64))
Glebe Loan (Ireland) Amendment Act 1878 (repealed)	41 & 42 Vict. c. 6	18 March 1878
An Act to amend the Glebe Loan (Ireland) Amendment Act, 1875. (Note: Glebe Loan (Ireland) Amendment Act 1875 (38 & 39 Vict. c. 30)) (Repealed by Statute Law Revision Act 1883 (46 & 47 Vict. c. 39))
Exchequer Bonds Act 1878 (repealed)	41 & 42 Vict. c. 7	18 March 1878
An Act to raise the sum of One million Pounds by Exchequer Bonds, for the service of the year ending on the thirty-first day of March one thousand eight hundred and seventy-eight. (Repealed by Statute Law Revision Act 1883 (46 & 47 Vict. c. 39))
Public Parks (Scotland) Act 1878 (repealed)	41 & 42 Vict. c. 8	18 March 1878
An Act to enable Local Authorities to acquire and lay out land for Public Parks and Pleasure Grounds in Scotland. (Repealed by Local Government and Planning (Scotland) Act 1982 (c. 43))
Consolidated Fund (No. 2) Act 1878 (repealed)	41 & 42 Vict. c. 9	28 March 1878
An Act to apply certain Sums out of the Consolidated Fund to the service of the years ending on the thirty-first day of March one thousand eight hundred and seventy-seven, one thousand eight hundred and seventy-eight, and one thousand eight hundred and seventy-nine. (Repealed by Statute Law Revision Act 1883 (46 & 47 Vict. c. 39))
Mutiny Act 1878 (repealed)	41 & 42 Vict. c. 10	16 April 1878
An Act for punishing Mutiny and Desertion, and for the better payment of the Army and their Quarters. (Repealed by Statute Law Revision Act 1883 (46 & 47 Vict. c. 39))
Marine Mutiny Act 1878 (repealed)	41 & 42 Vict. c. 11	16 April 1878
An Act for the Regulation of Her Majesty's Royal Marine Forces while on shore. (Repealed by Regulation of the Forces Act 1881 (44 & 45 Vict. c. 57))
Threshing Machines Act 1878 (repealed)	41 & 42 Vict. c. 12	16 April 1878
An Act for the prevention of Accidents by Threshing Machines. (Repealed by Agriculture (Safety, Health and Welfare Provisions) Act 1956 (4 & 5 Eliz. 2. c. 49))
Bills of Exchange Act 1878 (repealed)	41 & 42 Vict. c. 13	16 April 1878
An Act to declare the law relating to the Acceptance of Bills of Exchange. (Repealed by Bills of Exchange Act 1882 (45 & 46 Vict. c. 61))
Baths and Washhouses Act 1878 (repealed)	41 & 42 Vict. c. 14	27 May 1878
An Act to amend the Law relating to Public Baths and Washhouses. (Repealed by Statute Law (Repeals) Act 1976 (c. 16))
Customs and Inland Revenue Act 1878 (repealed)	41 & 42 Vict. c. 15	27 May 1878
An Act to grant certain Duties of Customs and Inland Revenue, to alter other Duties, and to amend the Laws relating to Customs and Inland Revenue. (Repealed by Statute Law (Repeals) Act 1973 (c. 39))
Factory and Workshop Act 1878 (repealed)	41 & 42 Vict. c. 16	27 May 1878
An Act to consolidate and amend the Law relating to Factories and Workshops. (Repealed by Factory and Workshop Act 1901 (1 Edw. 7. c. 22))
Adulteration of Seeds Act 1878 (repealed)	41 & 42 Vict. c. 17	27 May 1878
An Act to amend the Adulteration of Seeds Act, 1869. (Note: Adulteration of Seeds Act 1869 (32 & 33 Vict. c. 112)) (Repealed by Plant Varieties and Seeds Act 1964 (c. 14))
Public Works Loans Act 1878 (repealed)	41 & 42 Vict. c. 18	27 May 1878
An Act to grant Money for the purpose of Loans by the Public Works Loan Commissioners and by the Commissioners of Public Works in Ireland, and to authorise the former Commissioners to compound and cancel certain loans and interest, and to amend the Public Works Loans Act, 1875. (Note: Public Works Loans Act 1875 (38 & 39 Vict. c. 89)) (Repealed by National Loans Act 1968 (c. 13))
Matrimonial Causes Act 1878 (repealed)	41 & 42 Vict. c. 19	27 May 1878
An Act to amend the Matrimonial Causes Acts. (Repealed for England and Wales by Supreme Court of Judicature (Consolidation) Act 1925 (15 & 16 Geo. 5. c. 49) and for Northern Ireland by Summary Jurisdiction (Separation and Maintenance) Act (Northern Ireland) 1945 (c. 14 (N.I.)) and Statute Law Revision Act (Northern Ireland) 1953 (c. 1 (N.I.)))
Railway Returns (Continuous Brakes) Act 1878 (repealed)	41 & 42 Vict. c. 20	17 June 1878
An Act to provide for returns respecting Continuous Brakes in use on Passenger Trains on Railways. (Repealed by Statute Law Revision Act 1960 (8 & 9 Eliz. 2. c. 56))
Consolidated Fund (No. 3) Act 1878 (repealed)	41 & 42 Vict. c. 21	17 June 1878
An Act to apply the sum of Seven million five hundred thousand pounds out of the Consolidated Fund to the service of the year ending on the thirty-first day of March one thousand eight hundred and seventy-nine. (Repealed by Statute Law Revision Act 1883 (46 & 47 Vict. c. 39))
Exchequer Bonds (No. 2) Act 1878 (repealed)	41 & 42 Vict. c. 22	17 June 1878
An Act to raise the sum of One million five hundred thousand pounds by Exchequer Bonds, for the service of the year ending on the thirty-first day of March one thousand eight hundred and seventy-nine. (Repealed by Statute Law Revision Act 1883 (46 & 47 Vict. c. 39))
Acknowledgement of Deeds by Married Women (Ireland) Act 1878 (repealed)	41 & 42 Vict. c. 23	17 June 1878
An Act to remove doubts concerning the due Acknowledgment of Deeds by Married Women in Ireland in certain cases. (Repealed by Conveyancing Act 1882 (45 & 46 Vict. c. 39))
Lunatic Asylums Loans (Ireland) Act 1878 (repealed)	41 & 42 Vict. c. 24	4 July 1878
An Act to amend the Public Works Loans (Ireland) Act, 1877, (Note: Public Works Loans (Ireland) Act 1877 (40 & 41 Vict. c. 27)) so far as relates to Lunatic Asylums. (Repealed by Local Government (Ireland) Act 1898 (61 & 62 Vict. c. 37))
Public Health (Water) Act 1878 (repealed)	41 & 42 Vict. c. 25	4 July 1878
An Act to amend the Public Health Act, 1875, (Note: Public Health Act 1875 (38 & 39 Vict. c. 55)) so far as relates to the supply of Water. (Repealed by Public Health Act 1936 (26 Geo. 5 & 1 Edw. 8. c. 49))
Parliamentary and Municipal Registration Act 1878 (repealed)	41 & 42 Vict. c. 26	22 July 1878
An Act to amend the Law relating to the Registration of Voters in Parliamentary Boroughs and the Enrolment of Burgesses in Municipal Boroughs, and relating to certain rights of voting and proceedings before and appeals from Revising Barristers. (Repealed by Local Government Act 1966 (c. 42))
Supreme Court of Judicature Act (Ireland) 1877 Amendment Act 1878 (repealed)	41 & 42 Vict. c. 27	22 July 1878
An Act to amend the Supreme Court of Judicature Act (Ireland), 1877. (Note: Supreme Court of Judicature Act (Ireland) 1877 (40 & 41 Vict. c. 57)) (Repealed by Administration of Justice (Northern Ireland) Order 1975 (SI 1975/816 (N.I. 7)))
Entail Amendment (Scotland) Act 1878 (repealed)	41 & 42 Vict. c. 28	22 July 1878
An Act to further amend the Law of Entail in Scotland. (Repealed by Abolition of Feudal Tenure etc. (Scotland) Act 2000 (asp 5))
Monuments (Metropolis) Act 1878	41 & 42 Vict. c. 29	22 July 1878
An Act for conferring powers upon the Metropolitan Board of Works with respect to the Obelisk known as Cleopatra's Needle, and other Monuments.
General Police and Improvement (Scotland) Amendment Act 1878 (repealed)	41 & 42 Vict. c. 30	22 July 1878
An Act to alter the time of electing Commissioners under the General Police and Improvement (Scotland) Act, 1862. (Note: General Police and Improvement (Scotland) Act 1862 (25 & 26 Vict. c. 101)) (Repealed by Burgh Police (Scotland) Act 1892 (55 & 56 Vict. c. 55))
Bills of Sale Act 1878	41 & 42 Vict. c. 31	22 July 1878
An Act to consolidate and amend the Law for preventing Frauds upon Creditors by secret Bills of Sale of Personal Chattels.
Metropolis Management and Building Acts Amendment Act 1878 (repealed)	41 & 42 Vict. c. 32	22 July 1878
An Act to amend the Metropolis Management Act, 1855, (Note: Metropolis Management Act 1855 (18 & 19 Vict. c. 120)) the Metropolitan Building Act, 1855, (Note: Metropolitan Building Act 1855 (18 & 19 Vict. c. 122)) and the Acts amending the same respectively. (Repealed by London Government Act 1963 (c. 33))
Dentists Act 1878 (repealed)	41 & 42 Vict. c. 33	22 July 1878
An Act to amend the Law relating to Dental Practitioners. (Repealed by Statute Law (Repeals) Act 1986 (c. 12))
South Wales Highway Act Amendment Act 1878 (repealed)	41 & 42 Vict. c. 34	22 July 1878
An Act to amend the Law relating to Highways in South Wales. (Repealed by Highways Act 1959 (7 & 8 Eliz. 2. c. 25))
Supreme Court of Judicature (Officers) Act 1878 (repealed)	41 & 42 Vict. c. 35	8 August 1878
An Act to extend for a further limited period section thirty-four of the Supreme Court of Judicature Act, 1875. (Note: Supreme Court of Judicature Act 1875 (38 & 39 Vict. c. 77)) (Repealed by Statute Law Revision Act 1883 (46 & 47 Vict. c. 39))
Police (Expenses) Continuance Act 1878 (repealed)	41 & 42 Vict. c. 36	8 August 1878
An Act to continue for one year the Police (Expenses) Act, 1875. (Note: Police (Expenses) Act 1875 (38 & 39 Vict. c. 48)) (Repealed by Statute Law Revision Act 1883 (46 & 47 Vict. c. 39))
Metropolitan Board of Works (Money) Act 1878 (repealed)	41 & 42 Vict. c. 37	8 August 1878
An Act to further amend the Acts relating to the raising of Money by the Metropolitan Board of Works; and for other purposes relating thereto. (Repealed by London County Council (Finance Consolidation) Act 1912 (2 & 3 Geo. 5. c. cv))
Innkeepers Act 1878	41 & 42 Vict. c. 38	8 August 1878
An Act for the further relief of Innkeepers.
Freshwater Fisheries Act 1878 (repealed)	41 & 42 Vict. c. 39	8 August 1878
An Act for the Protection of Freshwater Fish. (Repealed by Salmon and Freshwater Fisheries Act 1923 (13 & 14 Geo. 5. c. 16))
Prisons Authorities Act 1874 Amendment Act 1878 (repealed)	41 & 42 Vict. c. 40	8 August 1878
An Act to remove doubts with respect to the application to Scotland of the Prisons Authorities Act, 1874. (Note: Prisons Authorities Act 1874 (37 & 38 Vict. c. 47)) (Repealed by Children Act 1908 (8 Edw. 7. c. 67))
Parliamentary Elections Returning Officers Expenses (Scotland) Act 1878 (repealed)	41 & 42 Vict. c. 41	8 August 1878
An Act to enable Returning Officers at Parliamentary Elections in Scotland to require Security for their Expenses; and otherwise to amend the Law of Scotland relating to such Expenses. (Repealed by Statute Law Revision Act 1894 (57 & 58 Vict. c. 56), Representation of the People Act 1918 (7 & 8 Geo. 5. c. 64), Representation of the People Act 1948 (11 & 12 Geo. 6. c. 65) and Statute Law Revision Act 1950 (14 Geo. 6. c. 6))
Tithe Act 1878 (repealed)	41 & 42 Vict. c. 42	8 August 1878
An Act to amend and further extend the Acts for the Commutation of Tithes in England and Wales. (Repealed by Statute Law (Repeals) Act 1998 (c. 43))
Marriage Notice (Scotland) Act 1878 (repealed)	41 & 42 Vict. c. 43	8 August 1878
An Act to encourage Regular Marriages in Scotland. (Repealed by Marriage (Scotland) Act 1977 (c. 15))
Truro Chapter Act 1878 (repealed)	41 & 42 Vict. c. 44	8 August 1878
An Act to make provision for the foundation of a Dean and Chapter for the Bishopric of Truro, and for the transfer to the Cathedral Church of Truro of one of the Canonries in the Cathedral Church of Exeter; and for other purposes connected therewith. (Repealed by Truro Cathedral Measure 1959 (No. 1))
Consolidated Fund (No. 4) Act 1878 (repealed)	41 & 42 Vict. c. 45	8 August 1878
An Act to apply the sum of fourteen millions five hundred thousand pounds out of the Consolidated Fund to the service of the year ending on the thirty-first day of March one thousand eight hundred and seventy-nine. (Repealed by Statute Law Revision Act 1883 (46 & 47 Vict. c. 39))
Duke of Connaught and of Strathearn (Establishment) Act 1878 or the Duke of Connaught, Annuity Act 1878 (repealed)	41 & 42 Vict. c. 46	8 August 1878
An Act to enable Her Majesty to provide for the Establishment of His Royal Highness the Duke of Connaught and of Strathearn and Her Royal Highness Princess Louise Margaret Alexandra Victoria Agnes of Prussia, and to settle an Annuity on Her Royal Highness. (Repealed by Statute Law (Repeals) Act 1971 (c. 52))
Elders Widows' Fund (India) Act 1878 (repealed)	41 & 42 Vict. c. 47	8 August 1878
An Act to enable the Trustees of the Elders Widows' Fund to apply the Capital of the said Fund, in aid of Income; and for other purposes in relation thereto. (Repealed by Statute Law (Repeals) Act 1971 (c. 52))
Endowed Institutions (Scotland) Act 1878 (repealed)	41 & 42 Vict. c. 48	8 August 1878
An Act to amend the Law relating to Endowed Schools and Hospitals and other Endowed Institutions in Scotland; and for other purposes. (Repealed by Statute Law Revision Act 1883 (46 & 47 Vict. c. 39))
Weights and Measures Act 1878 (repealed)	41 & 42 Vict. c. 49	8 August 1878
An Act to consolidate the Law relating to Weights and Measures. (Repealed by Statute Law (Repeals) Act 1977 (c. 18) and Weights and Measures Act 1979 (c. 45), for England and Wales and Scotland by Weights and Measures Act 1963 (c. 31) and for Northern Ireland by Weights and Measures Act (Northern Ireland) 1967 (c. 6 (N.I.)), Gas (Northern Ireland) Order 1977 (SI 1977/596 (N.I. 11)) and Weights and Measures (Northern Ireland) Order 1981 (SI 1981/231 (N.I. 10)) (Note: Incorrectly cited as "SI 1981/713" in the Chronological Table of the Statutes.))
County of Hertford Act 1878 (repealed)	41 & 42 Vict. c. 50	8 August 1878
An Act to amend the County of Hertford and Liberty of St. Alban Act, 1874. (Note: County of Hertford and Liberty of St. Alban Act 1874 (37 & 38 Vict. c. 45)) (Repealed by Courts Act 1971 (c. 23))
Roads and Bridges (Scotland) Act 1878 (repealed)	41 & 42 Vict. c. 51	8 August 1878
An Act to alter and amend the Law in regard to the Maintenance and Management of Roads and Bridges in Scotland. (Repealed by Roads (Scotland) Act 1984 (c. 54))
Public Health (Ireland) Act 1878	41 & 42 Vict. c. 52	8 August 1878
An Act to consolidate and amend the Acts relating to Public Health in Ireland.
Admiralty and War Office Regulation Act 1878 (repealed)	41 & 42 Vict. c. 53	13 August 1878
An Act to facilitate improvements in the Organisation of the Admiralty and War Office by the retirement of Clerks from certain of the Civil Departments thereof. (Repealed by Statute Law Revision Act 1883 (46 & 47 Vict. c. 39) and Statute Law Revision Act 1950 (14 Geo. 6. c. 6))
Debtors Act 1878	41 & 42 Vict. c. 54	13 August 1878
An Act to amend the Debtors Act, 1869, (Note: Debtors Act 1869 (32 & 33 Vict. c. 62)) and the Debtors Act (Ireland), 1872. (Note: Debtors Act (Ireland) 1872 (35 & 36 Vict. c. 57)) (Repealed for Northern Ireland by Judgments (Enforcement) Act (Northern Ireland) 1969 (c. 30 (N.I.)))
British Museum Act 1878 (repealed)	41 & 42 Vict. c. 55	13 August 1878
An Act to enable the Trustees of the British Museum to remove portions of their Collections. (Repealed by British Museum Act 1963 (c. 24))
Commons (Expenses) Act 1878	41 & 42 Vict. c. 56	13 August 1878
An Act to amend the Law respecting the expense of regulating Commons.
Statute Law Revision (Ireland) Act 1878	41 & 42 Vict. c. 57	13 August 1878
An Act for the Revision of the Statute Law of Ireland.
Locomotives Amendment (Scotland) Act 1878 (repealed)	41 & 42 Vict. c. 58	16 August 1878
An Act for further regulating the use of Locomotives on Highways in Scotland. (Repealed by Road Traffic Act 1930 (20 & 21 Geo. 5. c. 43))
Drainage and Improvement of Lands (Ireland) Act 1878 (repealed)	41 & 42 Vict. c. 59	16 August 1878
An Act to amend the Law relating to the Drainage and Improvement of Land in Ireland. (Repealed by Erne Drainage and Development Act (Northern Ireland) 1950 (c. 15 (N.I.)))
Poor Afflicted Persons Relief (Ireland) Act 1878 (repealed)	41 & 42 Vict. c. 60	16 August 1878
An Act to make better provision for Idiots, Imbeciles, and other afflicted persons in Ireland. (Repealed by Health and Personal Social Services (Northern Ireland) Order 1972 (SI 1972/1265 (N.I. 14)))
Fiji Marriage Act 1878 (repealed)	41 & 42 Vict. c. 61	16 August 1878
An Act to remove doubts as to the validity of certain Marriages solemnized in the Islands of Fiji prior to their erection into a British Colony. (Repealed by Foreign Marriage (Amendment) Act 1988 (c. 44))
Annual Turnpike Acts Continuance Act 1878 (repealed)	41 & 42 Vict. c. 62	16 August 1878
An Act to continue certain Turnpike Acts, and to repeal certain other Turnpike Acts; and for other purposes connected therewith. (Repealed by Statute Law Revision Act 1898 (61 & 62 Vict. c. 22))
Prison (Officers Superannuation) Act 1878 (repealed)	41 & 42 Vict. c. 63	16 August 1878
An Act to amend the Prison Acts of 1877, so far as regards the Apportionment of certain Superannuation Allowances between the Treasury and the Local Authorities. (Repealed by Statute Law Revision Act 1950 (14 Geo. 6. c. 6))
Exchequer Bonds and Bills (No. 2) Act 1878 (repealed)	41 & 42 Vict. c. 64	16 August 1878
An Act to raise the sum of two million pounds by Exchequer Bonds, Exchequer Bills, or Treasury Bills for the Service of the year ending on the 81st day of March 1879. (Repealed by Statute Law Revision Act 1883 (46 & 47 Vict. c. 39))
Appropriation Act 1878 (repealed)	41 & 42 Vict. c. 65	16 August 1878
An Act to apply a sum out of the Consolidated Fund to the service of the year ending the thirty-first day of March one thousand eight hundred and seventy-nine, and to appropriate the Supplies granted in this Session of Parliament. (Repealed by Statute Law Revision Act 1883 (46 & 47 Vict. c. 39))
Intermediate Education (Ireland) Act 1878 (repealed)	41 & 42 Vict. c. 66	16 August 1878
An Act to promote Intermediate Education in Ireland. (Repealed by Education Act (Northern Ireland) 1923 (13 & 14 Geo. 5. c. 21 (N.I.)))
Foreign Jurisdiction Act 1878 (repealed)	41 & 42 Vict. c. 67	16 August 1878
An Act for extending and amending the Foreign Jurisdiction Acts. (Repealed by Foreign Jurisdiction Act 1890 (53 & 54 Vict. c. 37))
Bishoprics Act 1878	41 & 42 Vict. c. 68	16 August 1878
An Act to provide for the foundation of four new Bishoprics in England.
Petty Sessions Clerks and Fines (Ireland) Act 1878	41 & 42 Vict. c. 69	16 August 1878
An Act to amend the Law regulating the Office of Clerk of Petty Sessions, and the Law relating to Fines, in Ireland; and for other purposes.
Expiring Laws Continuance Act 1878 (repealed)	41 & 42 Vict. c. 70	16 August 1878
An Act to continue various expiring Laws. (Repealed by Statute Law Revision Act 1883 (46 & 47 Vict. c. 39))
Metropolitan Commons Act 1878	41 & 42 Vict. c. 71	16 August 1878
An Act to extend to Metropolitan Commons certain provisions of the Commons Act, 1876.
Sale of Liquors on Sunday (Ireland) Act 1878 (repealed)	41 & 42 Vict. c. 72	16 August 1878
An Act to prohibit the sale of Intoxicating Liquors on Sunday in Ireland. (Repealed by Intoxicating Liquor Act (Northern Ireland) 1923 (13 & 14 Geo. 5. c. 12 (N.I.)))
Territorial Waters Jurisdiction Act 1878	41 & 42 Vict. c. 73	16 August 1878
An Act to regulate the Law relating to the Trial of Offences committed on the Sea within a certain distance of the Coasts of Her Majesty's Dominions.
Contagious Diseases (Animals) Act 1878 (repealed)	41 & 42 Vict. c. 74	16 August 1878
An Act for making better provision respecting Contagious and Infectious Diseases of Cattle and other Animals; and for other purposes. (Repealed for England and Wales and Scotland by Public Health (London) Act 1891 (54 & 55 Vict. c. 76), Diseases of Animals Act 1894 (57 & 58 Vict. c. 57), Milk and Dairies (Scotland) Act 1914 (4 & 5 Geo. 5. c. 46) and Milk and Dairies (Consolidation) Act 1915 (5 & 6 Geo. 5. c. 66) and for Northern Ireland by Food and Drugs Act (Northern Ireland) 1958 (c. 27 (N.I.)))
Arranmore Polling District Act 1878 (repealed)	41 & 42 Vict. c. 75	16 August 1878
An Act to amend the Law in respect to the Polling District of Arranmore (Ireland). (Repealed by Statute Law (Repeals) Act 1993 (c. 50))
Telegraph Act 1878 (repealed)	41 & 42 Vict. c. 76	16 August 1878
An Act to make further provision respecting the Post Office Telegraphs. (Repealed by Telecommunications Act 1984 (c. 12))
Highways and Locomotives (Amendment) Act 1878 (repealed)	41 & 42 Vict. c. 77	16 August 1878
An Act to amend the Law relating to Highways in England and the Acts relating to Locomotives on Roads; and for other purposes. (Repealed by Statute Law (Repeals) Act 1993 (c. 50))
Education (Scotland) Act 1878 (repealed)	41 & 42 Vict. c. 78	16 August 1878
An Act to further amend the provisions of the Law of Scotland on the subject of Education, and for other purposes connected therewith. (Repealed by Statute Law Revision Act 1883 (46 & 47 Vict. c. 39), Statute Law Revision Act 1894 (57 & 58 Vict. c. 56), Education (Scotland) Act 1883 (46 & 47 Vict. c. 56), Local Government (Scotland) Act 1889 (52 & 53 Vict. c. 50) and Education (Scotland) Act 1945 (8 & 9 Geo. 6. c. 37))
Statute Law Revision Act 1878 (repealed)	41 & 42 Vict. c. 79	16 August 1878
An Act for further promoting the Revision of the Statute Law by repealing certain Enactments which have ceased to be in force or have become unnecessary. (Repealed by Statute Law (Repeals) Act 1998 (c. 43))

=== Local acts ===
Short title	Citation	Royal assent
Long title
Linen and Yarn Halls (Dublin) Act 1878	41 & 42 Vict. c. i	25 February 1878
An Act to amend an Act passed in the ninth year of the reign of His late Majesty King George the Fourth, chapter sixty-two, so far as the same relates to the Linen and Yarn Halls in the City of Dublin.
Brighton Aquarium (Capital) Act 1878 (repealed)	41 & 42 Vict. c. ii	28 March 1878
An Act to enable the Brighton Aquarium Company to raise additional Capital. (Repealed by Brighton Corporation Act 1901 (1 Edw. 7. c. ccxxiv))
Royal Bank of Scotland Officers Widows Fund (Amendment) Act 1878 (repealed)	41 & 42 Vict. c. iii	28 March 1878
An Act for amending the Royal Bank of Scotland Officers Widows Fund Act, 1870. (Repealed by Royal Bank of Scotland Officers' Widows' Fund Order Confirmation Act 1949 (12, 13 & 14 Geo. 6. c. xiii))
Aspinwall's Patent Act 1878	41 & 42 Vict. c. iv	28 March 1878
An Act for rendering valid certain Letters Patent granted to Lewis Augustus Aspinwall for "a new or improved implement for planting Potatoes."
Birkenhead, Chester, and North Wales Railway (Abandonment) Act 1878 (repealed)	41 & 42 Vict. c. v	28 March 1878
An Act for the abandonment of the Railway authorised by the Birkenhead, Chester, and North Wales Railway Act, 1873. (Note: Birkenhead, Chester, and North Wales Railway Act 1873 (36 & 37 Vict. c. ccxli)) (Repealed by Statute Law (Repeals) Act 2013 (c. 2))
Bodmin and Wadebridge and Delabole Railway (Abandonment) Act 1878 (repealed)	41 & 42 Vict. c. vi	28 March 1878
An Act for the abandonment of the Undertaking of the Bodmin and Wadebridge and Delabole Railway Company; and for other purposes. (Repealed by Statute Law (Repeals) Act 2013 (c. 2))
Cornwall Mineral and Bodmin and Wadebridge Junction Railway (Abandonment) Act 1878 (repealed)	41 & 42 Vict. c. vii	28 March 1878
An Act for the abandonment of the Cornwall Mineral and Bodmin and Wadebridge Junction Railway; and for other purposes. (Repealed by Statute Law (Repeals) Act 2013 (c. 2))
Local Government Board's Provisional Orders Confirmation (Bristol, &c.) Act 1878	41 & 42 Vict. c. viii	16 April 1878
An Act to confirm certain Provisional Orders of the Local Government Board relating to the City of Bristol, the Rural Sanitary District of Chester-le-Street Union, the Local Government District of Finchley, the Rural Sanitary District of the Newbury Union, and the Local Government Districts of Wallasey and West Derby.
	Bristol Order 1878	
	Chester-le-Street Union Order 1878	
	Finchley Order 1878	
	Newbury Union Order 1878	
	Wallasey Order 1878	
	West Derby Order 1878	
Hartlepool Gas and Water Act 1878 (repealed)	41 & 42 Vict. c. ix	16 April 1878
An Act to confer additional powers upon the Hartlepool Gas and Water Company. (Repealed by Hartlepools Water (Consolidation, etc.) Order 1986 (SI 1986/401))
Brading Harbour District Gas Act 1878 (repealed)	41 & 42 Vict. c. x	16 April 1878
An Act for incorporating "The Brading Harbour District Gas Company," and enabling them to construct Gasworks and light with Gas parts of the parishes of Brading and Saint Helen's, in the Isle of Wight, in the county of Southampton. (Repealed by Ryde Gas Order 1923 (SR&O 1923/350))
Deal Water Act 1878	41 & 42 Vict. c. xi	16 April 1878
An Act to confer further powers upon the Company of Proprietors of the Deal Waterworks; to authorise the Company to raise additional Capital; and for other purposes.
Serle Street and Cook's Court Improvement Act 1878	41 & 42 Vict. c. xii	16 April 1878
An Act to confirm an agreement between the Serle Street and Cook's Court Improvement Company and the Royal Insurance Company; and for other purposes.
Swindon, Marlborough, and Andover Railway Act 1878	41 & 42 Vict. c. xiii	16 April 1878
An Act to extend the time granted to the Swindon, Marlborough, and Andover Railway Company for the completion of certain railways and works; and for other purposes.
Sevenoaks Waterworks Act 1878	41 & 42 Vict. c. xiv	16 April 1878
An Act to dissolve and re-incorporate the Sevenoaks Waterworks Company, Limited, and to extend their Limits of Supply; and for other purposes.
Bala and Festiniog Railway Act 1878	41 & 42 Vict. c. xv	16 April 1878
An Act to authorise an extension of time for the completion of the Bala and Festiniog Railway.
Dublin Corporation Waterworks Acts Amendment Act 1878	41 & 42 Vict. c. xvi	16 April 1878
An Act to enable the Corporation of Dublin to construct additional Waterworks; and for other purposes.
Imperial Continental Gas Association Act 1878 (repealed)	41 & 42 Vict. c. xvii	16 April 1878
An Act for granting further powers to the Imperial Continental Gas Association. (Repealed by Imperial Continental Gas Association Act 1929 (19 & 20 Geo. 5. c. lxxxix))
Farnworth and Kearsley Gas Act 1878	41 & 42 Vict. c. xviii	16 April 1878
An Act for conferring further powers on the Farnworth and Kearsley Gas Company for the purchase of land, the construction of works, the raising of money, and otherwise in relation to their undertaking.
Exeter Chapel of St. John's Hospital Act 1878	41 & 42 Vict. c. xix	16 April 1878
An Act to provide for the sale and removal of the Chapel of Saint John's Hospital, in the parish of Saint Lawrence in the city of Exeter, and th application of the purchase money to arise from such sale; and for other purposes.
Newent Railway Act 1878	41 & 42 Vict. c. xx	16 April 1878
An Act for extending the time for the completion of the Newent Railway and for other purposes.
Ross and Ledbury Railway Act 1878	41 & 42 Vict. c. xxi	16 April 1878
An Act for extending the time for the completion of the Railway No. 3 authorised by the Ross and Ledbury Railway Act, 1873; (Note: Ross and Ledbury Railway Act 1873 (36 & 37 Vict. c. ccii)) and for other purposes.
London and Saint Katharine Docks Act 1878 (repealed)	41 & 42 Vict. c. xxii	16 April 1878
An Act to enable the London and Saint Katharine Docks Company to raise further money. (Repealed by Port of London (Consolidation) Act 1920 (10 & 11 Geo. 5. c. clxxiii))
Legal and General Life Assurance Society's Act 1878 (repealed)	41 & 42 Vict. c. xxiii	16 April 1878
An Act to enable the Legal and General Life Assurance Society to sue and be sued in the name of a public officer, and to make provision as to the vesting of the funds and property of the Society in the trustees from time to time of the Society; and for other purposes. (Repealed by Legal and General Assurance Society Limited Act 1922 (12 & 13 Geo. 5. c. xvii))
Charnwood Forest Railway Act 1878	41 & 42 Vict. c. xxiv	16 April 1878
An Act to authorise the Charnwood Forest Railway Company to divert portions of their authorised lines; and for other purposes.
Somerset and Dorset Railway (Nettlebridge Branch Railway Abandonment) Act 1878 (repealed)	41 & 42 Vict. c. xxv	16 April 1878
An Act for the abandonment of the Nettlebridge Branch Railway authorised by the Somerset and Dorset Railway Act, 1873; (Note: Somerset and Dorset Railway Act 1873 (36 & 37 Vict. c. ccli)) and for other purposes. (Repealed by Statute Law (Repeals) Act 2013 (c. 2))
Torquay Gas Act 1878	41 & 42 Vict. c. xxvi	16 April 1878
An Act for conferring further powers on the Torquay Gas Company.
Batley Corporation Waterworks Act 1878 (repealed)	41 & 42 Vict. c. xxvii	16 April 1878
An Act to amend the Batley Corporation Waterworks Act, 1871, (Note: Batley Corporation Waterworks Act 1871 (34 & 35 Vict. c. xl)) and other Acts affecting the Corporation of Batley; and for other purposes. (Repealed by Mid Calder Water Board Order 1965 (SI 1965/2006))
Isle of Wight (Newport Junction) Railway Act 1878	41 & 42 Vict. c. xxviii	16 April 1878
An Act for reviving the powers and extending the time for the completion of a portion of the Railway and Works authorised by the Isle of Wight (Newport Junction) Railway Act, 1872; (Note: Isle of Wight (Newport Junction) Railway Act 1872 (35 & 36 Vict. c. clxix)) and for other purposes.
Saint James's Gate Brewery (Dublin) Tramways Act 1878	41 & 42 Vict. c. xxix	16 April 1878
An Act to authorise Edward Cecil Guinness to construct certain Tramways in the City of Dublin; and for other purposes.
Manchester, Sheffield, and Lincolnshire Railway Act 1878	41 & 42 Vict. c. xxx	16 April 1878
An Act for authorising the Manchester, Sheffield, and Lincolnshire Railway Company to make a new Branch Railway and other works; for conferring upon them additional powers; and for other purposes.
West Lancashire Railway (Steam Vessels) Act 1878	41 & 42 Vict. c. xxxi	16 April 1878
An Act for empowering the West Lancashire Railway Company to provide and use Steam and other Vessels; and for other purposes.).
Wiggenhall Saint Mary Magdalen Drainage Act 1878	41 & 42 Vict. c. xxxii	16 April 1878
An Act to confer further powers on the Commissioners acting in the execution of An Act for draining and preserving certain fen lands and low grounds in the parish of Wiggenhall Saint Mary Magdalen, in the county of Norfolk; and other purposes.
Cannock Chase Railway (Extension) Amendment Act 1878	41 & 42 Vict. c. xxxiii	16 April 1878
An Act to provide for the cancelling of bond entered into under the Cannock Chase Railway (Extension) Act, 1862. (Note: Cannock Chase Railway (Extension) Act 1862 (25 & 26 Vict. c. cxciv))
Shrewsbury Gas Act 1878	41 & 42 Vict. c. xxxiv	16 April 1878
An Act to extend the powers of the Shrewsbury Gaslight Company.
Cleveland Mineral Railway Act 1878	41 & 42 Vict. c. xxxv	16 April 1878
An Act to revive and extend the powers of the Cleveland Extension Mineral Railway Company.
East Norfolk Railway Act 1878	41 & 42 Vict. c. xxxvi	16 April 1878
An Act for authorising the East Norfolk Railway Company to raise further money for their main line, for constituting their Aylsham Extension capital a separate capital, for the abandonment of their Wroxham Quay Branch and for other purposes.
Local Government Board's Provisional Orders Confirmation (Abingdon, &c.) Act 1878	41 & 42 Vict. c. xxxvii	27 May 1878
An Act to confirm certain Provisional Orders of the Local Government Board relating to the Borough of Abingdon, the Rural Sanitary District of the Abingdon Union, the Local Government Districts of Brampton and Walton, Buxton, and Dalton-in-Furness, the Rural Sanitary District of the Headington Union, the City of Lincoln, the Rural Sanitary District of the Loughborough Union, the Local Government District of Newtown and Llanllwchaiarn, the Boroughs of Saint Helens and Southport, and the City of Worcester.
	Abingdon Borough Order 1878	
	Abingdon Union Order 1878	
	Brampton and Walton Order 1878	
	Buxton Order 1878	
	Dalton-in-Furness Order 1878	
	Headington Union Order 1878	
	Lincoln Order 1878	
	Loughborough Union Order 1878	
	Newtown and Llanllwchaiarn Order 1878	
	St. Helens Order 1878	
	Southport Order 1878	
	Worcester Order 1878	
Drainage and Improvement of Lands Supplemental Act (Ireland) 1878	41 & 42 Vict. c. xxxviii	27 May 1878
An Act to confirm two Provisional Orders under the Drainage and Improvement of Lands (Ireland) Act, 1863, and the Acts amending the same, relating to Ward River and River Suck Drainage Districts.
Borrowstounness Town and Harbour (Amendment) Act 1878	41 & 42 Vict. c. xxxix	27 May 1878
An Act to amend the Borrowstounness Town and Harbour Act, 1875; (Note: Borrowstounness Town and Harbour Act 1875 (38 & 39 Vict. c. cxxxvii)) to constitute a new Harbour Commission; and for other purposes.
Yarmouth and North Norfolk (Light) Railway Act 1878	41 & 42 Vict. c. xl	27 May 1878
An Act to enable the Great Yarmouth and Stalham (Light) Railway Company to construct a new Railway and other works; and for other purposes.
Marske and Saltburn Gas Act 1878 (repealed)	41 & 42 Vict. c. xli	27 May 1878
An Act for incorporating the Marske and Saltburn Gas Company, and authorising them to supply with Gas certain parts of the Parish of Marske in the North Riding of the County of York, and to amalgamate with the Redcar and Coatham Gas Company; and for other purposes. (Repealed by Redcar Urban District Council Gas Act 1920 (10 & 11 Geo. 5. c. lx))
Birmingham Closed Burial Grounds Act 1878 (repealed)	41 & 42 Vict. c. xlii	27 May 1878
An Act to provide for the better care and management of Closed Burial Grounds in the borough of Birmingham; and for other purposes. (Repealed by Birmingham Corporation (Consolidation) Act 1883 (46 & 47 Vict. c. lxx))
York United Gaslight Company's Act 1878 (repealed)	41 & 42 Vict. c. xliii	27 May 1878
An Act for extending the district within which the York United Gaslight Company may supply gas, for empowering them to construct additional works and to raise additional capital; and for other purposes. (Repealed by York Gas (Consolidation) Act 1912 (2 & 3 Geo. 5. c. lxxi))
Truro Water (Extension of Time) Act 1878	41 & 42 Vict. c. xliv	27 May 1878
An Act to extend the time for the completion of the works authorised by the Truro Water Act, 1875. (Note: Truro Water Act 1875 (38 & 39 Vict. c. lxxxiv))
Nottingham Waterworks Act 1878 (repealed)	41 & 42 Vict. c. xlv	27 May 1878
An Act for granting further powers to the Nottingham Waterworks Company. (Repealed by Statute Law (Repeals) Act 1995 (c. 44))
Pegwell Bay Reclamation and Sandwich Haven Improvement Act 1878	41 & 42 Vict. c. xlvi	27 May 1878
An Act for extending the time limited by the Pegwell Bay Reclamation and Sandwich Haven Improvement Act, 1873, (Note: Pegwell Bay Reclamation and Sandwich Haven Improvement Act 1873 (36 & 37 Vict. c. ccxix)) and the Pegwell Bay Reclamation and Sandwich Haven Improvement (Amendment) Act, 1876, (Note: Pegwell Bay Reclamation and Sandwich Haven Improvement (Amendment) Act 1876 (39 & 40 Vict. c. xxviii)) for the purchase of land and the completion of works.
Clyde Navigation Act 1878	41 & 42 Vict. c. xlvii	27 May 1878
An Act to authorise the Trustees of the Clyde Navigation to construct Ferry Works and establish a Ferry at Stobcross, in the Harbour of Glasgow, to levy and alter rates, and to borrow money; and for other purposes.
Lewes Gas Act 1878	41 & 42 Vict. c. xlviii	27 May 1878
An Act io re-incorporate with further powers the Lewes Gaslight Company.
Lea Bridge District Gas Act 1878	41 & 42 Vict. c. xlix	27 May 1878
An Act to dissolve the Lea Bridge District Gaslight and Coke Company, Limited, and to re-incorporate the same Company with powers to supply Gas in the parish of Walthamstow and part of the parish of Leyton.
Scarborough Waterworks Amendment Act 1878	41 & 42 Vict. c. l	27 May 1878
An Act to enable the Scarborough Waterworks Company to extend their limits of supply, construct new works; and for other purposes.
Pacific Steam Navigation Company Act 1878	41 & 42 Vict. c. li	27 May 1878
An Act to enable the Pacific Steam Navigation Company to reduce their Capital and to invest Moneys; and for other purposes.
Preston Tramways Act 1878 (repealed)	41 & 42 Vict. c. lii	27 May 1878
An Act to incorporate the Preston Tramways Company, and to authorise the construction of Tramways in the Borough of Preston and the adjacent Township of Fulwood, both in the County of Lancaster; and for other purposes. (Repealed by County of Lancashire Act 1984 (c. xxi))
Scottish Union and National Insurance Company's Act 1878 (repealed)	41 & 42 Vict. c. liii	27 May 1878
An Act for the amalgamation of the Scottish Union Insurance Company and the Scottish National Insurance Company, and for the incorporation of the amalgamated Companies by the name of "The Scottish Union and National Insurance Company;" and for other purposes. Be. (Repealed by Scottish Union and National Insurance Company's Act 1956 (4 & 5 Eliz. 2. c. lxv))
Hull Street Tramways Act 1878	41 & 42 Vict. c. liv	27 May 1878
An Act to authorise the Hull Street Tramways Company to raise additional Capital to increase the number of Directors of the Company; and for other purposes.
Manchester Division and Borough of Salford (Stipendiary Justices) Act 1878 (repealed)	41 & 42 Vict. c. lv	17 June 1878
An Act to provide for the appointment and remuneration of separate Stipendiary Justices for the division of Manchester, in the county of Lancaster, and for the borough of Salford, in the same county; and for other purposes. (Repealed by Justices of the Peace Act 1968 (c. 69))
Gas and Water Orders Confirmation Act 1878	41 & 42 Vict. c. lvi	17 June 1878
An Act to confirm certain Provisional Orders made by the Board of Trade under the Gas and Water Works Facilities Act, 1870, (Note: Gas and Water Works Facilities Act 1870 (33 & 34 Vict. c. 70)) relating to Bognor Gas, Dysynni Gas, Elland Gas, Formby Gas, Godalming Gas, Greenhithe Gas, Sandown Gas, Shanklin Gas, Weston-super-Mare Gas, Alcester Water, Cuckfield, Haywards-Heath, and Lindfield Water, Fowey Water, Frith Hill, Godalming, and Farncombe Water, Holywell and District Water, Newquay Water, Norwood (Middlesex) Water, Wokingham Water, Hoylake and West Kirby Gas and Water, New Tredegar Gas and Water, and Walton-on-the-Naze Gas and Water.
	Bognor Gas Order 1878	
	Dysynni Gas Order 1878	
	Elland Gas Order 1878	
	Formby Gas Order 1878	
	Godalming Gas Order 1878	
	Greenhithe Gas Order 1878	
	Sandown Gas Order 1878	
	Shanklin Gas Order 1878	
	Weston-super-Mare Gaslight Order 1878	
	Alcester Water Order 1878	
	Cuckfield, Haywards-Heath and Lindfield Water Order 1878	
	Fowey Water Order 1878	
	Frith Hill, Godalming and Farncombe Water Order 1878	
	Holywell and District Water Order 1878	
	Newquay Water Order 1878	
	Norwood (Middlesex) Water Order 1878	
	Wokingham District Water Order 1878	
	Hoylake and West Kirby Gas and Water Order 1878	
	New Tredegar Gas and Water Order 1878	
	Walton-on-the-Naze Gas and Water Order 1878	
Local Government Board's (Gas) Provisional Orders Confirmation (Droitwich, &c.) Act, 1878	41 & 42 Vict. c. lvii	17 June 1878
An Act to confirm certain Provisional Orders of the Local Government Board under the Provisions of the Gas and Water Works Facilities Act, 1870, and the Public Health Act, 1875, relating to the Borough of Droitwich, the Local Government District of Ilkeston, the Borough of Saffron Walden, and the Local Government District of Tow Law.
	Droitwich Gas Order 1878	
	Ilkeston Gas Order 1878	
	Saffron Walden Gas Order 1878	
	Tow Law Gas Order 1878	
Education Department Provisional Order Confirmation (Mickleover) Act 1878	41 & 42 Vict. c. lviii	17 June 1878
An Act to confirm a Provisional Order made by the Education Department under "The Elementary Education Act, 1870," (Note: Elementary Education Act 1870 (33 & 34 Vict. c. 75)) to enable the School Board for Mickleover, in the county of Derby, to put in force "The Lands Clauses Consolidation Act, 1845," (Note: Lands Clauses Consolidation Act 1845 (8 & 9 Vict. c. 18)) and the Acts amending the same.
	Mickleover Order 1878	
Bristol Port and Channel Dock Act 1878	41 & 42 Vict. c. lix	17 June 1878
An Act for authorising the transfer to the Bristol Port and Channel Dock Company of the undertaking of the Bristol Port and Channel Dock Warehouse Company (Limited); for making further provision as to the Capital of the first-mentioned Company; and for other purposes.
Glasgow Public Parks Act 1878	41 & 42 Vict. c. lx	17 June 1878
An Act to confer powers on the Lord Provost, Magistrates, and Council of the city of Glasgow with respect to Public Parks, Museums, and Galleries in the said city; and for other purposes.
Burton-upon-Trent Improvement Act 1878	41 & 42 Vict. c. lxi	17 June 1878
An Act for extending the limits of the Town of Burton-upon-Trent Act, 1853; (Note: Town of Burton-upon-Trent Act 1853 (16 & 17 Vict. c. cxviii)) for incorporating the Commissioners under that Act; for enabling them to construct Flood Embankments, Gasworks, Cemetery, and Markets; and for other purposes.
Westhoughton Local Board Act 1878 (repealed)	41 & 42 Vict. c. lxii	17 June 1878
An Act for empowering the Local Board for the District of Westhoughton, in the county of Lancaster, to provide their district with a supply of Water; and for other purposes. (Repealed by Bolton Water Order 1958 (SI 1958/1615))
Dalton-in-Furness District Local Board Act 1878	41 & 42 Vict. c. lxiii	17 June 1878
An Act to authorise the Local Board for the District of Dalton-in-Furness to purchase so much of the Gas Undertaking of the Mayor, Aldermen, and Burgesses of the Borough of Barrow-in-Furness as relates to the supply of Gas within the District of the Board; to purchase the Dalton Gasworks; to erect Gasworks and to manufacture and supply Gas within their District; to make improvements of Streets; to define and extend the powers of the Board in relation to the improvement of the District; and for other purposes.
Forth Bridge Railway Act 1878	41 & 42 Vict. c. lxiv	17 June 1878
An Act to confer powers on the Forth Bridge Railway Company, and on the North British, the Midland, the North-eastern, and the Great Northern Railway Companies, with reference to the Forth Bridge Railways; and for other purposes.
Liverpool Improvement Act 1878 (repealed)	41 & 42 Vict. c. lxv	17 June 1878
An Act for authorising the making of a New Street in continuation of Pall Mall and Ray Street, in the borough of Liverpool; and for other purposes. (Repealed by Liverpool Corporation Act 1921 (11 & 12 Geo. 5. c. lxxiv))
South Hants Water Act 1878	41 & 42 Vict. c. lxvi	17 June 1878
An Act to extend the limits of supply of the South Hants Waterworks Company, and to enable them to raise additional Capital.
Tredegar Water and Gas Act 1878	41 & 42 Vict. c. lxvii	17 June 1878
An Act for incorporating a Company for supplying with Water and Gas parts of the parishes of Bedwellty, in the county of Monmouth, and Llangunnyder, otherwise Llangynnider, in the county of Brecon, and for other purposes.
Conway Bridge Act 1878 (repealed)	41 & 42 Vict. c. lxviii	17 June 1878
An Act to vest Conway Bridge in Commissioners, to provide for the Maintenance and Repair thereof, the Reduction of the Tolls, and for other purposes. (Repealed by Conway Corporation Act 1965 (c. xxxv))
Govan Burgh Act 1878	41 & 42 Vict. c. lxix	17 June 1878
An Act to provide for the improvement and disposal of the Common Lands of Govan in the county of Lanark, and the application of the prices thereof; and for other purposes.
Alloa Harbour Act 1878	41 & 42 Vict. c. lxx	17 June 1878
An Act to authorise the Trustees of the Port and Harbour of Alloa to borrow additional Money; and for other purposes.
Newhaven Harbour Improvement Act 1878	41 & 42 Vict. c. lxxi	17 June 1878
An Act for the Enlargement and Improvement of the Harbour of Newhaven in Sussex, and for the Construction of a Dock and other Works there.
London, Brighton, and South Coast Railway (Croydon, Oxted, and East Grinstead Railways) Act 1878	41 & 42 Vict. c. lxxii	17 June 1878
An Act to enable the London, Brighton, and South Coast Railway Company to complete and construct Railways between Croydon, Oxted, and East Grinstead, and to acquire the Lewes and East Grinstead Railway; to confer powers on the South-eastern Railway Company; and for other purposes.
Cockermouth and Workington Water Act 1878	41 & 42 Vict. c. lxxiii	17 June 1878
An Act to empower the Local Boards of Health for the Districts of Cockermouth and Workington, and the Cockermouth Union Rural Sanitary Authority, in the county of Cumberland, to take water from Crummock Lake for supply within their respective Districts; and for other purposes.
London, Brighton, and South Coast Railway (Various Powers) Act 1878	41 & 42 Vict. c. lxxiv	17 June 1878
An Act to confer further powers upon the London, Brighton, and South Coast Railway Company, and to enable them to purchase the Hayling Bridge and Causeway.
Scarborough Corporation Water Act 1878	41 & 42 Vict. c. lxxv	17 June 1878
An Act for authorising the Corporation of Scarborough to purchase the Undertaking of the Scarborough Waterworks Company, and to supply with Water the Borough of Scarborough, and other places; and for other purposes.
East Grinstead Gas and Water Act 1878	41 & 42 Vict. c. lxxvi	17 June 1878
An Act for incorporating the East Grinstead Gas and Water Company; and for other purposes.
Rhondda Valley and Hirwain Junction Railway Act 1878	41 & 42 Vict. c. lxxvii	17 June 1878
An Act to authorise the Rhondda Valley and Hirwain Junction Railway Company to abandon certain of their authorised Railways; to lease so much of their Railway as has been constructed to the Taff Vale Railway Company; to reduce the capital of the Company; and to regulate their affairs.
Hemel Hempsted District Gas Act 1878	41 & 42 Vict. c. lxxviii	17 June 1878
An Act for dissolving the Hemel Hempsted and Boxmoor Gas and Coke Company (Limited) and the Boxmoor, Two Waters, and Crouchfield Gas and Coke Company (Limited), and incorporating the shareholders of those Companies into a company for supplying gas to Hemel Hempsted and certain neighbouring places in the county of Hertford; and for other purposes.
Glasgow Municipal Buildings Act 1878	41 & 42 Vict. c. lxxix	17 June 1878
An Act to provide for the erection of Municipal Buildings in the city of Glasgow; and for other purposes.
Bedlingtonshire Local Board (Water) Act 1878	41 & 42 Vict. c. lxxx	17 June 1878
An Act to enable the Local Board for the district of Bedlingtonshire in the county of Northumberland to acquire water rights for the purposes of their water undertaking.
South Staffordshire Mines Drainage Act 1878	41 & 42 Vict. c. lxxxi	17 June 1878
An Act to vary and amend the provisions of the South Staffordshire Mines Drainage Act, 1873. (Note: South Staffordshire Mines Drainage Act 1873 (36 & 37 Vict. c. cl))
Blackpool Pier Act 1878	41 & 42 Vict. c. lxxxii	17 June 1878
An Act to sanction certain proceedings of the Blackpool Pier Company (Limited) with reference to the construction of 9 works, and to dissolve and re-incorporate and confer further powers on the Company; and for other purposes.
Llanelly Harbour Act 1878	41 & 42 Vict. c. lxxxiii	17 June 1878
An Act to alter the Constitution of the Llanelly Harbour and Burry Navigation Commissioners; to enable them, with the consent of the Local Board for the District of the Borough of Llanelly, to raise Moneys; to amend the Law relating to the said Local Board; and for other purposes.
Clitheroe Corporation Act 1878	41 & 42 Vict. c. lxxxiv	17 June 1878
An Act for enabling the Mayor, Aldermen, and Burgesses of the Borough of Clitheroe, in the county of Lancaster, to acquire the Undertakings of the Clitheroe Gas Company and the Clitheroe Waterworks Company; to construct additional Waterworks; to erect a Market; to widen and improve the Streets of the said Borough; and for other purposes.
Nettlebridge Valley Railway (Abandonment) Act 1878 (repealed)	41 & 42 Vict. c. lxxxv	17 June 1878
An Act for the abandonment of the Railways authorised by the Nettlebridge Valley Railway Act, 1874; (Note: Nettlebridge Valley Railway Act 1874 (37 & 38 Vict. c. clxxi)) and for other purposes. (Repealed by Statute Law (Repeals) Act 2013 (c. 2))
Tees Conservancy Act 1878	41 & 42 Vict. c. lxxxvi	17 June 1878
An Act for conferring on the Tees Conservancy Commissioners further powers in relation to the borrowing of money and the levying of tolls, rates, and dues; and for other purposes.
Market Deeping Railway Act 1878 (repealed)	41 & 42 Vict. c. lxxxvii	17 June 1878
An Act for making a Railway from the Great Northern Railway to Market Deeping; and for other purposes. (Repealed by Market Deeping Railway (Abandonment) Act 1883 (46 & 47 Vict. c. clxx))
Sleaford Navigation (Abandonment) Act 1878	41 & 42 Vict. c. lxxxviii	17 June 1878
An Act to provide for the closing of the undertaking of the Company of Proprietors of the Navigation from Sleaford Castle Causeway to the River Witham in the county of Lincoln, and for the dissolution of the Company; and for other purposes.
Rhins of Galloway Railway Act 1878 (repealed)	41 & 42 Vict. c. lxxxix	17 June 1878
An Act for making a Railway from Stranraer to New England Bay, in the county of Wigtown; and for other purposes. (Repealed by Rhins of Galloway Railway (Abandonment) Act 1883 (46 & 47 Vict. c. iii))
Great Eastern Railway (Northern Extension) Act 1878	41 & 42 Vict. c. xc	17 June 1878
An Act to authorise the Great Eastern Railway Company to raise capital for carrying into effect an arrangement with the Great Northern Railway Company with respect to an extension of their system to the railways of several other companies in Lincolnshire and Yorkshire; and for other purposes.
Nottingham Improvement Act 1878	41 & 42 Vict. c. xci	17 June 1878
An Act for enabling the Mayor, Aldermen, and Burgesses of the borough of Nottingham to construct additional Gasworks; to make a New Road; and for other purposes.
Southport Waterworks Act 1878	41 & 42 Vict. c. xcii	17 June 1878
An Act to empower the Southport Waterworks Company to construct additional Works, to extend their Limits of Supply, to raise additional Capital, to amend and enlarge the provisions of the Southport Waterworks Act, 1854, (Note: Southport Waterworks Act 1854 (17 & 18 Vict. c. xvi)) the Southport Waterworks Act, 1856, (Note: Southport Waterworks Act 1856 (19 & 20 Vict. c. viii)) the Southport Waterworks Act, 1867, (Note: Southport Waterworks Act 1867 (30 & 31 Vict. c. cx)) and the Southport Waterworks Act, 1870; (Note: Southport Waterworks Act 1870 (33 & 34 Vict. c. xxiii)) and for other purposes.
Merrybent and Darlington Railway Company (Winding Up) Act 1878	41 & 42 Vict. c. xciii	17 June 1878
An Act to provide for the winding up of the Merrybent and Darlington Railway.
Dundee Street Tramways, Turnpike Roads, and Police Act 1878 (repealed)	41 & 42 Vict. c. xciv	17 June 1878
An Act to authorise the construction of Tramways in the Burgh of Dundee, and for the transference of the Turnpike Roads within the Burgh to the Police Commissioners, and the abolition of Tolls; and for other purposes. (Repealed by Dundee Corporation (Consolidated Powers) Order Confirmation Act 1957 (6 & 7 Eliz. 2. c. iv))
London and North-western and Furness Railway Companies (Whitehaven, Cleator, and Egremont Railway Vesting) Act 1878	41 & 42 Vict. c. xcv	17 June 1878
An Act for vesting in the Furness Railway Company jointly with the London and North-western Railway Company the Whitehaven, Cleator, and Egremont Railway; and for other purposes.
Midland Railway (Additional Powers) Act 1878	41 & 42 Vict. c. xcvi	17 June 1878
An Act for conferring additional powers on the Midland Railway Company for the construction of railways and other works, the acquisition of lands, and the raising of capital, and for vesting in them the undertaking of the Stonehouse and Nailsworth Railway Company; for conferring powers on the Sheffield and Midland Railway Companies Committee for the acquisition of a private railway and additional lands; and for other purposes.
Wigan Junction Railways Act 1878	41 & 42 Vict. c. xcvii	17 June 1878
An Act to confer further powers upon the Wigan Junction Railways Company; to authorise the Manchester, Sheffield, and Lincolnshire Railway Company to subscribe to the undertaking of and to enter into arrangements with the Wigan Junction Railways Company; and for other purposes.
Great Northern Railway (Spalding to Lincoln) Act 1878	41 & 42 Vict. c. xcviii	17 June 1878
An Act to enable the Great Northern Railway Company to extend their Railway from Spalding to Lincoln; and for other purposes.
Staines and West Drayton Railway Act 1878	41 & 42 Vict. c. xcix	17 June 1878
An Act to revive the powers and extend the periods for the compulsory purchase of Lands and for the Construction of the Railway authorised by the Staines and West Drayton Railway Act, 1873. (Note: Staines and West Drayton Railway Act 1873 (36 & 37 Vict. c. cxxviii))
Glasgow Municipal Act 1878	41 & 42 Vict. c. c	17 June 1878
An Act to extend the Municipal Boundaries of the City of Glasgow; and for other purposes.
London and North-western Railway (Wortley to Leeds, &c.) Act 1878	41 & 42 Vict. c. ci	17 June 1878
An Act for empowering the London and North-western Railway Company to construct a new Railway, and to widen a portion of an existing Railway, in the West Riding of the county of York; and for other purposes.
Fraserburgh Harbour Act 1878 (repealed)	41 & 42 Vict. c. cii	17 June 1878
An Act for improving and maintaining the Harbour of Fraserburgh. (Repealed by Fraserburgh Harbour Order Confirmation Act 1985 (c. xlv))
General Police and Improvement (Scotland) Act 1862 Order Confirmation (Paisley) Act 1878	41 & 42 Vict. c. ciii	4 July 1878
An Act to confirm a Provisional Order under the General Police and Improvement (Scotland) Act; 1862, relating to the Burgh of Paisley.
	Paisley Order 1878	
Local Government Board's (Poor Law) Provisional Orders Confirmation (Birmingham, &c.) Act 1878 (repealed)	41 & 42 Vict. c. civ	4 July 1878
An Act to confirm certain Provisional Orders of the Local, Government Board under the provisions of the Poor Law Amendment Act, 1867, (Note: Poor Law Amendment Act 1867 (30 & 31 Vict. c. 106)) relating to the Parishes of Birmingham and Boldre, and to the Townships of Old Accrington and New Accrington, and certain Orders of the Local Government Board under the provisions of the Divided Parishes and Poor Law Amendment Act, 1876, relating to the Parishes of Bolnhurst, Keysoe, Little Staughton, Minster, Pertenhall, and Saint Lawrence. (Repealed by Statute Law (Repeals) Act 2013 (c. 2))
	Birmingham Order 1878	
	Boldre Order 1878	
	Old Accrington and New Accrington Order 1878	
	Keysoe and Pertenhall Order 1878	
	Bolnhurst and Pertenhall Order 1878	
	Minster and St. Lawrence Order 1878	
	Little Staughton and Pertenhall Order 1878	
Local Government Board's Provisional Orders Confirmation (Artizans and Labourers Dwellings) Act 1878	41 & 42 Vict. c. cv	4 July 1878
An Act to confirm certain Provisional Orders of the Local, Government Board under the provisions of the Artizans and Labourers Dwellings Improvement Act, 1875, relating to the Boroughs of Devonport and Newcastle-upon-Tyne.
	Devonport Order 1878	
	Newcastle-upon-Tyne Order 1878	
Public Health (Scotland) Act 1867 Order Confirmation (Lochgelly) Act 1878	41 & 42 Vict. c. cvi	4 July 1878
An Act to confirm a Provisional Order under the Public Health (Scotland) Act, 1867, (Note: Public Health (Scotland) Act 1867 (30 & 31 Vict. c. 101)) relating to the burgh of Lochgelly, in the county of Fife.
	Lochgelly Order 1878	
Education Department Provisional Order Confirmation (Portsmouth) Act, 1878	41 & 42 Vict. c. cvii	4 July 1878
An Act to confirm a Provisional Order made by the Education Department under the Elementary Education Act, 1870, to enable the School Board for Portsmouth to put in force the Lands Clauses Consolidation Act, 1845, and the Acts amending the same.
	Portsmouth Order 1878	
Local Government Board (Ireland) Provisional Order Confirmation (Artizans and Labourers Dwellings) Act 1878	41 & 42 Vict. c. cviii	4 July 1878
An Act to confirm a Provisional Order of the Local Government Board for Ireland under the provisions of the Artizans and Labourers Dwellings Improvement Act, 1875, relating to the Borough of Cork.
	Cork Order 1878	
Local Government Board's Provisional Orders Confirmation (Belper Union, &c.) Act 1878	41 & 42 Vict. c. cix	4 July 1878
An Act to confirm certain Provisional Orders of the Local Government Board relating to the Rural Sanitary District of the Belper Union, the Borough of Burnley, the Rural Sanitary District of the Chesterfield Union (two), the Local Government District of Ilkeston, the Improvement Act District of Lytham, the Port of Milford, the Local Government District of Rhymney, the Rural Sanitary District of the Rugby Union, the Local Government District of Ryton, the Rural Sanitary District of the Saint Asaph Union, the Port of Sunderland, the Borough of Swansea, and the Local Government District of Tunbridge Wells.
	Belper Union Order 1878	
	Burnley Order 1878	
	Chesterfield Union Order (1) 1878	
	Chesterfield Union Order (2) 1878	
	Ilkeston Order 1878	
	Lytham Order 1878	
	Milford Order 1878	
	Rhymney Order 1878	
	Rugby Union Order 1878	
	Ryton Order 1878	
	St. Asaph Union Order 1878	
	Sunderland Order 1878	
	Swansea Order 1878	
	Tunbridge Wells Order 1878	
Education Department Provisional Orders Confirmation (Birmingham, &c.) Act 1878	41 & 42 Vict. c. cx	4 July 1878
An Act to confirm certain Provisional Orders made by the Education Department under the Elementary Education Act, 1870, to enable the School Boards for Birmingham, Lewannick (Cornwall), and Mold (Flint) to put in force the Lands Clauses Consolidation Act, 1845, and the Acts amending the same.
	Birmingham Order 1878	
	Lewannick Order 1878	
	Mold Order 1878	
Education Department Provisional Order Confirmation (London) Act 1878	41 & 42 Vict. c. cxi	4 July 1878
An Act to confirm a Provisional Order made by the Education Department under the Elementary Education Act, 1870, to enable the School Board for London to put in force the Lands Clauses Consolidation Act, 1845, and the Acts amending the same.
	London Order 1878	
Metropolis (Bowman's Buildings, Marylebone, and Essex Road, Islington) Improvement Provisional Orders Confirmation Act, 1878	41 & 42 Vict. c. cxii	4 July 1878
An Act to confirm certain Provisional Orders of one of Her Majesty's Principal Secretaries of State for the Improvement of certain Unhealthy Areas within the Metropolis.
	Bowman's Buildings, Marylebone Order 1878	
	Essex Road, Islington Order 1878	
Inclosure (Orford) Provisional Order Confirmation Act 1878	41 & 42 Vict. c. cxiii	4 July 1878
An Act to confirm the Provisional Order for the inclosure of certain Lands situated in the parish of Orford, in the county of Suffolk, in pursuance of a report of the Inclosure Commissioners for England and Wales.
	Orford Order 1878	
Pier and Harbour Orders Confirmation Act 1878 (No. 1)	41 & 42 Vict. c. cxiv	4 July 1878
An Act to confirm certain Provisional Orders made by the Board of Trade under the General Pier and Harbour Act, 1861, (Note: General Pier and Harbour Act 1861 (24 & 25 Vict. c. 45)) relating to Auchenlochan (Kyles of Bute), Carrick Castle (Loch Goil), Conway, Falmouth, Filey, Folkestone, Hythe (Southampton), Margate, Plymouth, Port Seton, Sea View (Isle of Wight), Shanklin, Southend, South Uist, and Walton-on-the-Naze.
	Auchenlochan (Kyles of Bute) Pier Order 1878	
	Carrick Castle (Loch Goil) Pier Order 1878	
	Conway Harbour Order 1878	
	Falmouth Piers Order 1878	
	Filey Pier and Harbour Order 1878	
	Folkestone Pier and Lift Order 1878	
	Hythe (Southampton) Pier Order 1878	
	Margate Pier and Harbour Order 1878	
	Plymouth Pier Order 1878	
	Port Seton Harbour Order 1878	
	Seaview Pier Order 1878	
	Shanklin Pier Order 1878	
	Southend Piers Order 1878	
	South Uist (Loch Boisdale and Loch Skiport) Piers Order 1878	
	Walton-on-the-Naze Pier Order 1878	
Pier and Harbour Orders Confirmation Act 1878 (No. 2)	41 & 42 Vict. c. cxv	4 July 1878
An Act to confirm certain Provisional Orders made by the Board of Trade under the General Pier and Harbour Act, 1861, relating to Ardglass, Boddam, Lochmaddy, Montrose, Southsea, and Youghal.
	Ardglass Dock Order 1878	
	Boddam Harbour Order 1878	
	Lochmaddy Pier and Harbour Order 1878	
	Montrose Harbour Order 1878	
	Southsea South Parade Pier Order 1878	
	Youghal Harbour Order 1878	
Local Government Board (Ireland) Provisional Orders (Dungarvan, &c.) Confirmation Act 1878	41 & 42 Vict. c. cxvi	4 July 1878
An Act for confirming certain Provisional Orders of the Local Government Board for Ireland relating to Waterworks in the Town of Dungarvan, and to the Burial Grounds of Barnahely and Templerobin in the County of Cork, and to the Town of Tralee, and to Waterworks in the Town of Tralee.
	Dunagarvan Waterworks Provisional Order 1878	
	Barnahely, County Cork, Burial Ground Provisional Order 1878	
	Templerobin, County Cork, Burial Ground Provisional Order 1878	
	Tralee Incorporation Order 1878	
	Tralee Waterworks Provisional Order 1878	
Ballymena, Cushendall, and Redbay Railway Act 1878	41 & 42 Vict. c. cxvii	4 July 1878
An Act for empowering the Ballymena, Cushendall, and Redbay Railway Company to make certain new Railways; to acquire additional Lands; to divide their Shares; and for other purposes.
Belfast and Northern Counties Railway Act 1878	41 & 42 Vict. c. cxviii	4 July 1878
An Act to empower the Belfast and Northern Counties Railway Company to construct a Loop Line of Railway; to subscribe a further sum to the Undertaking of the Ballymena, Cushendall, and Redbay Railway; to purchase additional Lands; and for other purposes.
Bangor Local Board Act 1878	41 & 42 Vict. c. cxix	4 July 1878
An Act to authorise the Local Board of Health for the district of Bangor, in the county of Carnarvon, to acquire the undertaking of the Bangor Water and Gas Company, and to supply the parishes of Bangor, Llandegai, and Llanllechid with water, and the parishes of Bangor and Llandegai with gas; and for other purposes.
Jarrow Improvement Act 1878 (repealed)	41 & 42 Vict. c. cxx	4 July 1878
An Act to extend the powers of the Corporation of the Borough of Jarrow, in the County of Durham, with respect to the Local Government and Improvement of the Borough; and for other purposes. (Repealed by Tyne and Wear Act 1980 (c. xliii))
Glasgow Juvenile Delinquency Prevention and Repression Act 1878 (repealed)	41 & 42 Vict. c. cxxi	4 July 1878
An Act for preventing and repressing Juvenile Delinquency in the city of Glasgow. (Repealed by Glasgow Education Authority (Juvenile Delinquency) Order Confirmation Act 1926 (16 & 17 Geo. 5. c. xxxvii))
Newry Commissioners Gas Act 1878	41 & 42 Vict. c. cxxii	4 July 1878
An Act to transfer to the Town Commissioners of Newry the undertaking of the Newry Gas Consumers Company, Limited.
Southern Railway Act 1878 (repealed)	41 & 42 Vict. c. cxxiii	4 July 1878
An Act to amend the Acts relating to the Southern Railway Company with respect to the raising of Capital and the time for the completion of the authorised Railways and Works of the Company. (Repealed by Statute Law (Repeals) Act 2013 (c. 2))
Waterford and Central Ireland Railway Act 1878	41 & 42 Vict. c. cxxiv	4 July 1878
An Act to confer further powers on the Waterford and Central Ireland Railway Company with respect to their separate and original undertakings; and for other purposes.
Cardiff (River Side) Road and Bridge Act 1878	41 & 42 Vict. c. cxxv	4 July 1878
An Act authorising the construction of a Bridge over the River Taff at Cardiff, and of certain approach and other roads in connexion therewith; the levying of tolls; and for other purposes.
South-western Railway Act 1878	41 & 42 Vict. c. cxxvi	4 July 1878
An Act for authorising the sale or lease to the London and South-western Railway Company of the Undertaking of the Staines, Wokingham, and Woking Railway Company, or the amalgamation of the two Undertakings; to make further provision with respect to the sale or transfer of the Salisbury and Yeovil Railway to the London and South-western Railway Company; and for other purposes.
Corporation of London (Open Spaces) Act 1878	41 & 42 Vict. c. cxxvii	4 July 1878
An Act to enable the Corporation of London to acquire and hold and manage as open spaces Lands in the neighbourhood of London; and for other purposes.
Bradford Tramways Act 1878 (repealed)	41 & 42 Vict. c. cxxviii	4 July 1878
An Act for making provisions as to the application of the money deposited in respect of the application to Parliament for the Bradford Tramways Act, 1873, (Note: Bradford Tramways Act 1873 (36 & 37 Vict. c. ccliii)) and for relieving the Bradford Tramways Company from liability in respect of the non-construction of their authorised Tramways. (Repealed by West Yorkshire Act 1980 (c. xiv))
Cleator and Workington Junction Railway Extension Act 1878	41 & 42 Vict. c. cxxix	4 July 1878
An Act to authorise the Cleator and Workington Junction Railway Company to extend their authorised Railway to the Rowrah and Kelton Fell Mineral Railway; and for other purposes.
Manchester South Junction and Altrincham Railway Act 1878	41 & 42 Vict. c. cxxx	4 July 1878
An Act to empower the Manchester South Junction and Altrincham Railway Company to widen and improve a portion of their Railway, and to acquire lands for the purposes thereof, and to raise additional Capital, and to empower the London and North-western and the Manchester, Sheffield, and Lincolnshire Railway Companies to contribute such capital; and for other purposes.
Stoke-upon-Trent and Fenton Gas Act 1878 (repealed)	41 & 42 Vict. c. cxxxi	4 July 1878
An Act for empowering the Mayor, Aldermen, and Burgesses of the borough of Stoke-upon-Trent, in the county of Stafford, and the Local Board of Fenton, in the same county, to make and supply Gas; and for carrying into effect an Agreement with the Stoke, Fenton, and Longton Gas Company for the purchase of that Company's undertaking; and for other purposes. (Repealed by Stoke-on-Trent (Gas Consolidation) Act 1922 (12 & 13 Geo. 5. c. xxii))
Leicester Corporation Gas and Water Transfer Act 1878	41 & 42 Vict. c. cxxxii	4 July 1878
An Act to vest in the Mayor, Aldermen, and Burgesses of the borough of Leicester the Undertakings of the Leicester Gas Company and the Leicester Waterworks Company; and for other purposes.
Bradford Water and Improvement Act 1878	41 & 42 Vict. c. cxxxiii	4 July 1878
An Act to enable the Mayor, Aldermen, and Burgesses of the borough of Bradford, in the west riding of the county of York, to construct and maintain additional works for the storage and supply of Water; to enlarge the time for completing waterworks already authorised; to construct and maintain additional works for the storage and supply of Gas; to effect public improvements; and for other purposes.
Grand Junction Waterworks Act 1878	41 & 42 Vict. c. cxxxiv	4 July 1878
An Act to enable the Grand Junction Waterworks Company to raise further moneys, and to amend in certain respects the Acts relating to that Company.
Lichfield Gas Act 1878	41 & 42 Vict. c. cxxxv	4 July 1878
An Act for incorporating and conferring Powers on the Lichfield Gas Company.
Trowbridge Water Act 1878	41 & 42 Vict. c. cxxxvi	4 July 1878
An Act for extending the limits of supply of the Trowbridge Water Company, and for authorising the Company to construct further works, and to raise further money; and for other purposes.
Hamilton Burgh Act 1878	41 & 42 Vict. c. cxxxvii	4 July 1878
An Act for extending the Municipal and Police Boundaries of the burgh of Hamilton in the county of Lanark; for authorising the making of new streets, the improvement of existing streets, and the construction of additional water- works; for providing for the improvement and good government of the burgh; for regulating the supply of gas and water thereto; and for other purposes.
Great Southern and Western Railway Act 1878	41 & 42 Vict. c. cxxxviii	4 July 1878
An Act for enabling the Great Southern and Western Railway Company to construct a new or substituted Railway at Cork; to acquire additional Lands for the purposes of their undertaking; to raise and widen certain of their Bridges; to reduce the number of Directors; and for other purposes.
Limavady and Dungiven Railway Act 1878	41 & 42 Vict. c. cxxxix	4 July 1878
An Act for making a railway between the town of Limavady, in the county of Londonderry, and the town of Dungiven, in the same county; and for other purposes.
North British Railway Act 1878	41 & 42 Vict. c. cxl	4 July 1878
An Act to authorise the North British Railway Company to make several railways in the counties of Forfar and Lanark, to widen parts of their Glasgow and Coatbridge and Peebles Railways, to acquire additional lands for station purposes, to advance money for the purposes of the Borrowstounness Town and Harbour Act, 1875; to make further provision with respect to the Consolidation of Lien Stocks; and for other purposes.
Manchester Suburban Tramways Act 1878	41 & 42 Vict. c. cxli	4 July 1878
An Act for incorporating the Manchester Suburban Tramways Company, and for empowering them to construct Tramways in the neighbourhood of Manchester;; and for other purposes.
Taff Vale Railway Act 1878	41 & 42 Vict. c. cxlii	4 July 1878
An Act for the abandonment of one of the Railways authorised by the Taff Vale Railway Act, 1873, (Note: Taff Vale Railway Act 1873 (36 & 37 Vict. c. clviii)) and for the extension of time for the completion of certain other of the railways thereby authorised.
Ramsey and Somersham Junction Railway Act 1878	41 & 42 Vict. c. cxliii	4 July 1878
An Act to extend the time limited for the compulsory purchase of lands and completion of the Railway and Works authorised by the Ramsey and Somersham Junction Railway Act, 1875; (Note: Ramsey and Somersham Junction Railway Act 1875 (38 & 39 Vict. c. ccxii)) and for other purposes.
Cardiff Waterworks Act 1878 (repealed)	41 & 42 Vict. c. cxliv	4 July 1878
An Act for empowering the Cardiff Waterworks Company to construct additional Works, and to raise additional Capital; and for other purposes. (Repealed by South Glamorgan Act 1976 (c. xxxv))
Plumstead Common Act 1878	41 & 42 Vict. c. cxlv	4 July 1878
An Act for effecting a transfer to the Metropolitan Board of Works of the open spaces known as Plumstead Common and Shoulder-of-Mutton Green, and for enabling them to preserve, improve, and regulate the same, and to erect a lodge upon Blackheath.
Neath Harbour Act 1878	41 & 42 Vict. c. cxlvi	4 July 1878
An Act to enable the Neath Harbour Commissioners to raise further Capital, to authorise and confirm Agreements between them and the Corporation of Neath, and the Great Western, the South Wales Mineral, and the Neath and Brecon Railway Companies; and for other purposes.
Swansea Improvements and Tramways Act 1878 (repealed)	41 & 42 Vict. c. cxlvii	4 July 1878
An Act to amend the Swansea Improvements and Tramways Act, 1874, (Note: Swansea Improvements and Tramways Act 1874 (37 & 38 Vict. c. cxxxviii)) and to confer further powers upon the Swansea Improvements and Tramways Company; and for other purposes. (Repealed by Swansea and District Transport Act 1936 (26 Geo. 5 & 1 Edw. 8. c. xxxix))
Clare Slob Land Reclamation Amendment Act 1878	41 & 42 Vict. c. cxlviii	4 July 1878
An Act to revive and extend the powers of the Clare Slob Land Reclamation Company; and for other purposes.
Dublin Tramways Act 1878	41 & 42 Vict. c. cxlix	4 July 1878
An Act to empower the Dublin Tramways Company to construct further new Tramways; and for other purposes.
Glasgow, Yoker, and Clydebank Railway Act 1878	41 & 42 Vict. c. cl	4 July 1878
An Act for making a Railway from the Stobcross Railway to Yoker and Clydebank, with branches therefrom; and for other purposes.
Great Northern Railway (Further Powers) Act 1878	41 & 42 Vict. c. cli	4 July 1878
An Act to confer further Powers on the Great Northern Railway Company.
Dudley and Oldbury Junction Railway Act 1878	41 & 42 Vict. c. clii	4 July 1878
An Act to confer further Powers on the Dudley and Oldbury Junction Railway Company.
Maryport Improvement Act 1878	41 & 42 Vict. c. cliii	4 July 1878
An Act to amend the Maryport Improvement and Harbour Act, 1866, (Note: Maryport Improvement and Harbour Act 1866 (29 & 30 Vict. c. ccxlv)) the Maryport District and Harbour Act, 1868, (Note: Maryport District and Harbour Act 1868 (31 & 32 Vict. c. lxx)) the Maryport District and Harbour (Gas) Act, 1877, (Note: Maryport District and Harbour (Gas) Act 1877 (40 & 41 Vict. c. xxxviii)) to empower the Trustees to establish and maintain Markets; and for other purposes.
Metropolitan District Railway Act 1878	41 & 42 Vict. c. cliv	4 July 1878
An Act to enable the Metropolitan District Railway Company to extend their Railway to the Thames at Fulham; and for other purposes connected with the said Company.
Great Eastern Railway (General Powers) Act 1878	41 & 42 Vict. c. clv	4 July 1878
An Act for authorising the Great Eastern Railway Company to execute additional Works and to enter into various Agreements, and for conferring on them further Powers in relation to their Undertaking and Capital and the Undertakings of other Companies and parties; for amending their Acts in various particulars; and for other purposes.
Bradford Canal Transfer Act 1878	41 & 42 Vict. c. clvi	4 July 1878
An Act to authorise the transfer of the Canal Property of the Bradford Canal Company, Limited, to the Company of Proprietors of the Canal Navigation from Leeds to Liverpool, and the Undertakers of the Aire and Calder Navigation; and for other purposes.
Drumcondra, Clonliffe, and Glasnevin Township Act 1878	41 & 42 Vict. c. clvii	4 July 1878
An Act for the formation and improvement of Drumcondra, Clonliffe, and Glasnevin township, comprising the districts of Drumcondra, Clonliffe, and Glasnevin, in the barony of Coolock and county of Dublin; and for other purposes.
Dublin Central Tramways Act 1878	41 & 42 Vict. c. clviii	4 July 1878
An Act to authorise the construction of Tramways in and near the city of Dublin; and for other purposes.
Dublin Southern District Tramways Act 1878	41 & 42 Vict. c. clix	4 July 1878
An Act to authorise the construction of Tramways in and near the city of Dublin, and in the county of Dublin; and for other purposes.
Limerick Corporation Gas Act 1878	41 & 42 Vict. c. clx	4 July 1878
An Act to give effect to the purchase by the Corporation of Limerick of the undertaking of the Limerick Gas Company; to enable the Corporation to borrow money and to levy rates; and for other purposes.
Normanton Gas Act 1878	41 & 42 Vict. c. clxi	4 July 1878
An Act for incorporating and conferring Powers on the Normanton Gas Company.
Local Government Board's Provisional Orders Confirmation (Bournemouth, &c.) Act 1878	41 & 42 Vict. c. clxii	22 July 1878
An Act to confirm certain Provisional Orders of the Local Government Board relating to the Improvement Act District of Bournemouth, the Local Government District of Brotton, the Boroughs of Haverfordwest (two) and Liverpool, the Improvement Act District of Llandudno, the Local Government District of Lofthouse, the Lower Thames Valley Main Sewerage District, the Improvement Act District of Middleton and Tonge, the Local Government Districts of Pemberton, Romford, and Tyldesley-with-Shakerley (two), the Borough of Wakefield, the Improvement Act District of West Hartlepool, the Borough of Wigan, and the Local Government Districts of Wilmslow and Workington.
	Bournemouth Order 1878	
	Brotton Order 1878	
	Haverfordwest Order (1) 1878	
	Haverfordwest Order (2) 1878	
	Llandudno Order 1878	
	Lofthouse Order 1878	
	Lower Thames Valley Order 1878	
	Middleton and Tonge Order 1878	
	Pemberton Order 1878	
	Romford Order 1878	
	Tyldesley-with-Shakerley Order (1) 1878	
	Tyldesley-with-Shakerley Order (2) 1878	
	Wakefield Order 1878	
	West Hartlepool Order 1878	
	Wigan Order 1878	
	Wilmslow Order 1878	
	Workington Order 1878	
Tramways Orders Confirmation Act 1878 (No. 2)	41 & 42 Vict. c. clxiii	22 July 1878
An Act to confirm certain Provisional Orders made by the Board of Trade under the Tramways Act, 1870, (Note: Tramways Act 1870 (33 & 34 Vict. c. 78)) relating to Cardiff Tramways (Extensions), Manchester Corporation Tramways, Manchester Suburban Tramways, and Oldham Borough Tramways.
	Cardiff Tramways (Extensions) Order 1878	
	Manchester Corporation Tramways Order 1878	
	Oldham Borough Tramways Order 1878	
Local Government Board's Provisional Orders Confirmation (Abergavenny Union, &c.) Act 1878	41 & 42 Vict. c. clxiv	22 July 1878
An Act to confirm certain Provisional Orders of the Local Government Board relating to the Rural Sanitary District of the Abergavenny Union, the Improvement Act District of Bradford (Wilts), the Local Government District of Brigg, the Boroughs of Brighton and Cheltenham, the Local Government District of Ebbw Vale, the Improvement Act District of Leek, the Boroughs of Liverpool and Preston, the Local Government District of St. Columb, the Borough of Tiverton (two), the Local Government District of Tredegar, and the Special Drainage District of Washington.
	Abergavenny Union Order 1878	
	Bradford Order 1878	
	Brigg Order 1878	
	Brighton Order 1878	
	Cheltenham Order 1878	
	Ebbw Vale Order 1878	
	Leek Order 1878	
	Liverpool Order 1878	
	Preston Order 1878	
	St. Columb Order 1878	
	Tiverton Order (1) 1878	
	Tiverton Order (2) 1878	
	Tredegar Order 1878	
	Washington Order 1878	
Local Government Board's Provisional Orders Confirmation (Dawlish, &c.) Act 1878	41 & 42 Vict. c. clxv	22 July 1878
An Act to confirm certain Provisional Orders of the Local Government Board relating to the Local Government District of Dawlish, the Rural Sanitary District of the Shardlow Union, and the Borough of Wigan.
	Dawlish Order 1878	
	Shardlow Union Order 1878	
	Wigan Order 1878	
Conway Bridge Composition of Debt Act 1878 (repealed)	41 & 42 Vict. c. clxvi	22 July 1878
An Act for authorising the Commissioners of Her Majesty's Treasury to compound the Debt due to the Consolidated Fund in respect of Conway Bridge, and for other purposes relating thereto. (Repealed by Conway Corporation Act 1965 (c. xxxv))
Callander and Oban Railway Act 1878	41 & 42 Vict. c. clxvii	22 July 1878
An Act for authorising the Callander and Oban Railway Company to construct a Branch Railway to Oban Bay, with a Quay and Sea Wall and a Road there; and to make near Loch Awe a deviation of their authorised Railway; and to abandon the authorised Branch to Oban Bay and the authorised Pier there, and the portion of line for which the said deviation will be substituted; for extending the time for the completion of the main line between Dalmally and Oban; and for other purposes.
Cheadle Railway Act 1878 (repealed)	41 & 42 Vict. c. clxviii	22 July 1878
An Act for incorporating the Cheadle Railway Company, and authorising them to make and maintain the Cheadle Railway; and for other purposes. (Repealed by Cheadle Railway (Abandonment) Act 1882 (45 & 46 Vict. c. cxxi))
Radcliffe and Pilkington Gas Act 1878	41 & 42 Vict. c. clxix	22 July 1878
An Act to empower the Radcliffe and Pilkington Gas Company to acquire additional Lands, and to raise further Moneys.
Exeter Gas Act 1878	41 & 42 Vict. c. clxx	22 July 1878
An Act to empower the Exeter Gaslight and Coke Company to acquire further lands for the extension of their works, and to raise additional Capital; and for other purposes.
South Staffordshire Waterworks Act 1878	41 & 42 Vict. c. clxxi	22 July 1878
An Act to confer further powers upon the South Staffordshire Waterworks Company; and for other purposes.
Sutton-in-Ashfield Local Board Gas Act 1878 (repealed)	41 & 42 Vict. c. clxxii	22 July 1878
An Act for effecting the sale and transfer to the Local Board for Sutton-in-Ashfield, in the county of Nottingham, of the undertaking of the Sutton-in-Ashfield Gaslight and Coke Company; and for other purposes. (Repealed by Statute Law (Repeals) Act 1995 (c. 44))
Caledonian Railway (Additional Powers) Act 1878	41 & 42 Vict. c. clxxiii	22 July 1878
An Act for enabling the Caledonian Railway Company to >. 1878, make certain railways and other works and to acquire certain lands in the counties of Lanark, Renfrew, Stirling, Perth, and Forfar, to abandon certain authorised railways in Lanarkshire, and to raise additional money; for extending the periods allowed to that Company by former Acts for acquiring certain lands and completing certain works in Lanarkshire and Renfrewshire, and selling superfluous lands; and for other purposes.
Chester Tramways Act 1878 (repealed)	41 & 42 Vict. c. clxxiv	22 July 1878
An Act for incorporating the Chester Tramways Company, and for empowering them to construct Tramways in the city of Chester; and for other purposes. (Repealed by Cheshire County Council Act 1980 (c. xiii))
Great Eastern and Bury Saint Edmund's and Thetford Railway Companies Act 1878	41 & 42 Vict. c. clxxv	22 July 1878
An Act to authorise a sale of the Bury and Thetford Railway to the Great Eastern Railway Company, and agreements between that Company and certain neighbouring Companies; and for other purposes.
Lancashire and Yorkshire Railway Act 1878	41 & 42 Vict. c. clxxvi	22 July 1878
An Act for conferring further powers on the Lancashire and Yorkshire Railway Company with relation to their undertaking; and for other purposes.
Brecon Markets Amendment Act 1878	41 & 42 Vict. c. clxxvii	22 July 1878
An Act to amend the Brecon Markets Act, 1862; (Note: Brecon Markets Act 1862 (25 & 26 Vict. c. clxxxvi)) and for other purposes.
Draperstown Railway Act 1878	41 & 42 Vict. c. clxxviii	22 July 1878
An Act for making certain Railways between the town of Magherafelt, in the county of Londonderry, and Draperstown, in the same county; and for other purposes.
East Retford Borough Act 1878	41 & 42 Vict. c. clxxix	22 July 1878
An Act for extending the Boundaries of the borough of East Retford; to enable the Corporation thereof to acquire the undertaking of the Retford Gas and Coke Company; and for other purposes.
Belfast Improvement Act 1878	41 & 42 Vict. c. clxxx	22 July 1878
An Act to authorise the construction of New Streets and other Works in the borough of Belfast, and to make further provision for the improvement and government of the borough; and for other purposes.
London and North-western Railway (Additional Powers) Act 1878	41 & 42 Vict. c. clxxxi	22 July 1878
An Act for conferring further powers on the London and North-western Railway Company in relation to their own undertaking and the undertakings of other companies; for conferring on the London and North-western Railway Company and other companies further powers in relation to their joint undertakings; for making provision for the completion of a certain work authorised by the Rhyl Improvement Act, 1872; (Note: Rhyl Improvement Act 1872 (35 & 36 Vict. c. civ)) for transferring to the London and North-western Railway Company a portion of the undertaking of the Great Northern Railway Company (Ireland); for transferring to the Dundalk, Newry, and Greenore Railway Company certain of the powers of the Greencastle and Kilkeel Railway and Pier Act, 1876; (Note: Greencastle and Kilkeel Railway and Pier Act 1876 (39 & 40 Vict. c. clxiv)) and for other purposes.
London and North-western Railway (New Railways, &c.) Act 1878	41 & 42 Vict. c. clxxxii	22 July 1878
An Act for empowering the London and North-western Railway Company to make new railways, and widen portions of existing railways, and execute other works, and to acquire additional lands in the counties of Buckingham, Warwick, Chester, and Lancaster; and for other purposes.
Metropolitan Railway Act 1878	41 & 42 Vict. c. clxxxiii	22 July 1878
An Act to confer powers upon the Metropolitan Railway Company with respect to the Hammersmith and Richmond Railway; to constitute the Kingsbury and Harrow Railway a separate undertaking; to make provision for disposing of Sewage and Water from Engines; and for other purposes.
Newbury Borough Extension Act 1878 (repealed)	41 & 42 Vict. c. clxxxiv	22 July 1878
An Act for extending the boundaries of the borough of Newbury, in the county of Berks; for empowering the Corporation to acquire the undertaking of the Borough of Newbury Gaslight and Coke Company; and for other purposes. (Repealed by Berkshire Act 1986 (c. ii))
Weston-super-Mare Improvement Commissioners Water Act 1878	41 & 42 Vict. c. clxxxv	22 July 1878
An Act to authorise the Weston-super-Mare Improvement Commissioners to supply Water within the Urban Sanitary District of Weston-super-Mare and within the parishes of Uphill, Kewstoke, and Worle, in the county of Somerset; to purchase the undertaking of the Weston-super-Mare Waterworks Company; and for other purposes.
Dover and Deal Railway Act 1878	41 & 42 Vict. c. clxxxvi	22 July 1878
An Act to extend the period limited by the Dover and Deal Railway Act, 1874, (Note: Dover and Deal Railway Act 1874 (37 & 38 Vict. c. lii)) as extended by the Dover and Deal Railway Act, 1877, (Note: Dover and Deal Railway Act 1877 (40 & 41 Vict. c. ccxxxi)) for the compulsory purchase of Lands authorised to be taken by the first-mentioned Act.
Castleford and Whitwood Gas Act 1878 (repealed)	41 & 42 Vict. c. clxxxvii	22 July 1878
An Act for incorporating and conferring Powers on the Castleford and Whitwood Gaslight and Coke Company. (Repealed by West Yorkshire Act 1980 (c. xiv))
Cromwell Road Bridge Act 1878	41 & 42 Vict. c. clxxxviii	22 July 1878
An Act to authorise the construction of a Bridge over certain Railways near the western end of Cromwell Road, Kensington, with Roads and Approaches in connexion therewith.
Dublin, Wicklow, and Wexford Railway Act 1878	41 & 42 Vict. c. clxxxix	22 July 1878
An Act to enable the Dublin, Wicklow, and Wexford Railway Company to construct a railway to the city of Water- ford, and certain branch railways and other works, and to confer further powers on the Company with reference to their undertaking, and other purposes.
Exeter Corporation Water Act 1878	41 & 42 Vict. c. cxc	22 July 1878
An Act for empowering the Mayor, Aldermen, and Citizens of the city and county of the city of Exeter to acquire the undertakings of the Exeter Water Company and of the Dartmoor and Exeter Water Supply Company, Limited, and to make better provision for the supply of Water to the city and neighbouring parishes; and for other purposes.
Waterford and Limerick Railway Act 1878	41 & 42 Vict. c. cxci	22 July 1878
An Act to enable the Waterford and Limerick Railway Company to make an Extension Railway and other Works; and for other purposes.
Letterkenny Railway Act 1878	41 & 42 Vict. c. cxcii	22 July 1878
An Act to extend the time for completing the Letterkenny Railway, to revive some of the powers of purchasing land for that railway; and for other purposes.
Ramsgate Improvement Act 1878 (repealed)	41 & 42 Vict. c. cxciii	22 July 1878
An Act to extend the District of the Improvement Commissioners and the Urban Sanitary Authority for the District of Ramsgate; to enable them to make a new road; to provide for the severance of Ramsgate from the jurisdiction of the Town and Port of Sandwich; and for other purposes. (Repealed by County of Kent Act 1981 (c. xviii))
Stockton-on-Tees (Quay and Markets) Act 1878 (repealed)	41 & 42 Vict. c. cxciv	22 July 1878
An Act to authorise the Corporation of Stockton-on-Tees to construct a Quay and other Works, to borrow moneys; and for other purposes. (Repealed by Teesside Corporation Act 1971 (c. xvii))
Ballycastle Railway Act 1878	41 & 42 Vict. c. cxcv	22 July 1878
An Act to authorise the construction of a Railway in the, County of Antrim from Ballymoney to Ballycastle; and for other purposes.
Forfar Water Act 1878	41 & 42 Vict. c. cxcvi	22 July 1878
An Act for the better supplying with Water the Parliamentary Burgh of Forfar, and places adjacent; and for other purposes.
Mansfield Commissioners Gas Act 1878 (repealed)	41 & 42 Vict. c. cxcvii	22 July 1878
An Act to authorise the transfer of the Undertaking of the Mansfield Gaslight Company to the Mansfield Improvement Commissioners. (Repealed by Statute Law (Repeals) Act 1995 (c. 44))
Mersey Docks and Harbour Board (Over-Head Railways) Act 1878 (repealed)	41 & 42 Vict. c. cxcviii	22 July 1878
An Act for authorising the construction by the Mersey Docks, and Harbour Board of Over-Head or High Level Railways in connexion with their Docks on the Liverpool side of the River Mersey. (Repealed by Mersey Docks and Harbour Board (Overhead Railways) Act 1882 (45 & 46 Vict. c. cciv))
South-eastern Railway Act 1878	41 & 42 Vict. c. cxcix	22 July 1878
An Act to extend the time for the completion of certain works at Bermondsey; and for other purposes.
Enniskillen, Bundoran, and Sligo Railway Amendment Act 1878	41 & 42 Vict. c. cc	22 July 1878
An Act to provide for the cancelling of the Bond entered into under the Enniskillen, Bundoran, and Sligo Railway Act, 1862. (Note: Enniskillen, Bundoran and Sligo Railway Act 1862 (25 & 26 Vict. c. cxiv))
Navan and Kingscourt Railway Act 1878	41 & 42 Vict. c. cci	22 July 1878
An Act to confer further powers on the Navan and Kingscourt Railway Company; and for other purposes.
Bournemouth Gas and Water Act 1878	41 & 42 Vict. c. ccii	22 July 1878
An Act to confer additional powers upon the Bournemouth Gas and Water Company.
Cheltenham Corporation Water Act 1878	41 & 42 Vict. c. cciii	22 July 1878
An Act for empowering the Mayor, Aldermen, and Burgesses of the borough of Cheltenham to acquire the undertaking of the Cheltenham Waterworks Company, and for supplying with Water the borough of Cheltenham and other places; and for other purposes.
Glasgow and South-western Railway Act 1878	41 & 42 Vict. c. cciv	22 July 1878
An Act for conferring further powers on the Glasgow and South-western Railway Company for the construction of Works, the acquisition of Lands, and the raising of Money, and for making further provision for the construction of Works at the Harbour of Ayr; and for other purposes.
North-eastern Railway Company's Act 1878	41 & 42 Vict. c. ccv	22 July 1878
An Act for enabling the North-eastern Railway Company to construct a railway from their Hull and Holderness Branch to Salt End, in the East Riding of Yorkshire; and for other purposes.
Waterford, Dungarvan, and Lismore Railway (Extension) Act 1878	41 & 42 Vict. c. ccvi	22 July 1878
An Act to authorise the Waterford, Dungarvan, and Lismore Railway Company to extend their railway from their present terminus at Waterford into the city of Waterford; and for other purposes.
Great Western and South Devon Railway Companies Amalgamation Act 1878	41 & 42 Vict. c. ccvii	22 July 1878
An Act to amalgamate the Undertakings of the Great Western and South Devon Railway Companies; and for other purposes.
Great Western Railway Act 1878	41 & 42 Vict. c. ccviii	22 July 1878
An Act for empowering the Great Western Railway Company to make new Railways, Roads, and other Works; for extending the time for the completion of authorised Railways and for the purchase of lands for the same; for empowering the Great Western Railway Company to abandon the construction of certain authorised Railways; for vesting in the Great Western Railway Company and the Severn Navigation Commissioners the undertakings of the Gloucester and Worcester Horse Towing-path Company and the River Severn Horse Towing-path Extension Company; for vesting in the Great Western Railway Company and the Stratford-upon-Avon Railway Company the undertaking of the Alcester Railway Company; for conferring further powers upon the Great Western Railway Company and other Companies in relation to their respective undertakings; for empowering the Great Western Railway Company to subscribe towards the capital and debenture debt of the Worcester, Bromyard, and Leominster, the Mitcheldean Road and Forest of Dean Junction, the Malmesbury, and the Llynvi and Ogmore Railway Companies; and for other purposes.
Warrington Waterworks Act 1878	41 & 42 Vict. c. ccix	22 July 1878
An Act to amend and enlarge the provisions of the Warrington Waterworks Act, 1855, (Note: Warrington Waterworks Act 1855 (18 & 19 Vict. c. xciii)) and the Warrington Waterworks Act, 1868; (Note: Warrington Waterworks Act 1868 (31 & 32 Vict. c. lxxix)) to extend the limits of the Warrington Waterworks Company for the supply of Water; to enable the Company to construct additional works; and to make further and better provision for supplying the town and borough of Warrington and the adjoining districts with water; and for other purposes.
Littleport and Downham District Act 1878	41 & 42 Vict. c. ccx	22 July 1878
An Act to amend the Acts relating to the Littleport and Downham District, and to provide for the making and maintaining of Roads in the said District; and for other purposes.
Local Government Board's Provisional Order Confirmation (Darenth Valley) Act 1878 (repealed)	41 & 42 Vict. c. ccxi	8 August 1878
An Act to confirm a Provisional Order of the Local Government Board relating to the Darenth Valley Main Sewerage District. (Repealed by Ministry of Housing and Local Government Provisional Order Confirmation (West Kent Main Sewerage District) Act 1968 (c. xxiii))
	Darenth Valley Order 1878	
Corrib (Galway) River Act 1878	41 & 42 Vict. c. ccxii	8 August 1878
An Act for the appointment of Trustees to maintain certain works executed near the River Corrib, in the county of Galway; and for other purposes.
Epping Forest Act 1878	41 & 42 Vict. c. ccxiii	8 August 1878
An Act for the Disafforestation of Epping Forest and the preservation and management of the uninclosed parts thereof as an Open Space for the recreation and enjoyment of the public; and for other purposes.
Cork and Kinsale Junction Railway (Arrangement) Act 1878	41 & 42 Vict. c. ccxiv	8 August 1878
An Act for effecting an arrangement with respect to the Mortgage and other Debts of the Cork and Kinsale Junction Railway Company; and for other purposes.
Pontypridd, Caerphilly, and Newport Railway Act 1878	41 & 42 Vict. c. ccxv	8 August 1878
An Act for authorising the construction of Railways in the County of Glamorgan, to be called the Pontypridd, Caerphilly, and Newport Railway; and for other purposes.
Thames Conservancy Act 1878 (repealed)	41 & 42 Vict. c. ccxvi	8 August 1878
An Act for conferring on the Conservators of the River Thames further Powers, and for extending and amending the Thames Acts, 1857 to 1870; and for other purposes. (Repealed by Thames Conservancy Act 1894 (57 & 58 Vict. c. clxxxvii))
Ilen Valley Railway (Bantry Extension) Act 1878	41 & 42 Vict. c. ccxvii	8 August 1878
An Act for making a Railway from the Ilen Valley Railway, at Drimoleague, to the Town of Bantry, all in the County of Cork; and for other purposes.
Rosebush and Fishguard Railway Act 1878	41 & 42 Vict. c. ccxviii	8 August 1878
An Act for authorising the construction of a Railway from the Narberth Road and Maenclochog Railway at Rosebush to Fishguard; and for other purposes.
Teign Valley Railway Act 1878	41 & 42 Vict. c. ccxix	8 August 1878
An Act for conferring further powers on the Teign Valley Railway Company for the construction of works, and otherwise in relation to their Undertaking; and for other purposes.
Free Church of Scotland School Properties Act 1878	41 & 42 Vict. c. ccxx	8 August 1878
An Act to authorise the application to other educational purposes, or the sale or letting, of Schoolhouses and other School Properties held on behalf of Congregations of the Free Church of Scotland; and for other purposes.
Metropolitan Inner Circle Completion Railway Act 1878	41 & 42 Vict. c. ccxxi	8 August 1878
An Act to further extend the respective periods for the compulsory purchase of lands for and for the completion of the works authorised by the Metropolitan Inner Circle Completion Act, 1874. (Note: Metropolitan Inner Circle Completion Act 1874 (37 & 38 Vict. c. cxcix))
River Fergus Reclamation Act 1878	41 & 42 Vict. c. ccxxii	8 August 1878
An Act for embanking and reclaiming certain Waste Land on the bank of the River Fergus, in the county of Clare.
Banbury and Cheltenham Direct Railway Act 1878	41 & 42 Vict. c. ccxxiii	8 August 1878
An Act for conferring further powers upon the holders of certain Debenture Stock of the Banbury and Cheltenham Direct Railway Company; and for other purposes.
Croydon Tramways Act 1878	41 & 42 Vict. c. ccxxiv	8 August 1878
An Act to authorise the construction of Tramways in and near the town of Croydon, in the county of Surrey; and for other purposes.
Leominster and Bromyard Railway Act 1878	41 & 42 Vict. c. ccxxv	8 August 1878
An Act to authorise the Leominster and Bromyard Railway Company to construct a new railway, to extend the time for the purchase of certain lands and completion of line authorised by former Act; and for other purposes.
Portishead Docks Act 1878	41 & 42 Vict. c. ccxxvi	8 August 1878
An Act to extend the Time for the Completion of the Portishead Docks; and for other purposes.
Ballymena and Larne Railway Extension Act 1878	41 & 42 Vict. c. ccxxvii	8 August 1878
An Act to authorise the extension of the Ballymena and Larne Railway, in the county of Antrim; and to confer further powers in relation to that undertaking.
Newnham Bridge Act 1878	41 & 42 Vict. c. ccxxviii	8 August 1878
An Act for making a Bridge over the River Severn from Newnham to Arlingham in the county of Gloucester, with approaches thereto; and for other purposes.
Princetown Railway Act 1878	41 & 42 Vict. c. ccxxix	13 August 1878
An Act for incorporating the Princetown Railway Company; and for other purposes.
Waterford and Wexford Railway Act 1878	41 & 42 Vict. c. ccxxx	13 August 1878
An Act for amending the Acts relating to the Waterford and Wexford Railway Company.
Tramways Orders Confirmation (No. 1) Act 1878	41 & 42 Vict. c. ccxxxi	16 August 1878
An Act to confirm, with amendments, certain Provisional Orders made by the Board of Trade under the Tramways Act, 1870, relating to Aldershot and Farnborough Tramways, Bolton and Suburban Tramways, Gloucester Tramways, Moss Side Local Board Tramways, Newton Heath Local Board Tramways, Reading Tramways, Sunderland Tramways, Wavertree Local Board Tramways, West Derby Local Board Tramways, and Wolverhampton Tramways (Extension).
	Aldershot and Farnborough Tramways Order 1878	
	Bolton and Suburban Tramways Order 1878	
	Gloucester Tramways Order 1878	
	Moss Side Local Board Tramways Order 1878	
	Newton Heath Local Board Tramways Order 1878	
	Reading Tramways Order 1878	
	Sunderland Tramways Order 1878	
	Wavertree Tramways Order 1878	
	West Derby Local Board Tramways Order 1878	
	Wolverhampton Tramways (Extension) Order 1878	
Tramway Order Confirmation (No. 3) Act 1878	41 & 42 Vict. c. ccxxxii	16 August 1878
An Act to confirm, with amendments, a Provisional Order made by the Board of Trade under the Tramways Act, 1870, relating to Glasgow and Ibrox Tramway.
	Glasgow and Ibrox Tramway Order 1878	
Inclosure Provisional Orders Confirmation Act 1878	41 & 42 Vict. c. ccxxxiii	16 August 1878
An Act to confirm the Provisional Orders for the Inclosure of, certain lands in pursuance of Reports of the Inclosure Commissioners for England and Wales.
	South Luffenham Order (A) 1878	
	South Luffenham Order (B) 1878	
	North Luffenham Order (A) 1878	
	North Luffenham Order (B) 1878	
	Barrowden Order (A) 1878	
	Barrowden Order (B) 1878	
	Riccall Order (A) 1878	
	Riccall Order (B) 1878	
Aberdeen District Tramways Extension Act 1878 (repealed)	41 & 42 Vict. c. ccxxxiv	16 August 1878
An Act to authorise the Aberdeen District Tramways Company to construct additional Tramways; and for other purposes. (Repealed by Aberdeen Corporation (Water, Gas, Electricity and Transport) Order Confirmation Act 1937 (1 Edw. 8 & 1 Geo. 6. c. cii))
Belfast Street Tramways Act 1878	41 & 42 Vict. c. ccxxxv	16 August 1878
An Act to empower the Belfast Street Tramways Company to alter the gauge of their existing tramways and to construct additional tramways, and to raise further money; and for other purposes.
Boston District Tramways Act 1878	41 & 42 Vict. c. ccxxxvi	16 August 1878
An Act to incorporate the Boston District Tramways Company, and to authorise the construction of Tramways in and near the town of Boston, and from Boston to Wrangle, in the county of Lincoln; and for other purposes.
Glyn Valley Tramway Act 1878	41 & 42 Vict. c. ccxxxvii	16 August 1878
An Act to confer further powers on the Glyn Valley Tramway Company; and for other purposes.
Wallasey Tramways Act 1878	41 & 42 Vict. c. ccxxxviii	16 August 1878
An Act to authorise the construction of Tramways in the parish of Wallasey, in the county of Chester; and for other purposes.

=== Private acts ===
Short title	Citation	Royal assent
Long title
Lord Exeter's Estate Act 1878	41 & 42 Vict. c. 1 Pr.	8 August 1878
An Act for authorising the Trustees of the Settled Estates of the Marquess of Exeter to raise moneys on the security of the Settled Estates for the improvement thereof; and for other purposes.
Brooks' Settled Estates Partition Confirmation Act 1878	41 & 42 Vict. c. 2 Pr.	8 August 1878
An Act to confirm a Partition made of certain hereditaments held upon the trusts by the Will of Samuel Brooks, deceased, declared concerning the hereditaments comprised in the Ninth Schedule to the said Will, and the short title of which is intended to be "Brooks' Settled Estates Partition Confirmation Act, 1878."
Cooke Estate Act 1878	41 & 42 Vict. c. 3 Pr.	8 August 1878
An Act for giving effect to a compromise of suits affecting the Estates in the counties of Westmeath and Dublin, in Ireland, late of Adolphus Cooke, deceased.
Marquis of Stafford's Estate Act 1878	41 & 42 Vict. c. 4 Pr.	8 August 1878
An Act for confirming certain Building Leases granted by the late Lord Stafford and the present Lord Stafford of Lands in the borough of Stafford, and in the parish of Castle Church, in the county of Stafford, and in the parish of Shifnal, in the county of Salop, which are subject to the uses of a Settlement of the Family Estates of the said Lords Stafford dated the sixth day of February one thousand eight hundred and thirty-three.
Lord Tredegar's Supplemental Estate Act 1878	41 & 42 Vict. c. 5 Pr.	8 August 1878
An Act to enable the Trustees of the Settlement of Lord Tredegar's Family Estates to take further Shares in the Alexandra (Newport) Dock Company, and for other purposes, and of which the short title is Lord Tredegar's Supplemental Estate Act, 1878.
Traherne's Estate Act 1878	41 & 42 Vict. c. 6 Pr.	8 August 1878
An Act to confirm an Agreement of Compromise made with respect to an estate or farm called Pwllcarn and other hereditaments in the county of Glamorgan, and to provide for raising a sufficient sum for payment of purchase moneys, costs, and expenses in connexion with the said Agreement.
Vane Tempest Settled Estate Act 1878	41 & 42 Vict. c. 7 Pr.	8 August 1878
An Act to be intituled the Vane Tempest Settled Estate Act, 1878.

=== Sources ===
- Chronological Table of the Statutes. 2009. Part 1. Pages 503 to 506.
- Chronological Table and Index of the Statutes, 13th Ed, 1896, vol 1, pp 490 to 495.
- Paterson (ed). The Practical Statutes of the Session 1878. Printed by Horace Cox. 1878. Google
- The Law Reports: The Public General Statutes, passed in . . . 1878. Printed for William Clowes and Sons, printers to the Incorporated Council of Law Reporting for England and Wales. 1878. Volume 13: .
- The Public General Statutes. 1878.
- The Public General Acts of the United Kingdom of Great Britain and Ireland: passed in the Forty-First and Forty-Second Years of . . . Victoria. Edward Bret Ince for the proprietors of the Law Journal Reports. 1878.
- The Public General Acts. 1878.
- The Local Acts passed in the Forty-First and Forty-Second Years of . . . Victoria. 1878. Front matter and chapters i to lxxx: Google. Chapters lxxxi to cxxxvi: Google. Chapters cxxxvii to clxxxiii: Google. Chapters clxxxiv to ccxxxviii: Google.
- The Local Acts. 1878. (Including Acts printed by Nichols and Sons). Google
- The Public General Statutes affecting Scotland, passed in the Forty-First and Forty-Second Years of . . . Victoria. Printed by authority of William Blackwood and Sons. Edinburgh. 1878. Google
- "Readings of New Statutes" in "Magistrates' Law" (1878) 65 The Law Times 29
- (1878) 65 The Law Times 115, 280, 290, 304, 309, 337, 347, 359, 370, 373, 390, 404 and 412
- "Legislation and Jurisprudence" (1878) 65 The Law Times 6, 25, 46, 65, 82, 100, 119, 138, 157, 192, 211, 229, 247, 263 and 281
- The Law Times. Statutes of the United Kingdom. 41 & 42 Vict, A D 1878.
- "New Statutes" (1878) 13 The Law Journal 654 (26 October 1878)
- "Law in Parliament" (1878) 13 The Law Journal 310 and 784
- "Parliamentary Work" (1878) 13 The Law Journal 369 (15 June 1878)
- "Parliamentary Progress" (1878) 13 The Law Journal 264 (27 April 1878)
- "Bills of Private Members" (1878) 13 The Law Journal 71
- "Law Reform and the Session of 1878" (1878) 13 The Law Journal 549 (7 September 1878)
- (1878) 13 The Law Journal 205, 207, 323, 453, 625, 669, 708, 709, 729 and 789
- "Legislation of the Year" (1878) 22 The Solicitors' Journal 901, 913, 937 and 950
- "Legislation of the Week" (1878) 22 The Solicitors' Journal 227, 250, 267, 285, 312, 338, 357, 377, 397, 417, 437, 455, 477, 497, 550, 566, 570, 588, 610, 630, 647, 664, 668, 708, 730, 750, 769, 787, 809, 829 and 846
- (1878) 22 The Solicitors' Journal 513 and 844
- The Solicitors Journal. The Public General Statutes: 41 & 42 Victoriae, 1878.
- "Statutes of the past Session" (1878) 42 The Justice of the Peace 561 and 577
- "Statutes 41 Vict" (1878) 42 The Justice of the Peace 345, 362, 376, 394, 425, 441, 458 and 474
- "Statutes 41 & 42 Vict" (1878) 42 The Justice of the Peace 522, 538, 552, 570, 601, 617, 649, 664 and 680
- "Legislative Intelligence" (1878) 42 The Justice of the Peace 47, 57, 63, 72, 79, 89, 95, 105, 111, 123, 127, 138, 143, 153, 159, 168, 175, 185, 191, 202, 207, 217, 223, 233, 239, 248, 297, 303, 313, 319, 329, 335, 345, 351, 362, 367, 376, 383, 393, 399, 408, 415, 425, 431, 441, 447, 457, 463, 473, 479, 488, 495, 505, 511, 521, 527, 537 and 543
- (1878) 42 The Justice of the Peace 385, 674, 770, 786 and 803
- "Statutes affecting Scotland, 1878" (1878) 22 The Journal of Jurisprudence 593 to 596
- "Legislation of the Session" (1878) 12 Irish Law Times and Solicitors' Journal 406 (3 August 1878)
- The Irish Law Times and Solicitors' Journal. Public General Statutes, 41° & 42° Victoriae (1878).
- "Students' Statutes" (1878) 1 The Law Students' Journal 3 and 4. Reprinted at 71 to 73.
- John F Haynes. The Students' Statutes for 1878. Printed by Horace Cox. London. 1878.
- "The Private Bill Legislation for the Ensuing Session" (1878) 36 The Builder 20
- "Private Bills for Session 1878" (1877 and 1878) 24 Engineering 439 and 476
- "General List of Private Bills, Session, 1878" (1878) 45 The Engineer 95; "Private Bills - Session 1878" at pp 118, 135, 151 and 187.
- "Parliamentary Campaign" (1877) 40 The Railway Times 1082 (8 December 1877); 41 The Railway Times 714
- 9 The British Architect and Northern Engineer 11 (4 January 1878)

== See also ==
- List of acts of the Parliament of the United Kingdom
