= Portsmouth Street Tramways Company =

The Portsmouth Street Tramways Company operated horse tramways in Portsmouth, England. It was started under the terms of the Portsmouth Street Tramways Act 1870 and the Portsmouth Street Tramways (Extensions) Order 1874 and was a wholly owned subsidiary company of the Provincial Tramways Company.

== Route development ==
Gosport Street Tramways Act 1879
- Act of Parliament
- Parliament of the United Kingdom
- Long title: An Act for incorporating the Gosport Street Tramways Company, and for empowering them to construct Tramways; and for other purposes.
- Citation: 42 & 43 Vict. c. xxvii

Dates
- Royal assent: 23 May 1879

Text of statute as originally enacted

Portsmouth, &c. Tramways Act 1879
- Act of Parliament
- Parliament of the United Kingdom
- Long title: An Act for authorising the construction of additional Tramways in the borough of Portsmouth, and to Cosham, in the county of Southampton; and for other purposes.
- Citation: 42 & 43 Vict. c. cxviii

Dates
- Royal assent: 3 July 1879

Text of statute as originally enacted

Gosport Street Tramways Act 1881
- Act of Parliament
- Parliament of the United Kingdom
- Long title: An Act for empowering the Gosport Street Tramways Company to extend their authorised Tramways and for other purposes.
- Citation: 44 & 45 Vict. c. xlvi

Dates
- Royal assent: 3 June 1881

Text of statute as originally enacted

Portsmouth Street Tramways Act 1896
- Act of Parliament
- Parliament of the United Kingdom
- Long title: An Act to confer further powers upon the Portsmouth Street Tramways Company and for other purposes.
- Citation: 59 & 60 Vict. c. cli

Dates
- Royal assent: 20 July 1896

Text of statute as originally enacted

Gosport and Fareham Tramways Act 1903
- Act of Parliament
- Parliament of the United Kingdom
- Long title: An Act to authorise the Portsmouth Street Tramways Company to construct new tramways in the urban districts of Gosport and Alverstoke and of Fareham in the county of Southampton to work such new tramways and to adapt the existing tramways of that Company in the urban district of Gosport and Alverstoke for working by electrical or other mechanical power and for other purposes.
- Citation: 3 Edw. 7. c. cxcv

Dates
- Royal assent: 11 August 1903

Text of statute as originally enacted

The first route in 1874 ran from Broad Street in Old Portsmouth via the town centre to North End with a depot at each end of the route. The trams from North End depot were yellow while those from the Broad Street depot were green. Further routes were developed during the following years authorised by the passing of acts of Parliament and orders including the Landport, Southsea and Portsea Street Tramways Order 1876, the Portsea Street Tramways Order 1877, the Gosport Street Tramways Act 1879 (42 & 43 Vict. c. xxvii), Portsmouth, &c. Tramways Act 1879 (42 & 43 Vict. c. cxviii), the Gosport Street Tramways Act 1881 (44 & 45 Vict. c. xlvi), the Borough of Portsmouth, Kingston, Fratton and Southsea Tramways Act 1887 (50 & 51 Vict. c. cxli), the Portsmouth Street Tramways Act 1896 (59 & 60 Vict. c. cli), and the Gosport and Fareham Tramways Act 1903 (3 Edw. 7. c. cxcv).

In 1878 two rival companies, the Landport and Southsea Tramways Company and the General Tramways Company of Portsmouth were purchased. This allowed the Portsmouth Street Tramways Company to become the dominant tram operator in Portsmouth.

Portsmouth Street Tramways (Amalgamation) Act 1883
- Act of Parliament
- Parliament of the United Kingdom
- Long title: An Act for authorising the amalgamation of the Undertakings of the Portsmouth Street Tramways Company the Gosport Street Tramways Company and the General Tramways Company of Portsmouth Limited and for other purposes.
- Citation: 46 & 47 Vict. c. cxii

Dates
- Royal assent: 16 July 1883

The three tramway companies in Portsmouth together with the Gosport Street Tramways Company were all amalgamated into the Portsmouth Street Tramways Company by the Portsmouth Street Tramways (Amalgamation) Act 1883 (46 & 47 Vict. c. cxii). This resulted in the Portsmouth Street Tramways Company becoming the dominant tram operator in Portsmouth during the next 17 years. Route extensions continued and in 1881 a new tramway was opened from North End to Cosham and this was the first route to extend beyond the town boundary, although the company had an existing horse-drawn omnibus route to Cosham.

== Andrew's Buses ==
As part of the long running trading war between the omnibuses of Solomon Andrews in Cardiff and the Provincial trams in Cardiff the Andrew's buses were also deployed in Plymouth and Portsmouth to compete with Provincial in its other towns. When this conflict, which started in 1872, was resolved in 1887 the omnibus operations of Solomon Andrews were purchased by Provincial and those in Portsmouth were merged with the omnibus routes operated by the Portsmouth Street Tramways Company.

== Municipilisation ==
By 1892 the horse tram network had reached a maximum size of 14 miles of tramway operated by 58 tramcars and 249 horses, each individual route had its own distinguishing colour of car. Most of the route mileage was single track with passing loops and only a limited amount of double track in the town centre. In 1895 Portsmouth Corporation started to talk about taking over and electrifying the tramways and after several years of negotiations and disputes the corporation purchased all of the horse tram network commencing from 1 January 1901. This included the tramway to Cosham which at that time was outside of the town boundaries. The purchase price had to be settled by arbitration at £185,633 which was unfortunate for the company because they had declined an offer from the corporation of £205,964. The Portsmouth Street Tramways Company was left with its other businesses of horse-drawn omnibus operations and wedding cars and funeral hearses and also the horse tramways in Gosport.

Subsequent to the loss of their tram operation in Portsmouth, the Provincial Tramways Company constructed and opened the Portsdown and Horndean Light Railway from Cosham northwards to Horndean but this was under a new company and not the Portsmouth Street Tramways Company.

== Gosport and Fareham ==
Gosport and Fareham Omnibus Services Act 1929
- Act of Parliament
- Parliament of the United Kingdom
- Long title: An Act to authorise the abandonment of the tramways of the Portsmouth Street Tramways Company and to provide for the running of omnibuses in substitution therefor to alter the existing powers of the Company to run omnibuses and to change the Company's name and for other purposes.
- Citation: 19 & 20 Geo. 5. c. lxv

Dates
- Royal assent: 10 May 1929

Text of statute as originally enacted

The horse tram routes in Gosport ran from the Portsmouth ferry terminal via Forton Road to Brockhurst with another line running via Stoke Road to Bury Cross. This operation started as a separate company in 1882 but was merged into the Portsmouth Street Tramways Company in 1883. After surviving an attempted takeover by Gosport and Alverstoke Council the company went on to reconstruct and electrify the tramways and extend the Brockhurst branch to Fareham railway station in 1905. This tramway continued to operate until closure in 1929 when it was replaced by motor bus routes, in the same year the Portsmouth Street Tramways Company was renamed by the Gosport and Fareham Omnibus Services Act 1929 (19 & 20 Geo. 5. c. lxv) to the Gosport and Fareham Omnibus Company.

The Gosport and Fareham Omnibus Company was acquired by the National Bus Company in 1970 but as a statutory company under the 1929 act it retained its identity and continued operating buses in Gosport and Fareham until 1983 when its operations were taken over by a new company, the Provincial Bus Company, and thereafter the Gosport and Fareham Omnibus Company remained as a non-trading dormant company until it was dissolved on 14 October 1987 by the Bus Companies (Dissolution) Order 1987 (SI 1987/1814).
