= Metropolis Management and Building Acts Amendment Act 1878 =

Act of the Parliament of the United Kingdom

Metropolis Management and Building Acts Amendment Act 1878 (Note: Section 1.)
- Act of Parliament
- Parliament of the United Kingdom
- Long title: An Act to amend the Metropolis Management Act, 1855, the Metropolitan Building Act 1855, and the Acts amending the same respectively
- Citation: 41 & 42 Vict. c. 32
- Territorial extent: England and Wales (Note: Section 2.)

Dates
- Royal assent: 22 July 1878
- Commencement: 22 July 1878 (Note: The Acts of Parliament (Commencement) Act 1793.)
- Repealed: 1 April 1965
Other legislation
Amends	Metropolis Management Act 1855; Metropolitan Building Act 1855
Repealed by	London Government Act 1963

Status: Repealed

Text of statute as originally enacted

The Metropolis Management and Building Acts Amendment Act 1878 (41 & 42 Vict. c. 32) was an act of the Parliament of the United Kingdom, which modified the Metropolis Management Act 1855 (18 & 19 Vict. c. 120) and the Metropolitan Building Act 1855 (18 & 19 Vict. c. 122). The act was used to improve the regulation of standards in buildings, and introduced measures to protect the safety of theatres and music halls.

== Provisions ==
Part I contains a prescription to preserve roadways, and prevent buildings from encroaching on them by fences, walls or walls, and then continues to extend powers of regulation to both new and existing theatres and music halls, including the power to make and amend secondary regulations

Part II set rules about the requirements for foundations of buildings, and strengthens the powers of the Metropolitan Board of Works to deal with infractions.

Part III gives powers for the Board to inspect theatres, and to enter houses and other buildings to inspect them, as well as setting out penalties for non-compliance.

== Limitations ==
The act was used to ensure safety in theatres, but only applied to the 'Metropolis' of London and surrounding areas, and whilst other areas referenced the standards, they were not legally enforceable outside London, as was seen when prosecution failed in the case of the Exeter Theatre Royal fire, due to it being in the regions.

== Subsequent developments ==
The whole act was repealed by section 93(1)(b) of, and part II of schedule 18 to, the London Government Act 1963, which came into force on 1 April 1965.
