= Cardiff District and Penarth Harbour Tramways =

Tramway operator in Wales

Operation
- Locale: Cardiff
- Open: 28 November 1881
- Close: 10 February 1903
- Status: Closed

Infrastructure
- Track gauge: 1,435 mm (4 ft 8 1/2 in)
- Propulsion system: Horse

Statistics
- Route length: 2.41 miles (3.88 km)

The Cardiff District and Penarth Harbour Tramways operated a tramway service in Cardiff between 1881 and 1903. Despite the title of the company, the services never reached Penarth.

== History ==
The Cardiff District and Penarth Harbour Tramways Company built a line from Clifton Street in Roath to Clive Street in Grangetown.

From 1881 to 1887, the line was operated by local businessman, Solomon Andrews. From 1888 it was operated by the Provincial Tramways Company

== Closure ==
The line was taken over by Cardiff Corporation on 10 February 1903 for rebuilding and reconstruction. Services were continued by Cardiff Corporation Tramways.
