= Cardiff Tramways Company =

Defunct horse tramway in Cardiff, Wales

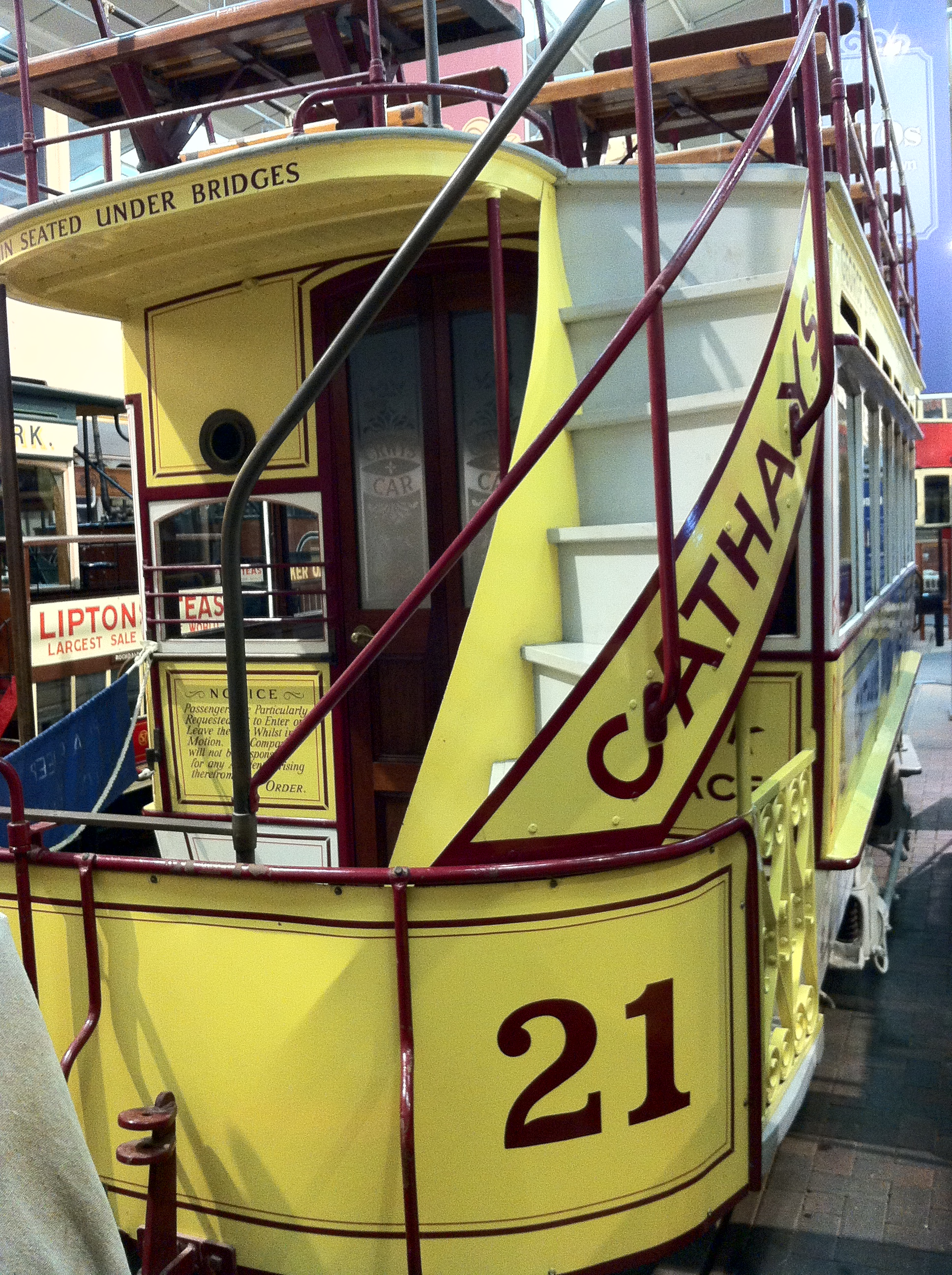
- Tramcar 21 at the National Tramway Museum

Operation
- Locale: Cardiff
- Open: 12 July 1872
- Close: 1 January 1902
- Status: Closed

Infrastructure
- Track gauge: 1,435 mm (4 ft 8 1/2 in)
- Propulsion system: Horse

Statistics
- Route length: 6 miles (9.7 km)

Cardiff Tramways Company operated a horse tramway service in Cardiff between 1872 and 1902.

== History ==
The Provincial Tramways Company was floated in July 1872 by means of a prospectus inviting public subscription for shares in a new company. The published prospectus stated an intention to set up horse tramway companies in various towns including Cardiff. Within a year those in Plymouth and Cardiff were in operation as reported to the half yearly meeting of the company in 1873.

Cardiff Tramways Company was a wholly owned subsidiary company of the Provincial Tramways Company and its first horse tramways were in operation by July 1872 from High Street in the city centre to the Docks, and eventually 6 miles of route were operated. On 10 December 1877, the council approved the operation of services on Christmas Day, subject to some improvements in the operation of the service in general and to the removal of the smell arising from the bad oil used in lighting the cars.

In 1887 after a protracted trading war with the horse-drawn omnibus operations of Solomon Andrews in Cardiff, Plymouth and Portsmouth a settlement was reached whereby the Provincial Tramways Company bought the operations of Solomon Andrews in those towns, full details of the settlement were reported at the company's 30th AGM.

1889 was a year marked by several industrial disputes between the tramway company and its staff reaching a climax at the end of June with serious disorder on the streets as strikers successfully stopped the trams operating.

Cardiff County Borough Council obtained powers in the Cardiff Corporation Act 1898 (61 & 62 Vict. c. cxxviii) to take over all the tramways in the area and go ahead with the new electric trams, owning them from 1902, under the revised name Cardiff Corporation Tramways. The company was operating 52 horse tramcars at the beginning of 1902 when most of the tramways was purchased by the council.

From 1902 the Cardiff Tramways Company continued to operate its omnibuses in Cardiff until 1908, from 1907 it had started to operate motor buses and gradually developed a motor bus fleet of various types. This operation ended on 1 October 1922 when the business, goodwill and assets of the company were sold to Cardiff Corporation. The company was finally put into voluntary liquidation and wound up in 1936.

== Route development ==
The first route opened in 1872 was from Bute Docks Pier Head northwards to the High Street. Later that year another route was opened from the High Street eastwards via The Hayes and Queen Street to Roath later in 1879 extended a further half mile eastwards. Also in 1879 a route westwards from the High Street to Canton was constructed. Another route was built from the High Street southwards to Clarence Road terminating near to the Pier Head line and finally a route was opened from the High Street north to Cathays via Salisbury Road. The complete network was operated by 52 open top double deck horse trams using three depots.

The 1887 takeover of the operations of Solomon Andrews included the operating contract for the Cardiff District and Penarth Harbour Tramways which ran east to west across the city from Roath to Lower Grangetown but it never reached Penarth Harbour. This tramway remained with the Cardiff Tramways Company later than the rest and was only taken over by the council in 1903.
