= Metropolitan Building Act 1855 =

Act of the Parliament of the United Kingdom

- Act of Parliament
- Parliament of the United Kingdom
- Long title: An Act to amend the Laws relating to the Construction of Buildings in the Metropolis and its Neighbourhood.
- Citation: 18 & 19 Vict. c. 122
- Territorial extent: United Kingdom

Dates
- Royal assent: 14 August 1855
- Commencement: 14 August 1855 (Note: The Acts of Parliament (Commencement) Act 1793.)
- Repealed: 1 January 1895
Other legislation
| Amends | Metropolitan Buildings Act 1844; Metropolitan Buildings Act 1846 |
| Amended by | Statute Law Revision Act 1875; Metropolis Management and Building Acts Amendment Act 1878; Public Authorities Protection Act 1893 |
| Repealed by | London Building Act 1894 |
| Relates to | Metropolis Management Act 1855; Factory and Workshop Act 1891 |

Status: Repealed

Text of statute as originally enacted

The Metropolitan Building Act 1855 (18 & 19 Vict. c. 122) was an act of the Parliament of the United Kingdom, concerning standards for buildings within the London "Metropolis", which was separately defined as part of the Metropolis Management Act 1855 (18 & 19 Vict. c. 120) passed in the same year. The act was used to regulate the construction, alteration, and safety of buildings within the city, and is the precursor of modern building regulations.

== Provisions ==
Part I contains which buildings are in scope (which includes all new buildings and alterations to buildings), and sets out rules for the structure and thickness of walls, roofs, chimneys, stairs, and particulars for party walls. It goes on to set a structure for district surveyors, including granting them powers to inspect and enforce the rules.

Part II covers dangerous structures, defining them and giving city commissioners powers to deal with them

Part III goes into detail on party structures

Part IV covers the miscellaneous provisions, particularly around the powers of courts

Part V repeals previous acts

== Subsequent developments ==
Section 108 of the act was repealed by section 2 of, and the schedule to, the Public Authorities Protection Act 1893 (56 & 57 Vict. c. 61), which came into force on 1 January 1894.

The whole act was repealed by section 215 of, and the fourth schedule to, the London Building Act 1894 (57 & 58 Vict. c. ccxiii), which came into force on 1 January 1895.
