= Portsdown and Horndean Light Railway =

Tram service that ran initially from Cosham to Horndean in Hampshire, England

- The tramway in Waterlooville

Overview
- Headquarters: Portsmouth
- Locale: England
- Dates of operation: 2 March 1903–9 January 1935
- Predecessor: Portsmouth Street Tramways Company

Technical
- Track gauge: 4 ft 7 3/4 in (1,416 mm)
- Electrification: overhead catenary
- Length: 5 miles 78.5 chains (9.63 km)

The Portsdown and Horndean Light Railway was a tram service that ran initially from Cosham to Horndean in Hampshire, England.

== History ==
Authorised by the Portsdown and Horndean Light Railway Order 1898 of the Light Railway Commissioners under the Light Railways Act 1896, the Portsdown and Horndean Light Railway opened on 3 March 1903. The company was a wholly owned subsidiary of the Provincial Tramways Company. The system transformed the growth of the Waterlooville, Cowplain and Horndean areas. Guidebooks were produced advertising the benefits of healthy country air and fresh farm food.

== Rolling stock ==
During the construction period, in 1901, the company asked Hampshire County Council to agree to operation of the line using steam locomotives, as the electrical system was viewed as too expensive for the proposed level of service. However, the order authorising the construction of the railway required that steam locomotives could only be used with the approval of the Board of Trade and the consent of the road authorities, and all three district councils involved strongly objected. Thus, the railway had to proceed with electric tramcars, as originally planned.

In 1902 an order for nine tramcars was reported with a subsequent order being placed for additional cars shortly after opening in 1903, which the British Electric Car Company publicised in their advertisements. The fleet was extended again in 1906 with an order for two double deck 4-wheel truck cars from Brush Electrical Engineering.

A steam tramcar, designed by John Grantham, was used experimentally. This was probably a short-term expedient, pending electrification.

The trams were stabled and maintained at a three road tram shed at Cowplain. After closure of the railway, the building was used by the commercial vehicles company Foden. During World War 2, it was requisitioned for use as a torpedo store. The shed was demolished and the site was redeveloped in the 1960s.

== Route ==
The P&HLR route started from a junction with the Portsmouth Corporation Transport street tramway system on the Portsmouth Road, south of Cosham Station. The line then ran north and almost immediately had to ascend to a bridge which was required to cross the London & South Western Railway west of Cosham station. The LSWR had objected to the P&HLR electrified line using their level crossing at Cosham, on the grounds of possible electrical interference to the level crossing signalling from the tram system power supply.

The route then ran alongside the London Road (now A3) throughout and traces can still be seen as extra-wide pavements in several locations, and the abutments of the old bridge over the Southwick Road in Cosham.

From 1924, through running onto Portsmouth Corporation tramlines was introduced, with the light railway trams running firstly to the town hall and later to Clarence Pier and finally to South Parade Pier.

== Track ==
The route was principally single track with passing loops. It was constructed in three distinct sections: the southern section (to the top of Portsdown Hill) resembled a conventional railway, the central section to Waterlooville ran on the public road, whereas the northern section was run at the side of the road.

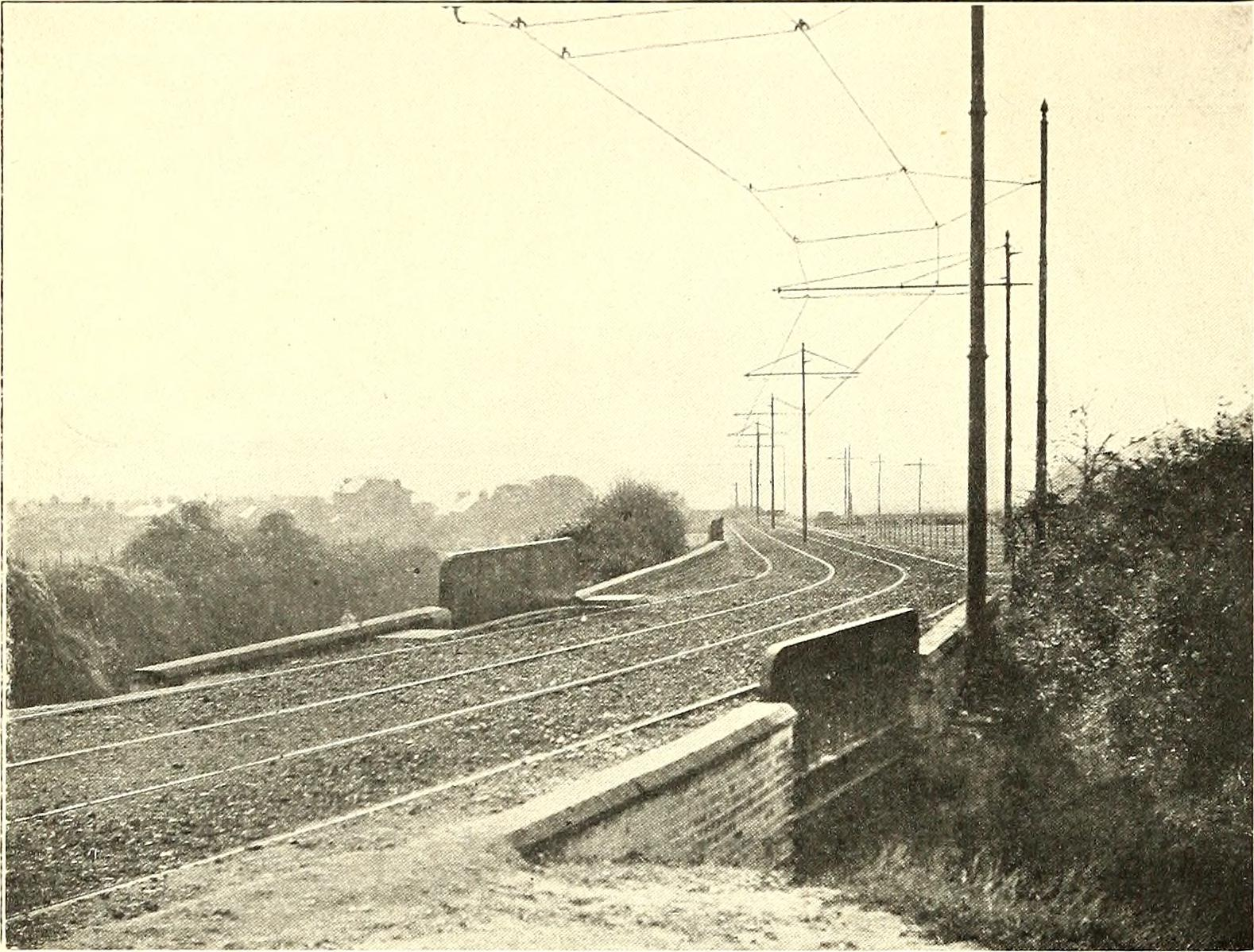
The Portsdown & Horndean Light Railway on Portsdown Hill

On the southern section, the rails were laid on longitudinal concrete stringers. Conventional transverse sleepers were not used, however a ‘tie-bar’ was fitted about every 7 feet to maintain gauge. The track was then ballasted to the rail head. Where the formation comprised significant fill material, a timber framework was used with concrete foundations at the base of the fill.

On the central section shared with the road, the rails were laid on a full-width concrete foundation, and the formation was then paved with granite blocks.

The northern section alongside the road was similar to the southern, with longitudinal concrete stringers, sleepers and ballast.

Rails were a conventional tramway type, 96 lbs/yard in 45 foot lengths, joined by Dicker fishplates. Points were made by F. H. Lloyd & Co. Ltd. of Wednesbury and crossings by Dick, Kerr & Co. Ltd. of Kilmarnock.

== Electrification ==
The railway initially made an agreement with the Portsmouth Corporation Transport company to obtain a traction power connection from their Portsmouth power station, which supplied 3 phase power at 6000V to a substation, midway along the P&HLR line. The substation then produced a 550V traction supply in the same way as the main power station.

In 1905 the P&HLR failed to agree terms for the continued supply of power from Portsmouth, and decided to generate their own power with a power station at Purbrook. By November 1905, it was reported that a contract had been let with Brush to supply an engine and 75kW traction dynamo, followed by a report shortly afterwards of a Brush contract via the Diesel Engine Company for a 100kW version.

The efficiency of the power station was improved in 1907 with the supply of storage battery cells from the DP Battery Company of Bakewell.

== Signalling ==
In about 1923, a signalling system using ‘Clear-way Signals’ was added to control working on the single line sections. Each section was protected by a semaphore signal which was operated by a ’skate’ on the trolley wire, such that each passing tram would indicate that the section was occupied and set the signal accordingly. As trams cleared the single line, they returned the signal to clear, to permit the next tram to enter the section.

== Replacement by buses ==
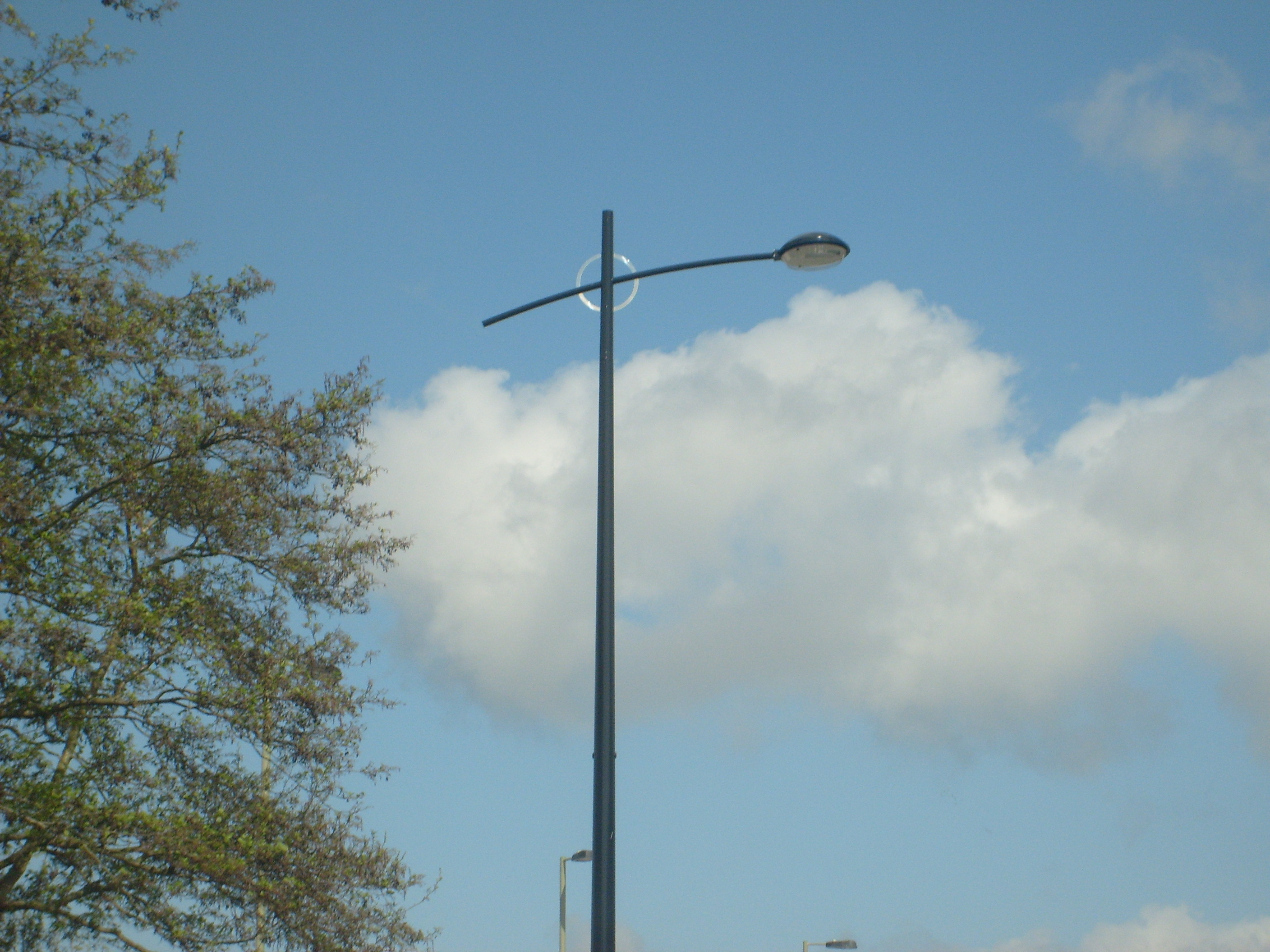
New Urbis lighting along the modern A3 Bus Corridor.

The last tram ran on 9 January 1935, by which time it had been superseded by motor buses, and became the Southdown Bus Company Route 42. The company broke up in 1987 as a result of privatisation, and the route fell into the hands of Transit Holdings which had owned Southdown Portsmouth operations. The company was subsequently bought by FirstGroup in 1995.

In 2006, new lighting was installed along the route as part of Havant Borough Council's bus corridor improvement scheme. The star was then introduced by First Hampshire and Dorset in 2008 as a result of the creation of the A3 corridor.
