= The Provincial Tramways Company =

English company

The Provincial Tramways Company was a holding company for horse tramway companies in various regional towns of England. It was floated in July 1872 by means of a prospectus inviting public subscription for shares in the new company. The published prospectus lists the towns where it was proposed to operate horse tramways as Plymouth. Cardiff, Dundee. Portsmouth. Southampton and Tynemouth. Initially those in Plymouth and Cardiff were constructed and in operation as reported to the half yearly meeting of the company in 1873.

The company failed to open tramways in Dundee, Southampton or Tynemouth but in 1874 a tramway was started in Portsmouth then in 1881 a tramway was started in Grimsby and in 1886 a tramway was opened in Gosport. The registered office of this company was always located in London even after 1936 when its operations were reduced to just the bus services of the Gosport and Fareham Omnibus Company.

The principal towns where subsidiary tramway companies were owned by the Provincial Tramways Company were as follows:-

== Plymouth ==
Plymouth, Stonehouse and Devonport Tramways Company had started a single horse tramway line between the three towns in 1872 this tramway was the first one to be authorized under the provisions of the Tramways Act 1870 (33 & 34 Vict. c. 78) which was used to authorize so many later tramway schemes and provided for their municipalization after 21 years. This tramway was taken over and electrified by the council in 1902 but the company continued to operate the trams under a lease arrangement until 1922. It was also operating horse-drawn omnibuses and later motor buses throughout this period.

== Cardiff ==
The Cardiff Tramways Company started operations in July 1872 and developed a large network of horse tramways in Cardiff but these were taken over and electrified by the council in 1902 however the company continued its omnibus and later motor bus operations until these were also bought by the council in 1922.

== Portsmouth ==
Portsmouth Street Tramways Company started in 1874 and then gradually extended its lines over the city, including in 1878 the purchase of two rival tramway companies, thereafter becoming the principal tramway operator in the city.

In 1901 Portsmouth Corporation bought the tramways in Portsmouth and reconstructed them for electrification.

== Gosport and Fareham ==
Gosport Street Tramways Company started a horse tramway in Gosport in 1882 but in 1883 the company was amalgamated with the Portsmouth operation and the Gosport trams were subsequently operated by the Portsmouth Street Tramways Company.

The Gosport tramway was extended to Fareham and electrified starting in 1906 and a new company, the Gosport and Alverstoke Electric Lighting Company, was formed to operate the power station at Hoeford, this supplied electricity to both the tramway and local domestic users.

Subsequently, in 1929 the Gosport to Fareham tramway was closed and replaced by an expanded bus operation at the same time the Portsmouth Street Tramways Company was renamed to Gosport and Fareham Omnibus Company. This was a statutory company under the terms of the Gosport and Fareham Omnibus Services Act 1929, and this company continued bus operations in Gosport and Fareham until 1983.

== Grimsby ==
Great Grimsby Street Tramways Company started a horse tramway Grimsby in 1881 later extending to Cleethorpes in 1887. This was electrified in 1901 and the Grimsby end of the route was bought by Grimsby Council in 1925 and the rest was bought by Cleethorpes Council in 1936. This company had also operated a substantial fleet of motor buses and charabancs and this operation was finally disposed of to the Lincolnshire Road Car Company which bought them in June 1936 .

== Horndean ==
The Portsdown and Horndean Light Railway Company operated a new tramway between Cosham and Horndean starting in 1903 it was abandoned in 1935.

== Company restructuring ==
In 1936 the whole company was re-organised with all the subsidiary companies being liquidated except for the Gosport and Fareham Omnibus Company. The holding company, the Provincial Tramways Company, was wound up and its remaining assets transferred into a newly formed company, the Provincial Traction Company.

== The Provincial Traction Company ==
Provincial Traction went on during the 1950s to purchase various motor trading companies including, in two bites, the Swain Group. First in October 1959: H.R. Owen Ltd., Hoffmans of Halifax Ltd., and Hoffmans of Sheffield Ltd., making Provincial Traction one of the largest Rolls-Royce dealers in Britain, and second, in March 1961: Harold Radford (Coachbuilders) Ltd., Sheffield's Joseph Tomlinson & Sons Ltd., Edwards & Co (Bournemouth), Edwards & Co (Boscombe), and Thomas Greenwood's Sons Ltd. The annual report for 1960 reported excellent results from these businesses which generated a profit of £135,000 with a further £47,000 profit from the remaining bus operation in Gosport and Fareham.

The early 1960s were the high point for Provincial Traction. Subsequently, profits declined and in 1969 it was taken over by the Wiles Group (later renamed Hanson Trust). At the end of that year with the motor companies having been hived off via Lex Group to Heron Holdings Provincial Traction was sold to the state owned National Bus Company. Provincial Traction itself was then liquidated but its sole remaining subsidiary, the Gosport and Fareham Omnibus Company, retained its separate identity within National Bus for the next 13 years.
