= Representation of the People Act 1884 =

Act of the Parliament of the United Kingdom reforming the electoral system

Representation of the People Act 1884 (Note: Section 1.)
- Act of Parliament
- Parliament of the United Kingdom
- Long title: An Act to amend the Law relating to the Representation of the People of the United Kingdom.
- Citation: 48 & 49 Vict. c. 3
- Introduced by: William Gladstone
- Territorial extent: United Kingdom

Dates
- Royal assent: 6 December 1884
- Commencement: 1 January 1885 (Note: Section 13.)
- Repealed: 6 February 1918
Other legislation
Repealed by	Representation of the People Act 1918
Relates to	Municipal Voters Relief Act 1885; Elections (Hours of Poll) Act 1885; Redistribution of Seats Act 1885

Status: Repealed

Text of statute as originally enacted

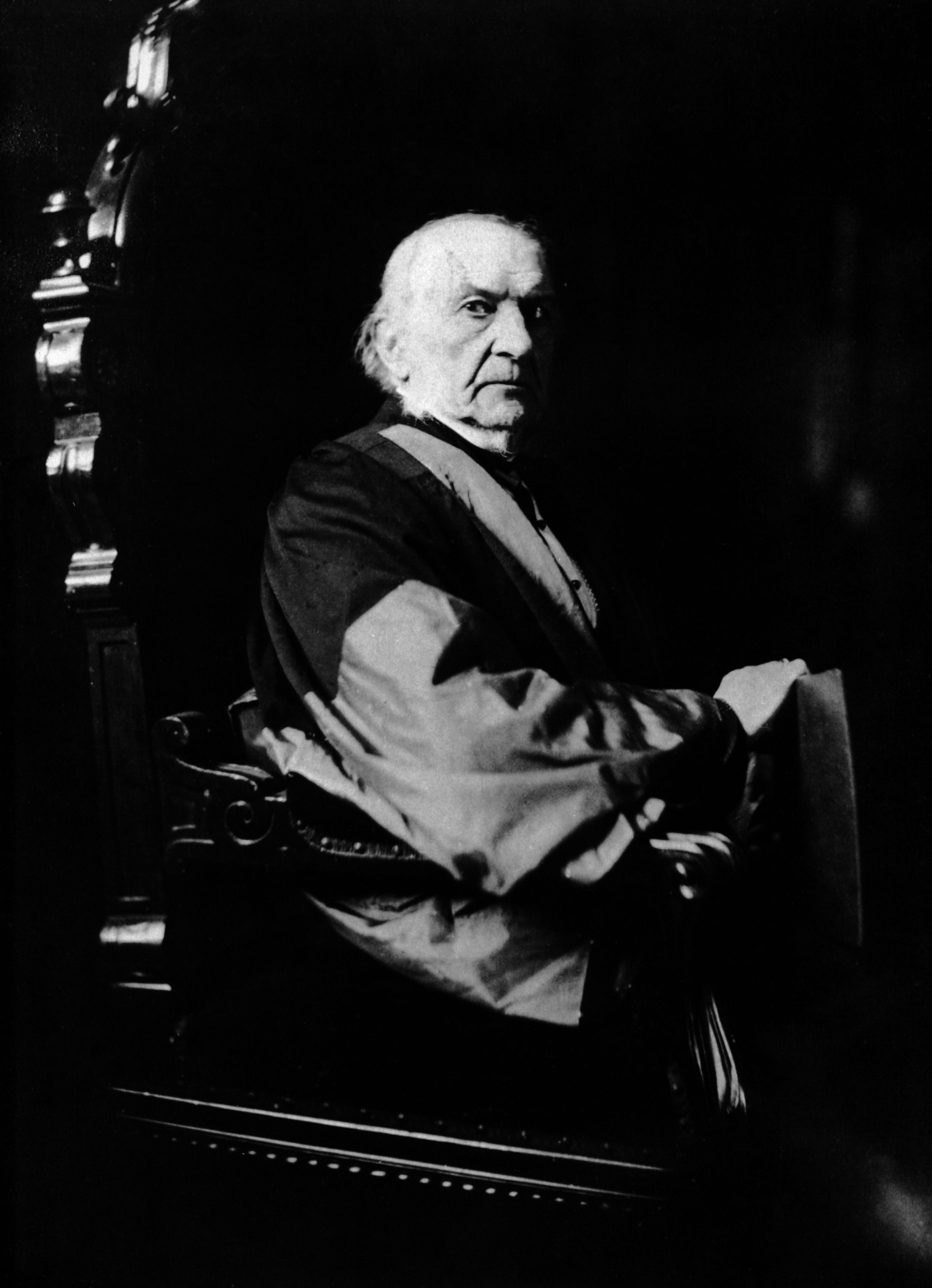
William Ewart Gladstone in 1884.

The Representation of the People Act 1884 (48 & 49 Vict. c. 3), also known informally as the Third Reform Act, was an act of the Parliament of the United Kingdom passed under the premiership of William Gladstone. Together with the Redistribution of Seats Act 1885 (c. 23) of the following year, the act which further extended the suffrage in the UK after the Derby government's Reform Act 1867 (30 & 31 Vict. c. 102). Taken together, these measures extended the same voting qualifications as existed in the towns to the countryside, more than doubling the electorate in the counties, and essentially established the modern one member constituency as the normal pattern for parliamentary representation.

The bill was introduced by Gladstone on 28 February 1884. The Conservative-dominated House of Lords rejected the bill on 17 July but then passed it. It gained royal assent on 6 December of that year.

The act extended the 1867 concessions from the boroughs to the countryside. All men paying an annual rental of £10 and all those holding land valued at £10 now had the vote. This significantly increased the electorate; in the 1880 general election, before the passing of the act, 3,040,050 voters were registered, while in the 1885 general election, after the passing of the Act, there were 5,708,030 registered voters. The bill was so objectionable to the House of Lords that Gladstone was forced to separate the legislation into two bills, the second being the Redistribution of Seats Act 1885, which redistributed constituencies in order to equalise representation within constituencies across the UK.

The 1884 Reform Act did not establish universal suffrage: although the size of the electorate was increased considerably, all women and 40% of men were still without the vote. Male suffrage varied throughout the kingdom, too: in England and Wales, two in three adult males had the vote; in Scotland, three in five did; in Ireland, the figure was one in two.

== Key sections of the act ==
Section 2: This extended a uniform household (freeholder and leaseholder) franchise to all parliamentary boroughs and counties in the United Kingdom.

Section 3: Men inhabiting a dwelling-house as an employee, whose employer did not live there, were to be treated for franchise purposes as if they were occupying as tenants.

Section 4: Prohibition of multiplicity of votes. This was not to stop people acquiring multiple votes in different constituencies (plural voting was still permitted), but to restrict sub-division of one property to qualify multiple voters (so-called faggot voters).

Section 5a: A man who was a £10 occupier in a county or borough was to be a voter in that county or borough. This assimilated the previous county occupation franchise and borough occupation franchise into a uniform occupation franchise.

Section 6: Occupation in a borough was not to confer a county franchise.

== Effects ==
As many crofters in the Scottish Highlands qualified as £10 occupiers, the Act empowered Scottish Gaels to take action against evictions and rent increases at the end of the Highland Clearances. Their votes led to the formation of the Crofters' Party and Highland Land League, and eventually the passage of the Crofters' Holdings (Scotland) Act 1886, which addressed many of their grievances and put an end to the Highland Clearances.

== See also ==
- Democracy in Europe
- Reform Acts
- Representation of the People Act
- Parliamentary franchise in the United Kingdom 1885–1918
- Medical Relief Disqualification Removal Act 1885

== Bibliography ==
- The Statutes: Second Revised Edition, Vol. XVI 1884–1886, (printed by authority 1900)
