= List of acts of the Parliament of the United Kingdom from 1885 =

This is a complete list of acts of the Parliament of the United Kingdom for the year 1885.

Note that the first parliament of the United Kingdom was held in 1801; parliaments between 1707 and 1800 were either parliaments of Great Britain or of Ireland). For acts passed up until 1707, see the list of acts of the Parliament of England and the list of acts of the Parliament of Scotland. For acts passed from 1707 to 1800, see the list of acts of the Parliament of Great Britain. See also the list of acts of the Parliament of Ireland.

For acts of the devolved parliaments and assemblies in the United Kingdom, see the list of acts of the Scottish Parliament, the list of acts of the Northern Ireland Assembly, and the list of acts and measures of Senedd Cymru; see also the list of acts of the Parliament of Northern Ireland.

The number shown after each act's title is its chapter number. Acts passed before 1963 are cited using this number, preceded by the year(s) of the reign during which the relevant parliamentary session was held; thus the Union with Ireland Act 1800 is cited as "39 & 40 Geo. 3 c. 67", meaning the 67th act passed during the session that started in the 39th year of the reign of George III and which finished in the 40th year of that reign. Note that the modern convention is to use Arabic numerals in citations (thus "41 Geo. 3" rather than "41 Geo. III"). Acts of the last session of the Parliament of Great Britain and the first session of the Parliament of the United Kingdom are both cited as "41 Geo. 3". Acts passed from 1963 onwards are simply cited by calendar year and chapter number.

All modern acts have a short title, e.g. the Local Government Act 2003. Some earlier acts also have a short title given to them by later acts, such as by the Short Titles Act 1896.

== 48 & 49 Vict. ==
Continuing the sixth session of the 22nd Parliament of the United Kingdom, which met from 23 October 1884 until 14 August 1885.

=== Public general acts ===
Short title	Citation	Royal assent
Long title
Consolidated Fund (No. 2) Act 1885 (repealed)	48 & 49 Vict. c. 6	28 March 1885
An Act to apply certain sums out of the Consolidated Fund to the service of the years ending on the thirty first day of March one thousand eight hundred and eighty-four, one thousand eight hundred and eighty-five, and one thousand eight hundred and eighty-six. (Repealed by Statute Law Revision Act 1898 (61 & 62 Vict. c. 22))
Cape of Good Hope (Advance) Act 1885 (repealed)	48 & 49 Vict. c. 7	28 March 1885
An Act to authorise an advance to the Government of the Colony of the Cape of Good Hope. (Repealed by Statute Law Revision Act 1898 (61 & 62 Vict. c. 22))
Army (Annual) Act 1885 (repealed)	48 & 49 Vict. c. 8	28 April 1885
An Act to provide, during twelve months, for the Discipline and Regulation of the Army. (Repealed by Statute Law Revision Act 1898 (61 & 62 Vict. c. 22), Army and Air Force (Annual) Act 1932 (22 & 23 Geo. 5. c. 22) and Revision of the Army and Air Force Acts (Transitional Provisions) Act 1955 (3 & 4 Eliz. 2. c. 20))
Municipal Voters Relief Act 1885 (repealed)	48 & 49 Vict. c. 9	28 April 1885
An Act to relieve Municipal Voters from being disqualified in consequence of letting their Dwelling-houses for short periods. (Repealed by Statute Law Revision Act 1898 (61 & 62 Vict. c. 22) and Representation of the People Act 1918 (7 & 8 Geo. 5. c. 64))
Elections (Hours of Poll) Act 1885 (repealed)	48 & 49 Vict. c. 10	28 April 1885
An Act to extend the Hours of Polling at Parliamentary and Municipal Elections. (Repealed for England and Wales and Scotland by Representation of the People Act 1948 (11 & 12 Geo. 6. c. 65) and for Northern Ireland by Elections and Franchise Act (Northern Ireland) 1946 (c. 8 (N.I.)))
Egyptian Loan Act 1885 (repealed)	48 & 49 Vict. c. 11	21 May 1885
An Act to enable Her Majesty to give a Guarantee for the purpose of facilitating the raising of a Loan by the Government of Egypt. (Repealed by Statute Law Revision Act 1963 (c. 30))
Constabulary (Ireland) Redistribution Act 1885 (repealed)	48 & 49 Vict. c. 12	21 May 1885
An Act to amend the Law relating to the Distribution of the Royal Irish Constabulary Force. (Repealed by Statute Law Revision Act 1898 (61 & 62 Vict. c. 22) and Statute Law Revision Act (Northern Ireland) 1954 (c. 35 (N.I.)))
Highway Act Amendment Act 1885 (repealed)	48 & 49 Vict. c. 13	21 May 1885
An Act to amend the Law relating to Highways. (Repealed by Highways Act 1959 (7 & 8 Eliz. 2. c. 25))
Consolidated Fund (No. 3) Act 1885 (repealed)	48 & 49 Vict. c. 14	21 May 1885
An Act to apply the sum of thirteen million three hundred and fifteen thousand three hundred and thirty four pounds out of the Consolidated Fund to the service of the year ending on the thirty-first day of March one thousand eight hundred and eighty-six. (Repealed by Statute Law Revision Act 1898 (61 & 62 Vict. c. 22))
Registration Act 1885 (repealed)	48 & 49 Vict. c. 15	21 May 1885
An Act to assimilate the Law affecting the Registration of Occupation Voters in Counties and Boroughs, and for other purposes. (Repealed by Representation of the People Act 1948 (11 & 12 Geo. 6. c. 65))
Registration Amendment (Scotland) Act 1885 (repealed)	48 & 49 Vict. c. 16	21 May 1885
An Act to amend the Law regulating the Registration of Voters in Scotland; and for other purposes relating thereto. (Repealed by Local Government (Scotland) Act 1975 (c. 30))
Parliamentary Registration (Ireland) Act 1885 (repealed)	48 & 49 Vict. c. 17	21 May 1885
An Act to amend the law relating to the Registration of Parliamentary Voters in Ireland, and for other purposes connected therewith. (Repealed by Representation of the People Act 1948 (11 & 12 Geo. 6. c. 65) and Statute Law Revision Act (Northern Ireland) 1954 (c. 35 (N.I.)))
Metropolitan Streets Act 1885 (repealed)	48 & 49 Vict. c. 18	21 May 1885
An Act to extend the Area to which the Metropolitan Streets Act, 1867, (Note: Metropolitan Streets Act 1867 (30 & 31 Vict. c. 134)) applies. (Repealed by Statute Law (Repeals) Act 1993 (c. 50))
Industrial Schools (Ireland) Act 1885 (repealed)	48 & 49 Vict. c. 19	21 May 1885
An Act further to facilitate the building, enlargement, and maintenance of Industrial Schools in Ireland. (Repealed by Children Act 1908 (8 Edw. 7. c. 67))
Barristers Admission (Ireland) Act 1885 (repealed)	48 & 49 Vict. c. 20	21 May 1885
An Act to amend the Law relating to the Admission of Barristers in Ireland. (Repealed by Repeal of Unnecessary Laws Act (Northern Ireland) 1953 (c. 5 (N.I.)))
Burial Boards (Contested Elections) Act 1885 (repealed)	48 & 49 Vict. c. 21	25 June 1885
An Act to amend the Law with respect to Contested Elections of Burial Boards. (Repealed by Local Government Act 1972 (c. 70))
Public Health and Local Government Conferences Act 1885 (repealed)	48 & 49 Vict. c. 22	25 June 1885
An Act to provide for Expenses incurred in relation to Conferences of Local Authorities. (Repealed for England and Wales by Local Government Act 1933 (23 & 24 Geo. 5. c. 51) and for Northern Ireland by Public Health and Local Government (Miscellaneous Provisions) Act (Northern Ireland) 1962 (c. 12 (N.I.)))
Redistribution of Seats Act 1885 or the Reform Act 1885 (repealed)	48 & 49 Vict. c. 23	25 June 1885
An Act for the Redistribution of Seats at Parliamentary Elections, and for other Purposes. (Repealed for England and Wales and Scotland by Representation of the People Act 1948 (11 & 12 Geo. 6. c. 65) and for Northern Ireland by Electoral Law Act (Northern Ireland) 1962 (c. 14 (N.I.)))
Annuity for Princess Beatrice Act 1885 (repealed)	48 & 49 Vict. c. 24	25 June 1885
An Act to enable Her Majesty to settle an Annuity on Her Royal Highness the Princess Beatrice Mary Victoria Feodore. (Repealed by Statute Law (Repeals) Act 1971 (c. 52))
East India Unclaimed Stock Act 1885 (repealed)	48 & 49 Vict. c. 25	16 July 1885
An Act for making provision for the transfer to the Secretary of State in Council of India of Unclaimed India Stock and Dividends; and for amending the East Indian Railway Company Purchase Act, 1879, (Note: East Indian Railway Company Purchase Act 1879 (42 & 43 Vict. c. ccvi)) and the East Indian Railway (Redemption of Annuities) Act, 1881; (Note: East Indian Railway (Redemption of Annuities) Act 1881 (44 & 45 Vict. c. 53)) and for other purposes. (Repealed by Statute Law (Repeals) Act 1993 (c. 50))
Yorkshire Registries Amendment Act 1885 (repealed)	48 & 49 Vict. c. 26	16 July 1885
An Act to amend the Yorkshire Registries Act, 1884. (Note: Yorkshire Registries Act 1884 (47 & 48 Vict. c. 54)) (Repealed by Law of Property Act 1969 (c. 59))
Friendly Societies Amendment Act 1885 (repealed)	48 & 49 Vict. c. 27	16 July 1885
An Act to declare the true meaning of section twenty-two of the Friendly Societies Act, 1875. (Note: Friendly Societies Act 1875 (38 & 39 Vict. c. 60)) (Repealed by Friendly Societies Act 1887 (50 & 51 Vict. c. 56))
East India Loan Act 1885 (repealed)	48 & 49 Vict. c. 28	22 July 1885
An Act to enable the Secretary of State in Council of India to raise Money in the United Kingdom for the Service of the Government of India. (Repealed by East India Loans Act 1937 (1 Edw. 8 & 1 Geo. 6. c. 14))
Honorary Freedom of Boroughs Act 1885 (repealed)	48 & 49 Vict. c. 29	22 July 1885
An Act to enable municipal corporations to confer the honorary freedom of boroughs upon persons of distinction. (Repealed by Local Government Act 1933 (23 & 24 Geo. 5. c. 51))
Local Loans Sinking Funds Act 1885 (repealed)	48 & 49 Vict. c. 30	22 July 1885
An Act to amend the Local Loans Act, 1875, (Note: Local Loans Act 1875 (38 & 39 Vict. c. 83)) as regards the establishment of a Sinking Fund. (Repealed by Statute Law Revision Act 1898 (61 & 62 Vict. c. 22) and Statute Law (Repeals) Act 1989 (c. 43))
Ecclesiastical Commissioners Act 1885 (repealed)	48 & 49 Vict. c. 31	22 July 1885
An Act for amending the Ecclesiastical Commissioners Acts, and for other purposes. (Repealed by Statute Law (Repeals) Act 1975 (c. 10))
Tithe Rentcharge Redemption Act 1885 (repealed)	48 & 49 Vict. c. 32	22 July 1885
An Act to amend and extend the Acts relating to the redemption of Tithe Rentcharge in England and Wales. (Repealed by Statute Law (Repeals) Act 1998 (c. 43))
Metropolis Management Amendment Act 1885 (repealed)	48 & 49 Vict. c. 33	31 July 1885
An Act to amend the Metropolis Management Acts. (Repealed by Local Law (Greater London Council and Inner London Boroughs) Order 1965 (SI 1965/540))
Water Rate Definition Act 1885	48 & 49 Vict. c. 34	31 July 1885
An Act to declare and explain the sixty–eighth section of the Waterworks Clauses Act, 1847. (Note: Waterworks Clauses Act 1847 (10 & 11 Vict. c. 17))
Public Health (Ships, &c.) Act 1885 (repealed)	48 & 49 Vict. c. 35	31 July 1885
An Act to amend the Public Health Act, 1875, (Note: Public Health Act 1875 (38 & 39 Vict. c. 55)) in relation to Ships and Port Sanitary Authorities. (Repealed by Public Health Act 1936 (26 Geo. 5 & 1 Edw. 8. c. 49))
Artillery and Rifle Ranges Act 1885 (repealed)	48 & 49 Vict. c. 36	31 July 1885
An Act to provide for the regulation of land held by one of Her Majesty's Principal Secretaries of State or a Volunteer Corps for an Artillery or Rifle Range, or a School of Gunnery, or like purposes. (Repealed by Military Lands Act 1892 (55 & 56 Vict. c. 43) and Military Lands Act 1900 (63 & 64 Vict. c. 56))
Annual Turnpike Acts Continuance Act 1885 (repealed)	48 & 49 Vict. c. 37	31 July 1885
An Act to continue certain Turnpike Acts, and to repeal certain other Turnpike Acts; and for other purposes connected therewith. (Repealed by Statute Law Revision Act 1898 (61 & 62 Vict. c. 22))
School Boards Act 1885 (repealed)	48 & 49 Vict. c. 38	31 July 1885
An Act to amend the Law relating to School Boards so far as affected by the incorporation of a Municipal Borough and as respects the divisions of the Metropolis. (Repealed by Education (London) Act 1903 (3 Edw. 7. c. 24) and Local Government Act 1933 (23 & 24 Geo. 5. c. 51))
Cholera Hospitals (Ireland) Act 1885 (repealed)	48 & 49 Vict. c. 39	31 July 1885
An Act to enable the sanitary authorities in Ireland to take possession of land for the erection of temporary Cholera Hospitals. (Repealed by Statute Law Revision Act 1898 (61 & 62 Vict. c. 22))
Polehampton Estates Act 1885 (repealed)	48 & 49 Vict. c. 40	31 July 1885
An Act to provide for the application to charitable purposes of such portion of the property subject to the Will of Edward Polehampton as is now vested in the Crown, and for the management and application of the said property. (Repealed by Statute Law (Repeals) Act 1981 (c. 19))
Shannon Act 1885	48 & 49 Vict. c. 41	31 July 1885
An Act to make provision with respect to the maintenance of certain Piers and other works in the estuary of the River Shannon.
Greenwich Hospital Act 1885	48 & 49 Vict. c. 42	31 July 1885
An Act to provide for defraying the Expenditure on account of Greenwich Hospital directly out of the Revenues of Greenwich Hospital; to amend in other respects the Greenwich Hospital Acts, 1865 to 1883; and to amend the law relating to the Naval Knights of Windsor.
National Debt Act 1885 (repealed)	48 & 49 Vict. c. 43	31 July 1885
An Act to suspend for a period certain Payments on Annuities created under the National Debt Act, 1883; (Note: National Debt Act 1883 (46 & 47 Vict. c. 54)) and to reduce for a like period the Permanent Annual Charge of the National Debt. (Repealed by National Debt and Local Loans Act 1887 (50 & 51 Vict. c. 16))
Exchequer and Treasury Bills Act 1885 (repealed)	48 & 49 Vict. c. 44	31 July 1885
An Act to raise the sum of Four million pounds by Exchequer Bills or Treasury Bills, for the service of the year ending on the thirty-first day of March one thousand eight hundred and eighty-six. (Repealed by Statute Law Revision Act 1898 (61 & 62 Vict. c. 22))
Post Office (Sites) Act 1885	48 & 49 Vict. c. 45	31 July 1885
An Act to enable Her Majesty's Postmaster General to acquire lands in London, Birmingham, Bristol, and Newcastle-upon-Tyne for the public service.
Medical Relief Disqualification Removal Act 1885 (repealed)	48 & 49 Vict. c. 46	6 August 1885
An Act to prevent Medical Relief disqualifying a person from voting. (Repealed by Statute Law Revision Act 1898 (61 & 62 Vict. c. 22) and Representation of the People Act 1918 (7 & 8 Geo. 5. c. 64))
Bankruptcy (Office Accommodation) Act 1885 (repealed)	48 & 49 Vict. c. 47	6 August 1885
An Act to enable the Treasury to provide out of surplus funds arising under the Bankruptcy Act, 1883, (Note: Bankruptcy Act 1883 (46 & 47 Vict. c. 52)) office accommodation for officers appointed under the said Act. (Repealed by Bankruptcy Act 1914 (4 & 5 Geo. 5. c. 59))
Earldom of Mar Restitution Act 1885	48 & 49 Vict. c. 48	6 August 1885
An Act for restitution of the ancient dignity and title of Earl of Mar.
Submarine Telegraph Act 1885	48 & 49 Vict. c. 49	6 August 1885
An Act to carry into effect an International Convention for the Protection of Submarine Telegraph Cables.
Metropolitan Board of Works (Money) Act 1885 (repealed)	48 & 49 Vict. c. 50	6 August 1885
An Act further to amend the Acts relating to the raising of Money by the Metropolitan Board of Works; and for other purposes. (Repealed by London County Council (Finance Consolidation) Act 1912 (2 & 3 Geo. 5. c. cv))
Customs and Inland Revenue Act 1885 (repealed)	48 & 49 Vict. c. 51	6 August 1885
An Act to grant certain Duties of Customs and Inland Revenue, and to amend the laws relating to Customs and Inland Revenue. (Repealed for Northern Ireland by Statute Law Revision Act 1953 (2 & 3 Eliz. 2. c. 5) and for England and Wales and Scotland by Finance Act 1959 (7 & 8 Eliz. 2. c. 58))
Lunacy Acts Amendment Act 1885 (repealed)	48 & 49 Vict. c. 52	6 August 1885
An Act to amend the Law relating to Lunatics. (Repealed by Lunacy Act 1890 (53 & 54 Vict. c. 5))
Public Health (Members and Officers) Act 1885 (repealed)	48 & 49 Vict. c. 53	6 August 1885
An Act to amend the Public Health Act, 1875, with respect to the Members and Officers of Local Authorities. (Repealed by Local Government Act 1933 (23 & 24 Geo. 5. c. 51))
Pluralities Acts Amendment Act 1885 (repealed)	48 & 49 Vict. c. 54	6 August 1885
An Act to amend the Law relating to Pluralities. (Repealed by Statute Law (Repeals) Measure 2018 (No. 1))
Ecclesiastical Commissioners Act 1840, Amendment Act 1885 (repealed)	48 & 49 Vict. c. 55	6 August 1885
An Act to explain section thirty-four of the Ecclesiastical Commissioners Act, 1840. (Note: Ecclesiastical Commissioners Act 1840 (3 & 4 Vict. c. 113)) (Repealed by Archdeaconries (Augmentation) Measure 1953 (No. 4))
Parliamentary Elections Corrupt Practices Act 1885 (repealed)	48 & 49 Vict. c. 56	6 August 1885
An Act to amend the Law with respect to Corrupt Practices at Parliamentary Elections. (Repealed for England and Wales and Scotland by Representation of the People Act 1949 (12, 13 & 14 Geo. 6. c. 68) and for Northern Ireland by Electoral Law Act (Northern Ireland) 1962 (c. 14 (N.I.)))
Revising Barristers Act 1885 (repealed)	48 & 49 Vict. c. 57	6 August 1885
An Act to remove doubts as to the appointment of Revising Barristers. (Repealed by Statute Law Revision Act 1898 (61 & 62 Vict. c. 22))
Telegraph Act 1885 (repealed)	48 & 49 Vict. c. 58	14 August 1885
An Act to amend the Telegraph Acts, 1863 to 1878. (Repealed by Telegraph Act 1962 (10 & 11 Eliz. 2. c. 14))
Expiring Laws Continuance Act 1885 (repealed)	48 & 49 Vict. c. 59	14 August 1885
An Act to continue various expiring Laws. (Repealed by Statute Law Revision Act 1898 (61 & 62 Vict. c. 22))
Federal Council of Australasia Act 1885 (repealed)	48 & 49 Vict. c. 60	14 August 1885
An Act to constitute a Federal Council of Australasia. (Repealed by Commonwealth of Australia Constitution Act 1900 (63 & 64 Vict. c. 12))
Secretary for Scotland Act 1885	48 & 49 Vict. c. 61	14 August 1885
An Act for appointing a Secretary for Scotland and Vice-President of the Scotch Education Department.
Parliamentary Elections (Returning Officers) Act 1885 (repealed)	48 & 49 Vict. c. 62	14 August 1885
An Act to amend the law relating to the Charges of Returning Officers at Parliamentary Elections. (Repealed by Representation of the People Act 1918 (7 & 8 Geo. 5. c. 64))
Patents, Designs, and Trade Marks (Amendment) Act 1885 (repealed)	48 & 49 Vict. c. 63	14 August 1885
An Act to amend the Patents, Designs, and Trade Marks Act, 1883. (Note: Patents, Designs, and Trade Marks Act 1883 (46 & 47 Vict. c. 57)) (Repealed by Patents and Designs Act 1907 (7 Edw. 7. c. 29))
Appropriation Act 1885 (repealed)	48 & 49 Vict. c. 64	14 August 1885
An Act to apply a sum out of the Consolidated Fund to the service of the year ending on the thirty-first day of March one thousand eight hundred and eighty-six, and to appropriate the Supplies granted in this Session of Parliament. (Repealed by Statute Law Revision Act 1898 (61 & 62 Vict. c. 22))
Public Works Loans Act 1885 (repealed)	48 & 49 Vict. c. 65	14 August 1885
An Act to appoint Public Works Loan Commissioners, to grant Money for the purpose of Loans by the Public Works Loan Commissioners and the Commissioners of Public Works in Ireland and for the purpose of loans and purchases by the Irish Land Commission, and to make other provisions relating to those Commissioners. (Repealed by Statute Law Revision Act 1898 (61 & 62 Vict. c. 22))
Registration Appeals (Ireland) Act 1885 (repealed)	48 & 49 Vict. c. 66	14 August 1885
An Act to accelerate the hearing of Appeals under the Acts relating to the Registration of Voters in Ireland in the year one thousand eight hundred and eighty-five. (Repealed by Statute Law Revision Act 1898 (61 & 62 Vict. c. 22))
Indian Army Pension Deficiency Act 1885 (repealed)	48 & 49 Vict. c. 67	14 August 1885
An Act to provide for the discharge of the liability of the Consolidated Fund in respect of certain Indian Army Pensions. (Repealed by Statute Law Revision Act 1950 (14 Geo. 6. c. 6))
Metropolitan Police Staff Superannuation Act 1885 (repealed)	48 & 49 Vict. c. 68	14 August 1885
An Act to amend the Metropolitan Police Staff Superannuation Act, 1875. (Note: Metropolitan Police Staff (Superannuation) Act 1875 (38 & 39 Vict. c. 28)) (Repealed by Superannuation (Miscellaneous Provisions) Act 1967 (c. 28))
Criminal Law Amendment Act 1885 or Stead's Act	48 & 49 Vict. c. 69	14 August 1885
An Act to make further provision for the Protection of Women and Girls, the suppression of brothels, and other purposes. (Repealed for England and Wales by Sexual Offences Act 1956 (4 & 5 Eliz. 2. c. 69) and for Scotland by Sexual Offences (Scotland) Act 1976 (c. 67))
Sea Fisheries (Scotland) Amendment Act 1885	48 & 49 Vict. c. 70	14 August 1885
An Act to amend the Law relating to Scottish Sea Fisheries and for other purposes relating thereto.
County Officers and Courts (Ireland) Amendment Act 1885 (repealed)	48 & 49 Vict. c. 71	14 August 1885
An Act to amend the County Officers and Courts (Ireland) Act, 1877, (Note: County Officers and Courts (Ireland) Act 1877 (40 & 41 Vict. c. 56)) in relation to the Pensions of Clerks of the Crown and Clerks of the Peace. (Repealed by Statute Law Revision Act 1898 (61 & 62 Vict. c. 22) and Statute Law Revision Act (Northern Ireland) 1954 (c. 35 (N.I.)))
Housing of the Working Classes Act 1885 (repealed)	48 & 49 Vict. c. 72	14 August 1885
An Act to amend the Law relating to Dwellings of the Working Classes. (Repealed for Scotland by Statute Law (Repeals) Act 1981 (c. 19) and for England and Wales by Statute Law (Repeals) Act 1995 (c. 44))
Purchase of Land (Ireland) Act 1885 or the Ashbourne Act	48 & 49 Vict. c. 73	14 August 1885
An Act to provide greater facilities for the Sale of Land to occupying Tenants in Ireland.
Evidence by Commission Act 1885 (repealed)	48 & 49 Vict. c. 74	14 August 1885
An Act to amend the Law relating to taking Evidence by Commission in India and the Colonies, and elsewhere in Her Majesty's Dominions. (Repealed by Evidence (Proceedings in other Jurisdictions) Act 1975 (c. 34))
Prevention of Crimes Amendment Act 1885 (repealed)	48 & 49 Vict. c. 75	14 August 1885
An Act to amend the Prevention of Crimes Act, 1871. (Note: Prevention of Crimes Act 1871 (34 & 35 Vict. c. 112)) (Repealed for Scotland by Police (Scotland) Act 1956 (4 & 5 Eliz. 2. c. 26) and for England and Wales by Police Act 1964 (c. 48))
Thames Preservation Act 1885 (repealed)	48 & 49 Vict. c. 76	14 August 1885
An Act for the preservation of the River Thames above Teddington Lock for purposes of public recreation, and for regulating the pleasure traffic thereon. (Repealed by Thames Conservancy Act 1894 (57 & 58 Vict. c. clxxxvii))
Labourers (Ireland) Act 1885 (repealed)	48 & 49 Vict. c. 77	14 August 1885
An Act to amend the Labourers (Ireland) Act, 1883, (Note: Labourers (Ireland) Act 1883 (46 & 47 Vict. c. 60)) and for other purposes connected with Labourers Dwellings in Ireland. (Repealed by Statute Law Revision Act (Northern Ireland) 1954 (c. 35 (N.I.)))
Educational Endowments (Ireland) Act 1885	48 & 49 Vict. c. 78	14 August 1885
An Act to re-organize the Educational Endowments of Ireland.
Crown Lands Act 1885 (repealed)	48 & 49 Vict. c. 79	14 August 1885
An Act to amend the Law relating to the management of the Woods, Forests, and Land Revenues of the Crown. (Repealed by Statute Law Revision Act 1898 (61 & 62 Vict. c. 22), Crown Lands Act 1927 (17 & 18 Geo. 5. c. 23), Statute Law Revision Act 1953 (2 & 3 Eliz. 2. c. 5) and Crown Estate Act 1961 (9 & 10 Eliz. 2. c. 55))
Union Officers (Ireland) Act 1885	48 & 49 Vict. c. 80	14 August 1885
An Act for enabling Allowances to be made to the Officers of Poor Law Unions in Ireland, on abolition of Office.

=== Local acts ===
Short title	Citation	Royal assent
Long title
Local Government Board's Provisional Orders Confirmation Act 1885	48 & 49 Vict. c. i	28 April 1885
An Act to confirm certain Provisional Orders of the Local Government Board relating to the Boroughs of Bolton and Honiton, the Improvement Act Districts of Mansfield and Milford, and the Borough of Stockton.
	Bolton Order 1885 Provisional Order for altering the Bolton Improvement Act, 1877. (Note: Bolton Improvement Act 1877 (40 & 41 Vict. c. clxxxviii))	
	Honiton Order 1885 Provisional Order for partially repealing, altering, and amending a Local Act. (Note: Honiton Improvement Act 1790 (30 Geo. 3. c. 25))	
	Mansfield Order 1885 Provisional Order for altering and amending the Mansfield Commissioners Gas Act, 1878. (Note: Mansfield Commissioners Gas Act 1878 (41 & 42 Vict. c. cxcvii))	
	Milford Order 1885 Provisional Order for altering and amending the Milford Improvement Act, 1857. (Note: Milford Improvement Act 1857 (20 & 21 Vict. c. lxxiv))	
	Stockton Order 1885 Provisional Order for altering and amending the Stockton Gas Act, 1857, (Note: Stockton Gas Act 1857 (20 & 21 Vict. c. lii)) and the Stockton Gas Act, 1873. (Note: Stockton Gas Act 1873 (36 & 37 Vict. c. lxvii))	
Local Government Board's Provisional Orders Confirmation (Poor Law) Act 1885	48 & 49 Vict. c. ii	28 April 1885
An Act to confirm certain Orders of the Local Government Board under the provisions of the Divided Parishes and Poor Law Amendment Act, 1876, (Note: Divided Parishes and Poor Law Amendment Act 1876 (39 & 40 Vict. c. 61)) as amended and extended by the Poor Law Act, 1879, (Note: Poor Law Act 1879 (42 & 43 Vict. c. 54)) relating to the Parishes of Corwen, Dolbenmaen, Ewenny, Gwyddelwern Llanfihangel-y-Pennant, Llangar, Llanharan, Llanilid, Mathern, Penmorfa, St. Bride's Major, Saint Pierre and Runstone, and Yspytty Ystwith; and to the Township of Lower Gwnnws.
	Ewenny and Saint Bride's Major Order 1885 Bridgend and Cowbridge Union.	
	Llanharan and Llanilid Order 1885 Bridgend and Cowbridge Union.	
	Mathern and Saint Pierre and Runstone Order 1885 Chepstow Union.	
	Corwen, Gwyddelwern, and Llangar Order 1885 Corwen Union.	
	Dolbenmaen, Llanfihangel y Pennant, and Penmorfa Order 1885 Festiniog Union.	
	Lower Gwnnws and Yspytty Ystwith Order 1885 Tregaron Union.	
Eastern and Midlands Railway Act 1885	48 & 49 Vict. c. iii	28 April 1885
An Act to confer further Powers on the Eastern and Midlands Railway Company.
Drainage and Improvement of Lands Supplemental (Ireland) Act 1885	48 & 49 Vict. c. iv	21 May 1885
An Act to confirm certain Provisional Orders under the Drainage and Improvement of Lands (Ireland) Act, 1863, (Note: Drainage and Improvement of Lands (Ireland) Act 1863 (26 & 27 Vict. c. 88)) and the Acts amending the same, relating to the Upper Morning Star Drainage District, county Limerick, and the Cashen River Drainage District, county Kerry.
	In the matter of the Upper Morning Star Drainage District, in the county of Limerick.	
	In the matter of the Cashen River Drainage District, in the County of Kerry.	
Local Government Board's Provisional Orders Confirmation (Poor Law) (No. 2) Act 1885	48 & 49 Vict. c. v	21 May 1885
An Act to confirm certain Orders of the Local Government Board under the Provisions of the Divided Parishes and Poor Law Amendment Act, 1876, as amended and extended by the Poor Law Act, 1879, relating to the Parishes of Aller, Barrington, Berecrocombe, Camerton, Curry Mallet, Curry Rivall, Drayton, Dunkerton, Earnshill, Fivehead, High Ham, Huish Episcopi, Isle Abbots, Isle Brewers, Kingsbury Episcopi, Kingsdon, Long Sutton, North and Mid Littleton, Pitney, Puckington, Somerton, South Littleton, and Swell.
	Camerton and Dunkerton Order 1885 Bath and Clutton Unions.	
	North and Mid Littleton and South Littleton Order 1885 Evesham Union.	
	Aller, &c. Order 1885 Langport Union.	
Local Government Board's Provisional Orders Confirmation (Poor Law) (No. 3) Act 1885	48 & 49 Vict. c. vi	21 May 1885
An Act to confirm certain Orders of the Local Government Board under the provisions of the Divided Parishes and Poor Law Amendment Act, 1876, as amended and extended by the Poor Law Act, 1879, relating to the Parishes of Ashcot, Bridgewater, Cannington, Chedzoy, Chilton Trinity, Durleigh, Etchingham (two), Fiddington, Goathurst, Grointon, Hawkhurst (two), Huntspill, Lyng, Middlezoy, Mountfield, Nether Stowey, North Petherton, Othery, Otterhampton, Overstowey, Sandhurst, Shapwick, Stockland Bristol, Wembdon, Western Zoyland, and Woollavington; and to the Hamlet of Edstock and Beer.
	Etchingham, Hawkhurst, Mountfield, and Sandhurst Order 1885 Battle, Cranbrook, and Ticehurst Unions.	
	Ashcot, &c. Order 1885 Bridgewater Union.	
	Etchingham and Hawkhurst Order 1885 Cranbrook and Ticehurst Unions.	
Local Government Board's Provisional Orders Confirmation (Poor Law) (No. 5) Act 1885	48 & 49 Vict. c. vii	21 May 1885
An Act to confirm certain Orders of the Local Government Board under the provisions of the Divided Parishes and Poor Law Amendment Act, 1876, as amended and extended by the Poor Law Act, 1879, relating to the Parishes of Bidborough, Bridgewater, Chilton Trinity, Compton Greenfield, Durleigh, Henbury, Middlezoy, North Petherton, Tonbridge, Wembdon, and Weston Zoyland.
	Compton Greenfield, and Henbury Order 1885 Barton Regis Union.	
	Bridgewater, &c. Order 1885 Bridgewater Union.	
	Bidborough and Tonbridge Order 1885 Tonbridge Union.	
Local Government Board's Provisional Orders Confirmation (Poor Law) (No. 6) Act 1885	48 & 49 Vict. c. viii	21 May 1885
An Act to confirm certain Orders of the Local Government Board under the provisions of the Divided Parishes and Poor Law Amendment Act, 1876, as amended and extended by the Poor Law Act, 1879, and the Divided Parishes and Poor Law Amendment Act, 1882, (Note: Divided Parishes and Poor Law Amendment Act 1882 (45 & 46 Vict. c. 58)) relating to the Parishes of Escombe and Newton Solney; to the Townships of Barton-under-Needwood, Bearwardcote. Bishop Auckland, Burton-Extra, Burton-upon-Trent, Castle Gresley, Chester-le-Street, Church Gresley, Counden, Counden Grange, Dunstall, Edmondsley, Etwall, Hominglow, Lanchester, Pollard's Lands, Tatenhill, and Urpeth; and to the Chapelries of Bradley alias Bretby, and Tanfield.
	Bishop Auckland, &c. Order 1885 Auckland Union	
	Barton-under-Needwood, &c. Order 1885 Burton-upon-Trent Union.	
	Chester-le-Street, Edmondsley, and Lanchester Order 1885 Chester-le-Street and Lanchester Unions.	
	Tanfield and Urpeth Order 1885 Chester-le-Street and Lanchester Unions.	
Local Government Board's Provisional Orders Confirmation (Poor Law) (No. 7) Act 1885	48 & 49 Vict. c. ix	21 May 1885
An Act to confirm certain Orders of the Local Government Board under the provisions of the Divided Parishes and Poor Law Amendment Act, 1876, as amended and extended by the Poor Law Act, 1879, relating to the Parish of Cardeston; and to the Townships of Alderbury, Bauseley, Cwm Rheidol, and Llanbadarn-y-Croyddin Upper.
	Cwm Rheidol and Llanbadarn y Croyddin Upper Order 1885 Aberystwith Union.	
	Alberbury, Bauseley, and Cardeston Order 1885 Atcham Union.	
Local Government Board (Ireland) Provisional Orders Confirmation (No. 1) Act 1885	48 & 49 Vict. c. x	21 May 1885
An Act to confirm certain Provisional Orders of the Local Government Board for Ireland under the Labourers (Ireland) Act, 1883, (Note: Labourers (Ireland) Act 1883 (46 & 47 Vict. c. 60)) relating to the Dunshaughlin and Manorhamilton Unions, and to the Town of Trim.
	Dunshaughlin Union Labourers Order 1885 Provisional Order in pursuance of the Labourers (Ireland) Act, 1883, authorising the purchase and taking of Land otherwise than by agreement.	
	Manorhamilton Union Labourers Order 1885 Provisional Order in pursuance of the Labourers (Ireland) Act, 1883, authorising the purchase and taking of Land otherwise than by agreement.	
	Trim Provisional Order 1885 Provisional Order.	
Local Government Board's Provisional Orders Confirmation (No. 2) Act 1885	48 & 49 Vict. c. xi	21 May 1885
An Act to confirm certain Provisional Orders of the Local Government Board relating to the Accrington and Church Outfall Sewerage District, the Improvement Act District of Cambridge, the Local Government District of Ely, the Improvement Act Districts of Leek and Middleton-and-Tonge, and the Local Government Districts of Toxteth Park and Wimbledon.
	Accrington and Church Order 1885 Provisional Order to enable the Accrington and Church Outfall Sewerage Board to put in force the Compulsory Clauses of the Lands Clauses Consolidation Acts.	
	Cambridge Order 1885 Provisional Order to enable the Sanitary Authority for the Urban Sanitary District of Cambridge to put in force the Compulsory Clauses of the Lands Clauses Consolidation Acts.	
	Ely Order 1885 Provisional Order to enable the Sanitary Authority for the Urban Sanitary District of Ely to put in force the Compulsory Clauses of the Lands Clauses Consolidation Acts.	
	Leek Order 1885 Provisional Order to enable the Sanitary Authority for the Urban Sanitary District of Leek to put in force the Compulsory Clauses of the Lands Clauses Consolidation Acts.	
	Middleton and Tonge Order 1885 Provisional Order to enable the Sanitary Authority for the Urban Sanitary District of Middleton and Tonge to put in force the Compulsory Clauses of the Lands Clauses Consolidation Acts.	
	Toxteth Park Order 1885 Provisional Order to enable the Sanitary Authority for the Urban Sanitary District of Toxteth Park to put in force the Compulsory Clauses of the Lands Clauses Consolidation Acts.	
	Wimbledon Order 1885 Provisional Order to enable the Sanitary Authority for the Urban Sanitary District of Wimbledon to put in force the Compulsory Clauses of the Lands Clauses Consolidation Acts.	
Oyster and Mussel Fisheries Order Confirmation Act 1885	48 & 49 Vict. c. xii	21 May 1885
An Act to confirm an Order made by the Board of Trade under the Sea Fisheries Act, 1868, (Note: Sea Fisheries Act 1868 (31 & 32 Vict. c. 45)) relating to Poole.
	Poole Fishery Order 1885 Order for the regulation by the Corporation of the Borough of Poole of an Oyster and Mussel Fishery in part of the Harbour of Poole, in the County of Dorset.	
Runcorn Gas Act 1885	48 & 49 Vict. c. xiii	21 May 1885
An Act to enable the Runcorn Gas Company to raise additional capital; to construct new works; and for other purposes.
Skipton and Kettlewell Railway (Abandonment) Act 1885 (repealed)	48 & 49 Vict. c. xiv	21 May 1885
An Act for the abandonment of the Railway authorised by the Skipton and Kettlewell Railway Act, 1880. (Note: Skipton and Kettlewell Railway Act 1880 (43 & 44 Vict. c. cci)) (Repealed by Statute Law (Repeals) Act 2013 (c. 2))
Glasgow Police Act 1885 (repealed)	48 & 49 Vict. c. xv	21 May 1885
An Act to enable the Magistrates and Council of the City and Royal Burgh of Glasgow, acting as the Police Commissioners, to borrow further Money; and for other purposes. (Repealed by Statute Law (Repeals) Act 1995 (c. 44))
Newark Cattle Markets and Fairs Act 1885	48 & 49 Vict. c. xvi	21 May 1885
An Act to incorporate a Company for establishing and holding Markets and Fairs for Horses and Cattle at or near Newark in the County of Nottingham; and for other purposes.
Port Glasgow Harbour Act 1885 (repealed)	48 & 49 Vict. c. xvii	21 May 1885
An Act for enabling the Trustees of Port Glasgow Harbour to borrow additional Money; and for other purposes. (Repealed by Port Glasgow Burgh and Harbour Order Confirmation Act 1939 (2 & 3 Geo. 6. c. lxix))
Auld's Patent Act 1885	48 & 49 Vict. c. xviii	21 May 1885
An Act for rendering valid certain Letters Patent granted to William Wallace Auld for Improvements in the Preparation and Combination of Animal Substances for Use as Food.
Blackburn Water Act 1885	48 & 49 Vict. c. xix	21 May 1885
An Act to enable the Mayor Aldermen and Burgesses of the Borough of Blackburn to abandon the Construction of the Dunsop Compensation Reservoir and to extend the time for the Construction of authorised Waterworks and for other purposes.
Rickmansworth and Uxbridge Valley Water Act 1885	48 & 49 Vict. c. xx	21 May 1885
An Act for extending the Limits of supply of the Rickmansworth Waterworks Company to change the Name of the Company and for other purposes.
Tilbury and Gravesend Tunnel Junction Railway (Abandonment) Act 1885 (repealed)	48 & 49 Vict. c. xxi	21 May 1885
An Act for the abandonment of the Tilbury and Gravesend Tunnel Junction Railway. (Repealed by Statute Law (Repeals) Act 2013 (c. 2))
Ashton-under-Lyne Stalybridge and Dukinfield (District) Waterworks Act 1885 (repealed)	48 & 49 Vict. c. xxii	21 May 1885
An Act to confer further Powers on the Ashton-under-Lyne Stalybridge and Dukinfield (District) Waterworks Joint Committee. (Repealed by West Pennine Water Order 1968 (SI 1968/512))
London, Chatham and Dover Railway (Capital) Act 1885	48 & 49 Vict. c. xxiii	21 May 1885
An Act to enable the London Chatham and Dover Railway Company to raise further Capital and for other purposes.
Oxford (Corporation) Waterworks Act 1885	48 & 49 Vict. c. xxiv	21 May 1885
An Act to extend the Powers of the Mayor Aldermen and Citizens of Oxford with respect to their supply of Water and for other purposes.
East and West India Dock Company's Act 1885 (repealed)	48 & 49 Vict. c. xxv	21 May 1885
An Act to authorise the East and West India Dock Company to raise by capital stock or to borrow on mortgage, or by redeemable debenture stock, the moneys which they are authorised to raise by their Act of 1882, (Note: East and West India Dock Company's Extension Act 1882 (45 & 46 Vict. c. xc)) and which have not yet been raised. (Repealed by Port of London (Consolidation) Act 1920 (10 & 11 Geo. 5. c. clxxiii))
North Metropolitan Tramways Act 1885	48 & 49 Vict. c. xxvi	21 May 1885
An Act for empowering the North Metropolitan Tramways Company to construct new Tramways along Clerkenwell Road; and for other purposes.
Waterford, Dungarvan and Lismore Railway Extension (Abandonment) Act 1885	48 & 49 Vict. c. xxvii	21 May 1885
An Act for the abandonment of the Extension Railway authorised by the Waterford Dungarvan and Lismore Railway (Extension) Act, 1878, (Note: Waterford Dungarvan and Lismore Railway (Extension) Act 1878 (41 & 42 Vict. c. ccvi)) and for other purposes.
East Surrey Water Act 1885	48 & 49 Vict. c. xxviii	21 May 1885
An Act to extend the District of the Caterham Spring Water Company to change their Name to authorise the company to raise additional Capital and for other purposes.
Local Government Board (Ireland) Provisional Orders Confirmation (No. 2) Act 1885	48 & 49 Vict. c. xxix	25 June 1885
An Act to confirm certain Provisional Orders of the Local Government Board for Ireland under the Labourers (Ireland) Act, 1883, relating to the Dundalk, Mallow, and Trim Unions.
	Dundalk Union Labourers Order 1885 Provisional Order in pursuance of the Labourers (Ireland) Act, 1883, authorising the purchase and taking of Land otherwise than by agreement.	
	Trim Union Labourers Order 1885 Provisional Order in pursuance of the Labourers (Ireland) Act, 1883, authorising the purchase and taking of Land otherwise than by agreement.	
Tramways (Ireland) Provisional Order (Mitchelstown and Fermoy) Confirmation Act 1885	48 & 49 Vict. c. xxx	25 June 1885
An Act to confirm a Provisional Order of the Lord Lieutenant and Privy Council in Ireland relating to the Mitchelstown and Fermoy Light Railway.
	Mitchelstown and Fermoy Light Railway Order 1885 The Mitchelstown and Fermoy Light Railway Order, 1885.	
Local Government Board's Provisional Orders Confirmation (Poor Law) (No. 4) Act 1885	48 & 49 Vict. c. xxxi	25 June 1885
An Act to confirm certain Orders of the Local Government Board under the provisions of the Divided Parishes and Poor Law Amendment Act, 1876, as amended and extended by the Poor Law Act, 1879, relating to the Parishes of Great Ryburgh, Kirk Sandall, Saint Giles, Saint Peter, Sawtry All Saints, Sawtry Saint Andrew, Stainton-with-Hellaby, Stibbard, and Wadworth; and to the Townships of Long Sandall and Stancil-with-Wellingley-and-Wilsick.
	Saint Giles and Saint Peter Order 1885 Cambridge Union.	
	Kirk Sandall and Long Sandall Order 1885 Doncaster Union.	
	Stainton-with-Hellaby, &c. Order 1885 Doncaster Union	
	Sawtry All Saints, &c. Order 1885 Huntingdon Union.	
	Great Ryburgh and Stibbard Order 1885 Walsingham Union.	
Local Government Board (Ireland) Provisional Orders Confirmation (Labourers) (No. 3) Act 1885	48 & 49 Vict. c. xxxii	25 June 1885
An Act to confirm certain Provisional Orders of the Local Government Board for Ireland under the Labourers (Ireland) Act, 1883, relating to the Ballymahon, Carrick-on-Shannon, Enniscorthy, Gorey, Kanturk, Longford, Wexford, and Youghal Unions.
	Ballymahon Union Labourers Order 1885 Provisional Order in pursuance of the Labourers (Ireland) Act, 1883, authorising the purchase and taking of Land otherwise than by agreement.	
	Carrick-on-Shannon Union Labourers Order 1885 Provisional Order in pursuance of the Labourers (Ireland) Act, 1883, authorising the purchase and taking of Land otherwise than by agreement.	
	Enniscorthy Union Labourers Order 1885 Provisional Order in pursuance of the Labourers (Ireland) Act, 1883, authorising the purchase and taking of Land otherwise than by agreement.	
	Gorey Union Labourers Order 1885 Provisional Order in pursuance of the Labourers (Ireland) Act, 1883, authorising the purchase and taking of Land otherwise than by agreement.	
	Kanturk Union Labourers Order 1885 Provisional Order in pursuance of the Labourers (Ireland) Act, 1883, authorising the purchase and taking of Land otherwise than by agreement.	
	Longford Union Labourers Order 1885 Provisional Order in pursuance of the Labourers (Ireland) Act, 1883, authorising the purchase and taking of Land otherwise than by agreement.	
	Wexford Union Labourers Order 1885 Provisional Order in pursuance of the Labourers (Ireland) Act, 1883, authorising the purchase and taking of Land otherwise than by agreement.	
	Youghal Union Labourers Order 1885 Provisional Order in pursuance of the Labourers (Ireland) Act, 1883, authorising the purchase and taking of Land otherwise than by agreement.	
Liverpool Grain Storage and Transit Company (Delivery Warrants) Act 1885	48 & 49 Vict. c. xxxiii	25 June 1885
An Act to enable the Liverpool Grain Storage and Transit Company Limited to issue transferable certificates and warrants for the delivery of goods and for other purposes.
Central Argentine Railway Company Act 1885	48 & 49 Vict. c. xxxiv	25 June 1885
An Act for amending and explaining the Memorandum and Articles of Association of the Central Argentine Railway Company Limited; for extending its powers; and for other purposes.
Fulwood Local Board Act 1885 (repealed)	48 & 49 Vict. c. xxxv	25 June 1885
An Act to sanction and confirm the construction by the Fulwood Local Board of the Horns Dam Reservoir and other Works in the Township of Goosnargh-with-Newsham and in the Township of Haighton; to authorise the Local Board to acquire certain Properties; to take Land for Sewage purposes; to increase the number of Members of the Local Board; to borrow further Money; to authorise the Local Board to purchase by agreement a portion of the undertaking of the Preston Tramways Company; and for other purposes. (Repealed by County of Lancashire Act 1984 (c. xxi))
Albert Palace Act 1885	48 & 49 Vict. c. xxxvi	25 June 1885
An Act for confirming and giving effect to an agreement between the Commissioners of Her Majesty's Public Works and Buildings and the Albert Palace Association, Limited, and for other purposes.
Liverpool and Birkenhead Subway (Extension of Time) Act 1885	48 & 49 Vict. c. xxxvii	25 June 1885
An Act to extend and enlarge the Powers of the Liverpool and Birkenhead Subway Company; and for other purposes.
Elham Valley Railway Act 1885	48 & 49 Vict. c. xxxviii	25 June 1885
An Act to authorise the Elham Valley Light Railway Company to improve their authorised Railway and for other purposes.
North Cornwall Railway Act 1885	48 & 49 Vict. c. xxxix	25 June 1885
An Act to extend the Powers of the North Cornwall Railway Company.
Airdrie Burgh Extension Act 1885 (repealed)	48 & 49 Vict. c. xl	25 June 1885
An Act for extending the Municipal and Police Boundaries of the Burgh of Airdrie and for other purposes. (Repealed by Airdrie Corporation Order Confirmation Act 1951 (14 & 15 Geo. 6. c. xiii))
Coatbridge Burgh Act 1885	48 & 49 Vict. c. xli	25 June 1885
An Act for erecting Coatbridge, in the county of Lanark, into a Burgh; and for other purposes.
Maidstone Waterworks Act 1885	48 & 49 Vict. c. xlii	25 June 1885
An Act to enable the Maidstone Waterworks Company to construct additional Works and raise additional Capital; and for other purposes.
Oswestry (Corporation) Water and Markets Act 1885	48 & 49 Vict. c. xliii	25 June 1885
An Act to empower the Mayor Aldermen and Burgesses of the Borough of Oswestry to make and maintain additional Waterworks; to make other provisions in relation to their Waterwork Undertaking; to borrow Money; and for the revision of the Market Tolls; and for other purposes.
Dore and Chinley Railway Act 1885	48 & 49 Vict. c. xliv	25 June 1885
An Act to empower the Dore and Chinley Railway Company to make a new Railway to deviate part of their authorised Railway and to raise further Capital and for other purposes.
East London Railway Act 1885	48 & 49 Vict. c. xlv	25 June 1885
An Act to confer further Powers on the East London Railway Company and for other purposes.
Lincoln Corporation Gas Purchase Act 1885	48 & 49 Vict. c. xlvi	25 June 1885
An Act to provide for the purchase by the Corporation of the city of Lincoln of the Undertaking of the Lincoln Gaslight and Coke Company and for other purposes.
Barrington's Hospital Amendment Act 1885 (repealed)	48 & 49 Vict. c. xlvii	25 June 1885
An Act to amend an Act passed in the Eleventh Year of the Reign of His Majesty King George the Fourth entitled "An Act for the Management and Direction of the Hospital founded by Joseph Barrington and his Sons in the City of Limerick." (Note: Barrington's Hospital, Limerick Act 1830 (11 Geo. 4 & 1 Will. 4. c. lxxii)) (Repealed by Statute Law (Repeals) Act 2013 (c. 2))
Llangammarch and Neath and Brecon Junction Railway Act 1885 (repealed)	48 & 49 Vict. c. xlviii	25 June 1885
An Act to authorise an extension of time to the Llangammarch and Neath and Brecon Junction Railway Company for purchasing Land and completing their Railway and for other purposes. (Repealed by Llangammarch and Neath and Brecon Junction Railway (Abandonment) Act 1890 (53 & 54 Vict. c. xxvi))
London Riverside Fish Market Act 1885 (repealed)	48 & 49 Vict. c. xlix	25 June 1885
An Act to extend the time for the Purchase of Lands and for the Completion of certain Works authorised by the London River-side Fish Market Act 1882 (Note: London Riverside Fish Market Act 1882 (45 & 46 Vict. c. cxlvi)) and for other purposes. (Repealed by Statute Law (Repeals) Act 2013 (c. 2))
Woking Water and Gas Act 1885	48 & 49 Vict. c. l	25 June 1885
An Act for extending the Limits of Supply of Water of the Woking Water and Gas Company and for authorising that Company to raise further Moneys and for other purposes.
Liverpool Cathedral Act 1885	48 & 49 Vict. c. li	25 June 1885
An Act to authorise and facilitate the Erection of a Cathedral Church for the Diocese of Liverpool on the site of Saint John's Church in the parish of Liverpool, and to make other provisions relative thereto; to provide for the foundation of a Dean and Chapter of Liverpool; and for other purposes.
Ward's City of London School for Girls Act 1885	48 & 49 Vict. c. lii	25 June 1885
An Act for enabling the Mayor and Commonalty and Citizens of the City of London to acquire a Site for the High School for Girls to be established in the city of London under the will of the late William Ward and for other purposes.
Southport and Cheshire Lines Extension Railway Act 1885	48 & 49 Vict. c. liii	25 June 1885
An Act to empower the Southport and Cheshire Lines Extension Railway Company to raise further Money; to confirm Agreements with reference to the working of their Railway by the Cheshire Lines Committee; and for other purposes.
Isle of Axholme Railway Act 1885 (repealed)	48 & 49 Vict. c. liv	25 June 1885
An Act for authorising the Construction of Railways in the Isle of Axholme in the county of Lincoln to be called the Isle of Axholme Railway and for other purposes. (Repealed by Isle of Axholme Railway (Abandonment) Act 1888 (51 & 52 Vict. c. viii))
Gas Orders Confirmation (No. 1) Act 1885	48 & 49 Vict. c. lv	16 July 1885
An Act to confirm certain Provisional Orders made by the Board of Trade under the Gas and Water Works Facilities Act, 1870, (Note: Gas and Water Works Facilities Act 1870 (33 & 34 Vict. c. 70)) relating to Dover Gas, Grays Gas, Middlewich Gas, Rickmansworth Gas, and Shelley and Shepley Gas.
	Dover Gas Order 1885 Order empowering the Dovor Gaslight Company to purchase additional land and to construct additional works.	
	Grays Gas Order 1885 Order empowering the Grays Gas Company (Limited) to extend their limits of supply to the Parishes of Chadwell St. Mary, West Tilbury, and East Tilbury, in the County of Essex, and to increase their capital.	
	Middlewich Gas Order 1885 Order empowering the Middlewich Gaslight and Coke Company (Limited) to maintain. and continue gasworks, and to make and supply gas in the townships of Middlewich, Kindertoncum-Hulme, Sproston, Newton, Sutton, Croxton, and Ravenscroft, in the parish of Middlewich, and the township of Stanthorne, in the parish of Davenham, all in the county of Chester.	
	Rickmansworth Gas Order 1885 Order empowering the Rickmansworth Gaslight and Coke Company (Limited) to maintain and continue their Gasworks at Rickmansworth in the County of Hertford, and to make and supply Gas in the Parish of Rickmansworth in the said County.	
	Shelley and Shepley Gas Order 1885 Order empowering the Shelley and Shepley Gaslight Company (Limited) to maintain and continue Gasworks, and to make and supply Gas in the Township of Shepley and certain parts of the Townships of Shelley, Cumberworth, and Denby, all in the West Riding of the County of York.	
Commons Regulation (Ashdown Forest) Provisional Order Confirmation Act 1885	48 & 49 Vict. c. lvi	16 July 1885
An Act to confirm the Provisional Order for the Regulation of Ashdown Forest, situate in the parishes of East Grinstead, Hartfield, Withyham, Buxted, Maresfield, and Fletching, in the county of Sussex, in pursuance of a report of the Land Commissioners for England.
	Ashdown Forest Order 1885 Provisional Order for the Regulation of a Сommon.	
Commons Regulation (Drumburgh) Provisional Order Confirmation Act 1885	48 & 49 Vict. c. lvii	16 July 1885
An Act to confirm the Provisional Order for the Regulation of Drumburgh Common and Moss, situate in the township of Drumburgh, in the parish of Bowness, in the county of Cumberland, in pursuance of a Report of the Land Commissioners for England.
	Drumburgh Order 1885 Provisional Order for the Regulation of a Common.	
Inclosure (Llanybyther) Provisional Order Confirmation Act 1885	48 & 49 Vict. c. lviii	16 July 1885
An Act to confirm the Provisional Order for the Inclosure of Llanybyther Common, situate in the parish of Llanybyther, in the county of Carmarthen, m pursuance of a Report of the Land Commissioners for England.
	Llanybyther Order 1885 Provisional Order for the Inclosure of a Common.	
Local Government Board's (Gas) Provisional Orders Confirmation Act 1885	48 & 49 Vict. c. lix	16 July 1885
An Act to confirm certain Provisional Orders of the Local Government Board under the provisions of the Gas and Water Works Facilities Act, 1870, and the Public Health Act, 1875, (Note: Public Health Act 1875 (38 & 39 Vict. c. 55)) relating to the Local Government Districts of East Dereham, Ellesmere, and Haverhill.
	East Dereham Gas Order 1885 Provisional Order under the Gas and Water Works Facilities Act, 1870.	
	Ellesmere Gas Order 1885 Provisional Order under the Gas and Water Works Facilities Act, 1870.	
	Haverhill Gas Order 1885 Provisional Order under the Gas and Water Works Facilities Act, 1870.	
Local Government Board (Ireland) Provisional Orders Confirmation (Bandon, Ennis and New Ross) Act 1885	48 & 49 Vict. c. lx	16 July 1885
An Act to confirm certain Provisional Orders of the Local Government Board for Ireland under the Labourers (Ireland) Act, 1883, relating to the Bandon, Ennis, and New Ross Unions.
	Bandon Union Labourers Order 1885 Provisional Order in pursuance of the Labourers (Ireland) Act, 1883, authorising the purchase and taking of Land otherwise than by agreement.	
	Ennis Union Labourers Order 1885 Provisional Order in pursuance of the Labourers (Ireland) Act, 1883, authorising the purchase and taking of Land otherwise than by agreement.	
	New Ross Union Labourers Order 1885 Provisional Order in pursuance of the Labourers (Ireland) Act, 1883, authorising the purchase and taking of Land otherwise than by agreement.	
Local Government Board (Ireland) Provisional Orders Confirmation (Mallow and Midleton) Act 1885	48 & 49 Vict. c. lxi	16 July 1885
An Act to confirm certain Provisional Orders of the Local Government Board for Ireland concerning Mallow and Midleton.
	Mallow Burial Ground Provisional Order 1885 Mallow Burial Ground. Provisional Order.	
	Midleton Waterworks Provisional Order 1885 Midleton Waterworks. Provisional Order .	
Local Government Board's Provisional Orders Confirmation (No. 5) Act 1885	48 & 49 Vict. c. lxii	16 July 1885
An Act to confirm certain Provisional Orders of the Local Government Board relating to the Special Drainage District of Brackley, the District of Bromsgrove, the Boroughs of Darlington and Stafford, the Local Government Districts of Ulverston, Warminster, and West Ham, and the Borough of Wigan.
	Brackley Order 1885 Provisional Order for dissolving the Special Drainage District of Brackley; and for other purposes.	
	Bromsgrove Order 1885 Provisional Order for partially repealing, altering, and amending a Local Act (Note: Bromsgrove Improvement and Small Tenements Act 1846 (9 & 10 Vict. c. cxxiv)) and certain Confirming Acts. (Note: Local Government Supplemental Act 1861 (24 & 25 Vict. c. 39)) (Note: Local Government Supplemental Act 1863 (26 & 27 Vict. c. 32)) (Note: Local Government Supplemental Act 1865 (No. 2) (28 & 29 Vict. c. 25)) (Note: Local Government Board's Provisional Orders Confirmation (Abergavenny, &c.) Act 1880 (43 & 44 Vict. c. lviii))	
	Darlington Order 1885 Provisional Order for altering the Darlington Extension and Improvement Act, 1872. (Note: Darlington Extension and Improvement Act 1872 (35 & 36 Vict. c. cxii))	
	Stafford Order 1885 Provisional Order for partially repealing and altering certain Local Acts. (Note: Stafford Corporation Act 1876 (39 & 40 Vict. c. cxcvi)) (Note: Stafford Corporation Act 1880 (43 & 44 Vict. c. lxxiii))	
	Ulverston Order 1885 Provisional Order for altering a Local Act. (Note: Ulverston Local Board Act 1874 (37 & 38 Vict. c. cliv))	
	Warminster Order 1885 Provisional Order for altering the area of the Local Government District of Warminster.	
	West Ham Order 1885 Provisional Order for altering a Confirming Act. (Note: Local Government Board's Provisional Orders Confirmation (No. 5) Act 1883 (46 & 47 Vict. c. cxxxvi))	
	Wigan Order 1885 Provisional Order for altering certain Local Acts. (Note: Wigan Improvement Act 1874 (37 & 38 Vict. c. cxxiv)) (Note: Wigan Improvement Act 1880 (43 & 44 Vict. c. cxxvii))	
Drainage and Improvement of Lands Supplemental (Ireland) (No. 2) Act 1885	48 & 49 Vict. c. lxiii	16 July 1885
An Act to confirm a Provisional Order under the Drainage and Improvement of Lands (Ireland) Act, 1863, and the Acts amending the same, relating to the Ballyteigue and Kilmore Drainage District, in the County of Wexford.
	Ballyteigue and Kilmore Order 1885 In the matter of the Ballyteigue and Kilmore Drainage District, in the county Wexford.	
Gas and Water Orders Confirmation (No. 2) Act 1885	48 & 49 Vict. c. lxiv	16 July 1885
An Act to confirm certain Provisional Orders made by the Board of Trade under the Gas and Water Works Facilities Act, 1870, relating to Chelmsford Gas, Great Grimsby Gas, Clacton-on-Sea Gas and Water, and Cwm Avon Gas and Water.
	Chelmsford Gas Order 1885 Order empowering the Chelmsford Gaslight and Coke Company to raise additional Capital, and to construct additional Works in the Parish of Springfield, in the County of Essex.	
	Great Grimsby Gas Order 1885 Order empowering the Great Grimsby Gas Company to raise additional Capital.	
	Clacton-on-Sea Gas and Water Order 1885 Order empowering the Clacton-on-Sea Gas and Water Company (Limited) to raise Additional Capital, and for other purposes.	
	Cwm Avon Gas and Water Order 1885 Order conferring powers for the maintenance and continuance of Gasworks and Waterworks, for the manufacture and supply of Gas, and for the supply of Water within the Hamlet of Cwm Avon, in the Parish of Michaelston-super-Avon, in the County of Glamorgan.	
Water Orders Confirmation Act 1885	48 & 49 Vict. c. lxv	16 July 1885
An Act to confirm certain Provisional Orders made by the Board of Trade under the Gas and Water Works Facilities Act, 1870, relating to Barton-upon-Humber and District Water, Chiltern Hills Spring Water, Great Berkhampstead Water, Herts and Essex Water, and Holyhead Water.
	Barton-upon-Humber and District Water Order 1885 Order authorising the construction and maintenance of Waterworks and the supply of Water in the Parishes or Places of Barton-upon-Humber, Barrow, New Holland, and Goxhill, in the parts of Lindsey in the County of Lincoln.	
	Chiltern Hills Spring Water Order 1885 Order empowering the Chiltern Hills Spring Water Company to raise additional Capital.	
	Great Berkhampstead Water Order 1885 Order authorising the maintenance and continuance of Waterworks and the supply of Water in and to the Parishes of Berkhampstead St. Peter, and Berkhampstead St. Mary, otherwise Northchurch, and part of the Parishes of Great Gaddesden, Little Gaddesden, and Hemel Hempsted, in the County of Hertford, and of Eddlesborough, Chesham, Ivinghoe, and Pitstone, in the County of Buckingham.	
	Herts and Essex Water Order 1885 Order empowering the Herts and Essex Waterworks Company (Limited) to maintain and continue Waterworks and to raise additional Capital.	
	Holyhead Water Order 1885 Order empowering the Holyhead Waterworks Company to construct additional Waterworks in the Parish of Holyhead, in the County of Anglesey, and to raise additional Capital.	
Tramways Orders Confirmation (No. 1) Act 1885	48 & 49 Vict. c. lxvi	16 July 1885
An Act to confirm certain Provisional Orders made by the Board of Trade under the Tramways Act, 1870, (Note: Tramways Act 1870 (33 & 34 Vict. c. 78)) relating to Bradford and Shelf Tramways, Cardiff District and Penarth Harbour Tramways (Extensions), Cardiff Tramways (Extensions), Shipley Tramways, Tynemouth and District Tramways, and Worcester Tramways.
	Bradford and Shelf Tramways Order 1885 Order authorising the construction of Tramways in the Borough of Bradford, and in the Parishes of Bradford and Halifax, all in the West Riding of the County of York.	
	Cardiff District and Penarth Harbour Tramways (Extensions) Order 1885 Order authorising the Construction of additional Tramways in the Borough of Cardiff, in the County of Glamorgan.	
	Cardiff Tramways (Extensions) Order 1885 Order authorising the Cardiff Tramways Company (Limited) to construct additional Tramways in the Borough of Cardiff and County of Glamorgan.	
	Shipley Tramways Order 1885 Order authorising the alteration of the gauge of certain existing Tramways and the construction of additional Tramways in the District or Township of Shipley, in the Parish of Bradford, in the West Riding of the County of York.	
	Tynemouth and District Tramways (Release of Deposit) Order 1885 Order authorising the Release of the Balance of the Deposit Fund paid into Court on the Application for the Tynemouth and District Tramways Order, 1879.	
	Worcester Tramways Order 1881 Amendment Order 1885 Order amending the Worcester Tramways Order, 1881, with respect to the opening for public traffic of the Tramways thereby authorised.	
London, Brighton and South Coast Railway (Various Powers) Act 1885	48 & 49 Vict. c. lxvii	16 July 1885
An Act to confer further Powers on the London Brighton and South Coast Railway Company.
Canada North West Land Company's Act 1885	48 & 49 Vict. c. lxviii	16 July 1885
An Act for granting further Powers to the Canada North-West Land Company.
Longton Corporation Act 1885 (repealed)	48 & 49 Vict. c. lxix	16 July 1885
An Act to confer further Powers on the Mayor Aldermen and Burgesses of the borough of Longton. (Repealed by Stoke-on-Trent (Gas Consolidation) Act 1922 (12 & 13 Geo. 5. c. xxii))
Northern Railway of Buenos Aires Company's Act 1885	48 & 49 Vict. c. lxx	16 July 1885
An Act to make provision with reference to the Arrears of Dividend on the Guaranteed Preference Shares in the Capital of the Northern Railway of Buenos Ayres Company Limited and for other purposes.
Charing Cross and Waterloo Electric Railway (Abandonment) Act 1885 (repealed)	48 & 49 Vict. c. lxxi	16 July 1885
An Act for the abandonment of the Railway authorised by the Charing Cross and Waterloo Electric Railway Act 1882 (Note: Charing Cross and Waterloo Electric Railway Act 1882 (45 & 46 Vict. c. cclv)) and for other purposes. (Repealed by Statute Law (Repeals) Act 2013 (c. 2))
Manchester Bury Rochdale and Oldham Steam Tramways (Extension of Time) Act 1885	48 & 49 Vict. c. lxxii	16 July 1885
An Act for extending the time for completing certain of the Tramways of the Manchester Bury Rochdale and Oldham Steam Tramways Company.
Ayr Burgh Act 1885	48 & 49 Vict. c. lxxiii	16 July 1885
An Act for extending the Municipal and Police Boundaries of the burgh of Ayr; for authorising the widening and improvement of existing Streets, the construction of additional Waterworks, and the extension of the limits of Water Supply; and for other purposes.
Columbia Market Act 1885 (repealed)	48 & 49 Vict. c. lxxiv	16 July 1885
An Act to empower the Owners of Columbia Market to make certain Railways and acquire certain lands for the convenience of the Market and for other purposes. (Repealed by Statute Law (Repeals) Act 2013 (c. 2))
Ballymena and Larne Railway Act 1885	48 & 49 Vict. c. lxxv	16 July 1885
An Act to confer further Powers on the Ballymena and Lame Railway Company.
Great Northern Railway (Various Powers) Act 1885	48 & 49 Vict. c. lxxvi	16 July 1885
An Act to confer further Powers upon the Great Northern Railway Company with respect to their Undertaking and for other purposes.
Guiseley, Yeadon and Rawdon Railway Act 1885	48 & 49 Vict. c. lxxvii	16 July 1885
An Act for incorporating the Guiseley Yeadon and Rawdon Railway Company and for other purposes.
Latimer Road and Acton Railway Act 1885 (repealed)	48 & 49 Vict. c. lxxviii	16 July 1885
An Act to extend the Powers of the Latimer Road and Acton Railway Company. (Repealed by Latimer Road and Acton Railway Act 1900 (63 & 64 Vict. c. xcv))
Cathcart District Railway (Extension of Time) Act 1885	48 & 49 Vict. c. lxxix	16 July 1885
An Act to extend the time for the completion of the Railways authorised by the Cathcart District Railway Act, 1880. (Note: Cathcart District Railway Act 1880 (43 & 44 Vict. c. ccix))
Brentford and District Tramways Act 1885 (repealed)	48 & 49 Vict. c. lxxx	16 July 1885
An Act for incorporating and conferring Powers on the Brentford and District Tramways Company. (Repealed by Brentford and District Tramways (Abandonment) Act 1890 (53 & 54 Vict. c. xvi))
Didcot, Newbury and Southampton Railway (Extension of Time) Act 1885	48 & 49 Vict. c. lxxxi	16 July 1885
An Act to extend the Powers of the Didcot Newbury and Southampton Railway Company and for other purposes.
Hull, Barnsley and West Riding Junction Railway and Dock Act 1885	48 & 49 Vict. c. lxxxii	16 July 1885
An Act to confer further Powers upon the Hull Barnsley and West Riding Junction Railway and Dock Company and to extend the time for the compulsory Purchase of Land for and for the completion of certain of their authorised works and for other purposes.
Lydd Railway (Various Powers) Act 1885	48 & 49 Vict. c. lxxxiii	16 July 1885
An Act to confer upon the Lydd Railway Company further Powers with reference to their own undertaking and for other purposes.
Manchester, Sheffield and Lincolnshire Railway (Additional Powers) Act 1885	48 & 49 Vict. c. lxxxiv	16 July 1885
An Act to authorise the Manchester Sheffield and Lincolnshire Railway Company to construct new Railways and other works and to confer further Powers upon that Company in connexion with their undertaking and for other purposes.
Rhondda and Swansea Bay Railway Act 1885	48 & 49 Vict. c. lxxxv	16 July 1885
An Act for authorising the Rhondda and Swansea Bay Railway Company to purchase additional Lands to extend the period limited by the Rhondda and Swansea Bay Railway Act 1882 (Note: Rhondda and Swansea Bay Railway Act 1882 (45 & 46 Vict. c. cci)) for the purchase of certain Lands and for other purposes.
London, Tilbury and Southend Railway Act 1885	48 & 49 Vict. c. lxxxvi	16 July 1885
An Act to confer further Powers on the London Tilbury and Southend Railway Company with respect to their own and other undertakings and with respect to their Boats. To authorise the abandonment of their authorised Junction with the Metropolitan Outer Circle Railway and for other purposes.
Lanarkshire and Ayrshire Railway Act 1885	48 & 49 Vict. c. lxxxvii	16 July 1885
An Act to grant further Powers to the Lanarkshire and Ayrshire Railway Company to enable the Caledonian Railway Company to contribute to the undertaking of that Company and for other purposes.
London and North Western Railway Act 1885	48 & 49 Vict. c. lxxxviii	16 July 1885
An Act for conferring further Powers upon the London and North-Western Railway Company in relation to their own Undertaking and other Undertakings in which they are interested jointly with other Companies and also for conferring Powers on the Great Western Railway Company Lancashire and Yorkshire Railway Company the Furness Railway Company and the Manchester Sheffield and Lincolnshire Railway Company in relation to such other Undertakings for vesting in the London, and North-Western Railway Company the Undertaking of the Lancaster Canal Navigation Company and for enabling the Manchester South Junction and Altrincham Railway Company to raise additional Capital and for other purposes.
Metropolitan Railway Act 1885	48 & 49 Vict. c. lxxxix	16 July 1885
An Act to empower the Metropolitan Railway Company to make a Branch from their authorised Aylesbury and Rickmansworth Railway to Chesham and to purchase additional lands to extend the time for the completion of their Aylesbury and Rickmansworth Railway to make further arrangements with reference to the Capital of the Company and for other purposes.
Midland Railway (Additional Powers) Act 1885	48 & 49 Vict. c. xc	16 July 1885
An Act to confer additional Powers upon the Midland Railway Company for the Construction of Works and the Acquisition of Land; for raising farther Capital and for the Consolidation of the various Classes of their Shares and Stocks; and for amalgamating with their undertaking the undertaking of the Bedford and Northampton Railway Company; and for other purposes.
Hartlepool Headland Protection and Improvement Act 1885	48 & 49 Vict. c. xci	16 July 1885
An Act to empower the Corporation of Hartlepool to construct a Sea Wall for protecting the Headland of Hartlepool in the County of Durham from the inroads of the Sea and for other purposes.
Plymouth, Devonport and South Western Junction Railway Act 1885	48 & 49 Vict. c. xcii	16 July 1885
An Act to extend the Powers of the Plymouth Devonport and South-Western Junction Railway Company.
Great Eastern Railway (General Powers) Act 1885	48 & 49 Vict. c. xciii	16 July 1885
An Act to authorise the Great Eastern Railway Company to widen and improve parts of their existing Railways in the Counties of Essex Middlesex Cambridge and Suffolk and to execute other works and to confer upon them other powers in relation to their undertaking; and for other purposes.
Lancashire and Yorkshire Railway Act 1885	48 & 49 Vict. c. xciv	16 July 1885
An Act for conferring further Powers on the Lancashire and Yorkshire Railway Company with relation to their own Undertaking and Undertakings in which they are jointly interested and for other purposes.
Liverpool Improvement Act 1885 (repealed)	48 & 49 Vict. c. xcv	16 July 1885
An Act for making further provision respecting certain Street Improvements in the City of Liverpool; and respecting the alteration of the Boundaries of the City Wards; and for other purposes. (Repealed by Liverpool Corporation Act 1921 (11 & 12 Geo. 5. c. lxxiv))
Bexhill Water and Gas Act 1885	48 & 49 Vict. c. xcvi	16 July 1885
An Act for incorporating the Bexhill Water and Gas Company and conferring Powers on them with reference to the Construction of Works the Supply of Water and Gas; and for other purposes.
Hailsham Water Act 1885	48 & 49 Vict. c. xcvii	16 July 1885
An Act for incorporating the Hailsham Water Company and for conferring Powers upon them with reference to the Construction of Works the Supply of Water and for other purposes.
Local Government Board (Ireland) Provisional Orders Confirmation (Cootehill, Kildare and Thurles) Act 1885	48 & 49 Vict. c. xcviii	22 July 1885
An Act to confirm certain Provisional Orders of the Local Government Board for Ireland relating to Cootehill, Kildare, and Thurles.
	Cootehill Provisional Order 1885 Town of Cootehill. Provisional Order.	
	Kildare Waterworks Provisional Order 1885 Kildare Waterworks. Provisional Order.	
	Thurles Town Provisional Order 1885 Town of Thurles. Provisional Order.	
Metropolis (Hughes Fields, Deptford) Provisional Order Confirmation Act 1885	48 & 49 Vict. c. xcix	22 July 1885
An Act to confirm a Provisional Order of one of Her Majesty's Principal Secretaries of States for the improvement of an unhealthy area situate at Deptford within the Metropolis.
	Hughes' Fields, Deptford Improvement Order 1885 The Artizans and Labourers Dwellings Improvement Acts, 1875-1882. The Metropolis (Hughes' Fields, Deptford) Improvement, 1885. Provisional Order	
Metropolis (Tabard Street, Newington) Provisional Order Confirmation Act 1885	48 & 49 Vict. c. c	22 July 1885
An Act to confirm a Provisional Order of one of Her Majesty's Principal Secretaries of State for the improvement of an unhealthy area situated at Newington within the Metropolis.
	Tabard Street, Newington Improvement Order 1885 The Artizans and Labourers Dwellings Improvement Acts, 1875-1882. The Metropolis (Tabard Street, Newington) Improvement, 1885. Provisional Order.	
Local Government Board's Provisional Orders Confirmation (No. 4) Act 1885	48 & 49 Vict. c. ci	22 July 1885
An Act to confirm certain Provisional Orders of the Local Government Board relating to the Rural Sanitary District of the Atherstone Union, the Local Government District of Festiniog, the Rural Sanitary District of the Leyburn Union, the Borough of Newport (Monmouthshire), the Local Government District of Rawden, and the Rural Sanitary Districts of the Tadcaster and Wangford Unions.
	Atherstone Union Order 1885 Provisional Order to enable the Sanitary Authority for the Rural Sanitary District of the Atherstone Union to put in force the Compulsory Clauses of the Lands Clauses Consolidation Acts.	
	Festiniog Order 1885 Provisional Order to enable the Sanitary Authority for the Urban Sanitary District of Festiniog to put in force the Compulsory Clauses of the Lands Clauses Consolidation Acts.	
	Leyburn Union Order 1885 Provisional Order to enable the Sanitary Authority for the Rural Sanitary District of the Leyburn Union to put in force the Compulsory Clauses of the Lands Clauses Consolidation Acts.	
	Newport (Monmouthshire) Order 1885 Provisional Order to enable the Urban Sanitary Authority for the Borough of Newport (Monmouthshire) to put in force the Compulsory Clauses of the Lands Clauses Consolidation Acts.	
	Rawden Order 1885 Provisional Order to enable the Sanitary Authority for the Urban Sanitary District of Rawden to put in force the Compulsory Clauses of the Lands Clauses Consolidation Acts.	
	Tadcaster Union Order 1885 Provisional Order to enable the Sanitary Authority for the Rural Sanitary District of the Tadcaster Union to put in force the Compulsory Clauses of the Lands Clauses Consolidation Acts.	
	Wangford Union Order 1885 Provisional Order to enable the Sanitary Authority for the Rural Sanitary District of the Wangford Union to put in force the Compulsory Clauses of the Lands Clauses Consolidation Acts.	
Tramways Orders Confirmation (No. 2) Act 1885	48 & 49 Vict. c. cii	22 July 1885
An Act to confirm certain Provisional Orders made by the Board of Trade under "The Tramways Act, 1870," relating to Dudley and Kingswinford Tramways, Llwynpiod (Carmarthen) Tramways, Paisley Tramways, and Salford Corporation Tramways.
	Dudley and Kingswinford Tramways Order 1885 Order authorising the Construction of Tramways in the Parish of Kingswinford in the County of Stafford, and in the Parishes of Dudley and Oldswinford, in the County of Worcester.	
	Llwynpiod (Carmarthen) Tramways Order 1885 Order authorising the construction of Tramways in the Parish of Saint Peter in the County of the Borough of Carmarthen and the Parish of Abergwilly in the County of Carmarthen.	
	Paisley Tramways Order 1885 Order authorising the construction of Tramways in the Burgh of Paisley in the county of Renfrew.	
	Salford Corporation Tramways Order 1885 Order authorising the Mayor Aldermen and Burgesses of the Borough of Salford to construct Tramways in the said Borough.	
Tramways Orders Confirmation (No. 3) Act 1885	48 & 49 Vict. c. ciii	22 July 1885
An Act to confirm certain Provisional Orders made by the Board of Trade under the Tramways Act, 1870, relating to Birmingham and Western Districts Tramways, Birmingham Central Tramways (Extension), and Birmingham Corporation Tramways.
	Birmingham and Western Districts Tramways Order 1885 Order authorising the construction of Tramways in the Parishes or Places of Handsworth Oldbury Halesowen Smethwick Harborne Rowley Regis Coseley and Sedgley in the Counties of Worcester and Stafford.	
	Birmingham Central Tramways (Extension) Order 1885 Order authorising the Construction of Tramways in the Borough of Birmingham and in the parish of Handsworth in the County of Stafford, and Amending the Birmingham and Suburban Tramways Order 1882, the Birmingham and Western Districts Tramways Order 1882, and the Birmingham and Western Districts Tramways Order 1883.	
	Birmingham Corporation Tramways Order 1885 Order authorising the Mayor Aldermen and Burgesses of the Borough of Birmingham in the County of Warwick to alter the gauge of certain existing tramways and to construct further tramways in the said Borough.	
Pier and Harbour Orders Confirmation Act 1885	48 & 49 Vict. c. civ	22 July 1885
An Act to confirm certain Provisional Orders made by the Board of Trade under the General Pier and Harbour Act, 1861, (Note: General Pier and Harbour Act 1861 (24 & 25 Vict. c. 45)) relating to Cattewater, Dingle, Lee-on-the-Solent, North Sunderland, Plymouth, Saint Leonards, Saint Monance, and Southbourne.
	Cattewater Harbour Order 1885 Order for amending the Cattewater Harbour Orders, 1874 and 1876, and for conferring further powers on the Cattewater Commissioners.	
	Dingle Harbour Order 1885 Order for the Improvement, Maintenance, and Regulation of the Harbour of Dingle, in the County of Kerry.	
	Lee-on-Solent Pier Order 1885 Order for the Construction of a Pier and Works at Lee-on-the-Solent, in the Parish of Titchfield and County of Southampton.	
	North Sunderland Harbour Order 1885 Order for the Extension and Improvement of North Sunderland Harbour in the County of Northumberland.	
	Plymouth Pier Order 1885 Order for reviving and extending the provisions of the Plymouth Pier Orders, 1878 and 1882, and for other purposes.	
	St. Leonards Pier Order 1885 Order for the construction, maintenance, and regulation of a Promenade, Pier, and Jetty, at St. Leonards-on-Sea, in the County of Sussex.	
	Saint Monance Harbour Order 1885 Order for the improvement, maintenance, and regulation of the Harbour of Saint Monance, in the County of Fife.	
	Southbourne Pier Order 1885 Order for the construction, maintenance, and regulation of a Pier at Southbourne, in the County of Hants.	
Local Government Board's Provisional Order Confirmation (Municipal Corporation) Act 1885	48 & 49 Vict. c. cv	22 July 1885
An Act to confirm an Order of the Local Government Board under the provisions of the Municipal Corporations Act, 1883, (Note: Municipal Corporations Act 1883 (46 & 47 Vict. c. 18)) relating to the Town and Port of Seaford.
	Seaford Order 1885 An Order of the Local Government Board under the provisions of the Municipal Corporations Act, 1883.	
Local Government Board's Provisional Orders Confirmation (No. 3) Act 1885	48 & 49 Vict. c. cvi	22 July 1885
An Act to confirm certain Provisional Orders of the Local Government Board relating to the Borough of Bangor, the Local Government Districts of Blaenavon and Brynmawr, the Borough of Burnley, the Local Government District of Great Driffield, the Boroughs of Haverfordwest and Leeds, the Improvement Act District of Leek, the Borough of Pwllheli, and the Local Government District of Widnes.
	Bangor Order 1885 Provisional Order for altering the Bangor Local Board Act, 1878. (Note: Bangor Local Board Act 1878 (41 & 42 Vict. c. cxix))	
	Blaenavon Order 1885 Provisional Order for extending the Local Government District of Blaenavon.	
	Brynmawr Order 1885 Provisional Order for extending the Local Government District of Brynmawr.	
	Burnley Order 1885 Provisional Order for altering certain Local Acts. (Note: Burnley Borough Improvement Act 1871 (34 & 35 Vict. c. cliv)) (Note: Burnley Borough Improvement Act 1883 (46 & 47 Vict. c. lxxvii))	
	Great Driffield Order 1885 Provisional Order for extending the Local Government District of Great Driffield.	
	Haverfordwest Order 1885 Provisional Order for altering certain Local Acts. (Note: Haverfordwest Water Act 1833 (3 & 4 Will. 4. c. ciii)) (Note: Haverfordwest Borough Act 1868 (31 & 32 Vict. c. xxxiv))	
	Leeds Order 1885 Provisional Order for altering the Leeds Improvement Act, 1877, (Note: Leeds Improvement Act 1877 (40 & 41 Vict. c. clxxviii)) and certain Confirming Acts. (Note: Local Government Board's Provisional Orders Confirmation (Halifax, &c.) Act 1881 (44 & 45 Vict. c. lxvi)) (Note: Local Government Board's Provisional Orders Confirmation (No. 8) Act 1883 (46 & 47 Vict. c. xcix)) (Note: Local Government Board's Provisional Order Confirmation (No. 10) Act 1883 (46 & 47 Vict. c. xci))	
	Leek Order 1885 Provisional Order for altering the Leek Improvement Act, 1855. (Note: Leek Improvement Act 1855 (18 & 19 Vict. c. cxxxii))	
	Pwllheli Order 1885 Provisional Order for altering the mode of defraying the Expenses of an Urban Sanitary Authority.	
	Widnes Order 1885 Provisional Order for partially repealing and altering the Widnes Improvement Act, 1867, (Note: Widnes Improvement Act 1867 (30 & 31 Vict. c. cxxvi)) and the Widnes Local Board Act, 1875. (Note: Widnes Local Board Act 1875 (38 & 39 Vict. c. lxxxviii))	
Local Government Board's Provisional Orders Confirmation (No. 7) Act 1885	48 & 49 Vict. c. cvii	22 July 1885
An Act to confirm certain Provisional Orders of the Local Government Board relating to the Borough of Batley, the Improvement Act District of Bournemouth, the Borough of Evesham, the City of Manchester, the Local Government District of Worthing, and the Ystradyfodwg and Pontypridd Main Sewerage District.
	Batley Order 1885 Provisional Order for altering certain Local Acts. (Note: Batley Corporation Waterworks Act 1871 (34 & 35 Vict. c. xl)) (Note: Batley Corporation Waterworks Act 1878 (41 & 42 Vict. c. xxvii))	
	Bournemouth Order 1885 Provisional Order under Section 304 of the Public Health Act, 1875. (Note: Public Health Act 1875 (38 & 39 Vict. c. 55))	
	Evesham Order 1885 Provisional Order for altering the mode of defraying the Expenses of an Urban Sanitary Authority, and for partially repealing and altering a Local Act (Note: Evesham Improvement Act 1824 (5 Geo. 4. c. lxvii)) and a Confirming Act. (Note: Local Government Board's Provisional Orders Confirmation (Atherton, &c.) Act 1877 (40 & 41 Vict. c. ccxlii))	
	Manchester Order 1885 Provisional Order for partially repealing and altering certain Local Acts. (Note: Manchester Good Government and Police Act 1844 (7 & 8 Vict. c. xl)) (Note: Manchester Improvement Act 1844 (7 & 8 Vict. c. xli)) (Note: Manchester Market Act 1846 (9 & 10 Vict. c. ccxix)) (Note: Manchester Corporation Waterworks Act 1847 (10 & 11 Vict. c. cciii)) (Note: Manchester Corporation Waterworks Amendment Act 1848 (11 & 12 Vict. c. ci)) (Note: Manchester General Improvement Act 1851 (14 & 15 Vict. c. cxix)) (Note: Manchester New Streets Act 1853 (16 & 17 Vict. c. xci)) (Note: Manchester Improvement Act 1854 (17 & 18 Vict. c. xxviii)) (Note: Manchester Corporation Waterworks Act 1854 (17 & 18 Vict. c. xxxviii)) (Note: Manchester Improvement Act 1858 (21 & 22 Vict. c. xxv)) (Note: Manchester Corporation Waterworks Act 1858 (21 & 22 Vict. c. lxxxvii)) (Note: Manchester Corporation Waterworks Act 1860 (23 & 24 Vict. c. xciii)) (Note: Manchester Corporation Waterworks Act 1863 (26 & 27 Vict. c. lxviii)) (Note: Manchester Corporation Waterworks Act 1865 (28 & 29 Vict. c. cxlv)) (Note: Manchester Corporation Waterworks and Improvement Act 1867 (30 & 31 Vict. c. xxxvi)) (Note: Manchester Corporation Waterworks and Improvement Act 1869 (32 & 33 Vict. c. cxvii)) (Note: Manchester Improvement Act 1871 (34 & 35 Vict. c. lxv)) (Note: Manchester Corporation Waterworks and Improvement Act 1872 (35 & 36 Vict. c. xxxi)) (Note: Manchester Corporation Waterworks and Improvement Act 1875 (38 & 39 Vict. c. clxi)) (Note: Manchester Corporation Waterworks Act 1879 (42 & 43 Vict. c. xxxvi)) (Note: Manchester Corporation Act 1882 (45 & 46 Vict. c. cciii))	
	Worthing Order 1885 Provisional Order for altering certain Confirming Acts. (Note: Local Government Supplemental Act 1859 (22 Vict. c. 31)) (Note: Local Government Act 1868 (No. 6) (31 & 32 Vict. c. cliii))	
	Ystradyfodwg and Pontypridd Order 1885 Provisional Order for forming a United District under Sect. 279 of the Public Health Act, 1875.	
Local Government Board's Provisional Orders Confirmation (Poor Law) (No. 9) Act 1885	48 & 49 Vict. c. cviii	22 July 1885
An Act to confirm certain Orders of the Local Government Board under the provisions of the Divided Parishes and Poor Law Amendment Act, 1876, as amended and extended by the Poor Law Act, 1879, relating to the Parishes of Astwood, Emberton, Gayhurst, Hardmead, Lathbury, Lavendon, North Crawley, Ravenstone, and Saint Mary and Saint Chad, Stafford; to the Hamlet of Warrington; and to the Township of Hopton and Coton.
	Astwood, &c. Order 1885 Newport Pagnell Union.	
	Hopton and Coton, &c. Order 1885 Stafford Union.	
Local Government Board (Ireland) Provisional Order Confirmation (Mullingar) Act 1885	48 & 49 Vict. c. cix	22 July 1885
An Act to confirm a Provisional Order of the Local Government Board for Ireland under the Labourers (Ireland) Act, 1883, relating to the Mullingar Union.
	Mullingar Union Labourers Order 1885 Provisional Order in pursuance of the Labourers (Ireland) Act, 1883, authorising the purchase and taking of Land otherwise than by agreement.	
District of St. John Cowley Act 1885 (repealed)	48 & 49 Vict. c. cx	22 July 1885
An Act to render valid certain Marriages at Saint John, Cowley. (Repealed by Statute Law (Repeals) Act 1977 (c. 18))
Selby and Mid-Yorkshire Union Railway Act 1885 (repealed)	48 & 49 Vict. c. cxi	22 July 1885
An Act to extend the time for the compulsory purchase of Land for, and for the completion of, the Railways authorised by the Church Fenton, Cawood and Wistow Railway Act, 1879, (Note: Church Fenton, Cawood, and Wistow Railway Act 1879 (42 & 43 Vict. c. cxxviii)) the Church Fenton, Cawood and Wistow Railway Act, 1882, (Note: Church Fenton, Cawood, and Wistow Railway Act 1882 (45 & 46 Vict. c. ccxxiii)) and the Selby and Mid-Yorkshire Union Railway Act, 1883; (Note: Selby and Mid-Yorkshire Union Railway Act 1883 (46 & 47 Vict. c. cxvi)) and for other purposes. (Repealed by Selby and Mid-Yorkshire Union Railway (Abandonment) Act 1890 (53 & 54 Vict. c. xii))
Lower Thames Valley Main Sewerage Act 1885	48 & 49 Vict. c. cxii	22 July 1885
An Act to dissolve the Lower Thames Valley Main Sewerage Board and to provide for the constitution of new United Districts for the disposal of the sewage of the Lower Thames Valley Main Sewerage District and for other purposes.
Limehouse Subway Act 1885	48 & 49 Vict. c. cxiii	22 July 1885
An Act to extend the time limited for the completion of the Limehouse Subway.
London and Blackwall Railway Act 1885	48 & 49 Vict. c. cxiv	22 July 1885
An Act to authorise the widening and improvement of parts of the London and Blackwall Railway and the raising of additional Capital; and for other purpose.
London Street Tramways (Extensions) Act 1885	48 & 49 Vict. c. cxv	22 July 1885
An Act to authorise the London Street Tramways Company to construct additional Tramways and in connexion therewith to improve certain Streets and for other purposes.
Bermondsey Vestry Act 1885	48 & 49 Vict. c. cxvi	22 July 1885
An Act for repealing certain Acts relating to the Church and disused Burial Ground of Saint James's Bermondsey in the County of Surrey and for vesting the said Church and Burial Ground in New Trustees for the Abolition of Easter Dues or Offerings and for other purposes.
Bootle-cum-Linacre (Fictitious Bonds) Act 1885 (repealed)	48 & 49 Vict. c. cxvii	22 July 1885
An Act for the Settlement of disputed Claims arising out of certain fictitious Bonds of the Corporation of Bootle-cum-Linacre and for other purposes. (Repealed by County of Merseyside Act 1980 (c. x))
South Western Railway (Various Powers) Act 1885	48 & 49 Vict. c. cxviii	22 July 1885
An Act for authorising the London and South-western Railway Company to construct additional works and to purchase additional lands; for extending the time limited for the purchase of lands for and for the completion of certain works; and for other purposes.
North British Railway Act 1885	48 & 49 Vict. c. cxix	22 July 1885
An Act to authorise the North British Railway Company to make several Railways in connexion with their Undertaking to extend the time for purchase of lands and completion of works to purchase additional lands to amalgamate with the Company the Undertaking of the Edinburgh Suburban and Southside Junction and Kelvin Valley Railway Companies to consolidate certain Stocks with the consolidated lien Stock of the Company to amend the Company's Acts in various particulars and for other purposes.
Northwich Local Board Act 1885	48 & 49 Vict. c. cxx	22 July 1885
An Act to empower the Local Board for the district of Northwich in the County of Chester to make Waterworks and to supply Water and for other purposes.
St. Helens and Wigan Junction Railway Act 1885	48 & 49 Vict. c. cxxi	22 July 1885
An Act for authorising the construction of a Railway in Lancashire to be called the St. Helens and Wigan Junction Railway and for other purposes.
Southport Improvement Act 1885	48 & 49 Vict. c. cxxii	22 July 1885
An Act to confer further powers upon the Corporation of the Borough of Southport for the Improvement of that Borough for the creation of Corporation Stock and for other purposes.
Aberdeen Corporation Water Act 1885 (repealed)	48 & 49 Vict. c. cxxiii	22 July 1885
An Act to authorise the Lord Provost, Magistrates and Town Council of the Royal Burgh and City of Aberdeen to construct additional Waterworks; and for other purposes. (Repealed by Aberdeen Corporation (Administration Finance, &c.) Order Confirmation Act 1940 (3 & 4 Geo. 6. c. iii))
Bradford Waterworks and Improvement Act 1885	48 & 49 Vict. c. cxxiv	22 July 1885
An Act for enabling the Mayor Aldermen and Burgesses of the Borough of Bradford in the West Riding of the County of York to construct and maintain additional Waterworks; to effect public improvements; to make provision for the better protection of public health; and for other purposes.
Whitehaven Town and Harbour (Incorporation) Act 1885	48 & 49 Vict. c. cxxv	22 July 1885
An Act to incorporate the Trustees of the Town Port and Harbour of Whitehaven in the County of Cumberland to extend their powers to authorise additional Waterworks and Harbour Works and for other purposes.
Manchester City Extension Act 1885	48 & 49 Vict. c. cxxvi	22 July 1885
An Act to extend the Boundaries of the City of Manchester and for other purposes.
North Berwick Water Supply Confirmation Act 1885	48 & 49 Vict. c. cxxvii	31 July 1885
An Act to confirm a Provisional Order made under the Public Health (Scotland) Act, 1867, (Note: Public Health (Scotland) Act 1867 (30 & 31 Vict. c. 101)) relating to the burgh and parish of North Berwick.
	North Berwick Order 1885 North Berwick Water. Provisional Order.	
Local Government Board's Provisional Orders Confirmation (No. 6) Act 1885	48 & 49 Vict. c. cxxviii	31 July 1885
An Act to confirm certain Provisional Orders of the Local Government Board relating to the Local Government Districts of Barking Town» Brentford, and Ealing (two), the Hartlepool Joint Hospital, the Local Government District of Oldbury, the Rural Sanitary District of the Penzance Union, the Borough of Swansea, and the Local Government District of Swinton.
	Barking Town Order 1885 Provisional Order for extending the Local Government District of Barking Town, and for other purposes.	
	Brentford and Ealing Order 1885 Provisional Order for extending the Local Government Districts of Brentford and Ealing.	
	Ealing Order 1885 Provisional Order to enable the Sanitary Authority for the Urban Sanitary District of Ealing to put in force the Compulsory Clauses of the Lands Clauses Consolidation Acts.	
	Hartlepool Order 1885 Provisional Order for altering a Confirming Act. (Note: Local Government Board's Provisional Orders Confirmation (Bath, &c.) Act 1881 (44 & 45 Vict. c. xv))	
	Oldbury Order 1885 Provisional Order for altering a Local Act. (Note: Oldbury Local Board of Health Act 1876 (39 & 40 Vict. c. cxci))	
	Penzance Union Order 1885 Provisional Order to enable the Sanitary Authority for the Rural Sanitary District of the Penzance Union to put in force the Compulsory Clauses of the Lands Clauses Consolidation Acts.	
	Swansea Order 1885 Provisional Order for altering certain Local Acts (Note: Swansea Improvement Act 1844 (7 & 8 Vict. c. cii)) (Note: Swansea Municipal Corporation Act 1863 (26 & 27 Vict. c. xiii)) and a Confirming Act. (Note: Public Health Supplemental Act 1850 (No. 2) (13 & 14 Vict. c. 90))	
	Swinton Order 1885 Provisional Order for extending the Local Government District of Swinton.	
Education Department Provisional Orders Confirmation (Birmingham, &c.) Act 1885	48 & 49 Vict. c. cxxix	31 July 1885
An Act to confirm certain Provisional Orders made by the Education Department under the Elementary Education Act, 1870, (Note: Elementary Education Act 1870 (33 & 34 Vict. c. 75)) to enable the School Boards for Birmingham, Bradford (Yorks), Cardiff, Derby, and Llanwonno to put in force the Lauds Clauses Consolidation Act, 1845, and the Acts amending the same.
	Birmingham Order 1885 The School Board for Birmingham, County of Warwick. Provisional Order for putting in force the Lands Clauses Consolidation Act, 1845. (Note: Lands Clauses Consolidation Act 1845 (8 & 9 Vict. c. 18))	
	Bradford (Yorks) Order 1885 The School Board for Bradford, County of York. Provisional Order for putting in force the Lands Clauses Consolidation Act, 1845.	
	Derby Order 1885 The School Board for Cardiff, County of Glamorgan. Provisional Order for putting in force the Lands Clauses Consolidation Act, 1845.	
	Llanwonno Order 1885 The School Board for Derby, County of Derby. Provisional Order for putting in force the Lands Clauses Consolidation Act, 1845.	
Local Government Board (Ireland) Provisional Orders Confirmation (Drumcondra and Cavan) Act 1885	48 & 49 Vict. c. cxxx	31 July 1885
An Act to confirm certain Provisional Orders of the Local Government Board for Ireland relating to the Drumcondra, Clonliffe, and Glasnevin Township, and to Waterworks in the Town of Cavan.
	Drumcondra, &c. Provisional Order 1885 Drumcondra, Clonliffe, and Glasnevin Township. Provisional Order.	
	Cavan Waterworks Provisional Order 1885 Cavan Waterworks. Provisional Order.	
Mullingar Water Act 1885	48 & 49 Vict. c. cxxxi	31 July 1885
An Act to authorise the Guardians of the Mullingar Union to construct Waterworks and obtain Water Supply for the Town and Manor of Mullingar in the County of Westmeath and for other purposes.
Skegness and St. Leonards Tramway Act 1885	48 & 49 Vict. c. cxxxii	31 July 1885
An Act to authorise the Skegness Chapel St. Leonards and Alford Tramways Company to abandon portions of the Tramway authorised by the Skegness Chapel St. Leonards and Alford Tramways Act 1883 (Note: Skegness Chapel St. Leonards and Alford Tramways Act 1883 (46 & 47 Vict. c. clxxxiii)) to extend the time limited by that Act for the purchase of lands and completion of works to authorise the construction of new Tramways and for other purposes.
Colne Valley Water Act 1885	48 & 49 Vict. c. cxxxiii	31 July 1885
An Act for transferring the Undertaking of the Harrow Waterworks Company to the Colne Valley Water Company and for other purposes.
North Wales Narrow Gauge Railways (Extensions, &c.) Act 1885 or the North Wales Narrow Gauge Railways (Extensions) Act 1885	48 & 49 Vict. c. cxxxiv	31 July 1885
An Act to empower the North Wales Narrow Gauge Railways Company to improve their Railway by extending it to Carnarvon Harbour and by constructing other Railways and works and for other purposes.
River Bann Navigation Act 1885	48 & 49 Vict. c. cxxxv	31 July 1885
An Act to empower the Coleraine Harbour Commissioners to make certain short Railways and further to improve the Navigation of the River Bann and for other purposes.
Glasgow Corporation Waterworks Act 1885	48 & 49 Vict. c. cxxxvi	31 July 1885
An Act to authorise the Commissioners of the Glasgow Corporation Waterworks to obtain an additional supply of Water; to construct additional Waterworks and other Works; and for other purposes.
South Eastern Railway (Various Powers) Act 1885	48 & 49 Vict. c. cxxxvii	31 July 1885
An Act for authorising the South-eastern Railway Company to execute various works and conferring on them further powers in respect of their own undertaking and of the undertakings of other Companies and for other purposes.
Regent's Canal City and Docks Railway Act 1885 (repealed)	48 & 49 Vict. c. cxxxviii	31 July 1885
An Act to amend the Acts relating to the Regent's Canal City and Docks Railway Company; and for other purposes. (Repealed by Grand Union Canal Act 1943 (6 & 7 Geo. 6. c. v))
Alexandra (Newport and South Wales) Docks and Railway Act 1885	48 & 49 Vict. c. cxxxix	31 July 1885
An Act for empowering the Alexandra (Newport and South Wales) Docks and Railway Company to make a Railway from their Alexandra Dock to their Newport Dock and other works and for other purposes.
Glyn Valley Tramway Act 1885	48 & 49 Vict. c. cxl	31 July 1885
An Act to confer further Powers on the Glyn Valley Tramway Company; and for other purposes.
Barry Dock and Railways Act 1885	48 & 49 Vict. c. cxli	31 July 1885
An Act to enable the Barry Dock and Railways Company to construct a new Railway and for other purposes.
Hebburn Quay and Landing-Place Act 1885	48 & 49 Vict. c. cxlii	31 July 1885
An Act to enable the Local Board for the District of Hebburn in the County of Durham to make and maintain a Quay and Landing-place at Hebburn and for other purposes.
Stratford-upon-Avon, Towcester and Midland Junction Railway Act 1885	48 & 49 Vict. c. cxliii	31 July 1885
An Act to authorise the Stratford-upon-Ayon Towcester and Midland Junction Railway Company to divert a portion of their authorised Railway; and for other purposes.
North London Railway Act 1885	48 & 49 Vict. c. cxliv	31 July 1885
An Act to enable the North London Railway Company to widen their Railway near Columbia Market, Bethnal Green; and for other purposes.
Liverpool Tramways Act 1885 (repealed)	48 & 49 Vict. c. cxlv	31 July 1885
An Act to authorise the Liverpool United Tramways and Omnibus Company to raise additional Capital and to confer further Powers upon them with reference to other Tramways in the Neighbourhood of Liverpool and for other purposes. (Repealed by Liverpool Corporation Act 1921 (11 & 12 Geo. 5. c. lxxiv))
Bury Improvement Act 1885	48 & 49 Vict. c. cxlvi	31 July 1885
An Act to extend the Municipal Boundary of the Borough of Bury to confer further powers upon the Corporation of Bury with respect to their Gas and Water Undertakings and to make further provision for the good government of the Borough to authorise the creation of Corporation Stock and for other purposes.
Great Western Railway Act 1885	48 & 49 Vict. c. cxlvii	31 July 1885
An Act for conferring further Powers upon the Great Western Railway Company in connexion with their own and other Undertakings, and upon them and other Companies in connexion with Undertakings in which they are jointly interested; for authorising and confirming agreements between the Great Western Railway Company and other Companies; and for other purposes.
Stalybridge and Mossley Gas Act 1885	48 & 49 Vict. c. cxlviii	31 July 1885
An Act to transfer the undertaking of the Stalybridge Gas Company to the Corporations of Stalybridge and Mossley and for other purposes.
Wirral Railway Act 1885	48 & 49 Vict. c. cxlix	31 July 1885
An Act to authorise the Wirral Railway Company to extend their Railway to the Chester to Connah's Quay Railway of the Manchester Sheffield and Lincolnshire Railway Company and for other purposes.
Wrexham and Ellesmere Railway Act 1885	48 & 49 Vict. c. cl	31 July 1885
An Act for making a Railway from Wrexham in the county of Denbigh to Ellesmere in the county of Salop; and for other purposes.
Rathmines and Rathgar Improvement Act 1885	48 & 49 Vict. c. cli	31 July 1885
An Act to confer further Powers on the Rathmines and Rathgar Improvement Commissioners to make further provision respecting the borrowing of money by them and the good government of their district and for other purposes.
Renton Water Supply Confirmation Act 1885	48 & 49 Vict. c. clii	6 August 1885
An Act to confirm a Provisional Order made under the Public Health (Scotland) Act, 1867, relating to the Village of Benton.
	Renton Water Supply Provisional Order 1885 Renton Water Supply. Provisional Order.	
Bawtry and Trent Railway and Dock (Abandonment) Act 1885	48 & 49 Vict. c. cliii	6 August 1885
An Act for the Abandonment of the Bawtry and Trent Railway and Dock.
Lynton Railway Act 1885 (repealed)	48 & 49 Vict. c. cliv	6 August 1885
An Act for the making and maintaining of the Lynton Railway and for other purposes. (Repealed by Statute Law (Repeals) Act 2013 (c. 2))
River Witham Outfall Improvement (Extension of Time) Act 1885	48 & 49 Vict. c. clv	6 August 1885
An Act for extending the time for completing the Works for improving the Outfall of the River Witham in the county of Lincoln authorised by the River Witham Outfall Improvement Act 1880. (Note: River Witham Outfall Improvement Act 1880 (43 & 44 Vict. c. cliii))
Glasgow Corporation Tramways Act 1885 (repealed)	48 & 49 Vict. c. clvi	6 August 1885
An Act to authorise the Lord Provost, Magistrates, and Council of the City of Glasgow to construct additional Tramways; and for other purposes. (Repealed by Glasgow Corporation (Tramways Consolidation) Order Confirmation Act 1905 (5 Edw. 7. c. cxxviii))
Taff Vale Railway Act 1885	48 & 49 Vict. c. clvii	6 August 1885
An Act to empower the Taff Vale Railway Company to construct new Railways and to acquire additional Lands and to raise farther Capital and for other purposes.
Witham Drainage (Steeping River) Act 1885	48 & 49 Vict. c. clviii	6 August 1885
An Act to provide further means for protecting and draining the Fourth District of the Witham Drainage and other Lands in the County of Lincoln by improving Steeping River and for other purposes relating to the Witham Drainage.
Horsforth Waterworks Extension Act 1885	48 & 49 Vict. c. clix	6 August 1885
An Act for authorising the Horsforth Waterworks Company to construct additional Works and to purchase additional Lands and to raise additional Capital and for other purposes.
Greenwich and Millwall Subway Act 1885	48 & 49 Vict. c. clx	6 August 1885
An Act to revive and extend the Powers of the Greenwich and Millwall Subway Company and for other purposes.
Ballyclare, Ligoniel and Belfast Junction Railway (Abandonment) Act 1885	48 & 49 Vict. c. clxi	6 August 1885
An Act for the Abandonment of the Ballyclare Ligoniel and Belfast Junction Railway and for other purposes.
Belfast, Strandtown and High Holywood Railway (Abandonment) Act 1885	48 & 49 Vict. c. clxii	6 August 1885
An Act for the Abandonment of the Belfast Strandtown and High Holywood Railway and for other purposes.
Metropolitan Outer Circle Railway (Abandonment) Act 1885 (repealed)	48 & 49 Vict. c. clxiii	6 August 1885
An Act for the abandonment of the Metropolitan Outer Circle Railway. (Repealed by Statute Law (Repeals) Act 2013 (c. 2))
Worcester Extension Act 1885 (repealed)	48 & 49 Vict. c. clxiv	6 August 1885
An Act to extend the Boundaries of the City and County of the City of Worcester and to empower the Corporation to create and issue Consolidated Stock and for other purposes. (Repealed by Worcester City Council Act 1985 (c. xliii))
Eastbourne Improvement Act 1885	48 & 49 Vict. c. clxv	6 August 1885
An Act to make further and better Provision for the Improvement Health and Good Government of the Borough of Eastbourne to provide for the Issue of Corporation Stock and for other purposes.
Giant's Causeway, Portrush and Bush Valley Railway and Tramways Act 1885	48 & 49 Vict. c. clxvi	6 August 1885
An Act to enable the Giant's Causeway Portrush and Bush Valley Railway and Tramways Company to abandon part of their authorised Railway and to construct a new Railway instead thereof; to confer further powers upon that Company for completing the remainder of their authorised Undertaking; to authorise the abandonment of the Glenariff Railway and Pier; and for other purposes.
Metropolitan Board of Works (Various Powers) Act 1885	48 & 49 Vict. c. clxvii	6 August 1885
An Act to confer Powers on the Metropolitan Board of Works with respect to the making of a new Street in the parishes of St. Andrew Holborn and of St. James and St. John Clerkenwell, the establishing and regulating of a Ferry across the River Thames at Woolwich, the providing of Recreation Grounds for the public, and for other purposes.
Belfast Central Railway (Abandonment) Act 1885	48 & 49 Vict. c. clxviii	6 August 1885
An Act for the Abandonment of certain Railways authorised by the Belfast Central Railway (New Lines, &c.) Act 1880 (Note: Belfast Central Railway (New Lines, &c.) Act 1880 (43 & 44 Vict. c. clxxxiv)) and the Belfast Central Railway Act 1884 (Note: Belfast Central Railway Act 1884 (47 & 48 Vict. c. xxxvii)) and for other purposes.
Penwortham Bridge Act 1885 (repealed)	48 & 49 Vict. c. clxix	6 August 1885
An Act to provide for building a new Bridge over the River Ribble from Preston to Penwortham in the County Palatine of Lancaster and for other purposes. (Repealed by Penwortham Bridge Act 1912 (2 & 3 Geo. 5. c. xi))
Southampton Corporation Act 1885	48 & 49 Vict. c. clxx	6 August 1885
An Act to enable the Corporation of Southampton to obtain a further supply of Water; to create Corporation Stock; and for other purposes.
Hull (Drypool) Bridge and Improvements Act 1885 (repealed)	48 & 49 Vict. c. clxxi	6 August 1885
An Act to empower the Mayor Aldermen and Burgesses of the Borough of Kingston-upon-Hull to construct a new Bridge over the River Hull with Approaches thereto; to make a new Street and improvements of Streets; and for other purposes. (Repealed by Humberside Act 1982 (c. iii))
Aberdeen Reformatories and Industrial Schools Act 1885	48 & 49 Vict. c. clxxii	6 August 1885
An Act for conferring further Powers with reference to the Reformatories and Industrial Schools in Aberdeen.
Cart Navigation Act 1885	48 & 49 Vict. c. clxxiii	6 August 1885
An Act for altering the constitution and enlarging the powers of the Trustees of the Cart Navigation; for enabling them to deepen and improve the Navigation, to levy new Rates, and to borrow additional Money; for sanctioning a Guarantee Bate upon the Owners and Occupiers of lands and heritages in Paisley; and for other purposes.
Evesham, Redditch and Stratford-upon-Avon Junction Railway Act 1885	48 & 49 Vict. c. clxxiv	6 August 1885
An Act for the funding consolidation and capitalisation of certain debts liabilities and engagements of the Evesham Redditch and Stratford-upon-Avon Junction Railway Company by the creation and issue of New Debenture Stock in lieu thereof and for other purposes.
Cardiff, Penarth and Cadoxton-juxta-Barry Junction Railway Act 1885	48 & 49 Vict. c. clxxv	6 August 1885
An Act to incorporate a Company for the Construction of Railways between Cardiff and Penarth and Cadoxton-juxta-Barry and other places; and for other purposes.
Didcot Newbury and Southampton Railway (Money) Act 1885	48 & 49 Vict. c. clxxvi	6 August 1885
An Act to confer further Powers on the Didcot Newbury and Southampton Railway Company.
Belfast Central Railway (Sale) Act 1885	48 & 49 Vict. c. clxxvii	6 August 1885
An Act to authorise the Sale of the existing undertaking of the Belfast Central Railway Company to the Great Northern Railway Company (Ireland).
Rhymney Railway Act 1885	48 & 49 Vict. c. clxxviii	6 August 1885
An Act to authorise the Rhymney Railway Company to make a new Railway and other works in the County of Glamorgan; and for other purposes.
Edinburgh Extension and Sewerage Act 1885 (repealed)	48 & 49 Vict. c. clxxix	6 August 1885
An Act for extending the Municipal and Police Boundaries of the City of Edinburgh, including the Royal Burgh thereof over Blackford Mill, for purification of the Braid or Figgate Burn by interception of the sewage from the Jordan or Powburn, and conveyance of the same to the sea, and other purposes. (Repealed by Edinburgh Corporation Order Confirmation Act 1933 (24 & 25 Geo. 5. c. v))
Mossley Improvement Act 1885	48 & 49 Vict. c. clxxx	6 August 1885
An Act to extend the Boundary of the Borough of Mossley; to make further provision for the improvement and Good Government of the Borough; and for other purposes.
Scarborough, Bridlington and West Riding Junction Railways Act 1885	48 & 49 Vict. c. clxxxi	6 August 1885
An Act for incorporating the Scarborough Bridlington and West Riding Junction Railways Company and empowering them to make and maintain Railways in the North and East Ridings of the County of York and for other purposes.
Weston-super-Mare, Clevedon and Portishead Tramways Act 1885	48 & 49 Vict. c. clxxxii	6 August 1885
An Act for incorporating the Weston-super-Mare Clevedon and Portishead Tramways Company and empowering them to construct Tramways and other works in the County of Somerset and for other purposes.
Borough of Sunderland Act 1885 (repealed)	48 & 49 Vict. c. clxxxiii	6 August 1885
An Act for making further provision with respect to the improvement and Government of the Borough of Sunderland and the issue of Corporation Stock by the Corporation of the Borough; and for other purposes. (Repealed by Tyne and Wear Act 1980 (c. xliii))
Portpatrick and Wigtownshire Railways (Sale and Transfer) Act 1885	48 & 49 Vict. c. clxxxiv	6 August 1885
An Act to authorise the Sale and Transfer of the Portpatrick Railway and the Wigtownshire Railway to the London and North-western, the Midland, the Caledonian, and the Glasgow and South-western Railway Companies jointly; and for other purposes.
Selby Dam Drainage Act 1885	48 & 49 Vict. c. clxxxv	6 August 1885
An Act for incorporating a Board of Drainage Commissioners with powers to drain and improve certain lands in the Parishes Townships and places of Selby Brayton Thorpe Willoughby Hambleton Wistow Scalm Park Cawood Sherburn Lennerton Rest Park South Milford Barkston Monkfryston Lumby Church-Fenton Little Fenton Biggin Ulleskelf and Ryther in the West Riding of the County of York.
Neath Waterworks Act 1885 (repealed)	48 & 49 Vict. c. clxxxvi	6 August 1885
An Act to confer further Powers on the Neath Water Company. (Repealed by West Glamorgan Water Board Order 1966 (SI 1966/1096))
East Usk Railway Act 1885	48 & 49 Vict. c. clxxxvii	6 August 1885
An Act for incorporating the East Usk Railway Company and for other purposes.
Manchester Ship Canal Act 1885	48 & 49 Vict. c. clxxxviii	6 August 1885
An Act to authorize the construction of a Ship Canal to Manchester; and for other Purposes.
Education Department Provisional Order Confirmation (London) Act 1885	48 & 49 Vict. c. clxxxix	14 August 1885
An Act to confirm a Provisional Order made by the Education Department under the Elementary Education Act, 1870, to enable the School Board for London to put in force the Lands Clauses Consolidation Act, 1845, and the Acts amending the same.
	London Order 1885	
Local Government Board (Ireland) Provisional Orders Confirmation (Dublin Corporation Waterworks) Act 1885	48 & 49 Vict. c. cxc	14 August 1885
An Act to confirm two Provisional Orders of the Local Government Board for Ireland relating to the Dublin Corporation Waterworks, and to the Dublin Corporation Waterworks and Fire Brigade Provisional Order, 1874.
	Dublin Corporation Waterworks Provisional Order 1885	
	Dublin Corporation and Waterworks Provisional Order (Kingstown) 1885	
Otley Local Board Act 1885 (repealed)	48 & 49 Vict. c. cxci	14 August 1885
An Act to enable the Local Board of Otley in the West Riding of the County of York to make additional Waterworks to establish and regulate Markets and for other purposes. (Repealed by West Yorkshire Act 1980 (c. xiv))
Shanklin and Chale Railway Act 1885	48 & 49 Vict. c. cxcii	14 August 1885
An Act for incorporating the Shanklin and Chale Railway Company and for other purposes.
Ballymena and Ahoghill Tramways Act 1885	48 & 49 Vict. c. cxciii	14 August 1885
An Act to authorise the construction of Tramways from Ballymena to Ahoghill in the County of Antrim; and for other purposes.
Colne Valley and Halstead Railway (Arrangement) Act 1885	48 & 49 Vict. c. cxciv	14 August 1885
An Act to enable the Colne Valley and Halstead Railway Company to re-constitute the Board of Directors to refer the affairs in that Company to Arbitration to raise additional Capital and for other purposes.
Corporation of London (Tower Bridge) Act 1885	48 & 49 Vict. c. cxcv	14 August 1885
An Act to empower the Corporation of London to construct a Bridge over the River Thames near the Tower of London with approaches thereto and for other purposes.
Hastings Improvement Act 1885	48 & 49 Vict. c. cxcvi	14 August 1885
An Act to confer additional Powers on the Corporation of Hastings with respect to the Management and Improvement of the Borough.
Manchester, Middleton and District Tramways Act 1885	48 & 49 Vict. c. cxcvii	14 August 1885
An Act for making Tramways in the County of Lancaster to be called the Manchester Middleton and District Tramways and for other purposes.
Mersey Railway Act 1885	48 & 49 Vict. c. cxcviii	14 August 1885
An Act to authorise the Mersey Railway Company to make Branch Railways in Liverpool and Birkenhead and for other purposes.
Peckham and East Dulwich Tramways Act 1885	48 & 49 Vict. c. cxcix	14 August 1885
An Act to authorise the Peckham and East Dulwich Tramways Company to construct new Tramways in the County of Surrey and for other purposes.
Worcester and Broom Railway Act 1885 (repealed)	48 & 49 Vict. c. cc	14 August 1885
An Act for making Railways from Worcester to Broom and for other purposes. (Repealed by Worcester and Broom Railway (Abandonment) Act 1894 (57 & 58 Vict. c. xi))

=== Private acts ===
Short title	Citation	Royal assent
Long title
Naturalization of Prince Henry of Battenberg Act 1885	48 & 49 Vict. c. 1 Pr.	6 August 1885
An Act to Naturalise His Royal Highness Prince Henry Maurice, of Battenberg, and to grant and confer on him all the Rights, Privileges, and Capacities of a Natural-born Subject of Her Majesty the Queen.
Leeds Coloured Cloth Hall Act 1885	48 & 49 Vict. c. 2 Pr.	6 August 1885
An Act to enable the Trustees of the Leeds Coloured Cloth Hall to sell the same, and to regulate the Application of the Purchase Money, and for other purposes.
Earl de la Warr's Estate Act 1885	48 & 49 Vict. c. 3 Pr.	6 August 1885
An Act to enable the Trustees of the Earl De La Warr's Settled Estates to raise money on the security of the Estates comprised in a Settlement of the 30th day of January 1877, and to apply the money for the furtherance of building on the Bexhill Estate, in the County of Sussex, comprised in such Settlement, and to grant options of purchase of parts of the Bexhill Estate, and for other purposes.
Lord Haldon's Estate Act 1885	48 & 49 Vict. c. 4 Pr.	6 August 1885
An Act to facilitate Sales of Settled Estates of the Right Honourable Lawrence Hesketh, Lord Haldon, at Torquay and elsewhere, and to raise Money for payment of the Charges on his Life Estate in such Estates, and for the Repair and Improvement of such Estates, and for vesting in Trustees certain Policies of Assurance on the Life of Lord Haldon, and for other purposes.
Towneley Estates Act 1885	48 & 49 Vict. c. 5 Pr.	6 August 1885
An Act for carrying into effect the Division of certain Hereditaments known as the Towneley Estate, in the Counties of Lancaster and York; the Estate in the Forest of Bowland, in the same Counties; and the Stella and Stanley Estates, in the County of Durham, and for other purposes.
Foundling Hospital Act 1885	48 & 49 Vict. c. 6 Pr.	6 August 1885
An Act to confirm certain Powers contained in the Charter of the Governors and Guardians of the Hospital, commonly called "The Foundling Hospital."
Ramsden Estate Act 1885	48 & 49 Vict. c. 7 Pr.	6 August 1885
An Act for giving further Powers to the Leasing Authority and general Trustees of "The Ramsden Estate Act, 1867;" (Note: Ramsden Estate Act 1867 (30 & 31 Vict. c. 2 Pr.)) and for varying in some respects the provisions of that Act, and for other purposes.

=== Sources ===
- "The Public General Statutes, Volume 21: 48 & 49 Victoria – 1884-5". Law Reports, Statutes. 1867 – via HathiTrust.
- The Public General Acts: 48 & 49 Victoria – 1884-5. Proprietors of the Law Journal Reports – via Internet Archive.
- Journal of the House of Commons. Vol. 140. London: His Majesty's Stationery Office. pp. 3–417.
- Chronological Table of and Index to the Statutes. Vol. 1: To the End of the Session 59 Vict. Sess. 2 (1895) (13th ed.). London: Her Majesty's Stationery Office. 1896. pp. 513–516 – via Google Books.

== See also ==
- List of acts of the Parliament of the United Kingdom
