= Customs and Inland Revenue Act 1885 =

Act of the Parliament of the United Kingdom

Customs and Inland Revenue Act 1885 (Note: Section 1.)
- Act of Parliament
- Parliament of the United Kingdom
- Long title: An Act to grant certain Duties of Customs and Inland Revenue, and to amend the laws relating to Customs and Inland Revenue.
- Citation: 48 & 49 Vict. c. 51
- Territorial extent: United Kingdom

Dates
- Royal assent: 6 August 1885
- Commencement: 6 August 1885 (Note: The Acts of Parliament (Commencement) Act 1793.)
- Repealed: Northern Ireland: 18 December 1953; England and Wales and Scotland:)6 April 1959
Other legislation
Amends	Inland Revenue Act 1880; See § Repealed enactments
Repeals/revokes	See § Repealed enactments
Repealed by	Statute Law Revision Act 1953; Finance Act 1959

Status: Repealed

Text of statute as originally enacted

The Customs and Inland Revenue Act 1885 (48 & 49 Vict. c. 51) was an act of the Parliament of the United Kingdom that granted certain duties of customs and inland revenue, and amended the laws relating to customs and inland revenue.

== Provisions ==
=== Repealed enactments ===
Section 10 of the act repealed 7 enactments, listed in the schedule to the act.

Citation	Short title	Description	Extent of repeal
56 Geo. 3. c. 58	Beer Act 1816	An Act to repeal an Act made in the fifty-first year of His present Majesty, for allowing the manufacture and use of a liquor prepared from sugar for colouring porter.	The whole act.
23 & 24 Vict. c. 129	Excise on Spirits Act 1860	An Act to grant Excise duties on British spirits, and on spirits imported from the Channel Islands.	Section 4.
25 & 26 Vict. c. 22	Revenue Act 1862	An Act to continue certain duties of Customs and Inland Revenue for the service of Her Majesty, and to grant, alter, and repeal certain other duties.	Section 20.
27 & 28 Vict. c. 12	Warehousing of British Spirits Act 1864	An Act to amend the laws relating to the warehousing of British spirits.	Section 12.
28 & 29 Vict. c. 98	Warehousing of British Compounded Spirits Act 1865	An Act to allow British compounded spirits to be warehoused upon drawback.	Section 12.
44 & 45 Vict. c. 12	Customs and Inland Revenue Act 1881	The Customs and Inland Revenue Act, 1881.	Section 16.
45 & 46 Vict. c. 72	Revenue, Friendly Societies, and National Debt Act 1882	The Revenue Friendly Societies and National Debt Act, 1882.	Section 4.

== Subsequent developments ==
The whole act was repealed for Northern Ireland by section 1 of, and the first schedule to, the Statute Law Revision Act 1953 (2 & 3 Eliz. 2. c. 5), which came into force on 18 December 1953.

The whole act was repealed for England and Wales and Scotland by section 32 of, and part III of the eighth schedule to, the Finance Act 1959 (7 & 8 Eliz. 2. c. 58), which came into force on 29 July 1959; the repeal had effect in relation to any yearly period beginning after 5 April 1959.
