= Canada North-West Land Company =

Former Canadian land development company

- Formerly: The Canada North-West Land Co. Ltd.
- Type: Public
- Industry: Land development
- Founded: 24 July 1882; 144 years ago
- Founders: William Bain Scarth; Edmund Boyd Osler; John Kennedy Tod; Oliver H. Northcote
- Headquarters: London, England

The Canada North-West Land Company (CNWLC) was a British-Canadian land development company based in London, England.

== History ==
The 1880 and 1881 amendments to the Dominion Lands Act gave rise to the first land companies in Canada, enabling them to acquire lands outside the Railway Belt for settlement. Both the Government of Canada and the railways relied on land or colonization companies to manage land sales and settlement.

The Canadian Pacific Railway Company president, George Stephen, made an arrangement in 1882 with William Bain Scarth, E.B. Osler, John Kennedy Tod, and Oliver H. Northcote for a sale of millions of acres of land in the North-West Territories.

On June 6, 1882, the deal was made with the four men to purchase CA$13 million in bonds and 5 million acres (20,000 km^{2}) of land from the railway company. Acquired at $3 per acre ($7.4/ha), the land and associated assets were transferred to the Canada North-West Land Company Limited in London.

The land development company was officially registered on July 24, 1882. Upon establishment, its head office was temporarily based in London, with offices in Edinburgh, Glasgow, and Toronto.

William Bain Scarth of Toronto was general manager. Among the original board of directors were chairman William Montagu, 7th Duke of Manchester, Lord Elphinstone, Sir Roland Blennerhassett, Frank H. Evans, A.R. Grenfell, Reginald Macleod, W.J. Menzies, John Rae, Samuel Gunn, Robert Young, Donald Smith, 1st Baron Strathcona and Mount Royal, W.B. Scarth, E.B. Osler, and Alexander G. Ramsay.

The company's goals were to oversee land sales, develop townsites and infrastructure, exploit natural resources, and assist in emigration. In its promotional campaigns, the Canada North-West Land Company offered 5 million acres of unrestricted farmland across southern Manitoba and the Regina, Qu'Appelle, Souris, and Moose Mountain districts. It also marketed and sold townsites to attract settlers and investors. The Canada North-West Co. held a 50% interest in all townsites to be established between Winnipeg and the Rocky Mountains along the Canadian Pacific Railway main line.

In 1883, the company's contract was amended to 2,200,000 acres (8,900 km^{2}), excluding town sites, and its head offices were transferred from Toronto to Winnipeg. In addition to its land holdings, the Canada North-West Land Company acted as trustee for 47 towns along the CPR mainline, with the trusteeship ending in 1908.

The company had sold only 274,553 acres (1,111.08 km^{2}) by 1892. That year, Canadian ownership increased while British investors, discouraged by slow settlement, prompted liquidation. A new Canadian firm with the same name was formed to take over its assets. Control shifted to President William Van Horne and Vice-President E.B. Osler, joined on the board by Donald Smith, Richard B. Angus, and Thomas Shaughnessy—all closely tied to the Canadian Pacific Railway Company.

Land administration and sales were transferred to the CPR Land Department in 1894. Starting in 1906, the directors began selling land and returning some of the proceeds to shareholders. Lauchlan Alexander Hamilton oversaw the CPR Land Department, which managed land sales until his departure in 1900.

== See also ==
- Canadian Pacific Railway
- Canadian Pacific Railway Company
