= Medical Relief Disqualification Removal Act 1885 =

Act of the Parliament of the United Kingdom

Medical Relief Disqualification Removal Act 1885 (Note: Section 1.)
- Act of Parliament
- Parliament of the United Kingdom
- Long title: An Act to prevent Medical Relief disqualifying a person from voting.
- Citation: 48 & 49 Vict. c. 46
- Territorial extent: United Kingdom (Note: Section 2(1).)

Dates
- Royal assent: 6 August 1885
- Commencement: 15 July 1884 (Note: Section 2(2).)
- Repealed: 6 February 1918
Other legislation
Repealed by	Representation of the People Act 1918

Status: Repealed

Text of statute as originally enacted

The Medical Relief Disqualification Removal Act 1885 (48 & 49 Vict. c. 46) was an act of the Parliament of the United Kingdom. It became law on 6 August 1885.

The act provided that any person who had received medical or surgical treatment, for themselves or their family, paid for under the poor laws, was no longer disqualified from voting in parliamentary or municipal elections. The disqualification remained, however, with regards to voting for a Guardian of the Poor, a member of a parochial board, or any other body which governed poor relief.

The removal of the disqualification was to be considered as having been effective from 15 July 1884.

As to the meaning of "medical relief", see Kirkhouse v Blakeway.

The whole act, so far as unrepealed, was repealed by section 47(1) of, and the eight schedule to, the Representation of the People Act 1918 (7 & 8 Geo. 5. c. 64), which came into force on 6 February 1918.

== Bibliography ==
- Paterson, W., ed. (1885). "Medical Relief Disqualification Removal Act, 1885". The Practical Statutes of the Session 1885. Horace Cox. London. pp. 231 to 234.
- Lely, J. M. (1895). "Medical Relief Disqualification Removal Act, 1885". Statutes of Practical Utility. (Chitty's Statutes). Vol. 8 (5th ed.). Chancery Lane, London: Sweet and Maxwell. Stevens and Sons. pp. 305 to 306.
- "The Medical Relief Disqualification Removal Act, 1885". Chitty's Statutes of Practical Utility. Vol. 9 (6th ed.). Sweet and Maxwell. 1912. p. 542.
- Mattinson, Miles Walker (1885). The Franchise Acts 1884-5, being the Representation of the People Act, 1884; Registration Act, 1885; Parliamentary Elections (Redistribution) Act, 1885, and Medical Relief Disqualification Removal Act, 1885, with Introduction and Notes. London. Catalogue. Review at "Nine Law Books" (1885) 60 The Saturday Review 616 (7 November 1885)
- Lely, J. M.; Foulkes, W. D. I. (1885). "48 & 49 Vict c 46". The Parliamentary Election Acts for England and Wales. Fleet Street, London: William Clowes and Sons. pp. 73 to 73b.
- Heath Saint, John James (1885). "Medical Relief Disqualification Removal Act, 1885". Voters and Their Registration. Fleet Street, London: Butterworths. pp. 274 to 278.
- Heath Saint, John James (1887). A Digest of Parliamentary and Municipal Registration Cases. Second Edition. Fleet Street, London: Butterworths. pp. 394-395.
- "Parliament". The Complete Annual Digest of every Reported Case in all the Courts. Emden and Thompson. 1887. Paragraph 10 at column 258.
- Rodgers, Brian (Spring 1956). "The Medical Relief (Disqualification Removal) Act, 1885: A Storm in a Political Teacup". Parliamentary Affairs. 9 (2): 188–194.
- "Medical Relief Disqualification Removal". Companion to the Almanac; or, Year-Book of General Information for 1886. p. 249.
