= Elections (Hours of Poll) Act 1885 =

Act of the Parliament of the United Kingdom

Elections (Hours of Poll) Act 1885 (Note: Section 4.)
- Act of Parliament
- Parliament of the United Kingdom
- Long title: An Act to extend the Hours of Polling at Parliamentary and Municipal Elections.
- Citation: 48 & 49 Vict. c. 10
- Territorial extent: United Kingdom

Dates
- Royal assent: 28 April 1885
- Commencement: 14 August 1885 (Note: Section 5.)
- Repealed: England and Wales and Scotland: 30 July 1948; Northern Ireland:
Other legislation
Repeals/revokes	Parliamentary Elections (Metropolis) Act 1878; Elections (Hours of Poll) Act 1884
Amended by	London Government Act 1939
Repealed by	England and Wales and Scotland: Representation of the People Act 1948; Northern Ireland: Elections and Franchise Act (Northern Ireland) 1946

Status: Repealed

Text of statute as originally enacted

Elections (Hours of Poll) Act 1884 (Note: Section 3.)
- Act of Parliament
- Parliament of the United Kingdom
- Long title: An Act to extend the Hours of Polling at Parliamentary and Municipal Elections in certain Boroughs.
- Citation: 47 & 48 Vict. c. 34
- Territorial extent: United Kingdom

Dates
- Royal assent: 28 July 1884
- Commencement: 28 July 1884 (Note: The Acts of Parliament (Commencement) Act 1793.)
- Repealed: 14 August 1885
Other legislation
Repealed by	Elections (Hours of Poll) Act 1885

Status: Repealed

Text of statute as originally enacted

The Elections (Hours of Poll) Act 1885 (48 & 49 Vict. c. 10) was an act of the Parliament of the United Kingdom. It became law on 28 April 1885.

The act provided that at every parliamentary election and municipal election, the poll was to remain open from 8 o'clock a.m. to 8 o'clock p.m. It did not apply in places where no poll was held, or in elections to university constituencies. It repealed the Elections (Hours of Poll) Act 1884 (47 & 48 Vict. c. 34), and went into force at the end of the enacting Parliament, meaning it first applied for the 1885 United Kingdom general election.

== Subsequent developments ==
The whole act was repealed for England and Wales and Scotland by section 80(7) of, and the thirteenth schedule to, the Representation of the People Act 1948 (11 & 12 Geo. 6. c. 65), which came into force on 30 July 1948.

== Bibliography ==
- Oliver & Boyd's new Edinburgh almanac and national repository for the year 1886. Oliver & Boyd, Edinburgh, 1886
