= Penwortham Old Bridge =

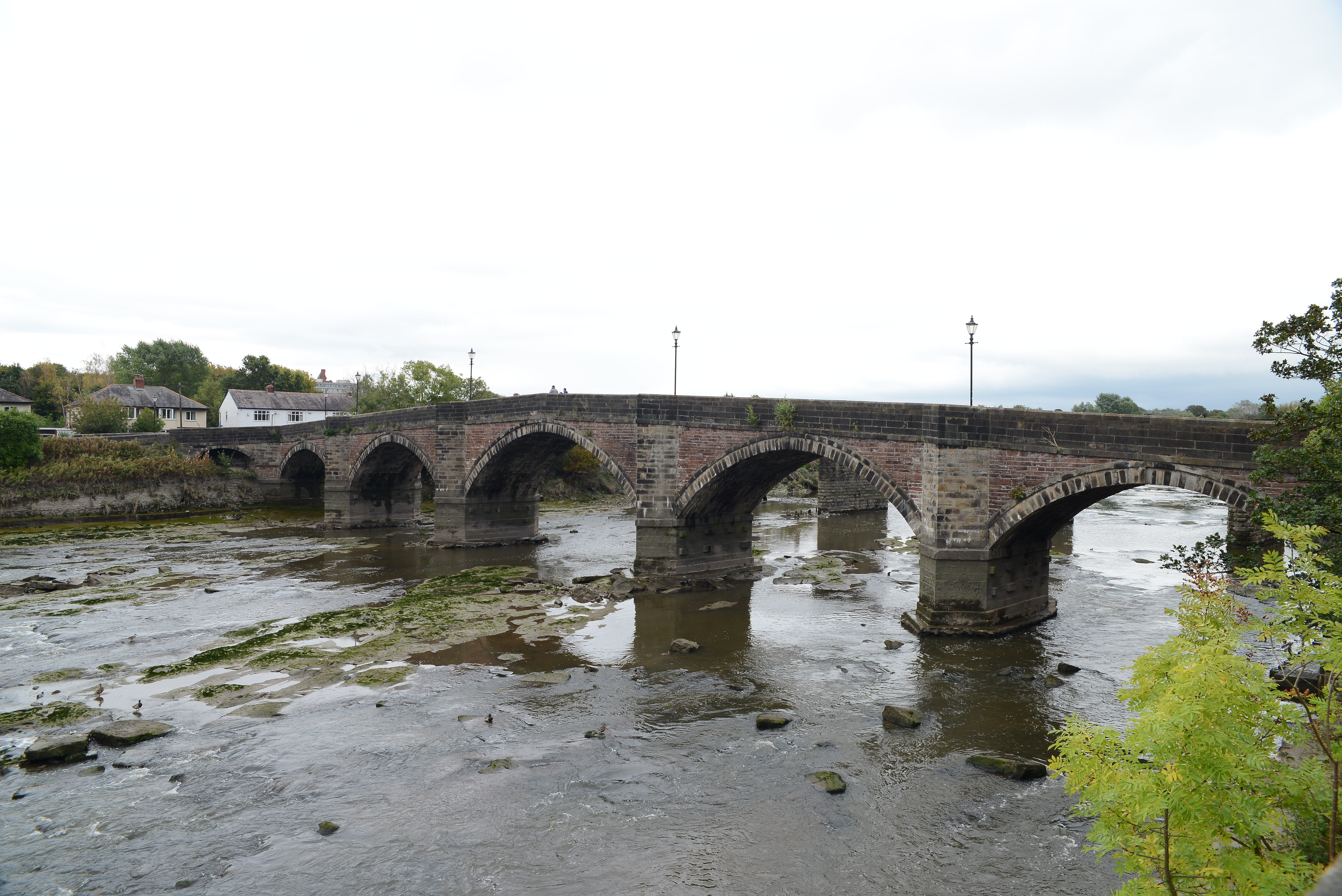
- The western side of the bridge in 2014
- Coordinates: 53.7487°N 2.7140°W
- Crosses: River Ribble
- Locale: Preston, Lancashire, England
- Heritage status: Grade II listed Scheduled monument

Characteristics
- Longest span: 18.19 metres (60 ft)

History
- Opened: 1759 (266 years ago)

Statistics
- Daily traffic: Yes
- Toll: No

Location
- Interactive map of Penwortham Old Bridge

Penwortham Old Bridge is a toll-free, five-span bridge over the River Ribble at Preston, Lancashire, England. A Grade II listed structure and a scheduled monument, located about a mile southwest of the centre of the city, it crosses the river to Penwortham. Today the bridge no longer carries motorised traffic.

The original attempt to build a bridge here was completed in 1755, but collapsed the following year.

The bridge is built in stone and consists of five unequal segmental arches, rising toward the centre. The cutwaters rise to form refuges at the sides of the carriageway. The spandrels are of red sandstone. The parapets curve to form walls on the south side, extending approximately 40 metres (130 ft) eastwards and 130 metres (430 ft) westwards.

The largest arch is the central one at 18.19 metres (59.7 ft) across and the cobbled carriageway is 5.49 metres (18.0 ft) wide. On the northern side a sixth arch, aligned almost at a right angle to the main part of the bridge, carries the approach road from the west. Opening in 1759, until the early 20th century this was lowest bridged crossing over the Ribble. Its costs have at times been funded by a toll.

The bridge was Grade II listed in two stages, the part at the southern end (then within the Preston Rural District) on 1 October 1962, and remaining part (in Preston) on 27 September 1979. It has also been listed as a scheduled monument.

== See also ==
- Listed buildings in Preston, Lancashire
- Scheduled monuments in Lancashire
