= List of acts of the Parliament of Great Britain from 1763 =

This is a complete list of acts of the Parliament of Great Britain for the year 1763.

For acts passed until 1707, see the list of acts of the Parliament of England and the list of acts of the Parliament of Scotland. See also the list of acts of the Parliament of Ireland.

For acts passed from 1801 onwards, see the list of acts of the Parliament of the United Kingdom. For acts of the devolved parliaments and assemblies in the United Kingdom, see the list of acts of the Scottish Parliament, the list of acts of the Northern Ireland Assembly, and the list of acts and measures of Senedd Cymru; see also the list of acts of the Parliament of Northern Ireland.

The number shown after each act's title is its chapter number. Acts are cited using this number, preceded by the year(s) of the reign during which the relevant parliamentary session was held; thus the Union with Ireland Act 1800 is cited as "39 & 40 Geo. 3. c. 67", meaning the 67th act passed during the session that started in the 39th year of the reign of George III and which finished in the 40th year of that reign. Note that the modern convention is to use Arabic numerals in citations (thus "41 Geo. 3" rather than "41 Geo. III"). Acts of the last session of the Parliament of Great Britain and the first session of the Parliament of the United Kingdom are both cited as "41 Geo. 3".

Acts passed by the Parliament of Great Britain did not have a short title; however, some of these acts have subsequently been given a short title by acts of the Parliament of the United Kingdom (such as the Short Titles Act 1896).

Before the Acts of Parliament (Commencement) Act 1793 came into force on 8 April 1793, acts passed by the Parliament of Great Britain were deemed to have come into effect on the first day of the session in which they were passed. Because of this, the years given in the list below may in fact be the year before a particular act was passed.

== 3 Geo. 3 ==
Continuing the second session of the 12th Parliament of Great Britain, which met from 25 November 1762 until 19 April 1763.

=== Public acts ===
Short title	Citation	Royal assent
Long title
Freemen (Admission) Act 1763 or the Freeman (Admission) Act 1763 or the Durham Act (repealed)	3 Geo. 3. c. 15	31 March 1763
An Act to prevent occasional Freemen from voting at Elections of Members to serve in Parliament for Cities and Boroughs. (Repealed by Ballot Act 1872 (35 & 36 Vict. c. 33) and Representation of the People Act 1918 (7 & 8 Geo. 5. c. 64))
Greenwich Out-Pensioners Act 1763 (repealed)	3 Geo. 3. c. 16	31 March 1763
An Act to empower the Commissioners or Governors of the Royal Hospital for Seamen at Greenwich, after defraying the necessary Expenses thereof, to provide for such Seamen worn out and become decrepit in the Service of their Country, who shall not be provided for within the said Hospital; and to enable them to receive such Pensions as shall be granted them by the said Commissioners or Governors, in the most easy and convenient Manner; and for preventing Frauds and Abuses attending the same. (Repealed by Greenwich Hospital Outpensions, etc. Act 1829 (10 Geo. 4. c. 26))
Supply, etc. Act 1763 (repealed)	3 Geo. 3. c. 17	12 April 1763
An Act for raising a certain Sum of Money, by Loans or Exchequer Bills, for the Service of the Year One Thousand Seven Hundred and Sixty-three; and for further appropriating the Supplies granted in this Session of Parliament; and for allowing His Majesty's Subjects to import their Goods and Effects, being the Produce of certain Places ceded to France and Spain by the late Treaty of Peace, (Note: This was the Treaty of Paris (1763).) upon Payment of the same Duties as they would have been liable to if such Places had remained in His Majesty's Possession. (Repealed by Statute Law Revision Act 1867 (30 & 31 Vict. c. 59))
Supply, etc. (No. 2) Act 1763 (repealed)	3 Geo. 3. c. 18	12 April 1763
An Act for granting to His Majesty a certain Sum of Money, out of the Sinking Fund; and for applying certain Monies remaining in the Exchequer for the Service of the Year One Thousand Seven Hundred and Sixty-three. (Repealed by Statute Law Revision Act 1867 (30 & 31 Vict. c. 59))
Small Debts (Wiltshire) Act 1763 (repealed)	3 Geo. 3. c. 19	12 April 1763
An Act for the more easy and speedy Recovery of small Debts, within the Hundreds of Bradford; Melksham, and Whorlsdown, in the County of Wilts. (Repealed by Bradford (Wiltshire), &c. Court of Requests Act 1807 (47 Geo. 3 Sess. 2. c. xxxix) and County Courts Act 1846 (9 & 10 Vict. c. 95))
Grease Butter from Ireland Act 1763 (repealed)	3 Geo. 3. c. 20	19 April 1763
An Act for permitting the Importation from Ireland of stale and dirty Butter, not fit for Eating, commonly called Grease Butter. (Repealed by Statute Law Revision Act 1867 (30 & 31 Vict. c. 59))
Silk Works Act 1763 (repealed)	3 Geo. 3. c. 21	19 April 1763
An Act for explaining, amending, and rendering more effectual, an Act made in the Nineteenth Year of the Reign of King Henry the Seventh, intituled, "Silk Works." (Note: Silk Works Act 1503 (19 Hen. 7. c. 21)) (Repealed by Customs Law Repeal Act 1825 (6 Geo. 4. c. 105))
Customs Act 1763 or the Revenue of Customs Act 1763 (repealed)	3 Geo. 3. c. 22	19 April 1763
An Act for the further Improvement of His Majesty's Revenue of Customs; and for the Encouragement of Officers making Seizures; and for the Prevention of the clandestine Running of Goods into any Part of His Majesty's Dominions. (Repealed by Customs Law Repeal Act 1825 (6 Geo. 4. c. 105))
London Streets Act 1763 (repealed)	3 Geo. 3. c. 23	19 April 1763
An Act to explain, amend, and render more effectual, an Act made in the last Session of Parliament, intituled, "An Act for paving, cleansing, and lighting, the Squares, Streets, and Lanes, within the City and Liberty of Westminster, the Parishes of Saint Giles in the Fields, Saint George the Martyr, Saint George Bloomsbury, that Part of the Parish of Saint Andrew's Holbourn which lies in the County of Middlesex, the several Liberties of The Rolls and Savoy, and that Part of the Dutchy of Lancaster which lies in the County of Middlesex; and for preventing Annoyances therein; and for other Purposes therein mentioned." (Note: London Streets Act 1762 (2 Geo. 3. c. 21)) (Repealed by Tothill Fields Improvement Act 1825 (6 Geo. 4. c. cxxxiv) and United Parishes of St. Andrew Holborn above the Bars and St. George the Martyr Improvement Act 1832 (2 & 3 Will. 4. c. lxvi))
Parliamentary Elections Act 1763 or the Act Against Occasional Freeholders 1763 (repealed)	3 Geo. 3. c. 24	19 April 1763
An Act to prevent fraudulent and occasional Votes in the Elections of Knights of the Shire, and of Members for Cities and Towns which are Counties of themselves, so far as relates to the Right of voting by virtue of an Annuity or Rent Charge. (Repealed by Parliamentary Voters Registration Act 1843 (6 & 7 Vict. c. 18))
Continuance etc. of Acts Act 1763 (repealed)	3 Geo. 3. c. 25	19 April 1763
An Act to continue and amend Two Acts, made in the Twenty-first (Note: Importation of Indigo Act 1747 (21 Geo. 2. c. 30)) and Twenty-eighth (Note: Making of Indigo Act 1755 (28 Geo. 2. c. 25)) Years of His late Majesty's Reign, for encouraging the making of Indico in the British Plantations in America; and for extending the Provisions of an Act of the Thirtieth Year of His late Majesty's Reign, (Note: Prize Goods Act 1757 (30 Geo. 2. c. 18)) with respect to bringing Prize Goods into this Kingdom, to Spanish Prize Goods taken since the late Declaration of War with Spain. (Repealed by Statute Law Revision Act 1867 (30 & 31 Vict. c. 59))
Herts Roads Act 1763 (repealed)	3 Geo. 3. c. 26	21 December 1762
An Act to continue and render more effectual Two Acts of Parliament, for repairing the Roads from Lemsford Mill, through Welwyn and Stevenage, and by Cory's Mill, to Hitchin, and from Welwyn, through Codicot, to Hitchin in the County of Hertford. (Repealed by Bishop's Hatfield and Hitchin, and Welwyn and Hitchin Roads Act 1831 (1 Will. 4. c. xxxvi))
Beds and Herts Roads Act 1763 (repealed)	3 Geo. 3. c. 27	21 December 1762
An Act to continue and render more effectual Two Acts of Parliament, for repairing and widening the Road leading from The Black Bull Inn in Dunstable in the County of Bedford, to the Way turning out of the said Road up to Shafford House in the County of Hertford. (Repealed by Bedford and Hertford Roads Act 1786 (26 Geo. 3. c. 130))
Aberbrothock Beer Duties Act 1763 (repealed)	3 Geo. 3. c. 28	24 March 1763
An Act for continuing an Act passed in the Eleventh Year of His late Majesty King George the Second, intituled, "An Act for laying a Duty of Two Pennies Scots, or One Sixth Part of a Penny Sterling, upon every Scots Pint of Ale and Beer which shall be brewed for Sale, brought into, vended, tapped, or sold, within the Town of Aberbrothock, and Liberties thereof." (Note: Aberbrothock Beer Duties Act 1737 (11 Geo. 2. c. 4)) (Repealed by Statute Law Revision Act 1948 (11 & 12 Geo. 6. c. 62))
Fyfield, St. John's and Newbridge Road Act 1763 (repealed)	3 Geo. 3. c. 29	24 March 1763
An Act for enlarging the Term and Powers granted by Two Acts of Parliament, of the Sixth (Note: Fyfield and St. John's Bridge Road Act 1732 (6 Geo. 2. c. 16)) and Twelfth (Note: Berkshire Roads Act 1738 (12 Geo. 2. c. 11)) Years of His late Majesty's Reign, for repairing the Road from Fyfield in the County of Berks, to St. John's Bridge in the County of Gloucester, and from an Inn called The Hind's Head in the Parish of Kingston Bagpuze in the said County of Berks, to that Part of Newbridge which stands in the said County of Berks; and for rendering the said Acts more effectual. (Repealed by Fyfield and St. John's Bridge Road Act 1812 (52 Geo. 3. c. cxcix) and Fyfield and St. John's Bridge, and Kingston Bagpuize and Newbridge Roads Act 1833 (3 & 4 Will. 4. c. xci))
Cambridge and Newmarket Road Act 1763 (repealed)	3 Geo. 3. c. 30	24 March 1763
An Act to enlarge the Term and Powers granted by an Act made in the Eighteenth Year of the Reign of His late Majesty King George the Second, intituled, "An Act to repair and widen the Road leading from Godmanchester in the County of Huntingdon, through Fen Stanton and Cambridge, to the First Rubbing House on Newmarket Heath, in the County of Cambridge." (Note: Huntingdonshire and Cambridgeshire Roads Act 1744 (18 Geo. 2. c. 23)) (Repealed by Godmanchester and Cambridge Road Act 1813 (53 Geo. 3. c. xli) and Cambridge to Newmarket Heath Road Act 1815 (55 Geo. 3. c. xlix))
Bolton and Nightingale's Road Act 1763 (repealed)	3 Geo. 3. c. 31	24 March 1763
An Act for repairing and widening the Road from a Place called Nightingales in the Township of Heath Charnock, to the Bridge at the West End of the Town of Bolton in the Moors, in the County Palatine of Lancaster. (Repealed by Nightingale's and Bolton Road Act 1805 (45 Geo. 3. c. xiv))
Newmarket and Cambridge Road Act 1763 (repealed)	3 Geo. 3. c. 32	24 March 1763
An Act for repairing the Roads from Newmarket, over Newmarket Heath, to the Turnpike Road leading to Stump Cross, in the Counties of Cambridge and Suffolk. (Repealed by Newmarket Heath Road Act 1829 (10 Geo. 4. c. liii))
Kirby Kendal and Kirby Ireleth Road Act 1763 (repealed)	3 Geo. 3. c. 33	24 March 1763
An Act for repairing, widening, and keeping in Repair, the Road from Kirkby Kendall in the County of Westmorland, to Kirkby Ireleth in the County of Lancaster. (Repealed by Road from Kirkby Kendall to Kirkby Ireleth Act 1820 (1 Geo. 4. c. xviii) and Annual Turnpike Acts Continuance Act 1872 (35 & 36 Vict. c. 85))
Carmarthen and Pembroke Roads Act 1763 (repealed)	3 Geo. 3. c. 34	24 March 1763
An Act for repairing, widening, and keeping in Repair, the High Road leading from the Fourteen Mile Stone in the Parish of Mothvey in the County of Carmarthen, through Llandovery, to Llydiad y Gwyn in the Parish of Llandilo-vawr, and from thence by Cledsulch, and over Duless Bridge to the Town of Llandilo-vawr; and from the said Town, along the Post Road by Rhwyradar, through the County Borough of Carmarthen and Village of Saint Clears, to Tavern Spite in the Parish of Kiffig at the Borders of the County of Pembroke. (Repealed by Carmarthen Roads Act 1803 (43 Geo. 3. c. xxx), Carmarthen Roads Act 1812 (52 Geo. 3. c. cli) and Main Trust Roads (Carmarthen) Act 1828 (9 Geo. 4. c. lxxvi))
Barnstaple Roads Act 1763 (repealed)	3 Geo. 3. c. 35	24 March 1763
An Act for repairing, widening, and keeping in Repair, several Roads leading from the Town of Barnstaple, in the County of Devon. (Repealed by Barnstaple Roads Act 1827 (7 & 8 Geo. 4. c. xiv))
Cambridge and Ely Roads Act 1763 (repealed)	3 Geo. 3. c. 36	24 March 1763
An Act for repairing, widening, turning, and keeping in Repair, the Road from the Town of Cambridge to Ely, and from thence to Soham; and for building a Bridge cross the River Ouze, at or near a Place called Stretham Ferry, in the County of Cambridge. (Repealed by Cambridge to Downham Road Act 1804 (44 Geo. 3. c. lxx) and Cambridge and Ely Roads Act 1824 (5 Geo. 4. c. lx) (Note: Incorrectly cited as "5 Geo. 4. c. clx" in the Chronological Table of the Statutes.))
Highgate and Chipping Barnet Road Act 1763 (repealed)	3 Geo. 3. c. 37	24 March 1763
An Act to continue and render more effectual several Acts of Parliament, for repairing the Road from Highgate Gate-house in the County of Middlesex to Barnet Block-house in the County of Hertford, and the Road from The Bear Inn in Hadley to The Angel in Enfield Chace; and also Canewood Lane leading from Highgate to Hampstead, in the said County of Middlesex; and for repairing and widening the Road, being Part of the Great North Road from London, beginning at Barnet Block-house, and ending at The Bear Inn in Hadley aforesaid. (Repealed by Highgate and South Mimms Road Act 1815 (55 Geo. 3. c. l))
Totnes Roads Act 1763 (repealed)	3 Geo. 3. c. 38	24 March 1763
An Act for amending and widening several Roads leading from or near the North End of the Town and Borough of Totnes, in the County of Devon. (Repealed by Newton Bushell, South Bovey and Moretonhampstead Roads Act 1826 (7 Geo. 4. c. xcii))
Louth Navigation Act 1763 (repealed)	3 Geo. 3. c. 39	24 March 1763
An Act for making a Navigation from the River Humber, by a Canal, or Cut, at or near Tetney Haven, to the River Ludd, in the Parish of Alvingham, in the County of Lincoln; and for continuing the said Navigation, in or near the said River, from thence to or near the Town of Louth, in the said County. (Repealed by Louth Navigation Act 1828 (9 Geo. 4. c. xxx))
Bethnal Green (Poor Relief) Act 1763 (repealed)	3 Geo. 3. c. 40	24 March 1763
An Act for maintaining, regulating, and employing, the Poor within the Parish of St. Matthew Bethnal Green, in the County of Middlesex. (Repealed by London Government (Borough of Bethnal Green) Order in Council 1901 (SR&O 1901/212))
Coventry Improvement Act 1763	3 Geo. 3. c. 41	24 March 1763
An Act for paving, lighting, and cleansing, the City of Coventry and its Suburbs, for preventing Annoyances therein, and for better ordering the publick Wells and Pumps there.
Scarborough Pier Act 1763 (repealed)	3 Geo. 3. c. 42	31 March 1763
An Act for continuing the Duties, and enlarging the Powers, granted by Two Acts made in the Fifth (Note: Scarborough Harbour Act 1731 (5 Geo. 2. c. 11)) and Twenty-fifth (Note: Scarborough Harbour Act 1751 (25 Geo. 2. c. 44)) Years of His late Majesty's Reign, for enlarging the Pier and Harbour of Scarborough, in the County of York. (Repealed by Scarborough Harbour Act 1843 (6 & 7 Vict. c. xl))
Denbigh Roads Act 1763 (repealed)	3 Geo. 3. c. 43	31 March 1763
An Act for repairing, widening, and keeping in Repair, the Road leading from the Turnpike Road between Oswestry and Wrexham, at or near Whithurst's House, through Llangollen, to the most proper and commodious Joining of the Turnpike Road leading from Wrexham to Ruthin, at or near Tavarn Dwyrarch, and from Llangollen aforesaid, through Acre Fair Colliery, to the Finger Post at the Joining of the Road leading from Oswestry to Wrexham, in the County of Denbigh. (Repealed by Montgomery Salop and Denbigh Roads Act 1788 (28 Geo. 3. c. 96))
Flint Roads Act 1763	3 Geo. 3. c. 44	31 March 1763
An Act for repairing and widening the Road, and opening a Communication from the House of Thomas Hughes Esquire adjoining to Halkin Mountain, to Farm; and across the old Post Road in Counsilltfechan to a House at Nanty Moch in Bagillt in the Occupation of Thomas Gill, in the County of Flint.
Lawton, Burslem and Newcastle-under-Lyme Road Act 1763 (repealed)	3 Geo. 3. c. 45	31 March 1763
An Act for repairing and widening the Road from Lawton in the County of Chester, to Burslem and Newcastle under Lyne in the County of Stafford; and other Roads therein mentioned. (Repealed by Lawton, Burslem and Newcastle-under-Lyme Turnpike Roads Act 1859 (22 & 23 Vict. c. lxxxvii))
Maidenhead, Reading, etc. Roads Act 1763 (repealed)	3 Geo. 3. c. 46	31 March 1763
An Act to continue the Term, and enlarge the Powers, of several Acts of Parliament, for repairing the Roads from Maidenhead Bridge to Reading, and from the said Bridge to Henley Bridge, (Note: Henley Bridge in Henley-on-Thames. 51°32′15″N 0°54′01″W) in the County of Berks. (Repealed by Roads from Maidenhead Bridge to Reading and to Henley Bridge Act 1806 (46 Geo. 3. c. cxlv) and Maidenhead, Reading and Henley Road Act 1826 (7 Geo. 4. c. lxx))
Egham and Bagshot Road Act 1763 (repealed)	3 Geo. 3. c. 47	31 March 1763
An Act to enlarge the Term and Powers of Two Acts, passed in the First (Note: Egham and Bagshot Road Act 1727 (1 Geo. 2. St. 2. c. 6)) and Twelfth (Note: Egham and Bagshot Road Act 1738 (12 Geo. 2. c. 16)) Years of the Reign of His late Majesty King George the Second, for repairing the Road from The Powder Mills on Hounslow Heath (Note: The Gunpowder Mills were located in Bedfont on the north of the A315 Staines Road, on Hounslow Heath, to the east of the River Crane. 51°27′32″N 0°24′06″W) in the County of Middlesex, to a Place called Basingstone (Note: The Basing Stone was located near the former Jolly Farmer public house, at the junction of the A30 and A325 roads.) near the Town of Bagshot in the Parish of Windlesham in the County of Surrey. (Repealed by Hounslow Heath and Egham Hill Road Act 1809 (49 Geo. 3. c. lviii) (Note: Incorrectly cited as "49 Geo. 3. c. lvii" in the Chronological Table of the Statutes.) and Egham Hill and Bagshot Road Act 1816 (56 Geo. 3. c. xviii))
York (Lighting and Watching) Act 1763 (repealed)	3 Geo. 3. c. 48	31 March 1763
An Act for the better cleansing and enlightening the Streets, Lanes, and Publick Ways, of the City of York, and the Suburbs thereof, and of the Liberty of Saint Peter within the said City; and for keeping the same in Repair, and free from Annoyance; and for regulating the Hackney Coachmen and Chairmen, Carmen and Draymen, within the same. (Repealed by York Improvement Act 1825 (6 Geo. 4. c. cxxvii))
Caterbury (Church of St. Andrew) Act 1763	3 Geo. 3. c. 49	31 March 1763
An Act for taking down the Parish Church of Saint Andrew, in the City of Canterbury; and for building a new Church in a more convenient Place.
Paddington Improvement Act 1763 (repealed)	3 Geo. 3. c. 50	12 April 1763
An Act for vesting certain Parcels of Land in Paddington in the County of Middlesex in the Rector and Churchwardens of the Parish of Saint George, Hanover Square, in the said County; and appropriating the same for a Burial Ground for the said Parish. (Repealed by London Government (City of Westminster) Order in Council 1901 (SR&O 1901/278))
Worcester and Salop Roads Act 1763 (repealed)	3 Geo. 3. c. 51	12 April 1763
An Act to amend and render more effectual so much of an Act passed in the last Session of Parliament, intituled, "An Act for amending and widening the Road from the Market House in Stourbridge to Colly Gate in Cradley, and from Pedmore to Holly Hall, and from Colly Gate to Halesowen, and from the Turnpike Road on Dudley Wood to Rednal Green in the Parish of King's Norton, and from Carter's Lane to The Bell Inn at Northfield, in the Counties of Worcester, Stafford, and Salop," (Note: Worcester and Salop Roads Act 1762 (2 Geo. 3. c. 78)) as relates to the Road from the Turnpike Road on Dudley Wood to Rednal Green, and from Carter's Lane to The Bell Inn at Northfield. (Repealed by Roads from Bridgnorth to Cleobury Mortimer Act 1825 (6 Geo. 4. c. xlix))
Penryn and Redruth Roads Act 1763 (repealed)	3 Geo. 3. c. 52	12 April 1763
An Act for amending and widening the Roads leading from New Street and Pig Street in Penryn in the County of Cornwall, to Redruth in the same County. (Repealed by Penryn and Redruth Roads Act 1827 (7 & 8 Geo. 4. c. xviii))
Whitechapel (Poor Relief) Act 1763 (repealed)	3 Geo. 3. c. 53	19 April 1763
An Act for maintaining, regulating, and employing, the Poor within the Parish of Saint Mary Whitechapel, in the County of Middlesex; for cleansing and lighting the Squares, Streets, Lanes, Alleys, Courts, Yards, and other Open Passages and Places, and regulating and keeping a Nightly Watch, within such Parts of the said Parish as are not within the Liberties of The Tower of London, or City of London; and to enable the Parishioners to raise Money, to defray the Expenses of repairing the said Parish Church. (Repealed by St. Mary's Whitechapel Improvement Act 1806 (46 Geo. 3. c. lxxxix))
Wareham Improvement Act 1763	3 Geo. 3. c. 54	19 April 1763
An Act for the better and more easy re-building of the Town of Wareham, in the County of Dorset; and for determining Differences touching Houses and Buildings burnt down or demolished by reason of the late dreadful Fire there; and for preventing future Danger by Fire.
Newcastle Improvement Act 1763 (repealed)	3 Geo. 3. c. 55	19 April 1763
An Act for lighting the Streets and other Places, and maintaining a regular and Nightly Watch, within the Town and County of the Town of Newcastle upon Tyne; and for regulating the Hackney Coachmen and Chairmen, Cartmen, Porters, and Watermen, within the same. (Repealed by Newcastle-upon-Tyne Lighting and Watching Act 1812 (52 Geo. 3. c. lxxvi) and Newcastle-upon-Tyne Improvement Act 1837 (7 Will. 4 & 1 Vict. c. lxxii))
Gosport Improvement Act 1763 (repealed)	3 Geo. 3. c. 56	19 April 1763
An Act for the better paving of the Streets, and for preventing Nuisances and other Annoyances, in the Town of Gosport, in the County of Southampton. (Repealed by Local Government Board's Provisional Orders Confirmation Act 1874 (No. 3) (37 & 38 Vict. c. lxxxix))
Derby and Uttoxeter Road Act 1763 (repealed)	3 Geo. 3. c. 57	19 April 1763
An Act for continuing and enlarging the Term and Powers of an Act made in the Thirty-second Year of the Reign of His late Majesty King George the Second, (Note: Derby to Newcastle-under-Lyne Road Act 1758 (32 Geo. 2. c. 60)) for repairing and widening the Road from the Town of Derby to the Town of Newcastle under Lyne in the County of Stafford; and for repairing and widening the Road from Cliffebank to Snape Marsh in the Village of Shelton, in the County of Stafford. (Repealed by Newcastle-under-Lyme Roads Act 1823 (4 Geo. 4. c. li), Uttoxeter District of Roads Act 1823 (4 Geo. 4. c. lix) and Road from Derby to Uttoxeter Act 1825 (6 Geo. 4. c. i))
Essex Roads Act 1763 (repealed)	3 Geo. 3. c. 58	19 April 1763
An Act to continue the Term, and enlarge the Powers, of Two Acts of Parliament, for repairing the Highways from Whitechapel Church in the County of Middlesex, to Woodford in the County of Essex; and for enlightening and watching Part of the said Highway, from Whitechapel Church to Stratford; and for repairing the Road through the Parishes of Chigwell and Lambourn, in the County of Essex. (Repealed by St. Mary, Whitechapel Roads Act 1772 (12 Geo. 3. c. 102))
Stafford, Sandon and Eccleshall Road Act 1763 (repealed)	3 Geo. 3. c. 59	19 April 1763
An Act for repairing and widening the Road leading from the Town of Stafford to Sandon in the County of Stafford, and several other Roads in the Counties of Salop and Stafford. (Repealed by Road from Ranton and Ellenhall to the Whitchurch Turnpike near Newport (Salop.) Act 1804 (44 Geo. 3. c. xxv), Roads from Stafford and from Bridgeford Act 1824 (5 Geo. 4. c. lviii) and Bridgnorth (Salop.) and Shiffnall Road Act 1825 (6 Geo. 4. c. viii))

=== Private acts ===
Short title	Citation	Royal assent
Long title
John Earl of Sandwich, Robert Nugent and Richard Rigby oaths of office.	3 Geo. 3. c. 6 Pr.	24 March 1763
An Act to enable John Earl of Sandwich, Robert Nugent Esquire, and Richard Rigby Esquire, to take, in Great Britain, the Oath of Office, as Vice Treasurer and Receiver General and Paymaster General of all His Majesty's Revenues in the Kingdom of Ireland; and to qualify themselves for the Enjoyment of the said Offices.
Extinguishing the right of average in all ancient inclosures in Clifton and Bootham (Yorkshire) and for inclosing Clifton Common and Moor.	3 Geo. 3. c. 7 Pr.	24 March 1763
An Act for extinguishing the Right of Average in and upon all the ancient Enclosures in the Township of Clifton in the County of York, and in Bootham in the Suburbs of the City of York; and for dividing and enclosing the Common and Moor of Clifton aforesaid.
Woodford Inclosure Act 1763	3 Geo. 3. c. 8 Pr.	24 March 1763
An Act for dividing and enclosing the Open and Common Fields, Common Meadows, Common Pastures, Common Grounds, and Waste Grounds, in the Manor and Parish of Woodford, in the County of Northampton.
Greetham Inclosure Act 1763	3 Geo. 3. c. 9 Pr.	24 March 1763
An Act for dividing and enclosing the Open and Common Fields, Heath, and Waste Grounds, within the Manor and Parish of Greetham, in the County of Rutland.
Evenwood and St. Helen's Auckland Inclosure Act 1763	3 Geo. 3. c. 10 Pr.	24 March 1763
An Act for enlarging the Times appointed by an Act passed in the Second Year of the Reign of His present Majesty, (Note: Evenwood and St. Helen's Auckland Inclosure Act 1762 (2 Geo. 3. c. 43 Pr.)) for dividing and enclosing a certain Moor or Common within the Manor of Evenwood and Chapelry of Saint Helen's Auckland and County of Durham, for certain Arbitrators therein named to make their Awards, and for certain Commissioners therein mentioned to set out, divide, and allot, the said Moor or Common.
Draycott Inclosure Act 1763	3 Geo. 3. c. 11 Pr.	24 March 1763
An Act for dividing and enclosing the Common Fields, Common Meadows, Common Pastures, Common Grounds, and Commonable Lands, in the Manor of Draycott, in the Parish of Wilne, in the County of Derby.
Scropton Inclosure Act 1763	3 Geo. 3. c. 12 Pr.	24 March 1763
An Act for dividing and enclosing the several Open and Common Fields, Common Meadows, Commons and Waste Grounds, within the Manor and Parish of Scropton, in the County of Derby.
Lowton Inclosure Act 1763	3 Geo. 3. c. 13 Pr.	24 March 1763
An Act for dividing and enclosing several Commons and Waste Grounds within the Manor and Township of Lowton, in the County of Lancaster.
Astley Inclosure Act 1763	3 Geo. 3. c. 14 Pr.	24 March 1763
An Act for dividing, enclosing, and allotting, the Commons and Waste Grounds, Moss Rooms, and Parcels of Moss Grounds, within the Manor and Township of Astley, in the County Palatine of Lancaster.
Sutton in Holderness Inclosure Act 1763	3 Geo. 3. c. 15 Pr.	24 March 1763
An Act for enclosing and dividing several Lands and Grounds in the Parish of Sutton in Holderness, in the County of York.
Wellingore Inclosure Act 1763	3 Geo. 3. c. 16 Pr.	24 March 1763
An Act for enclosing and dividing the Common Fields and Pasture Ground in the Manor and Parish of Wellingore, in the County of Lincoln.
Neal's Estate Act 1763	3 Geo. 3. c. 17 Pr.	24 March 1763
An Act for explaining and amending a Power given by the Marriage Settlement of Nathaniel Neal Gentleman and Elizabeth his Wife; and for making the same more effectual, for the Benefit of the Children of that Marriage.
Lade's Estate Act 1763	3 Geo. 3. c. 18 Pr.	24 March 1763
An Act for vesting Part of the settled Estate of John Lade the Younger and Hester his Wife, situate at Barham, in the County of Kent, in Trustees, to be sold; and for laying out the Money to arise by such Sale in the Purchase of other Lands, to be settled to the same Uses.
Hazeland Divorce Act 1763	3 Geo. 3. c. 19 Pr.	24 March 1763
An Act to dissolve the Marriage of William Hazeland Clerk with Mary Walley his now Wife; and to enable him to marry again; and for other Purposes therein mentioned.
Medlycott's Name Act 1763	3 Geo. 3. c. 20 Pr.	24 March 1763
An Act for enabling Anne Barbara Hill Medlycott to take and use the Surname and Arms of Medlycott, pursuant to the Will of Thomas Medlycott Esquire, deceased.
Reessen's Naturalization Act 1763	3 Geo. 3. c. 21 Pr.	24 March 1763
An Act for naturalizing Jacob Reessen.
Child's Naturalization Act 1763	3 Geo. 3. c. 22 Pr.	24 March 1763
An Act for naturalizing Josiah Child, an Infant of the Age of Nine Years.
Naturalization of Samuel Chollet, John Bize, and Samuel Grellet.	3 Geo. 3. c. 23 Pr.	24 March 1763
An Act for naturalizing Samuel Chollet, John Francis Gabriel Bize, and Samuel Grellet.
Huber's Naturalization Act 1763	3 Geo. 3. c. 24 Pr.	24 March 1763
An Act for naturalizing Abraham Huber.
Naturalization of Rudolph Chaillet and Abraham du Bois.	3 Geo. 3. c. 25 Pr.	24 March 1763
An Act for naturalizing Rodolff Nicholas Chaillet and Abraham Du Bois.
Naturalization of John D'Orville, Michael Wiegand, John and Cornelius Kettler and James Shedel.	3 Geo. 3. c. 26 Pr.	24 March 1763
An Act for naturalizing John D'Orville, Michael Wiegand, John Vollraht Kettler, Cornelius Gerhard Kettler, and James Shedel.
Duke of Bedford's Estate Act 1763	3 Geo. 3. c. 27 Pr.	31 March 1763
An Act for vesting certain Lands, Tenements, Rents, and Hereditaments, in the Parish of Tavistock in the County of Devon, and elsewhere, in his Grace John Duke of Bedford; and for settling and assuring in Lieu thereof a Rent Charge, of greater Value, to be issuing out of Lands and Tenements belonging to the said Duke, for the Purposes in the Bill mentioned.
Pirton Inclosure Act 1763	3 Geo. 3. c. 28 Pr.	31 March 1763
An Act for dividing and enclosing several Open and Common Fields, Lands, and Waste Grounds, within the Manor and Parish of Pirton, in the County of Worcester.
Childswickam Inclosure Act 1763	3 Geo. 3. c. 29 Pr.	31 March 1763
An Act for dividing and enclosing the Open and Common Fields, Common Meadows, and Commonable Lands, within the Parish of Childswickham, in the County of Gloucester.
Marfleet in Holderness Inclosure Act 1763	3 Geo. 3. c. 30 Pr.	31 March 1763
An Act for dividing and enclosing the Common Fields, Pastures, and Common Grounds, in the Chapelry and Lordship of Marfleet in Holderness, in the County of York.
Litton Inclosure Act 1763	3 Geo. 3. c. 31 Pr.	31 March 1763
An Act for dividing and enclosing the Commons, Common Pastures, and Common Fields, in the Manor of Litton, in the Parish of Tideswell, in the County of Derby.
Pilham Inclosure Act 1763	3 Geo. 3. c. 32 Pr.	31 March 1763
An Act for dividing and allotting certain Open Fields, Meadows, and Stinted Pastures, in the Township and Parish of Pilham, in the County of Lincoln.
Stone Inclosure Act 1763	3 Geo. 3. c. 33 Pr.	12 April 1763
An Act for dividing and enclosing Stone Common, within the Manor and Parish of Stone, in the County of Worcester.
Merton Inclosure Act 1763	3 Geo. 3. c. 34 Pr.	12 April 1763
An Act for dividing and enclosing the Open and Common Fields in the Township of Merton, in the County of Oxford; and for making a Compensation for Common of Pasture and Tithes arising therein.
Blyth's Benefaction Act 1763 (repealed)	3 Geo. 3. c. 35 Pr.	12 April 1763
An Act to enable the Master, Fellows, and Scholars, of the College of Clarehall in the University of Cambridge, to alter and vary the Benefaction of Doctor Blyth; and to appropriate the same, for the Benefit of the said College, in the Augmentation of the Vicarages of Everton with Tetworth and Great Gransden, in the Counties of Bedford and Huntingdon. (Repealed by Blyth's Benefaction Act 1825 (6 Geo. 4. c. 70))
Edmund Proby's Benefaction Act 1763 (repealed)	3 Geo. 3. c. 36 Pr.	12 April 1763
An Act to enable the Master, Fellows, and Scholars, of Jesus College in the University of Cambridge, to alter and vary the Benefaction of Doctor Edmund Proby and Sir Thomas Proby; and to appropriate the same, for the Benefit of the said College, in the Augmentation of several small Rectories and Vicarages. (Repealed by Jesus College, Proby Trust Act 1853 (16 & 17 Vict. c. 17)))
Vesting lands in Essex and Cambridgeshire belonging to Jesus College Cambridge in Sir William Maynard and heirs.	3 Geo. 3. c. 37 Pr.	12 April 1763
An Act for vesting certain Lands in the Counties of Essex and Cambridge, belonging to the Master, Fellows, and Scholars, of the College called Jesus College in the University of Cambridge, in Sir William Maynard Baronet and his Heirs.
Dashwood's Estate Act 1763	3 Geo. 3. c. 38 Pr.	12 April 1763
An Act for vesting Part of the settled Estates of Samuel Dashwood Esquire in Trustees, for raising Money to pay Debts and Encumbrances; and for providing an Equivalent or Compensation for the same to the Issue inheritable under his Marriage Settlement.
Joye's Estate Act 1763	3 Geo. 3. c. 39 Pr.	12 April 1763
An Act for vesting several Messuages, Lands, and Tenements, late the Estate of James Joye Esquire, deceased, situate in the Parish of Saint Mary le Strand; in the County of Middlesex, in new Trustees; and to enable them to make Building Leases thereof.
Rich's Estate Act 1763	3 Geo. 3. c. 40 Pr.	12 April 1763
An Act for Sale of certain Messuages, Lands, and Tenements, in North Cerney in the County of Gloucester, late the Estate of Edward Pickering Rich, pursuant to an Agreement; and for applying the Purchase-money in discharging Encumbrances affecting the same; and for the Benefit of Thomas Rich, his Son and Heir, an Infant.
Winster Inclosure Act 1763	3 Geo. 3. c. 41 Pr.	19 April 1763
An Act for dividing and enclosing the Common Moor, or Waste Ground, within the Hamlet of Winster, in the Parish of Youlgreave, in the County of Derby.
Glentham Inclosure Act 1763	3 Geo. 3. c. 42 Pr.	19 April 1763
An Act for dividing and enclosing several Common Fields and Grounds within the Parish of Glentham, in the County of Lincoln.
York Buildings Waterworks Corporation (Scottish Estates) Act 1763	3 Geo. 3. c. 43 Pr.	19 April 1763
An Act for carrying into Execution an Agreement entered into, between the Governor and Company of Undertakers for raising the Thames Water in York Buildings, the Trustees for Annuitants on Lives, William Lock Esquire, his Grace Edward Duke of Norfolk and Partners, Sir Andrew Chadwick Knight, and the Reverend Samuel-Grove Clerk, all Real Creditors of the said Governor and Company; and for authorizing and directing the Court of Session in Scotland to proceed to a Sale of such Parts of the Estates of Marischal, Panmure, Southesk, and others, pursuant to the said Agreement, as were leased to Sir Archibald Grant Baronet and Alexander Garden Esquire.
Duke of Marlborough's Estates Act 1763	3 Geo. 3. c. 44 Pr.	19 April 1763
An Act to discharge certain Manors and Lands in the County of Bedford, the Estates of the most Noble George Duke of Marlborough, from certain Trusts and Agreements created and entered into by the said Duke, whereby the said Estates were to be settled on Lord Charles Spencer, Brother of the said Duke, and his Issue, in strict Settlement; and for settling other Lands and Hereditaments, in the County of Oxford, in Lieu thereof; and likewise for varying, and carrying into Execution, certain other Trusts and Agreements of the said Duke, for the making a Settlement of certain Manors and Lands in the County of Lincoln upon Lord Robert Spencer, now an Infant, another Brother of the said Duke, and his Issue, in like strict Settlement; and for other Purposes.
Lord Coleraine's Estate Act 1763	3 Geo. 3. c. 45 Pr.	19 April 1763
An Act to enable His Majesty to grant certain Estates, devised by the Will of Henry late Lord Coleraine in the Kingdom of Ireland, deceased, to Trustees, in Trust, for Henrietta Rosa Peregrina Hare and her Heirs, subject to the Uses, Limitations, and Provisions, mentioned in the said Will; and to Two Annuities, payable to Rose Duplessis; and also to certain Sums, payable to Robert Knight, and to Henry Knight, and Anne the Wife of William Basset; and for other Purposes in the said Act mentioned.
Authorizing the executors of John Hope to assign to trustees £20,000 of stock or capital, part of the marriage portion of Jane Paterson, to be employed for purposes therein expressed.	3 Geo. 3. c. 46 Pr.	19 April 1763
An Act for authorizing the Executors of John Hope to assign to Trustees Twenty Thousand Pounds of the Stock or Capital therein mentioned, Part of the Marriage Portion of Jane the Wife of John Paterson Esquire, to be employed in Manner, and for the Purposes, therein expressed.

=== Sources ===
- Pickering, Danby, ed. (1763). "Anno tertio Georgii III". The Statutes at Large. Vol. 25. Joseph Bentham. pp. 229–364 – via Internet Archive.
- "Anno tertio Georgii III". The Statutes at Large. Vol. 25. Joseph Bentham. 1763. pp. 229–364 – via Google Books.
- Pickering, Danby, ed. (1763). "Anno tertio Georgii III". The Statutes at Large. Vol. 25. Joseph Bentham. pp. 229–364 – via Internet Archive.
- Journals of the House of Commons. Vol. 29. London: His Majesty's Stationery Office. 1803. pp. 353–666 – via Google Books.
- Chronological Table of and Index to the Statutes. Vol. 1: To the End of the Session 59 Vict. Sess. 2 (1895) (13th ed.). London: Her Majesty's Stationery Office. 1896. p. 121 – via Google Books.

== 4 Geo. 3 ==
The third session of the 12th Parliament of Great Britain, which met from 15 November 1763 until 19 April 1764.

This session was also traditionally cited as 4 G. 3.

=== Public acts ===
Short title	Citation	Royal assent
Long title
Malt Duties etc. Act 1763 (repealed)	4 Geo. 3. c. 1	19 December 1763
An Act for continuing, and granting to His Majesty, certain Duties upon Malt, (Note: Malt tax.) Mum, Cyder, and Perry, for the Service of the Year One Thousand Seven Hundred and Sixty-four. (Repealed by Statute Law Revision Act 1867 (30 & 31 Vict. c. 59))
Land Tax Act 1763 (repealed)	4 Geo. 3. c. 2	19 December 1763
An Act for granting an Aid to His Majesty, by a Land Tax, to be raised in Great Britain, for the Service of the Year One Thousand Seven Hundred and Sixty-four. (Repealed by Statute Law Revision Act 1867 (30 & 31 Vict. c. 59))
Mutiny Act 1763 (repealed)	4 Geo. 3. c. 3	25 January 1764
An Act for punishing Mutiny and Desertion; and for the better Payment of the Army and their Quarters. (Repealed by Statute Law Revision Act 1867 (30 & 31 Vict. c. 59))
Naturalisation Act 1763 (repealed)	4 Geo. 3. c. 4	25 January 1764
An Act for exhibiting a Bill in this present Parliament, for naturalizing his Highness the Hereditary Prince of Brunswick Lunenburg. (Repealed by Statute Law Revision Act 1867 (30 & 31 Vict. c. 59))
Royal Family Act 1763 (repealed)	4 Geo. 3. c. 5	21 March 1764
An Act for naturalizing his Highness Charles William Ferdinand, Hereditary Prince of Brunswick Lunenburg. (Repealed by Statute Law Revision Act 1948 (11 & 12 Geo. 6. c. 62))
Importation Act 1763 (repealed)	4 Geo. 3. c. 6	21 March 1764
An Act to continue, for a limited Time, the free Importation of Tallow, Hogs Lard, and Grease, from Ireland. (Repealed by Statute Law Revision Act 1867 (30 & 31 Vict. c. 59))
Cider and Perry Act 1763 (repealed)	4 Geo. 3. c. 7	21 March 1764
An Act to explain and amend such Part of an Act made in the last Session of Parliament (intituled, "An Act for granting to His Majesty several additional Duties upon Wines imported into this Kingdom; and certain Duties upon all Cyder and Perry; and for raising the Sum of Three Millions Five Hundred Thousand Pounds, by Way of Annuities and Lotteries, to be charged on the said Duties") (Note: National Debt (No. 2) Act 1762 (3 Geo. 3. c. 12)) as relates to Cyder and Perry made in this Kingdom. (Repealed by Duties on Cider, etc. Act 1766 (6 Geo. 3. c. 14))
Marine Mutiny Act 1763 (repealed)	4 Geo. 3. c. 8	21 March 1764
An Act for the Regulation of His Majesty's Marine Forces while on Shore. (Repealed by Statute Law Revision Act 1867 (30 & 31 Vict. c. 59))
Customs Act 1763 (repealed)	4 Geo. 3. c. 9	5 April 1764
An Act for repealing the Duties now payable upon Beaver Skins imported, and for granting other Duties in Lieu thereof; and for granting certain Duties upon the Exportation of Beaver Skins and Beaver Wool; and for taking off the Drawback allowed on the Exportation of such Skins. (Repealed by Statute Law Revision Act 1867 (30 & 31 Vict. c. 59))
Recognizances (Discharge) Act 1764 (repealed)	4 Geo. 3. c. 10	5 April 1764
An Act for the more easy Discharge of Recognizances estreated into His Majesty's Court of Exchequer. (Repealed by Statute Law Revision Act 1948 (11 & 12 Geo. 6. c. 62))
Continuance of Laws Act 1763 (repealed)	4 Geo. 3. c. 11	5 April 1764
An Act for continuing certain Laws therein mentioned, relating to British Sail-cloth, and to the Duties payable on Foreign Sail-cloth, and to the Allowance upon the Exportation of British made Gunpowder; and for giving further Encouragement for the Importation of Naval Stores from the British Colonies in America. (Repealed by Statute Law Revision Act 1867 (30 & 31 Vict. c. 59))
Continuance of Laws (No. 2) Act 1763 (repealed)	4 Geo. 3. c. 12	5 April 1764
An Act to continue several Laws, for the better regulating of Pilots for the conducting of Ships and Vessels from Dover, Deal, and Isle of Thanet, up the Rivers of Thames and Medway; relating to the landing of Rum or Spirits of the British Sugar Plantations before the Duties of Excise are paid thereon; and to the further Punishment of Persons going armed or disguised, in Defiance of the Laws of Customs or Excise; and to the Relief of the Officers of the Customs in Informations upon Seizures; and for granting a Liberty to carry Sugars, of the Growth, Produce, or Manufacture, of any of His Majesty's Sugar Colonies, directly into Foreign Parts, in Ships built in Great Britain, and navigated according to Law; and for punishing Persons who shall damage or destroy any Banks, Flood-gates, Sluices, or other Works, belonging to Rivers and Streams made navigable by Act of Parliament. (Repealed for England and Wales by Criminal Statutes Repeal Act 1827 (7 & 8 Geo. 4. c. 27) and for India by Criminal Law (India) Act 1828 (9 Geo. 4. c. 74))
Supply, etc. Act 1763 (repealed)	4 Geo. 3. c. 13	5 April 1764
An Act for granting to His Majesty a certain Sum of Money, out of the Sinking Fund, for the Service of the Year One Thousand Seven Hundred and Sixty-four; (Note: A loan of £2 million.) and for preventing, in certain Cases, the obtaining of Allowances in respect of the Leakage of Wines imported into this Kingdom; and for making forth Duplicates of Exchequer Bills, Tickets, Certificates, Receipts, Annuity Orders, and other Orders, lost, burnt, or otherwise destroyed. (Repealed by Statute Law Revision Act 1867 (30 & 31 Vict. c. 59))
Regulation of Buildings Act 1763 or the Building Act 1764 (repealed)	4 Geo. 3. c. 14	5 April 1764
An Act for the better regulating of Buildings; and to prevent Mischiefs that may happen by Fire, within the Weekly Bills of Mortality, and other Places therein mentioned. (Repealed by Statute Law Revision Act 1867 (30 & 31 Vict. c. 59))
Sugar Act 1763 or the Sugar Act 1764 or the American Revenue Act 1764 or the American Duties Act 1764 (repealed)	4 Geo. 3. c. 15	5 April 1764
An Act for granting certain Duties in the British Colonies and Plantations in America; for continuing, amending, and making perpetual, an Act passed in the Sixth Year of the Reign of His late Majesty King George the Second (intituled, "An Act for the better securing and encouraging the Trade of His Majesty's Sugar Colonies in America"); (Note: Trade of Sugar Colonies Act 1732 (6 Geo. 2. c. 13)) for applying the Produce of such Duties, and of the Duties to arise by virtue of the said Act, towards defraying the Expenses of defending, protecting, and securing, the said Colonies and Plantations; for explaining an Act made in the Twenty-fifth Year of the Reign of King Charles the Second, (intituled, "An Act for the Encouragement of the Greenland and Eastland Trades; and for the better securing the Plantation Trade"); (Note: Trade Act 1672 (25 Cha. 2. c. 7)) and for altering and disallowing several Drawbacks on Exports from this Kingdom, and more effectually preventing the clandestine Conveyance of Goods to and from the said Colonies and Plantations, and improving and securing the Trade between the same and Great Britain. (Repealed by Statute Law Revision Act 1867 (30 & 31 Vict. c. 59))
Infant Trustees and Mortgages Act 1763 (repealed)	4 Geo. 3. c. 16	5 April 1764
An Act to enable Infants, who are seised of Lands, Tenements, or Hereditaments, within the Dutchy of Lancaster, or the Counties Palatine of Chester, Lancaster, or Durham, or the Principality of Wales, in Fee, or for the Life or Lives of One or more other Person or Persons, in Trust, or by Way of Mortgage, to make Conveyances of such Estates, by Order of the Court of the Dutchy Chamber of Lancaster, of the Court of Exchequer of the County Palatine of Chester, the Court of Chancery of the County Palatine of Lancaster, of the Court of Chancery of the County Palatine of Durham, and of the Courts of the Great Sessions in the Principality of Wales. (Repealed by Infants, Lunatics, etc. Act 1825 (6 Geo. 4. c. 74))
Militia Act 1763 (repealed)	4 Geo. 3. c. 17	19 April 1764
An Act to explain and amend an Act, passed in the Second Year of the Reign of His present Majesty, intituled, "An Act to explain, amend, and reduce into One Act of Parliament, the several Laws now in being, relating to the raising and training the Militia within that Part of Great Britain called England." (Note: Militia Act 1762 (2 Geo. 3. c. 20)) (Repealed by Statute Law Revision Act 1867 (30 & 31 Vict. c. 59))
National Debt Act 1763 (repealed)	4 Geo. 3. c. 18	19 April 1764
An Act for charging on the Sinking Fund certain Annuities, granted by an Act passed in the First Year of the Reign of His present Majesty, (Note: National Debt Act 1760 (1 Geo. 3. c. 7)) and for carrying the Duties therein mentioned to the said Fund; and also for consolidating such of the said Annuities as are granted for a certain Term of Years irredeemable, with other Annuities granted by an Act passed in the Second Year of His present Majesty's Reign. (Note: National Debt (No. 2) Act 1761 (2 Geo. 3. c. 10)) (Repealed by Statute Law Revision Act 1870 (33 & 34 Vict. c. 69))
Importation into Quebec Act 1763 (repealed)	4 Geo. 3. c. 19	19 April 1764
An Act for importing Salt from Europe, into the Province of Quebec in America, for a limited Time. (Note: Salt to Quebec.) (Repealed by Customs Law Repeal Act 1825 (6 Geo. 4. c. 105))
Fort of Senegal Act 1763 (repealed)	4 Geo. 3. c. 20	19 April 1764
An Act for vesting the Fort of Senegal and its Dependencies in the Company of Merchants trading to Africa. (Repealed by Statute Law Revision Act 1867 (30 & 31 Vict. c. 59))
Affidavits in County of Durham Act 1763 (repealed)	4 Geo. 3. c. 21	19 April 1764
An Act for taking and swearing Affidavits, to be made Use of in any of the Courts of the County Palatine of Durham. (Repealed by Commissioners for Oaths Act 1889 (52 & 53 Vict. c. 10))
Whale Fishery Act 1763 (repealed)	4 Geo. 3. c. 22	19 April 1764
An Act for continuing several Acts of Parliament, made for the Encouragement of the Whale Fishery carried on by His Majesty's Subjects. (Repealed by Statute Law Revision Act 1867 (30 & 31 Vict. c. 59))
Supply, etc. (No. 2) Act 1763 (repealed)	4 Geo. 3. c. 23	19 April 1764
An Act for raising a certain Sum of Money by Loans or Exchequer Bills; and for applying certain Monies remaining in the Exchequer for the Service of the Year One Thousand Seven Hundred and Sixty-four; and for Application of certain Savings of Publick Monies, and of Monies arisen by the Sale of Military Stores; and for further appropriating the Supplies granted in this Session of Parliament; and for Relief of Persons who have omitted to insert in Indentures, or other Writings, the full Sum agreed to be paid with Clerks, Apprentices, and other Servants. (Repealed by Statute Law Revision Act 1867 (30 & 31 Vict. c. 59))
Postage Act 1763 (repealed)	4 Geo. 3. c. 24	19 April 1764
An Act for preventing Frauds and Abuses in relation to the sending and receiving of Letters and Packets free from the Duty of Postage. (Repealed by Post Office (Repeal of Laws) Act 1837 (7 Will. 4. & 1 Vict. c. 32))
National Debt (No. 2) Act 1763 (repealed)	4 Geo. 3. c. 25	19 April 1764
An Act for establishing an Agreement with the Governor and Company of the Bank of England, for raising certain Sums of Money, towards the Supply for the Service of the Year One Thousand Seven Hundred and Sixty-four; and for more effectually preventing the forging Powers to transfer such Stock, or receive such Dividends or Annuities, as are therein mentioned, and the fraudulent personating the Owners thereof. (Repealed by Statute Law Revision Act 1867 (30 & 31 Vict. c. 59))
Bounty upon Importation Act 1763 (repealed)	4 Geo. 3. c. 26	19 April 1764
An Act for granting a Bounty upon the Importation of Hemp, and rough and undressed Flax, from His Majesty's Colonies in America. (Repealed by Statute Law Revision Act 1867 (30 & 31 Vict. c. 59))
Colonial Trade Act 1763 (repealed)	4 Geo. 3. c. 27	19 April 1764
An Act for granting, for a limited Time, a Liberty to carry Rice from His Majesty's Provinces of South Carolina and Georgia directly to any Part of America to the Southward of the said Provinces, subject to the like Duty as is now paid on the Exportation of Rice from the said Colonies to Places in Europe situate to the Southward of Cape Finisterre. (Repealed by Statute Law Revision Act 1867 (30 & 31 Vict. c. 59))
Importation (No. 2) Act 1763 (repealed)	4 Geo. 3. c. 28	19 April 1764
An Act to enable His Majesty, with the Advice of His Privy Council, to order the free Importation of Provisions from Ireland, during the next Recess of Parliament, under certain Restrictions and Regulations therein mentioned. (Note: Importation of salt provisions from Ireland.) (Note: Importation of provisions from America.) (Repealed by Statute Law Revision Act 1867 (30 & 31 Vict. c. 59))
Whale Fishery (No. 2) Act 1763 (repealed)	4 Geo. 3. c. 29	19 April 1764
An Act for the Encouragement of the Whale Fishery in the Gulph and River of Saint Lawrence, and on the Coasts of His Majesty's Colonies in America. (Repealed by Statute Law Revision Act 1867 (30 & 31 Vict. c. 59))
Militia Pay Act 1763 (repealed)	4 Geo. 3. c. 30	19 April 1764
An Act for applying the Money granted in this Session of Parliament, for defraying the Charge of the Pay and Cloathing of the Militia of that Part of Great Britain called England, for One Year, beginning the Twenty-fifth Day of March, One Thousand Seven Hundred and Sixty-four. (Repealed by Statute Law Revision Act 1867 (30 & 31 Vict. c. 59))
Indemnity Act 1763 (repealed)	4 Geo. 3. c. 31	19 April 1764
An Act to indemnify such Persons as have omitted to qualify themselves for Offices and Employments; and to indemnify Justices of the Peace, Deputy Lieutenants, and Officers of the Militia, or others, who have omitted to register or deliver in their Qualifications within the Time limited by Law, and for giving further Time for those Purposes; and to indemnify Members and Officers, in Cities, Corporations, and Borough Towns, whose Admissions have been omitted to be stamped according to the several Acts of Parliament now in Force for that Purpose, or, having been stamped, have been lost or mislaid; and for allowing them Time to provide Admissions duly stamped; and to prevent the Destruction of Trees and Underwoods growing in Forests and Chaces. (Repealed by Statute Law Revision Act 1887 (50 & 51 Vict. c. 59))
Court of Chancery Act 1763 (repealed)	4 Geo. 3. c. 32	19 April 1764
An Act to empower the High Court of Chancery to lay out upon proper Securities a further Sum of Money, not exceeding a Sum therein limited, out of the Common and General Cash in the Bank of England, belonging to the Suitors of the said Court; and for applying the Interest arising therefrom towards answering the Charges of the Office of the Accomptant General of the said Court. (Repealed by Courts of Justice (Salaries and Funds) Act 1869 (32 & 33 Vict. c. 91))
Bankrupts Act 1763 (repealed)	4 Geo. 3. c. 33	19 April 1764
An Act for preventing Inconveniencies arising in Cases of Merchants, and such other Persons as are within the Description of the Statutes relating to Bankrupts, being entitled to Privilege of Parliament, and becoming insolvent. (Repealed by Bankruptcy Act 1825 (6 Geo. 4. c. 16))
Paper Bills of Credit Act 1763 or the Currency Act 1764 (repealed)	4 Geo. 3. c. 34	19 April 1764
An Act to prevent Paper Bills of Credit, hereafter to be issued, within any of His Majesty's Colonies or Plantations in America, from being declared to be a legal Tender in Payments of Money; and to prevent the legal Tender of such Bills as are now subsisting from being prolonged beyond the Periods limited for calling in and sinking the same. (Repealed by Statute Law Revision Act 1867 (30 & 31 Vict. c. 59))
Hampshire, Kent, Sussex Fortifications Act 1763	4 Geo. 3. c. 35	19 April 1764
An Act for making Compensation to the Proprietors of such Lands and Hereditaments as have been purchased upon the Sea Coasts, in the Counties of Kent, Sussex, and Southampton, on which Forts and Batteries have been erected for Defence of the said Coasts, in Pursuance of an Act passed in the Second Year of the Reign of His present Majesty; (Note: Hampshire, Kent, Sussex Fortifications Act 1762 (2 Geo. 3. c. 37)) and for other Purposes therein mentioned.
Bankrupts, etc. Act 1763 (repealed)	4 Geo. 3. c. 36	19 April 1764
An Act to continue an Act made in the Fifth Year of the Reign of His late Majesty King George the Second, intituled, "An Act to prevent the committing of Frauds by Bankrupts;" (Note: Bankrupts Act 1731 (5 Geo. 2. c. 30)) and for extending the Laws relating to Hackney Coaches to the Counties of Kent and Essex. (Repealed by Statute Law Revision Act 1867 (30 & 31 Vict. c. 59))
Manufacture of Cambrics Act 1763 (repealed)	4 Geo. 3. c. 37	19 April 1764
An Act for the better establishing a Manufactory of Cambricks and Lawns, or Goods of the Kind usually known under those Denominations, now carrying on at Winchilsea, in the County of Sussex; and for improving, regulating, and extending, the Manufacture of Cambricks and Lawns, or Goods of the Kind usually known under those Denominations, in that Part of Great Britain called England. (Repealed by Statute Law Revision Act 1867 (30 & 31 Vict. c. 59))
Papists Act 1763 (repealed)	4 Geo. 3. c. 38	19 April 1764
An Act for allowing further Time for Enrolment of Deeds and Wills made by Papists; and for Relief of Protestant Purchasers. (Repealed by Statute Law Revision Act 1867 (30 & 31 Vict. c. 59))
Westminster Streets Act 1763	4 Geo. 3. c. 39	19 April 1764
An Act to explain, amend, and render more effectual, Two several Acts of Parliament, made in the Second (Note: London Streets Act 1762 (2 Geo. 3. c. 21)) and Third (Note: London Streets Act 1763 (3 Geo. 3. c. 32)) Years of His present Majesty, for paving, cleansing, and lighting, the Squares, Streets, and Lanes, within the City and Liberty of Westminster, and other Places therein mentioned, and for preventing Annoyances therein; and for other Purposes therein mentioned. (Repealed by Tothill Fields Improvement Act 1825 (6 Geo. 4. c. cxxxiv) (Note: Incorrectly cited as "6 Geo. 4. c. cxxiv" in the Chronological Table of the Statutes.) and United Parishes of St. Andrew Holborn above the Bars and St. George the Martyr Improvement Act 1832 (2 & 3 Will. 4. c. lxvi)))
Doncaster Small Debts, Lighting, etc. Act 1763	4 Geo. 3. c. 40	19 April 1764
An Act for the more easy and speedy Recovery of small Debts within the Borough and Soke of Doncaster, in the County of York; and for lighting the Streets, Lanes, and other Open Passages and Places, within the said Borough. (Repealed by Doncaster Improvements Act 1803 (43 Geo. 3. c cxlvii) and County Courts Act 1846 (9 & 10 Vict. c. 95)))

=== Private acts ===
Short title	Citation	Royal assent
Long title
Cassau's Naturalization Act 1763	4 Geo. 3. c. 1 Pr.	19 December 1763
An Act for naturalizing Govert Cassau.
Solinus' Naturalization Act 1763	4 Geo. 3. c. 2 Pr.	19 December 1763
An Act for naturalizing Andrew Solinus.
Naturalization of Peter Hasenclever, Johann Rucker, John Blache, Andrew Vezian, James Granges and Jacob Muller.	4 Geo. 3. c. 3 Pr.	19 December 1763
An Act for naturalizing Peter Hasenclever, Johann Peter Rucker, John Francis Blache, Andrew Vezian, James Charles Granges, and Jacob Muller.
Naturalization of William Dunant, John Schrieber, Jonas Dael and Charles Thalbitzer.	4 Geo. 3. c. 4 Pr.	19 December 1763
An Act for naturalizing William Dunant, John Christian Schreiber, Jonas Dael, and Charles Henry Thalbitzer.

=== Sources ===
- "Anno quarto Georgii III". The Statutes at Large. Vol. 26. 1762. pp. 1–153 – via Internet Archive.
- "Anno quarto Georgii III". The Statutes at Large. Vol. 26. 1764. pp. 1–153 – via Google Books.
- Journals of the House of Commons. Vol. 29. London: His Majesty's Stationery Office. 1803. pp. 667–1058 – via Google Books.
- Chronological Table of and Index to the Statutes. Vol. 1: To the End of the Session 59 Vict. Sess. 2 (1895) (13th ed.). London: Her Majesty's Stationery Office. 1896. p. 121-122 – via Google Books.

== See also ==
- List of acts of the Parliament of Great Britain
