= Elections (Fraudulent Conveyances) Act 1711 =

Act of the Parliament of Great Britain

Elections (Fraudulent Conveyances) Act 1711 (Note: The citation of this act by this short title was authorised by section 1 of, and the first schedule to, the Short Titles Act 1896. Due to the repeal of those provisions it is now authorised by section 19(2) of the Interpretation Act 1978.)
- Act of Parliament
- Parliament of Great Britain
- Long title: An Act for the more effectual preventing fraudulent Conveyances in order to multiply Votes for electing Knights of Shires to serve in Parliament. (Note: These words are printed against this act in the second column of the first schedule to the Short Titles Act 1896, which is headed "Title".)
- Citation: 10 Ann. c. 31 (Note: This is the citation in The Statutes of the Realm.); 10 Ann. c. 23 (Note: This is the citation in The Statutes at Large.)
- Territorial extent: Great Britain

Dates
- Royal assent: 22 May 1712
- Commencement: 7 December 1711 (Note: Start of session.)
- Repealed: 6 February 1918

Other legislation
- Repealed by: Statute Law Revision Act 1867; Representation of the People Act 1918

Status: Repealed

Text of statute as originally enacted

The Elections (Fraudulent Conveyances) Act 1711 (10 Ann. c. 31), sometimes called the Elections (Fraudulent Conveyance) Act 1711, was an act of the Parliament of Great Britain.

The act is chapter 23 in Ruffhead's Edition.

== Subsequent developments ==
The whole act, except section 1, was repealed by section 1 of, and the schedule to, the Statute Law Revision Act 1867 (30 & 31 Vict. c. 59), which came into force on 15 July 1867.

The whole act, so far as unrepealed, was repealed by section 47(1) of, and the eighth schedule to, the Representation of the People Act 1918 (7 & 8 Geo. 5. c. 64).
