= Representation of the People Act 1918 =

Act of the Parliament of the United Kingdom reforming the electoral system

Representation of the People Act 1918 (Note: Section 47(2).)
- Act of Parliament
- Parliament of the United Kingdom
- Long title: An Act to Amend the Law with respect to Parliamentary and Local Government Franchises, and the Registration of Parliamentary and Local Government Electors, and the conduct of elections, and to provide for the Redistribution of Seats at Parliamentary Elections, and for other purposes connected therewith.
- Citation: 7 & 8 Geo. 5. c. 64
- Territorial extent: United Kingdom

Dates
- Royal assent: 6 February 1918
- Commencement: 6 February 1918 (Note: Section 46(1).)
- Repealed: 16 July 1985
Other legislation
Amends	Parliamentary Elections Act 1695
Repeals/revokes	Electors of Knights of the Shires Act 1429; Electors of Knights of the Shire Act 1432; Elections (Fraudulent Conveyances) Act 1711; Parliamentary Elections (Fraudulent Conveyances) Act 1739; Parliamentary Elections Act 1744; Parliamentary Elections Act 1745; Freemen (Admission) Act 1763; Parliamentary Elections Act 1780; Parliamentary Elections Act 1785; Parliamentary Elections Act 1793; Parliamentary Elections Act 1813; Parliamentary Voters Registration Act 1843; Meeting of Parliament Act 1852; University Elections Act 1861; County Voters Registration Act 1865
Amended by	Representation of the People Act 1922; Representation of the People (Equal Franchise) Act 1928; Local Government Act 1933; Parliament (Elections and Meeting) Act 1943; Representation of the People Act 1945; Local Government (Scotland) Act 1947; Representation of the People Act 1948; Peerage Act 1963; Statute Law (Repeals) Act 1978; Representation of the People Act 1983; Representation of the People Act 1985
Repealed by	Representation of the People Act 1985
Relates to	Representation of the People Act 1969

Status: Repealed

Text of statute as originally enacted

The Representation of the People Act 1918 (7 & 8 Geo. 5. c. 64) was an act of the Parliament of the United Kingdom passed to reform the electoral system in Great Britain and Ireland. It is sometimes known as the Fourth Reform Act. The act extended the franchise in parliamentary elections, also known as the right to vote, to men aged over 21, whether or not they owned property, and to women aged over 30 who resided in the constituency whilst occupying land or premises with a rateable value above £5, or whose husbands did. At the same time, it extended the local government franchise to include women aged over 30 on the same terms as men. It came into effect at the 1918 general election.

As a result of the act, the male electorate was extended by 5.2 million to 12.9 million. The female electorate was 8.5 million. The act also created new electoral arrangements, including making residence in a specific constituency the basis of the right to vote and institutionalising the first-past-the-post method of election.

It was not until the Representation of the People (Equal Franchise) Act 1928 (18 & 19 Geo. 5. c. 12) that women gained electoral equality. The 1928 act gave the vote to all women aged over 21, regardless of any property qualification, which added another five million women to the electorate.

== Background ==
After the Third Reform Act in 1884, 60% of male householders over the age of 21 had the vote. This left 40% who did not – including the poorest in society. Thus millions of soldiers returning from World War I would still not have been entitled to vote in the long overdue general election. (The last election had been in December 1910.)

The issue of a female right to vote first gathered momentum during the latter half of the nineteenth century. In 1865, the Kensington Society, a discussion group for middle-class women who were barred from higher education, met at the home of India scholar Charlotte Manning in Kensington. Following a discussion on suffrage, a small informal committee was formed to draft a petition and gather signatures, led by women including Barbara Bodichon, Emily Davies, and Elizabeth Garrett. In 1869, John Stuart Mill published The Subjection of Women in which he attempted to make a case for perfect equality. He described the role of women in marriage and how it needed to be changed, and comments on three major facets of women's lives that he felt were hindering them: society and gender construction, education, and marriage. He argued that the oppression of women was one of the few remaining relics from ancient times, a set of prejudices that severely impeded the progress of humanity. He agreed to present a petition to Parliament, provided it had at least 100 signatures, and the first version was drafted by his step-daughter, Helen Taylor.

The suffragist Millicent Fawcett suggested that the women's right to vote issue was the main reason for the Speaker's Conference in 1917. She was frustrated by the resultant age limit, though recognising that there were one and a half million more women than men in the country at the time (due to the loss of life in the First World War), accepted that this would not have wide, cross-party support; many of those in favour of suffrage at the Speaker's Conference still wanted to maintain a male majority. Recalling Disraeli's quip, she noted that Britain "is governed not by logic, but by Parliament".

The Home Secretary, George Cave (Con) within the governing coalition introduced the bill:

War by all classes of our countrymen has brought us nearer together, has opened men’s eyes, and removed misunderstandings on all sides. It has made it, I think, impossible that ever again, at all events in the lifetime of the present generation, there should be a revival of the old class feeling which was responsible for so much, and, among other things, for the exclusion for a period, of so many of our population from the class of electors. I think I need say no more to justify this extension of the franchise.

As well, another electoral reform had been debated and only partially implemented – the elimination of plural voting. Between 1906 and 1914, the Liberal Party had been intent on passing a bill to prevent electors whose names appeared on the electoral register more than once from voting more than once. However, Parliament shelved the bill when the First World War started.

Section 8(1) of the Representation of the People Act 1918 partially reduced plural voting, providing that "a man shall not vote at a general election ... for more than one constituency for which he is registered by virtue of other qualifications [than a residence qualification] of whatever kind, and a woman shall not vote at a general election ... for more than one constituency for which she is registered by virtue of any other qualification [than a local government qualification]". As a result, no one was allowed to vote more than twice in a general election of the House of Commons.

== Passage of bill through Parliament ==
The bill was introduced in May 1917 with various stages taking place during the rest of the year, then into 1918. The number of attending members in both Houses was much lower than would be expected due to active military service.

The Speakers' Conference of 1917 had recommended a form of proportional representation to be enacted, but this proved a highly contentious topic through differences of the methods between the two Houses. The final votes of the Bill took place on the very last day of the parliamentary session with the Act including a section arranging for a royal commission to consider whether "one hundred members shall be elected to the House of Commons at a general election on the principle of proportional representation for constituencies in Great Britain returning three or more members". The subsequent commission was held two months after the act was passed and was rejected by the House of Commons.

The very final vote on 6 February 1918 in the House of Commons that led to royal assent of the bill was passed with 224 Ayes to 114 Noes.

== Terms of the act ==
The Representation of the People Act 1918 widened suffrage by abolishing practically all property qualifications for men and by enfranchising women over 30 who met minimum property qualifications. The enfranchisement of this latter group was accepted as recognition of the contribution made by women defence workers. However, women were still not politically equal to men (who could vote from the age of 21); full electoral equality was achieved in Ireland in 1922, but did not occur in Britain until the Representation of the People (Equal Franchise) Act 1928 (18 & 19 Geo. 5. c. 12).

The terms of the act were:

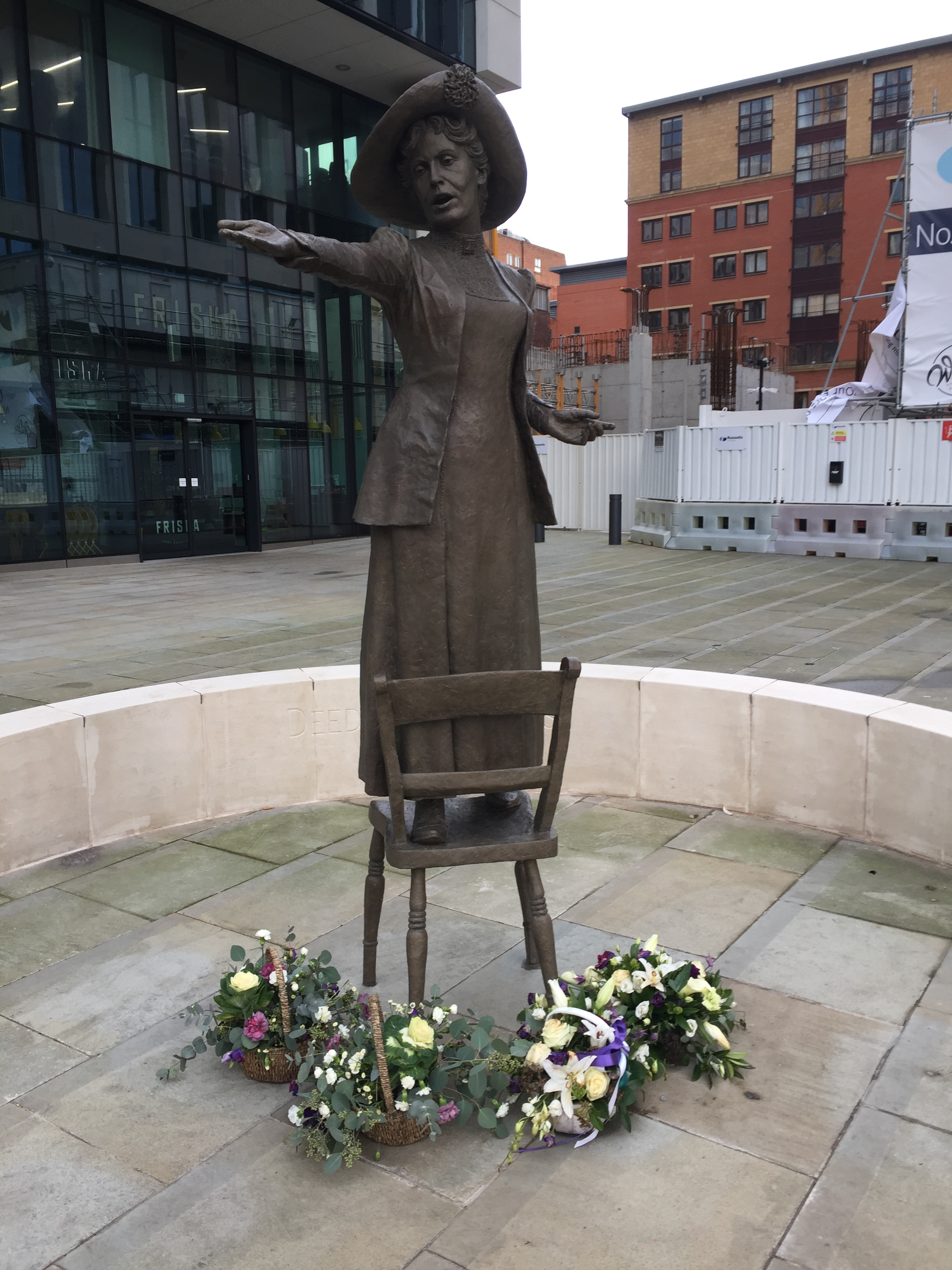
1. Statue of suffragette Emmeline Pankhurst
  All men over 21 gained the vote in the constituency where they were resident. Men who had turned 19 during service in connection with World War I could also vote even if they were under 21, although there was some confusion over whether they could do so after being discharged from service. The Representation of the People Act 1920 clarified this in the affirmative, albeit after the 1918 general election.
2. Women over 30 years old received the vote if they were registered property occupiers (or married to a registered property occupier) of land or premises with a rateable value greater than £5 or of a dwelling-house and not subject to any legal incapacity, or were graduates voting in a university constituency.
3. Some seats were redistributed to industrial towns. Seats in Ireland were amended separately, by the Redistribution of Seats (Ireland) Act 1918.
4. All polls for an election to be held on a specified date, rather than over several days in different constituencies as previously.

The act added 9.2 million women to the electorate as well as 4.5 million men. It was therefore the largest of all the UK Reform Acts in terms of electorate addition.

The costs incurred by returning officers were for the first time to be paid by the Treasury. Prior to the 1918 general election, the administrative costs were passed on to the candidates to pay in addition to their expenses.

=== Short title, commencement and extent ===
Section 47(2) of the act provided that the act may be cited as the "Representation of the People Act, 1918".

Section 46(1) of the act provided that the act would come into force on the passing of the act.

=== Repealed enactments ===
Section 47(1) of the act repealed 109 enactments, listed in the eighth schedule to the act.

Citation	Short title	Description	Extent of Repeal
8 Hen. 6. c. 7	Electors of Knights of the Shires Act 1429	Electors of knights of the shires shall have 40s. a year freehold and be resident.	The whole act so far as unrepealed.
10 Hen. 6. c. 2	Electors of Knights of the Shire Act 1432	The Statute 8 Hen. 6. c. 7 as to freehold qualification of electors of knights of the shires; such freeholds shall be within the county.	The whole act so far as unrepealed.
7 & 8 Will. 3. c. 25	Parliamentary Elections Act 1695	An Act for the further regulating elections of members to serve in Parliament, and for the preventing irregular proceedings of sheriffs and other officers in the electing and returning such members.	Section six.
10 Anne. c. 31 (Note: This is the citation in The Statutes of the Realm.)	Elections (Fraudulent Conveyances) Act 1711	The Elections (Fraudulent Conveyances) Act, 1711.	The whole act so far as unrepealed.
13 Geo. 2. c. 20	Parliamentary Elections (Fraudulent Conveyances) Act 1739	The Parliamentary Elections (Fraudulent Conveyances) Act, 1739.	The whole act so far as unrepealed.
18 Geo. 2. c. 18	Parliamentary Elections Act 1744	The Parliamentary Elections Act, 1744.	The whole act so far as unrepealed.
19 Geo. 2. c. 28	Parliamentary Elections Act 1745	The Parliamentary Elections Act, 1745.	The whole act so far as unrepealed.
3 Geo. 3. c. 15	Freemen (Admission) Act 1763	The Freemen (Admission) Act, 1763.	The whole act so far as unrepealed.
20 Geo. 3. c. 17	Parliamentary Elections Act 1780	The Parliamentary Elections Act, 1780.	The whole act so far as unrepealed.
25 Geo. 3. c. 84	Parliamentary Elections Act 1785	The Parliamentary Elections Act, 1785.	The whole act so far as unrepealed.
33 Geo. 3. c. 64	Parliamentary Elections Act 1793	The Parliamentary Elections Act, 1793.	The whole act.
53 Geo. 3. c. 49	Parliamentary Elections Act 1813	The Parliamentary Elections Act, 1813.	The whole act so far as unrepealed.
4 Geo. 4. c. 36	Joint Tenancy (Ireland) Act 1823	The Joint Tenancy (Ireland) Act, 1823.	The whole act so far as unrepealed.
4 Geo. 4. c. 55	Parliamentary Elections (Ireland) Act 1823	The Parliamentary Elections (Ireland) Act, 1823.	Sections twenty-four, twenty-six, twenty-seven, and twenty-eight.
2 & 3 Will. 4. c. 45	Representation of the People Act 1832	The Representation of the People Act, 1832.	The whole act (except sections sixty-six, seventy, and seventy-six, and the definition of "returning officer" in section seventy-nine); the words "barrister, overseer," in section seventy-six wherever they occur.
2 & 3 Will. 4. c. 65	Representation of the People (Scotland) Act 1832	The Representation of the People (Scotland) Act, 1832.	Sections two to four, six to thirteen; section twenty-seven; section twenty-eight; section thirty-five; section thirty-six, so far as relating to town clerks or deputy town clerks being entitled to vote; section thirty-seven; section forty; section forty-two, and the schedules so far as unrepealed.
2 & 3 Will. 4. c. 88	Representation of the People (Ireland) Act 1832	The Representation of the People (Ireland) Act, 1832.	The whole act so far as unrepealed except sections eleven and twelve.
5 & 6 Will. 4. c. 36	Parliamentary Elections Act 1835	The Parliamentary Elections Act, 1835.	Section seven.
5 & 6 Will. 4. c. 78	Representation of the People (Scotland) Act 1835	The Representation of the People (Scotland) Act, 1835.	Sections three, four, nine, ten, and eleven.
3 & 4 Vict. c. 108	Municipal Corporations (Ireland) Act 1840	The Municipal Corporations (Ireland) Act, 1840.	Sections six and eight to ten.
5 & 6 Vict. c. 74	University of Dublin Registration Act 1842	The University of Dublin Registration Act, 1842.	The whole act so far as unrepealed.
6 & 7 Vict. c. 18	Parliamentary Voters Registration Act 1843	The Parliamentary Voters Registration Act, 1843.	The whole act (except sections eighty-one, eighty-two, eighty-five to ninety, ninety-three, and ninety-seven, and the definition of "returning officer" in section one hundred and one), the word "overseer" in section ninety-seven.
11 & 12 Vict. c. 90	Parliamentary Elections Act 1848	The Parliamentary Elections Act, 1848.	The whole act.
12 & 13 Vict. c. 85	Dublin Corporation Act 1849	The Dublin Corporation Act, 1849.	Sections two, three, five, six, seven, and ten to twelve.
13 & 14 Vict. c. 57	Vestries Act 1850	The Vestries Act, 1850.	Section seven from "to give the notices for claims" to "for revising them, and," and the words "burgess lists and the".
13 & 14 Vict. c. 68	Parliamentary Elections (Ireland) Act 1850	The Parliamentary Elections (Ireland) Act, 1850.	Sections six to nine and section nineteen.
13 & 14 Vict. c. 69	Representation of the People (Ireland) Act 1850	The Representation of the People (Ireland) Act, 1850.	The whole act so far as unrepealed (except sections eighty-eight to ninety-seven and sections one hundred and three, one hundred and eight, and one hundred and eighteen).
14 & 15 Vict. c. 14	Compound Householders Act 1851	The Compound Householders Act, 1851.	The whole act.
14 & 15 Vict. c. 57	Civil Bill Courts (Ireland) Act 1851	The Civil Bill Courts (Ireland) Act, 1851.	Section one hundred and sixty-one.
16 & 17 Vict. c. 28	County Elections (Scotland) Act 1853	The County Elections (Scotland) Act, 1853.	Sections two, three, five, six and seven.
16 & 17 Vict. c. 58	Dublin Parliamentary Revising Act (1853)	The Dublin Parliamentary Revising Act, 1853.	The whole act so far as unrepealed.
16 & 17 Vict. c. 68	Parliamentary Elections Act 1853	The Parliamentary Elections Act, 1853.	In section one the words "for the Universities of Oxford and Cambridge and" the words "to the Vice-Chancellors of the said Universities and" and the words "Vice-Chancellors and"; sections four and five.
17 & 18 Vict. c. 91	Lands Valuation (Scotland) Act 1854	The Lands Valuation (Scotland) Act, 1854.	Section thirty-four.
19 & 20 Vict. c. 58	Burgh Voters Registration (Scotland) Act 1856	The Burgh Voters Registration (Scotland) Act, 1856.	The whole act so far as unrepealed.
20 & 21 Vict. c. 68	Dublin Revising Barristers Act 1857	The Dublin Revising Barristers Act, 1857.	The whole act so far as unrepealed except sections two and five.
24 & 25 Vict. c. 53	University Elections Act 1861	The University Elections Act, 1861.	The whole act so far as unrepealed.
24 & 25 Vict. c. 60	Representation of the People (Ireland) Act 1861	The Representation of the People (Ireland) Act, 1861.	The whole act.
24 & 25 Vict. c. 83	County Voters Registration (Scotland) Act 1861	The County Voters Registration (Scotland) Act, 1861.	The whole act so far as unrepealed.
27 & 28 Vict. c. 22	Registration of County Voters (Ireland) Act 1864	The Registration of County Voters (Ireland) Act, 1864.	The whole act so far as unrepealed.
28 & 29 Vict. c. 36	County Voters Registration Act 1865	The County Voters Registration Act, 1865.	The whole act so far as unrepealed.
29 & 30 Vict. c. 54	Revising Barristers Act 1866	The Revising Barristers Act, 1866.	The whole act so far as unrepealed.
30 & 31 Vict. c. 102	Representation of the People Act 1867	The Representation of the People Act, 1867.	The whole act (except sections one, two, seven, thirty-seven, forty-nine to fifty-two, fifty-seven, fifty-nine, and sixty-one, and Schedule H.); section fifty-nine from "and in construing" to the end of the section.
31 & 32 Vict. c. 48	Representation of the People (Scotland) Act 1868	The Representation of the People (Scotland) Act, 1868.	Sections three to six, sections eight to fourteen, sections sixteen to twenty, sections twenty-two, twenty-four, twenty-six, thirty-seven to forty-two, forty-five, forty-seven to fifty, fifty-three, fifty-five, fifty-six, and in section fifty-nine the definition of "premises," and Schedules A., B., C., D., and I.
31 & 32 Vict. c. 49	Representation of the People (Ireland) Act 1868	The Representation of the People (Ireland) Act, 1868.	Sections three to seven, fourteen, sixteen, seventeen, and twenty-four.
31 & 32 Vict. c. 58	Parliamentary Electors Registration Act 1868	The Parliamentary Electors Registration Act, 1868.	The whole act (except sections one, two, three, and twenty-one).
31 & 32 Vict. c. 65	Universities Elections Act 1868	The Universities Elections Act, 1868.	The whole act.
31 & 32 Vict. c. 112	Registration Amendment (Ireland) Act 1868	The Registration Amendment (Ireland) Act, 1868.	The whole act so far as unrepealed.
32 & 33 Vict. c. 41	Poor Rate Assessment and Collection Act 1869	The Poor Rate Assessment and Collection Act, 1869.	Section seven so far as it relates to franchise and any disqualification which depends on franchise; section ten, and section nineteen so far as it relates to franchise and any disqualification which depends on franchise.
33 & 34 Vict. c. 11	Dublin Collector-General of Rates Act 1870	The Dublin Collector of Rates Act, 1870.	The whole act.
35 & 36 Vict. c. 33	Ballot Act 1872	The Ballot Act, 1872.	Section five; section eight from "all expenses" to "by law payable," and (except as respects Scotland and Ireland) from "where the sheriff" to the end of the section; subsection (5) of section sixteen, subsection (4) of section seventeen, sections eighteen and nineteen, section twenty-five from "or where" to "is proved on such trial to have voted at such election" and from "or so retained" to end of the section; section thirty-three from "and shall continue in force" to the end of the section; rules 3 and 58 in the First Schedule.
36 & 37 Vict. c. 2	Polling Districts (Ireland) Act 1873	The Polling Districts (Ireland) Act, 1873.	The whole act so far as unrepealed.
36 & 37 Vict. c. 30	Registration of Voters (Ireland) Act 1873	The Registration of Voters (Ireland) Act, 1873.	The whole act so far as unrepealed.
36 & 37 Vict. c. 70	Revising Barristers Act 1873	The Revising Barristers Act, 1873.	The whole act so far as unrepealed.
37 & 38 Vict. c. 53	Revising Barristers Act 1874	The Revising Barristers Act, 1874.	The whole act so far as unrepealed.
38 & 39 Vict. c. 77	Supreme Court of Judicature Act 1875	The Supreme Court of Judicature Act, 1875.	In section twenty-three, the words "or the distribution of revising barristers among the circuits," and from "and the senior judge" to "boroughs therein."
38 & 39 Vict. c. 84	Parliamentary Elections (Returning Officers) Act 1875	The Parliamentary Elections (Returning Officers) Act, 1875.	Sections two to five, and section seven, and the Schedules, except so far as those sections and schedules apply to elections other than parliamentary elections.
39 & 40 Vict. c. 61	Divided Parishes and Poor Law Amendment Act 1876	The Divided Parishes and Poor Law Amendment Act, 1876.	Section fourteen.
40 & 41 Vict. c. 57	Supreme Court of Judicature Act (Ireland) 1877	The Supreme Court of Judicature Act (Ireland), 1877.	Subsection (2) of section twenty-three from "including" to the end of the subsection.
41 & 42 Vict. c. 3	House Occupiers Disqualification Removal Act 1878	The House Occupiers Disqualification Removal Act, 1878.	The whole act.
41 & 42 Vict. c. 5	House Occupiers Disqualification Removal (Scotland) Act 1878	The House Occupiers Disqualification Removal (Scotland) Act, 1878.	The whole act.
41 & 42 Vict. c. 26	Parliamentary and Municipal Registration Act 1878	The Parliamentary and Municipal Registration Act, 1878.	The whole act so far as unrepealed, (except sections one, two, eleven, twelve, thirteen and fourteen).
41 & 42 Vict. c. 41	Parliamentary Elections Returning Officers Expenses (Scotland) Act 1878	The Parliamentary Elections Returning Officers' Expenses (Scotland) Act, 1878.	Section three and the Schedule.
41 & 42 Vict. c. 78	Education (Scotland) Act 1878	The Education (Scotland) Act, 1878.	Section twenty-four.
42 & 43 Vict. c. 10	Assessed Rates Act 1879	The Assessed Rates Act, 1879.	The whole act so far as it relates to franchise and any disqualification which depends on franchise.
42 & 43 Vict. c. 71	Registry Courts (Ireland) Amendment Act 1879	The Registry Courts (Ireland) Amendment Act, 1879.	The whole act so far as unrepealed.
43 & 44 Vict. c. 6	House Occupiers in Counties Disqualification Removal (Scotland) Act 1880	The House Occupiers in Counties Disqualification Removal (Scotland) Act, 1880.	The whole act.
44 & 45 Vict. c. 40	Universities Elections Amendment (Scotland) Act 1881	The Universities Elections Amendment (Scotland) Act, 1881.	The whole act.
44 & 45 Vict. c. 68	Supreme Court of Judicature Act 1881	The Supreme Court of Judicature Act, 1881.	Section fourteen as far as respects appeals in registration matters.
45 & 46 Vict. c. 50	Municipal Corporations Act 1882	The Municipal Corporations Act, 1882.	Section nine; in subsection (2) of section eleven the words from "or (b) Being entitled" to "to be made," and the words "In either of those cases"; sections thirty-two and thirty-three; subsection (3) of section forty-two; section forty-four; paragraphs (1) to (7) of section forty-five; sections forty-six to forty-nine; in subsection (2) of section fifty-one the words "or vote in more than one ward"; sections sixty-three, seventy-one, and seventy-six, subsections (1) and (3) of section two hundred and nine, section two hundred and forty-four, Part I. of the Third Schedule, in rule four of Part II. of the Third Schedule, the words "or entered in the separate non-resident list required by this Act to be made," Part IV. of the Third Schedule, rule one of Part II. of the Fifth Schedule so far as respects expenses incurred in relation to the enrolment of burgesses, and Forms C to G in Part II. of the Eighth Schedule.
46 & 47 Vict. c. 51	Corrupt and Illegal Practices Prevention Act 1883	The Corrupt and Illegal Practices Prevention Act, 1883.	Subsection (2) of section thirty-two; paragraph (c) of subsection (1) of section thirty-three; subsection (1) of section thirty-five from "and may charge" to the end of the subsection; subsection (3) of section thirty-nine; section forty-seven; the definitions of "registration officer" in sections sixty-four and sixty-eight; subsection (12) of section sixty-eight; subsection (4) of section sixty-nine from "in the manner" to the end of the subsection; subsection (9) of section sixty-nine; paragraph (7) of Part I. of the First Schedule; paragraph (1) of Part II. of the First Schedule; in the "Form of Return of Election Expenses" in Part I. of the Second Schedule the first paragraph under the heading "Expenditure."
47 & 48 Vict. c. 35	County of Dublin Jurors' and Voters' Revision Act 1884	The County of Dublin Jurors' and Voters' Revision Act, 1884.	Section two, so far as respects the appointment of revising barristers and the registration of voters.
47 & 48 Vict. c. 70	Municipal Elections (Corrupt and Illegal Practices) Act 1884	The Municipal Elections (Corrupt and Illegal Practices) Act, 1884.	Subsection (3) of section thirteen.
48 & 49 Vict. c. 3	Representation of the People Act 1884	The Representation of the People Act, 1884.	The whole act so far as unrepealed.
48 & 49 Vict. c. 9	Municipal Voters Relief Act 1885	The Municipal Voters Relief Act, 1885.	The whole act so far as unrepealed.
48 & 49 Vict. c. 15	Registration Act 1885	The Registration Act, 1885.	The whole act so far as unrepealed (except sections sixteen, nineteen, and twenty); the definitions of "ownership voter," "fifty pounds rental voter," and "occupation voter" in section nineteen.
48 & 49 Vict. c. 16	Registration Amendment (Scotland) Act 1885	The Registration Amendment (Scotland) Act, 1885.	Section three, except so far as it relates to the valuation roll, sections four and five, sections seven to ten, thirteen to fifteen, and section seventeen.
48 & 49 Vict. c. 17	Parliamentary Registration (Ireland) Act 1885	The Parliamentary Registration (Ireland) Act, 1885.	Sections two to six, eight, nine, thirteen, fifteen, seventeen to thirty, and the Second Schedule.
48 & 49 Vict. c. 23	Redistribution of Seats Act 1885	The Redistribution of Seats Act, 1885.	As respects England and Scotland the whole Act so far as unrepealed, and as respects Ireland, subsections (3) and (4) of section eight, sections ten to twelve, subsections (3), (4), and (5) of section thirteen, sections fourteen, fifteen, eighteen, and twenty, and in section twenty-six the words from "with the following" to the end of the section.
48 & 49 Vict. c. 46	Medical Relief Disqualification Removal Act 1885	The Medical Relief Disqualification Removal Act, 1885.	The whole act so far as unrepealed.
48 & 49 Vict. c. 62	Parliamentary Elections (Returning Officers) Act 1885	The Parliamentary Elections (Returning Officers) Act, 1885.	The whole act so far as unrepealed, except so far as it applies to elections other than parliamentary elections.
49 & 50 Vict. c. 42	Revising Barristers Act 1886	The Revising Barristers Act, 1886.	The whole act.
49 & 50 Vict. c. 43	Revising Barristers (Ireland) Act 1886	The Revising Barristers (Ireland) Act, 1886.	The whole act.
49 & 50 Vict. c. 57	Parliamentary Elections (Returning Officers) Act (1875) Amendment Act 1886	The Parliamentary Elections (Returning Officers) Act (1875) Amendment Act, 1886.	The whole act so far as unrepealed, except so far as it applies to elections other than parliamentary elections.
49 & 50 Vict. c. 58	Returning Officers (Scotland) Act 1886	The Returning Officers (Scotland) Act, 1886.	The whole act.
50 & 51 Vict. c. 55	Sheriffs Act 1887	The Sheriffs Act, 1887.	Subsection (2) of section eighteen, so far as respects sheriffs' courts required for the purpose of elections.
51 & 52 Vict. c. 10	County Electors Act 1888	The County Electors Act, 1888.	The whole act so far as unrepealed.
51 & 52 Vict. c. 41	Local Government Act 1888	The Local Government Act, 1888.	Paragraph (b) of subsection (2) of section two from "or is registered" to the end of the paragraph; paragraph (xii) of section three; subsection (6) of section thirty-four; proviso twelve in section seventy-five; sections seventy-six and seventy-seven; in paragraph (6), of section eighty-three the words "registration of parliamentary voters or to the," the words "or to any registration matters," and the word "registration" where it lastly occurs; in subsection (2) of section ninety-two the word "occupation" and the words "of making out and revising the lists of voters, of conducting any parliamentary election"; subsection (3) of section ninety-two.
52 & 53 Vict. c. 50	Local Government (Scotland) Act 1889	The Local Government (Scotland) Act, 1889.	Subsection (4) of section eight, and sections twenty-eight and twenty-nine.
53 & 54 Vict. c. 55	Elections (Scotland) (Corrupt and Illegal Practices) Act 1890	The Elections (Scotland) (Corrupt and Illegal Practices) Act, 1890.	In section one the definition of "revising authority"; subsection (3) of section seventeen; subsections (7) and (8) of section twenty-nine.
53 & 54 Vict. c. 58	Parliamentary Registration Expenses (Ireland) Act 1890	The Parliamentary Registration Expenses (Ireland) Act, 1890.	The whole act so far as unrepealed.
54 & 55 Vict. c. 11	Electoral Disabilities Removal Act 1891	The Electoral Disabilities Removal Act, 1891.	The whole act.
54 & 55 Vict. c. 18	Registration of Electors Act 1891	The Registration of Electors Act, 1891.	The whole act.
54 & 55 Vict. c. 49	Returning Officers (Scotland) Act 1891	The Returning Officers (Scotland) Act, 1891.	Section three and the Schedule.
54 & 55 Vict. c. 68	County Councils (Elections) Act 1891	The County Councils (Elections) Act, 1891.	Section two.
56 & 57 Vict. c. 73	Local Government Act 1894	The Local Government Act, 1894.	Sections forty-three and forty-four.
57 & 58 Vict. c. 58	Local Government (Scotland) Act 1894	The Local Government (Scotland) Act, 1894.	Subsection (1) of section ten from "provided that" to the end of the subsection; sections eleven and twelve.
59 & 60 Vict. c. 17	Glasgow Parliamentary Divisions Act 1896	The Glasgow Parliamentary Divisions Act, 1896.	The whole act.
61 & 62 Vict. c. 2	Registration (Ireland) Act 1898	The Registration (Ireland) Act, 1898.	The whole act.
61 & 62 Vict. c. 37	Local Government (Ireland) Act 1898	The Local Government (Ireland) Act, 1898.	Section ninety-eight except subsection (8); section one hundred and nine from "The expression 'revising barrister'" to "1885."
62 & 63 Vict. c. 14	London Government Act 1899	The London Government Act, 1899.	Subsection (4) of section three; subsection (1) of section four from "and shall be" to "electors"; and subsection (2) of section twenty-seven.
63 & 64 Vict. c. 29	London County Council Electors Qualification Act 1900	The London County Council Electors Qualification Act, 1900.	The whole act.
63 & 64 Vict. c. 49	Town Councils (Scotland) Act 1900	The Town Councils (Scotland) Act, 1900.	Section twenty-three from the words "all persons who would have been entitled" to the end of the section; and sections twenty-four to thirty-two.
3 Edw. 7. c. 34	Town Councils (Scotland) Act 1903	The Town Councils (Scotland) Act, 1903.	Sections two and four.
8 Edw. 7. c. 14	Polling Arrangements (Parliamentary Boroughs) Act 1908	The Polling Arrangements (Parliamentary Boroughs) Act, 1908.	The whole act.
8 Edw. 7. c. 21	Registration Act 1908	The Registration Act, 1908.	The whole act.
8 Edw. 7. c. 35	Polling Districts and Registration of Voters (Ireland) Act 1908	The Polling Districts and Registration of Voters (Ireland) Act, 1908.	The whole act.
8 Edw. 7. c. 48	Post Office Act 1908	The Post Office Act, 1908.	Section eighty.
1 & 2 Geo. 5. c. 53	House Letting and Rating (Scotland) Act 1911	The House Letting and Rating (Scotland) Act, 1911.	Section seven, proviso (3) from the words "Provided that for the purposes of any qualification or franchise" to end of that proviso; and section eight.
4 & 5 Geo. 5. c. 25	Electoral Disabilities (Naval and Military Service) Removal Act 1914	The Electoral Disabilities (Naval and Military Service) Removal Act, 1914.	The whole act.

== Political changes ==
The size of the electorate tripled from the 7.7 million who had been entitled to vote in 1912 to 21.4 million by the end of 1918. Women now accounted for about 39.64% of the electorate. Had women been enfranchised based upon the same requirements as men, they would have been in the majority because of the loss of men in the war.

The age of 30 was chosen because it was all that was politically possible at the time. Any attempt to make it lower would have failed. as Lord Robert Cecil explained shortly after the act was passed:

That is the reason why the age limit of thirty was introduced, in order to avoid extending the franchise to a very large number of women, for fear they might be in a majority in the electorate of this country. It was for that reason only, and it had nothing to do with their qualifications at all. No one would seriously suggest that a woman of twenty-five is less capable of giving a vote than a woman of thirty-five.

In addition to the suffrage changes, the act also instituted the present system of holding all voting in a general election on one day, as opposed to being staggered over a period of weeks (although the polling itself would only take place on a single day in each constituency), and brought in the annual electoral register.

== Aftermath ==
The first election held under the new system was the 1918 general election. Polling took place on 14 December 1918, but vote-counting did not start until 29 December 1918.

After this act gave about 8.4 million women the vote, the Parliament (Qualification of Women) Act 1918 was passed in November 1918, allowing women to be elected to Parliament. Several women stood for election to the House of Commons in 1918, but only one, the Sinn Féin candidate for Dublin St. Patrick's, Constance Markievicz, was elected; however she followed her party's abstentionist policy and did not take her seat at Westminster and instead sat in the Dáil Éireann (the First Dáil) in Dublin. The first woman to take her seat in the House of Commons was Nancy Astor on 1 December 1919, who was elected as a Coalition Conservative MP for Plymouth Sutton on 28 November 1919.

As Members of Parliament, women also gained the right to become government ministers. The first woman cabinet minister and Privy Council member was the Labour Party's Margaret Bondfield, Minister of Labour from 1929 to 1931.

Although the act extended the franchise significantly, it did not create a complete system of one person, one vote. Seven percent of the population enjoyed a plural vote in the 1918 election, mostly well off or middle-class men who had an extra vote due to a university constituency (this act increased the university vote by creating the Combined English Universities seats) or by occupying business premises in a constituency different from where they live. (Note: For men, business premises with a ratable value in excess of £10 gave a right to vote in a constituency. Voting in multiple constituencies was not prohibited until the Representation of the People Act 1948 s. 1(2).)

== See also ==
- Electoral reform in the United Kingdom
- Parliamentary franchise in the United Kingdom 1885–1918
- Reform Acts
- Representation of the People Act
- Suffragette bombing and arson campaign
- Timeline of women's suffrage
- Women in the House of Commons of the United Kingdom
- Women in the House of Lords
- Women's suffrage in the United Kingdom

== Bibliography ==
- "Index of Representation of the People Bill". Parliamentary Debates (Hansard). Dates 1917-06-06 to 1918-11-04 relate to the bill enacted in 1918.
- "Image of original Act". UK Parliament Website.
