= Freemen (Admission) Act 1763 =

Act of the Parliament of Great Britain

Freemen (Admission) Act 1763 (Note: The citation of this act by this short title was authorised by section 1 of, and the first schedule to, the Short Titles Act 1896. Due to the repeal of those provisions it is now authorised by section 19(2) of the Interpretation Act 1978.)
- Act of Parliament
- Parliament of Great Britain
- Long title: An act to prevent occasional freemen from voting at elections of members to serve in parliament for cities and boroughs.
- Citation: 3 Geo. 3. c. 15
- Territorial extent: Great Britain

Dates
- Royal assent: 31 March 1763
- Commencement: 1 May 1763 (Note: Section 1.)
- Repealed: 6 February 1918
Other legislation
Amended by	Statute Law Revision Act 1867; Statute Law Revision Act 1888
Repealed by	Representation of the People Act 1918

Status: Repealed

Text of statute as originally enacted

The Freemen (Admission) Act 1763 (3 Geo. 3. c. 15), sometimes called the Freeman (Admission) Act 1763, was an act of the Parliament of Great Britain. The act withheld the right to vote in parliamentary elections, in those boroughs where honorary freemen could vote, from any freemen admitted to the freedom within twelve months of the first day of the election; it did not affect the rights of ordinary freemen, admitted by the custom of the borough in question. London and Norwich were excluded from the restrictions.

The act was passed in response to a number of instances of large numbers of non-resident honorary freemen being created to sway the results of elections, often after the writ for an election had been issued. At an election for Durham City in 1761, 215 new freemen, mostly non-resident, had been created after the issue of the writ and had proved decisive in a total poll of around 1,500. After the result was overturned on petition a bill was introduced to check this abuse, and the act was consequently known colloquially as the Durham Act.

== Subsequent developments ==
The whole act so far as unrepealed was repealed by section 47(1) of, and the eighth schedule to, the Representation of the People Act 1918 (7 & 8 Geo. 5. c. 64).
